= Antiques Roadshow (series 29) =

British television series

Antiques Roadshow is a British television series produced by the BBC since 1979. Series 29 (2006/07) comprised 31 editions that were broadcast by the BBC from 3 September 2006 – 22 April 2007

The dates in brackets given below are the dates each episode was filmed at the location. The date not in brackets is the episode's first UK airing date on BBC One.

== Series 29 (2006/07) ==
Series 29: 31 editions in 2006/07

Series / Episode Aired	Location & Region	Host & Experts	Notes
3/9/2006	Antiques Roadshow; Greatest Finds	Michael Aspel & Elizabeth Crawford	–
10 September 2006	Antiques Roadshow; Greatest Finds	Michael Aspel &	–
17 September 2006	Antiques Roadshow; Greatest Finds	Michael Aspel &	–
29/1; 24 September 2006	Gloucester Cathedral; Gloucestershire	Michael Aspel & Henry Sandon; Geoffrey Munn; Jon Baddeley; David Battie; Steven Moore; Hilary Kay	– Staffordshire Pottery figurines of Jeremy Ward. £200-£400 – English Majolica cheese pot by George Jones, £5,000 – bronze statue by Kathleen Scott, widow of Robert Falcon Scott of the Antarctic value £2,000 – letter from J. R. R. Tolkien about The Lord of the Rings. value £3,000 – 'castle top' Visiting card case depicting Westminster Abbey, made by Nathaniel Mills of Birmingham, 1855, value £3,000 – original film scripts: - Dr Who (William Hartnel) £300; Not Only... But Also by Peter Cook, Dudley Moore and John Lennon, £500 – collection of Campaign furniture from the 1790s onwards. early 19th century canvas chairs; chest of drawers / bathroom unit / vanity unit / writing desk 1785-1810 £2,000 – collection of watercolour paintings by Charlie Twilton, Worcester Cathedral, Friar Street, River Severn. Sacked from Royal Worcester for indiscipline, worked as paint sprayer at car factory. value £700-£800 each. – Working model/toy gas cooker by Charlie Twilton, – gold decorated powder compact with Cabochon rubies, designed by Boucheron of France, 1940s, value £7,000 – Henry Berry (rugby union) Rugby union caps and memorabilia, including England 1910, Gloucestershire 1910, £2,000 – Box of Chocolates dated 1900 – collection of René Lalique glassware, 1920s Ceylon style lamp £4,000; Avalon style vase, £1,000; Powder Pot with Dandelion design, £1,200 – silver Christening set decorated with vine leaves, made by Aaron Hadfield, 1840, £1,000 – bronze Japanese statue holding gong, Japanese, Meiji period, late 19th century. £1,500 – coins from Sir Cloudesley Shovell's fleet in the Scilly Islands. – Celestial sphere by 'J. & W. Cary', London, Late 18th Century, £400 – Marine chronometer, 1837, £4,000 – 1940s waterproof Panerai watch, as worn by the frogmen of the Decima Flottiglia MAS in World War II, captured from a Nazi diver at the Battle of Arnhem, £20,000 – Japanese vase, Satsuma ware, made in Kyoto, c1885-1900, decorated panels and black lacquer framing and gilding, Kinkozan, £10,000 – catalogue from Witley Court estate sale in 1937, £150 – pair of bronze crested parakeets £250 – railings art £300 – Worcester porcelain made by George Grainger, 1840, an extra (experimental) plate from a set that Queen Victoria gave to Tzar Nicholas I of Russia, £4,000 – ornate Credenza / cabinet, 1860s-1870s, French shape, English decoration by Owen Jones (architect) and Christopher Jess and Wedgewood Jasperware, £7,000 – collection of jewellery - emerald and diamond brooch, 1930s Art Deco, £3,000 – Victorian emerald and diamond earrings, 1845, £5,000 – individually foiled emeralds in 'canateel' gold setting, William IV (1830s), £8,000
29/2; 1/10/2006	Carter's Steam Fair; Priory Park, Haringey	Michael Aspel & Lars Tharp; Nicholas Mitchel; John Axford	– 1920s Art Nouveau vase by Moorcroft, in Maiping shape. £3,000 – Painting of 'Girls scrumping plums' by Arthur Elsley. Marked 'Frontispiece'. £5,000 – collection of Brushes: ceiling brush; fireplace 'blacking brush'; carpet beater; brush for fur coats; ensemble - £400 – two vases / bottles by Burratot of France, 145 copy of Persian style by William De Morgan, £3,000 & £8,000 – Ronnie Barker sketch scripts, written under the alias of Gerald Wiley, including the Four candles sketch. £2,000. (Subsequently, authenticated and sold at auction for £48,500) – Satinwood veneer cabinet
29/3; 8 October 2006	Kedleston Hall; Derbyshire	Michael Aspel & John Axford; Lars Tharp; Paul Atterbury; David Battie; Ian Harris; Nicholas Mitchell; Andrew Davis; John Benjamin	– Art Deco bronze sculpture of woman and Borzoi dog, made by Louis Riché 1920s Paris £5,000 – Noah's Ark toy with 120 animals, made in Nurenburg, 1843, with inscribed messageTo Carolyn Mary Johnston from Grand-mama. £3,000 – bronze 1898 Japanese, bronze sculpture, by shobi, £2,000 – Donald Duck teapot made by 'Wadeheath' company of George Wade (pottery manufacturer) £500 – 'turret clock' possibly the 'lost original' from Kedleston Hall. Designed by 'Whitehurst of Derby' in 1761, £3,000 – 'Mill clock' incorporating longcase clock mechanism and second dial powered by the 'Mill Wheel'. Used as a productivity aid. – bronze figure by Franz Xavier Bergman of Vienna, signed Namgreb, dated 1900 £1,200 – bronze figure of female dancer by Gustav Schmidt-Cassel, 1920s. £6,000 – prize Devonport desk latterly better known as Davenport desk, made in Spanish mahogany by 'F Sherwin' in 1894. Won first prize in't Co-op competition. £1,800 – Mintons Ltd pottery 1890s copy of design style by 'Bernard Parisi' from the 1560s. Lazy Susan oyster server, £5,000. Oyster plates (chipped) £400 – English necklace in 'Cambridge blue' enamel and gold with half pearls 1865 £2,000 – 1880s pendant with scrolling Byzantine or Coptic motifs by John Brogden (jeweller), (maker of revivalist jewellery in Roman and Byzantine styles) £3,500 – painting of Pekingese dogs and Mount Fuji, by A.C. Duggan, £2,500 – collection of electric toasters, 1909–1960, up to £3,000 – Smoking pipe (tobacco), carved in Meerschaum style in Germany, carved with head on the bowl in Vienna c.1860, £1,000 – ornate 1900 porcelain bog and wash basin by 'Cauldon Potteries' of Staffordshire. The Neptune toilet bowl. £5,000 – musical automaton of Girl playing with cat. Probably used by street vendor, probably Bulgarian or Hungarian manufacture, £500 – pair of 1870s bone china Spode vases made by W. T. Copeland (William Copeland) of Stoke-on-Trent, painted by Charles Ferdinand Hürten. £6,000
29/4; 15 October 2006	Auckland Castle; Bishop Auckland	Michael Aspel & Jon Baddeley; Christopher Payne; Hilary Kay; Lars Tharp; Eric Knowles	– collection of cats figurines, - pair of Staffordshire made in the 1900s, £400, – miniature cat 'love token' made in 1750 by the Chelsea porcelain factory £1,000 – 1926 'wind-up' toy car, made in Great Britain by Chad Valley or Metoy or .... £500 – oil painting by 'Miss Hoadley', 1920s – gold and black decorated 'widow's mourning locket', (black ivy symbolising the end of a marriage), £700, plus gold chain £500 – carved wooden statue of American Indian, 1990s shop sign for tobacconists, – 1970s Studio glass blue bowl, by Charlie Meaker, (American working in Sunderland, UK) £200 – Caterpillar Club gold brooch and membership card. Awarded since 1922 by the Irving Air Chute company for over 20,000 crew who bailed out of planes, £250 – carved wooden wall-mounted pot stand decorated with gilt gesso. English 1725 Rococo (first period) £7,500 – late 19th century, Norwegian pine bench, carved in Viking [Old Norsk] revival style, £1,000 – 1870 English Gothic table £1,250 – silver case made by Liberty (department store) in 1903, decorated by Archibald Knox (designer) in the Celtic Revival style of Art Nouveau £400 – bronze sculpture by Charles d'Orville Pilkington Jackson (known as Pilkington Jackson 1887–1973) in 1928. Cast from a 'studio model' for a tableau in wood at the David Livingstone memorial, (Blantyre, South Lanarkshire) £3,000 – collection of chamber pots, – ceramic statue of woman and baby by Charles Vyse, 1931, for the Chelsea porcelain factory, £1,500 – photo of victorious 'blind sheepdog' and shepherd, mohair christening gown from the 1870s, £200 – World War II memorabilia, pilot's log, photos, dog tags, plus skeleton keys used to escape from handcuffs on the Lamsdorf Death March, £600 – Devonish Harvest Jug, 1767, Slipware carved through stained clay layers by Morgan Binahan of Barnstaple, £9,000
29/5; 22 October 2006	Auckland Castle; Bishop Auckland	Michael Aspel & Steven Moore; Jon Baddeley; Christopher Payne; Hilary Kay; Lars Tharp; Eric Knowles	– oil painting Early 19th century fake of William Shakespeare £1,200 – glass bowler hat made in Sunderland in the 1860s, (Frigger whimsey glass). £100 – brown earthenware flask styled as a 'Railway chronometer', made at the 'Canny Hill Pottery'£250 – two Royal Worcester dessert plates, 1820s, painted by 'Doctor' George Davis/ marked Flight Barr and Barr. £1,000 – 1935 Rolls-Royce, via Rhodesia, Germany, William Wrigley in Santa Catalina Island, California, to Auckland Castle. – collection of optician's false eyes from the 1920s. £30,000 – gold helmet containing compass and 'gambling gamed. Gift from Edward, Prince of Wales (later Edward VII) £1,000 – 1760 'mourning ring' decorated with human hair on ivory £800 – painting of Romilly John by her father Augustus John £20,000
29/6; 29 October 2006	Swansea Guildhall; Swansea	Michael Aspel & John Sandon; Richard Price; Hilary Kay; Lars Tharp; John Benjamin	– Swansea Guildhall decorated with Frank Brangwyn panels – Merry Musicians porcelain figures, from Royal Doulton of Lambeth, sculpted by George Tinworth (GT), £5,000 – Butterfly brooch, made of opals, emeralds and diamonds, 1895, £3,000 – Swallow brooch, made of gold and diamond, 'late Victorian sentimentality', 1895 £400 – diamond ring, 2.5 carats, set in rubies, £4,000 – enamelled Staffordshire pearlware die (plural "dice") / ball. 52 sides, numbered up to 260 in 5s. 1820s £260 – 1850, Cantonese Pagoda ornament in bone and ivory, made for East India Company tourists, £2,500 – Victorian pedestal sideboard, £1,000 – George III 'mock pendulum' striking English Bracket clock made by Thomas Hill (clockmaker) of Fleet Street London, 1770s, £8,000 or £11,000 – painted 'tin glazed' Delftware figurine with Bonnetiere for holding Holy water, 1770s. £800 – Battered World War I cornet, presented to the Welsh Guards by the Prince of Wales, – collection of family memorabilia, photographs and diary, from Great Uncle Bachlan, lost in India in the 1920s, – Marc Bolan's Gibson Flying V guitar, £50,000 – Marc Bolan's costumes / stage threads, £8-12,000 each – gold vanity case decorated with enamel scene. Gift to chauffeur from Charles Baillie-Hamilton (Conservative politician). Hallmark - 'imported to London by 'Freeman and co' (Freeman Bennett?), 1930s £800 – needlework sampler, first Welsh settlers to Patagonia aboard HMS Vandyke (HMS Vandyk?), c1884, £150 – Frank Brangwyn panels jigsaw puzzles – anti-suffragette doll, £300 – collection of anti-suffragette postcards, c1908, £20 each – English silver candlestick, 1640–1680, £2,000 – self-portrait by Sidney Frank Mouchon, 1800s? £5,000 – portrait of his wife by Sidney Frank Mouchon, 18th century, reflecting the styles of Joshua Reynolds and Thomas Gainsborough £35,000
29/7; 5 November 2006	Hughenden Manor; High Wycombe	Michael Aspel & John Benjamin; David Battie; Hilary Kay; Lars Tharp; Eric Knowles	
29/8; 12 November 2006	Hughenden Manor; High Wycombe	Michael Aspel & Christopher Payne; Hilary Kay; Lars Tharp	– Benjamin Disraeli's drawing room used for drawing 'top secret' maps during World War II. Map showing Hitler's secret hideaway – Royal Worcester coffee set, 1930s, £4,000 – Royal Worcester 'dealers proofs' artwork by Harry Davis in the style of Correau, £3,000 – Fairground Roundabout (Carousel) relics, carved wooden Generals by 'Spooner of Burton on Trent' : Herbert Kitchener, 1st Earl Kitchener, Redvers Buller and Frederick Roberts, 1st Earl Roberts, £12,000 – carved wooden Carousel Centaur by 'Andersons'. - Captain Edward Smith (sea captain) of the RMS Titanic £20,000 – electro-plate ear trumpet, late 19th century, £500 – 1870s white statue moulded in Parian Ware (named after Isle of Paros), sculpted by William Calder Marshall R.A. £500 – Gold snuff box, c 1810, possibly Austrian or Italian, £4,000 – Gold jewellery, with Pyrope (Blood red) Garnet, mid Victorian era, £800. Garnet brooch £600, Brooch with 2 carat, Victorian cut, diamond, £2,000 – Carved wood 'wine cooler' - lead-lined chest, shaped like a sarcophagus, 1740s, £10,000 – hand-coloured litho print of scene by Myles Birket Foster. 1910, £200 – 1936 Austin 12 van loaded with chairs from the local Ercol factory. 1850s Windsor chairs £700 each; Sofa from second class salon on RMS Queen Mary £800; Ercol 'double cane' comfy chair from 'The Russian Cane Works' £500 – Margarete Steiff GmbH 'muzzled teddybear' 1907, £2,000 – 1850s 'Salt glazed' stoneware 'Chemist's Jar', from either 'Bramptons' of Derbyshire or a factory in Nottinghamshire, £800 – bronze ornament of The Treasure Seeker by T. Curtz (1895–1929) of Vienna. Includes secret bronze of 'naked lady'. £1,200 – 1726 English silver 'sauce boat' by William Darker. £1,600 – landscape of Connemara by painter Paul Henry of Belfast, 1930s, (Henry studied in Paris with Whistler) £60,000 –
29/9; 19 November 2006	Unseen items from Swansea Guildhall & Kedleston Hall; Derbyshire	Michael Aspel &	Kedleston Hall – repaired earthenware pottery jug, 'joggled' with coloured slips of clay, giving a tortoiseshell effect, 1750s, £1,000 – trophy display cabinet from local Grammar school, in carved rosewood with Fleur-de-lis emblem, 1825–30, £2,500 – ... sitting on a 1798 oak chest of drawers, £1,200 – 19th century oil painting redolent of the style of David Teniers the Younger, 19th century frame and canvas, by unreadable signature, £3,500 – King Kong memorabilia, including a 1930s foyer life-size model of Mr Kong, from the Electric Palace Cinema in Bridport, Dorset. £500 – memorabilia of Lieutenant Edward Arthur Maund, African explorer. He competed against and later worked with Cecil Rhodes for mining concessions in Matabeleland and Mashonaland. £2,000 – Teddybear by J. K. Farnell, c.1910, £5,000 – collection of avant garde Tigo items made by Denby Pottery Company. Sculpted by Tibor Reich (born in Budapest, 1920s, textile designer, worked for Royal Shakespeare Theatre, 10 Downing Street and Concorde.) Plates £500 Swansea – Model of Cutty Sark, made in the 1950s by sailor on 10-month voyage. £500 – collection of commemorative ceramics, including 'British Cartoon Art' Jug about Napoleon. Inscribed, Bonaparte dethroned April 1914. Made at Lewis Weston Dillwyn's Nantgarw Pottery, Swansea, in canary yellow glaze, £500 – painting of foyer of Swansea Townhall, by H.R. Thompson, commissioned by the architect. £6,000 – 'Grande sonnerie', quarter striking Swiss pocket watch. Marked Repetition, No 6873, Grande Sonnerie, Konnant en Passant & à volonld. Bulletin de Observation De Neuchâtel. Presented to Captain Samuel Blackmoor, who sailed the RMS Rosefield between Swansea and South America c.1900s. In 1906 he rescued the Mexican mail ship Moralos, and was presented with the watch by grateful passengers. Inscribed To the captain of the Rosefield... £8,000 – collection of autographs, photographs, £400-£600 each. Embroidered coverlet of signatures, £800. – 3rd century carved stone Buddha and Winged Atlas from Gandhara Kingdom. Nicked/stolen/looted/purloined/relocated from an Asian temple using a hammer and chisel, and renicked/restolen/relooted/repurloined/rerelocated from the British Museum in 1914. – tooled red leather jewellery box with 'Harvey & Gore' Corsage (bodice) brooch. 1740s. Golden brown topaz, foiled, solid silver. £3,000 – tooled red leather box, with diamond double headed flower brooch. Brazilian or Indian 12 carat 'river diamonds'. £15,000 – tooled red leather box, with 1920s natural pearl necklace, £3,000
29/10; 26 November 2006	Music Hall; Aberdeen	Michael Aspel & Ian Harris; Richard Price; Christopher Payne; Paul Atterbury	– 1920s Wedgewood jars decorated by Daisy Makeig-Jones with fairy 'Thurbolds', £3,500 – Snow White and Seven Dwarfs book signed by Walt Disney £800 – Scottish Highlands 'basket hilted' Broadsword. Mid 18th century, £2,000 – collection of Ocean liner memorabilia (postcards, menus, cutlery, cooking pots and 'White Star silver vegetable dish'), RMS Queen Mary, RMS Mauretania, RMS Lusitania, and White Star Line RMS Olympic, £10,000 – Evening handbags, and 1855 corkscrew by William Lund, £150 – sand cast studio glass objet d'art by Sarah Peterson. £200 – Flemish oak cabinet, 1620–1650, modified by Scottish family c.1830. £6,000 – Carriage clock with 'arcaded body' and repeater mechanism, made by 'Maurice & Co' in France. 1900s. £4,000 – collection of church enamelled silverware, made in Aberdeen, ranging from the 1750s to the 19th century. Silver chalice £10,000. – Swedish glass bowl by 'Kosta Boda' 1935 £800 – vinyl record (disc) announcing the end of World War II, distributed to cinemas. – collection of scrimshaw on walrus tusks, depicting Inuit, prey (walrus and seal) and polar bears. £1,800 – plate Russian revolutionary porcelain, 1920, images of decay of Tsar's court, marks of both Tsar and Hammer and Sickle, Value several thousand pounds. – diamond butterfly brooch, late Victorian, by Hancocks Jewellers, £10,000 – Margarete Steiff GmbH (Steiff) Teddybear with 'centre-seam'. £3,000 – silver mug, c.1700, with coat of arms for a woman (includes a lozenge), made by Robert Cooper of London during reign of Charles II, (Cooper also made a 'spitting pot' for Samuel Pepys) £5,000 – pair of cold painted bronze hunters by Franz Xavier Bergman of Vienna, signed Namgreb with Geschutz mark. c.1900 £10,000 (plus unseen 'man in a tent' which was left at home. £5,000)
29/11; 3 December 2006	Prideaux Place; Padstow; Cornwall	Michael Aspel & Richard Price; David Battie; Hilary Kay; Eric Knowles	– Ming Dynasty jar, c.1600, Kraak porcelain. Value £3,000 – 'Bizarre pattern' Quilt of Queen Victoria's fabrics, and Queen Mary's wedding dress. £500 – Celluloid painting of Peter Pan, signed by Walt Disney, £3,000 – 19th century ornate Moorish Spanish Bargueño/Vargueño cabinet in Rosewood £3,000 – bronze dog statue by George Fox, 1903, value £1,500 – Japanese flag, sword and memorabilia, surrendered at the Battle of Kohima, (Nagaland), in 1944, £15,000 – Porcelain clock/watch stand, by William Comyns (craftsman), £350 – Collection of Arnold Taylor (artist) (of Holmfirth) watercolours, drawings and seaside postcards, £600-800 each – 1910 bone china souvenir teapot, £40 – 1740 Oil painting of Humphrey Prideaux-Brune, 7th owner of Prideaux Place, by his unrequitted lover, Rosalba Carriera – 1890 cabinet from Liverpool with handles by Richard LLewellyn Benson Rathbone, £1,500, – Della Robbia Pottery by Harry Pierce (potter) (£250-£500) style – Western Morning News clipping, and 19th century catalogues - 1846. Memorabilia of Wreck auction. – 1950s Bust in Cornish granite by Jim Clack (Estcourt James Clack, was a full-time woodwork teacher at Blundell's School in Halberton, Devon), £1200 – Letter written by Lord Nelson on HMS Victory in the Mediterranean, £10,000 – Music memorabilia, incl manuscript written by Ivor Novello for Elsa Macfarland,
29/12; 10 December 2006	Prideaux Place; Padstow; Cornwall	Michael Aspel & Richard Price; David Battie; Hilary Kay; Eric Knowles; Steven Moore; Penny Brittain; Geoffrey Munn; Phillip Mould; Dendy Easton	– Gourd grown as portable 'cricket cage' for Chinese mandarins to hear "music", 1736–1795, £1,000 – Black wooden doll, c.1790, multi-layered clothing, £1,500 – Pig shaped ornamental bell, London 1902 by William Hornby, value £1,500 – 1960s Kutchinsky bracelet (similar to that worn by Princess Margaret) value £8,000, – Kutchinsky brooch £2,000 – 19th century copy of 17th century oil painting of cattle by Aelbert Cuyp £1,000 – 1690 English Delftware blue plate, white tin-glazed on the front only. Made at the Bristol factory at Brislington, value £8,000 – Staffordshire pottery Watch holder and dummy clock, 1820 Obadiah Sherratt, £6,000 – 1920s kitchen cupboard Old Mother Hubbard - deluxe £600 – miniature lantern clock by Thomas Bradford of London c.1700, value £8,000 – collection of 1890s-1970s Newlyn Industrial School boxes and inkwells, £80-£150-£300 – collection of Louis Wain drawings of cats, £2,000-£3,000 each – 1580s cast iron Saker (cannon) commissioned by Henry VIII, £35,000 – 19th century diamond bee brooch ("be sure of my love") by 'Rouvenat & Ch Lourdel' of Paris, £9,000 – 1780s pastel portrait by Sir Thomas Lawrence. £13,000
29/13; 17 December 2006	Baron's hall Arundel Castle; Arundel; Sussex	Michael Aspel & Richard Price; David Battie; Hilary Kay; Eric Knowles	– Roman marble bust, 1st century AD, £5,000 – collection of ornaments in cabinet, – Watercolour given by King ..., – Royal Doulton statue by William K Harper, £500, – Royal Doulton mug by Hannah Barlow £300 – Royal Doulton mice by George Tinworth, 1880s, £5,000 – warming cupboard, – 17th century stoneware wine jar, Tigerware from Cologne Germany, Bellarmine style associated with cardinal Robert Bellarmine, – collection 1920s soft toys - £400 to £1,000 each – miniature doll's dinner service, c.1800, £2000 – collection of ten signed first editions of Ian Fleming books, 1950s. £60,000 – wooden veneered table, English, c.1840s, £3,800 – Japanese rat sculpture, 1900s, symbol of good luck. £3000 – cameo of Jane Grey (died 1792) by James Tassie, £2500 – Early 16th century mayoral seal, cup and maces of Arundel (swallow/hirondelle) - £300,000 – 1935 Italian statue by Sandro Piacetti from either the Lemschi or Asevi factories in Turin. £5,000 – 1900s silver topped Art Nouveau walking stick by René Lalique, £4,000
31 December 2006	Next Generation, Edinburgh	Michael Aspel &	
29/14; 7 January 2007	Gloucester Cathedral; Gloucester	Michael Aspel & Clive Stewart-Lockhart; Henry Sandon; Geoffrey Munn; Penny Brittain; Elaine Binning; Jon Bly; John Axford; Clive Farahar; Jon Baddeley; Andy McConnell; Bill Harriman; David Battie; Paul Viney; Paul Atterbury; Hilary Kay	– 1834 Naïve art painting of 2 children from 'Sandpits Court' Tirley by Mr Fisher of Gloucester - value £5,000 – Staffordshire pottery collection by Tunstall residents, £30 each, – platinum brooch, 1900s, German Jūgendstils style of Art Nouveau £10,000 – Needlework stitcher, 1870s, with poem by Isaac Watts and mirror writing, £1,800 – 'hand stamp' seal for 'Sealing wax', 1840s, Gold and Lapis Lazuli, £600 – Church 'Vestment chest' from the 15th century, – Antiques Roadshow memorabilia – Walking stick handle, German porcelain with Rococo design, 1760s, £500 – Handwritten letters to George Way, the head gamekeeper at Sandringham, including by Elizabeth II; Princess Margaret; Queen Elizabeth The Queen Mother; Albert (George VI); and Queen Mary; £2,000 – Microphone used by Sir Winston Churchill at the House of Commons during World War II. – German Musical box, Symphonium, from Leipzig, £3,000 – Blue glass decanter and bowl, decorated in gold by John Giles (artist) (James Giles) c1765. Mostly worked on porcelain. Gold leaf floated onto an'egg yolk' image before firing and finishing. Display item from Gloucester Museum, value £15,000 – 1820s Rampart gun, also known as a 'Wall piece', for snipers defending cities, £4,000 – The Sluggard bronze statue of Giuseppe Valona (possibly Giuseppe Vasani), by Lord Frederick Leighton, late 19th century, £20,000 – ATS kitbag from the 1940s and Glenn Miller memorabilia, including autographed sheet-music valued at £2,000
29/15; 14 January 2007	Australia Special; Sydney; Melbourne; Australia	Michael Aspel & Eric Knowles; Hilary Kay; Paul Atterbury	– illuminated René Lalique sculpture, $12,000 / £5,000 – William Morris tapestry, $6,500 / £3,000 – 1850s Sewing box, inlaid with Mother of pearl and Rosewood, $7,000 / £3,000 – hand coloured blockprint of Cineraria flowers by Margaret Preston c.1928, $20,000 / £8,000 – Cast iron and coloured glass electric lamp, trompe-l'œil moving image of a forest fire, $1,500 / £600 – painted sheet metal / tin corner cupboard $3,000 / £1,300 – Drawing of the Queen of Sheba, by Sir Edward John Poynter, part of draft for oil painting, $7,000 / £3,000 – 'Squatter's Toolbox' with tools from the 1880s, $6,000 / £2,000 – 1964 The Beatles memorabilia from the Southern Cross Hotel' Melbourne $1,500 – Plate decorated with flowers by E. Chatfield, 1870s, stamped and sold by Howell James & Co., $700 / £300 – Oil portrait of Captain John Wills, ship owner (probably a Slave trader involved in the Triangular trade) in the 1770s. Reportedly a Sons of Liberty who participated in the Boston Tea Party dressed as an Indian chief (but Google finds no trace of him). $150,000 / £50,000 – circular table, 1840s, Australian red cedar extendable, $30,000 / £12,000 – 1940s autograph book, $10,000 / £4,000 – three-faced doll 'Red Riding Hood and the Wolf' (with rotary head) 1900s, $6,000 / £2,000 – Crown Derby porcelain tea service and tray, 1810, decorated by Thomas Steel, $40,000 / £20,000 – photos, letters and wrist watch, gift from Queen Elizabeth The Queen Mother to 'Nanny B' engraved From Elizabeth and Albert, Watch $3,000 / £1,500. Letters $12,000 / £5,000 – Art Nouveau French Mirror / console / table. 1900s. $14,000 / £6,000
29/16; 28 January 2007	Symphony Hall; Birmingham	Michael Aspel & Charlie Ross; Eric Knowles; Geoffrey Munn	– Sweet Charity necklace decorated with moonstones by Arthur & Georgie Gaskin ('Mr & Mrs Arthur Gaskin') of the Arts and Crafts Movement, £3,000 – Victorian / 1900s 'Sparcase cabinet', containing a collection of Fluorspar, crystals and minerals, from either Weardale or West Cumbria. – embroidery by World War I soldiers recovering in the '1st Southern General Hospital (Birmingham) 1914-1918', located in the Great hall of University of Birmingham, given by the soldiers to the Matron Auntie Kathleen, now donated to Birmingham University, £600 – skull design of ivory Walking stick handle, London 1881, £1,000 – pottery collection including copy of Royal Worcester cream jug, made in Lowestoft Porcelain in 1762, £1,000; 1780 Wedgwood Roman Head £150; – 1920s stoneware jar by Ruskin Pottery from Smethwick. £1,500 – Broadwood and Sons piano, 1815, £1500 – picture of girl by Walter Duncan (artist) (son of Edward Duncan) 1900s, £3,000 – radio badges collection, including 1927 Radio Club – inlaid box, 'Travelling dressing case' by Asprey, inlaid in Ebony, rosewood, Tortoiseshell material and ivory, £6,000 – cricket memorabilia, including 1903 autograph book collected by a little girl at Lord's Cricket Ground, £6,000 – Chinese ring puzzle, bone and ivory, 1850s, £250 – collection of paintings including 1830 nightscape of Canadian / North American Indians £3,000 – cameo brooch of the Roman Goddess Flora (mythology), 19th century neo-classical hardstone by Fortunato Pio Castellani, the Revivalist Italian Jeweller, £5,000 – autographed photographs of 1950/60s Hollywood stars - Frank Sinatra £1,000, Abbott and Costello - £1,200
29/17; 4 February 2007	Holkham Hall; Norfolk	Michael Aspel & Eric Knowles; Lars Tharp; Hilary Kay; John Benjamin	– invention of bowler hat by Edward Coke, the younger brother of the 2nd Earl of Leicester – lady Lady Anne/Carey Elizabeth/Sarah, daughter of Thomas Coke, 5th Earl of Leicester showing statues of Elizabeth II and Prince Philip, made by her mother Lady Elizabeth Mary Coke, at Holkham Hall pottery. – pair of 1790s French / Belgian statues, in Beyance, £3,500 – pair of brass boxes commemorating 'Frederick William III of Prussia, containing sealing wax and gaming tool with spinning numbers, 1830s reproduction, £400 – two oil paintings of Victorian couple in 1861 by Solomon Cole (active 1814-1870s, Painter and draughtsman of Worcester and London). Couple wearing black in mourning for Prince Albert, plus favourite greyhound who won the Waterloo Cup for Hare coursing. £5,000 for pair – Collection of family memorabilia from ancestor at the Charge of the Light Brigade, Crimea Medal (Alma, Balaclava and Sebastopol), Distinguished Conduct Medal, Turkish Crimea Medal, Photographs, Round shot / canister shrapnel mounted on ribbon, belt worn in 'the charge'. £6,000 – 1780s cabinet unit with mirror and drawers by Ince and Mayhew, with George Hepplewhite serpentine design, containing George V Art Deco vanity set imported for the Goldsmith & Silversmith Co., £3,000. £7,500 total. – 1921 bronze figure by Ida C. Thoresein (born Gothenburg 1863) of the wife of British Military Attaché in Stockholm. Foundry marks of Otto Meyers, £1,500 – collection of Wedgewood glass from the King's Lynn Glassworks, some by Ronald Stennett-Wilson, (King's Lynn Glass was founded in 1967 by glass designer Ronald Stennett-Willson. Two years later the company became part of the Wedgwood Group,) 'Sheringham' candlesticks, £50-£100, bowl £60, vase £40, – decorated 'Art glass' bottle, French Art Nouveau, 1880s, signed by Émile Gallé, £3,500 – big German Bisque doll, porcelain face, mohair hair, French paperweight-glass eyes, made by 'Simon and Halbig', (S&H, 1869–1920), £2,000 – collection of miscellanea chronicling the life of May Savage, (1911) - designer of headscarves; Sanderson Wallpaper; draughtswoman on 1942 de Havilland Mosquito (de Havilland 60). Collection includes diaries stored in Cadbury Marvel Dried Skimmed Milk containers, accounts books, boxes of stuff, used envelopes, dog food packets, bus tickets including dog's bus tickets, Morse code key, Photographs of pegged oak beam house in Ware, Hertfordshire that was dismantled and rebuilt in Wells-next-the-Sea, – black glass bottle with seal by John Oakes of Bury St Edmunds, 1777, £1,000 – onion bottle with seal on front, 1720, £2,000 – model racing car with working engine, made 1950s, £1,000 – painting by Georges Maigrêt, c.1900, collecting mussels in Brittany with horse and cart on beach, painted with 'mall stick', £6,000 – large flintlock ducksfoot pistol with four barrels, made in Belgium, £8,000
29/18; 17 February 2007	Holkham Hall; Norfolk	Michael Aspel & Eric Knowles; Keith Baker; Paul Atterbury; Hilary Kay	– Holkham Hall, the Alabaster hall – House built in 1734 by Thomas Coke, 1st Earl of Leicester (fifth creation) after 6-year Grand Tour – Holkham library described as 'the most beautiful room in England'. – collection of 'Biscuit Porcelain' "Nodding Mandarins", some with poking tongues, Chinese, German and Japanese – automaton of 'singing bird in a cage', made in Switzerland ' in the 1890s by Blaise Bontems from Paris. £1,500 – self-portrait by Thomas Hewson (£3,000) and collection of his landscapes around North Wales, (Bala, Gwynedd) £300 each – 12 Silver-gilt dog-nosed spoons given to Lady Oxford by Queen Anne made by John Leiderman, (Leaderman) – 7-pound muzzle-loading cannon on wheels, used in India c. 1870s, £20,000 – cast iron American money-bank (money box) - coin-operated 'Boy with kicking mule', made by 'J & E Stevens' of Cromwell, Connecticut, Patent applied for 27 April 1897, £500 – c. 1800 Bureau from Northern UK (Lancashire or Scotland), pine-lined drawers, with ivory handles, £3,000 – collection of Japanese woodblock prints, £300 each, £10,000 for collection – 4 albums / catalogues of 'hashamonty' samples, cloth and lace swatches and tassles, Late 19th century French, £1,000 – platinised silver 'clover leaf' diamond brooch with green garnets from the Urals. Made c1900, £10,000 – Papier-mâché automaton of monkey playing a harp, made by Alexandre Nicholas Tarroude c.1860, needs £1,000 restoration for £5,000 value. – Chief Fire Officer's helmet, 1900s, £700 – pair of Buffalo Bill Cody's gloves, decorated with beadwork by Sioux or Pawnee, c.1887 £10,000
29/19; 24 February 2007	Southport; Lancashire	Michael Aspel & Eric Knowles; Paul Atterbury; David Battie	
29/20; 25 February 2007	Southport; Lancashire	Michael Aspel & Eric Knowles; Richard Price; Ian Pickford; Bunny Campione; David Battie; Paul Atterbury	– 1919 perfume bottle with 'Egyptian lady' stopper. Made in France by Julian Pillard for the Blue Lagoon scent of the perfumer Nicolas de Barry £2,500 – sundial by Benjamin Cole (instrument maker) of 'The Orrery', Fleet street, London, 1770s, £1200 – Islamic style sideboard, 'Anglo Mooresque' pseudo style from Manchester 1880, £3,000 – haystack made in the 1940s for Harvest Festival. £200 – Rocking horse, (Scouse junk) late 19th century, £200 – garnet ring made in Chester, 1918 £60 – opal and gold Art Nouveau pendant by Merle Bennett and Co, £700 – collection of Japanese carved ivory toys, models and tableaux, £10,000. Man on bench £500; boy with bucket and snake £500; Shibayama silver plate inlaid with ivory and mother of pearl, depicting the Seven Gods of Good Fortune, £1,500 – decorated teapot by 'Enoch Wood and Sons' of Staffordshire, depicting American victory in 1814. Made in 1840, £300 – paintings by James Lawrence Isherwood: - landscape £700; seascape £1,500; and TVscape of Ena Sharples at the Rovers Return. £1,500 – two carriage clocks. Early 20C made in Paris £60. Corniche case, two hammer repeater, £1,400 – Cedar wood Cassone (Dowry chest or Hope chest), carved with troubadors and lovemaking in a pastoral scene, late 16th century, £3,000 – silver jug by Emick Romer, a Norwegian working in London, 1768, £1,200 – telephone box, 1890s, silence cabinet, 1950s mechanism, £1,000 – WWII memorabilia, painting of tanks at Battle of Villers-Bocage, medals of Lieutenant Leslie 'Bill' Cotton, £5,000 – painted Chinese dish, late 19th century. The four 'Maidens Immortal' on a raft bringing the Peaches of Immortality to heaven. £1,000 – photographs / autographs of musicians, Mrs Mills to Jimi Hendrix, £30,000
29/21; 18 March 2007	Wakehurst Place; Ardingly; West Sussex	Michael Aspel & Rupert Maas; Geoffrey Munn	– Polyphon 1890s Musical box with rotating christmas tree holder, £600 – Russian icon from 1900s using ancient Byzantine image of Jesus Christ in heaven, designed to drive the Devil out of houses, Made by Ivan Khlebnikov, an iconographer patronised by Tsar Nicholas II of Russia and Tsarina Alexandra Feodorovna (Alix of Hesse), £8,000 – monkey holding Lotus flower Candle snuffer, made in Parian Ware glazed to look like ivory, 1887 £400 – damp tester – collection of photographs and Christmas cards from 'Charles and Diana, Princess of Wales', and much more valuable Diana alone. Sent to the chauffeur / close protection officer. – collection of Scottish ceremonial dress paraphernalia. – Gordon Highlander officers dirk, early Victorian era, with insignia '92' and Sphinx. £2,000 – Scottish officer's pistol from London 1770s, £3,000 – early 19th century silver sporran £500, – silver Powder horn, 1838 £1,500, – Painting of Japanese Zen Archers (Kyūdō) by Mortimer Menpes, 1890s, £10,000 at auction, £15,000 retail
29/22; 25 March 2007	Kelvingrove Art Gallery and Museum; Glasgow	Michael Aspel	
29/23; 1 April 2007	Kelvingrove Art Gallery and Museum; Glasgow	Michael Aspel &	
29/24; 8 April 2007	Tavistock, Devon	Michael Aspel &	
29/25; 15 April 2007	Lacock Abbey; Lacock; Wiltshire	Michael Aspel &	
29/26; 22 April 2007	Lacock Abbey; Lacock; Wiltshire	Michael Aspel &	
3 September 2006	Antiques Roadshow; Greatest Finds		
29 April 2007	Rectrospective; The Unseen Items; Compilation Episode	Michael Aspel &	
