= List of antiques experts =

This is a list of notable antiques experts.

== Antiques experts ==
Paul Atterbury examines a clock on the Antiques Roadshow.

- Paul Atterbury
- Jon Baddeley
- David Barby
- David Battie
- Kate Bliss
- John Bly
- Eileen Rose Busby
- Bunny Campione
- Wes Cowan
- Norman Crider
- Alastair Dickenson
- David Dickinson
- Dendy Easton
- Clive Farahar
- Helaine Fendelman
- Yosef Goldman
- Paul Hayes
- Jonty Hearnden
- Esta Henry
- Mark Hill
- Michael Hogben
- Lenon Hoyte
- Soame Jenyns
- Margaret Jourdain
- Hilary Kay
- Leigh and Leslie Keno
- Eric Knowles
- Ralph and Terry Kovel
- Graham Lay
- Rupert Maas
- Cordelia Mendoza
- Judith Miller
- Geoffrey Munn
- Peter Nahum
- Andrew Nebbett
- Arthur Negus
- Natasha Raskin Sharp
- Israel Sack
- Henry Sandon
- John Sandon
- Philip Serrell
- Lars Tharp
