= Antiques Roadshow (series 27) =

2004-2005 series of the British TV show

Antiques Roadshow is a British television series produced by the BBC since 1979. Series 27 (2004/05) comprised 25 editions that were broadcast by the BBC from 5 September 2004 – 20 March 2005

The dates in brackets given below are the dates each episode was filmed at the location. The date not in brackets is the episode's first UK airing date on BBC One.

Series / Episode Aired	Location	Host and experts	Notes
27/1; 5/9/2004	Portmeirion; North Wales	Michael Aspel & Andrew Davis; Christopher Payne; Paul Atterbury; Hilary Kay; Lars Tharp; Eric Knowles	– intricate mosaics – items made by prisoners of war as gifts of thanks – a penknife valued at £1,500 – a contender for Champion Collector of the UK.
27/2; 12/9/2004	Haltwhistle; Northumberland	Michael Aspel & John Benjamin; Andrew Davis; Paul Atterbury; Lars Tharp; Eric Knowles	– fittings from RMS Olympic (Titanic's sister ship) – an Ancient Roman coin found at Hadrian's Wall – a letter from J. R. R. Tolkien about The Lord of the Rings – the largest collection of royal memorabilia.
27/3; 19/9/2004	Hastings; Sussex	Michael Aspel & Paul Atterbury; David Battie; Christopher Payne; Richard Price; John Axford; Hilary Kay	– a Meissen porcelain pot valued at £10,000, – a "doodle" by Augustus John – an unopened chest containing a wedding gift from the 1920s – a collector of Punch & Judy paraphernalia.
27/4; 26/9/2004	Witley Court; Worcestershire	Michael Aspel & John Benjamin; Richard Price; David Battie; Paul Atterbury; Lars Tharp; John Sandon	– Great Witley church – Witley Court decorated by John Nash and Samuel Daukes for Lord Ward, later Earl of Dudley – collection of 1920s theatrical puppets. c.£100 each – bronze 'Shellay' hearth sculpture from Witley Court, half woman half lion, £1,500 – collection of period clothing, – brown stoneware flask, marked W Jordan, "Cock and Hoop", London 1840s. £300 – late 19th-century Japanese fake of 'porcelain made in China, decorated in Europe (Netherlands and England) in Chinese style.' Erroneously marked as 'Emperor Knoshi' 1672, – value £150 – L. S. Lowry drawing, #12 in series, 1967, £9,000 – Gilt Ormolu clock with two horizontal 'chapter rings' instead of a dial, Sold by W Davis and Sons, of Birmingham, made by Japy Frères of France. £4,000 – 1930s Teddy Tail, toy mouse, from the eponymous cartoon strip in the Daily Mail drawn by Charles Folkard. Made by Chad Valley. £800 – bronze head of Romilly John (son of Augustus John) by Sir Jacob Epstein, made in 1907, £15,000 – Tig jug (with three handles), decorated for Ann Barrett 1678, Staffordshire Potteries slipware made by trailing brown clay over yellow clay and combing for effect, £50,000
27/5; 3/10/2004	Magna Centre; Rotherham	Michael Aspel & Christopher Payne; David Battie; Lars Tharp; Dominic Winter	– a clock given by Queen Victoria – a stash of silver – Beatles memorabilia – one of the largest pieces ever on a Roadshow.
27/6; 10/10/2004	National Archives at Kew; Kew; London Borough of Richmond upon Thames	Michael Aspel & Christopher Payne; David Battie; Paul Atterbury; Eric Knowles	– the Domesday Book – the SOS telegram sent from the RMS Titanic – a picture made out of human hair, – a Mahogany Chest (furniture) given by King James I of England – early papers of the Suffragettes.
27/7; 17/10/2004	Hampton Court Palace; London Borough of Richmond upon Thames	Michael Aspel & Richard Price; Hilary Kay	– a bronze by Auguste Rodin – a Longcase clock – a sketch by Piet Mondrian valued between £50–70,000.
27/8; 24/10/2004	Hampton Court Palace; London Borough of Richmond upon Thames	Michael Aspel & Richard Price; David Battie; Hilary Kay	– a coral bracelet valued at £30,000, – an unusual doll, – a dress by Vivienne Westwood – a pendant carried up and down Mount Everest 3 times.
27/9; 31/10/2004	Hornsea; East Riding of Yorkshire	Michael Aspel & Martin Levy; Eric Knowles; Lars Tharp; Hilary Kay; David Battie; Ian Harris	– a chastity belt dug up on a farm, – an 1875 sewing machine – Beatles memorabilia – over 40 Humber cars, one owned by Edward VIII and Mrs Simpson.
27/10; 7/11/2004	Dyrham Park; Gloucestershire	Michael Aspel & John Axford; Christopher Payne; Lars Tharp	– an 18th-century court dress worth £10,000, – a silver beaker – a brooch given by the Queen Mother to her Head Chef
27/11; 14/11/2004	Edinburgh	Michael Aspel & Martin Levy; Ian Harris; Hilary Kay; Lars Tharp; Eric Knowles	– a Russian cigarette case valued at £5,000, – a 19th-century trinket depicting types of torture – a lock of Beethoven's hair presented at his funeral.
27/12; 21/11/2004	Wilton House; Wilton; Wiltshire	Michael Aspel & David Battie; Hilary Kay; Lars Tharp; Eric Knowles	– 200 typewriters – a suffragette doll dressed from women protestors prison uniforms – a ring worn by Princess Elizabeth of England in 1635, – an ornate table, transported in a horsebox, valued at £30,000
27/13; 28/11/2004	City Hall, Cardiff; Cardiff	Michael Aspel & Richard Price; David Battie; Eric Knowles	– a painting bought for 10p now valued at £700-£1,000, – a rare Prince of Wales tea caddy, – a clock valued at up to £35,000
27/14; 5/12/2004	Cardiff Castle; Cardiff	Michael Aspel &	– an African witch doctor's ceremonial stick, – a schoolboy's exercise book from 1745 – a Scandinavian tankard valued at £12,000.
27/15; 12/12/2004	King's College, Cambridge; Cambridge	Michael Aspel & John Axford; Hilary Kay; Paul Atterbury; David Battie; Christopher Payne; Richard Price; Gordon Lang; Nicholas Mitchell; John Benjamin	– a letter from Florence Nightingale, – the racing silk of a famous jockey, – a collection of old wedding photographs – an Art Deco diamond brooch found in wartime London.
27/16; 19/12/2004	King's College, Cambridge; Cambridge	Michael Aspel & Hilary Kay; Paul Atterbury; David Battie; Christopher Payne	– small 1870s 'Albion press' Printing press – manufactured under licence by Frederick Ullmer Ltd, £2000 – Needlework picture of Bolton Abbey by Ruth Whiteside. c1880s, based on Edwin Henry Landseer. £1,500 – Needlework sampler £1,000 – painting on copper of Pope Gregory XIII, £500 – collection of silverware including 1776 Salver by Richard Rugg, £3,000 – Chinese porcelain whistles, (bond asheen) from south China, c.1660, £1,000 – portfolio of Graphic designs for commercial products, 1910s, £40 each – toy train set, 1913, steam powered steam engine, hand enamelled, £3,500 – shotgun cartridge case converted to contain shooting 'place-finders' (shortest straw). £1,000 – caricature drawings of & by both Sir William Nicholson (artist), and Sir Edwin Lutyens, £2,000 – Japanese enamelled porcelain statue of the 'rice god' Daikoku-ten, 1660, £5,000 – Painting by jdm (crew member) of HMS Triumph on way home at Magellan Straits, – Pye Ltd. mid 20th century radios and televisions, Art Deco radio of the Jazz Age, – gold decorated Royal Worcester blue plate, painted by Thomas Bott in the Limoges porcelain enamel style £1,500 – Omar Ramsden enamel inkwell, Citroen car design, £2,500 – collection of machine guns: Vickers gun and Lewis gun. Owned by Machine Gun Corps (MGC) member's. Vickers – £1,200, Lewis £750 – cigarette card collection from 1890s – cards of fish and animals up to £150; original drawings £5,000; – tea service and teapot by E Wealdon, Derby, Wealdonware, type of creamy Wedgewood, (or William Maybatch?), – vesta case figurine of crocodile eating traveller, 19th century, £1,000 – town plan of Philadelphia, 1775, authorised by R.M. Penn, grandson of William Penn, £10,000 – blue Japanese pot, decorated with silver sparrows, £4,000
27/17; 26/12/2004	The Next; Generation, Thinktank; Birmingham	Michael Aspel & Hilary Kay; Lars Tharp; David Battie; Eric Knowles; Paul Atterbury	
27/18; 2/1/2005	Tyntesfield; House; Tyntesfield; Bristol	Michael Aspel & Hilary Kay; Paul Atterbury; David Battie; Christopher Payne; Nicholas Mitchell	– a silver grape holder made from silver, – a cabinet of rare microscope slides – a ruby and diamond brooch valued at £30,000 – a collector with over 150,000 buttons.
27/19; 9/1/2005	Stornoway; Isle of Lewis; Outer Hebrides, Scotland	Michael Aspel & Ian Harris; David Battie; Paul Atterbury; Lars Tharp; Nicholas Mitchell	– early medical instruments, – a table made from wood salvaged from a shipwreck – a modern painting by Hoggan valued at £20,000.
27/20; 16/1/2005	Victoria Baths; Manchester	Michael Aspel & Christopher Payne; Paul Atterbury; Hilary Kay; Eric Knowles	– an Art Deco cigarette case valued at £3,500, – a shock therapy machine, – an ornate pedestal valued at £15,000.
27/21; 23/1/2005	HMS Victory; Portsmouth	Michael Aspel & Martin Levy; John Benjamin; Christopher Payne; David Battie; Hilary Kay	– Scrimshaw Ostrich eggs carved by Lord Nelson's crew – box made from debris taken from HMS Victory after the Battle of Trafalgar.
27/22; 30/1/2005	The Leisure Centre; Abergavenny; Wales	Michael Aspel &	– Big Pit National Coal Museum – Royal Doulton jug, 1935, depicting King George V and Queen Mary, designed by Charles Noake, £700 – cabinet, art furniture, 1870s, ebonised, emulating lacquer furniture, oriental origin, inlaid with free painted tiles, by Walter Crane, or Mintons an Hollins or Wedgwood, plantstand/Jardiniere, £800 – Swiss singing bird box. Twittering pop-up bird on an enamelled silver box. late 19th century, hummingbird feathers, £4,000 – Tower Bridge toy, 1950s, made in Germany, £75 – electroplated English urn, 1880, £500 – drawing of 'business strategy proposal' for milk production, design study for 1923 railway milk transportation business. – Beatles memorabillia – photograph album from Abergavenny 1963, signed by all the Beatles, £15,000 – collection of drawings by Persis Kolmsey, 1920s, £2,000 – Gilded baptismal spoon with Saint Andrew on handle, 1634 (Charles I of England) by Richard Cross, £2,000 – Scottish longcase regulator clock, used for astronomical observation or as Jewellers master clock, made by 'Robert Bryson & Sons', Clock and Watch-Maker of Edinburgh. (Sons Robert and Alexander), c.1830, £4,000 – oil painting by George Bernard O'Neill, of a Victorian girl on Mayday, £7,000 – Georgian Tallboy (furniture) – Indian fakes of 19th century Swiss pocket watches £30 – Scrimshaw 'love token' with whaling scenes, £2,000 – necklace made in Ceylon or India, with mixture of gems including heania garnet, Amethyst, Sapphire, Garnet, Turquoise, £8,000 – serving-table, 1770s, £4,000 – Teddybear by Margarete Steiff GmbH, 1910, £1,500 – Art Nouveau biscuit barrel, in English Tudric pewter, 1900s. Designed for Liberty (department store) by Archibald Knox (designer), made by Hasler. £800 – collection of carnival glass and lustre jugs. Royal Worcester porcelain jug – £500 – pair of silver gravy boats in the style of the 1740s, by 'Edward Barnard & Sons Ltd', 1821, part of the Rococo revival, £5,000 pair – pair of fake silver cream boats, marked 1735 and 1736, Paul de Lamerie, (1688–1751). Probably a pair of de Lamerie salt cellars reshaped as cream boats. Illegal to sell. – Staffordshire Potteries scene of 1848 Murders at Stanfield Hall, when James Blomfield Rush murdered, Isaac Jermy and his son Isaac Jermy Jermy. £5,000
27/23; 13/2/2005	Ipswich; East Anglia	Michael Aspel & Natalie Harris; Lars Tharp; Paul Atterbury; Christopher Payne; Ian Harris; Nicholas Mitchell	– an early American flag, – a silver tankard valued at £50,000 – a pair of spectacles worn by Napoleon – a man with 5,000 Dinky Toys.
27/24; 20/2/2005	Dartington Hall; Totnes; Devon	Michael Aspel & Keith Baker; Paul Atterbury	– 1851 bust by William Feed (born 1804) £6,000 – blue enamel cuff links with diamonds and Fleur-de-lis and crown motifs. Gift from George, Prince of Wales between 1905–1910, £3,500 – Rudolf Gustave Mueller painting on wood panel (1836) of middle east street market, mounted in ornate in arabesque frame, £15,000 – Royal Doulton 'Lambeth pot' decorated by Eliza Simmonds, mounted as an umbrella stand, 1883, £1,000 – Royal Doulton pot by Hanna Barlow, decorated by incising wet clay and 'Scrafito drawing, 1884, £1,000 – 1884 miniature Royal Doulton pot £70 – Longcase clock by Richard Lear Pinhay (also spelled 'Pinhey') of Plymouth dock, 1775–1789 £6,500 – collection of 900 dolls including Simon and Halbig and Betty Oxo – 1830s writing desk in Biedermeier style, courtly style of Paris, Vienna and Berlin, £4,500 – American Art glass by Lewis Comfort Tiffany, decorated Iridescence gold, 1900s, marked Fabriole. Flower bowl, £200; Salt bowl £300; Vase/bottle £1,500 – Cricketana – lead Jardiniere decorated with cricket motifs, and medallions of W. G. Grace, £1,500 – set of Japanese style concentric pots by Bernard Leach, signed 'BL St Ives', £2,000 – complex extending occasional table, late 19th century, £500 – 1920s travelling clock made in solid silver enamelled and machined solid silver, and retailed by Cartier £1200 – Presentation catalogue 'of and by' Gilbert and George, London 1970, £2,000 – collection of church silver, some inscribed by the Bampfylde family, Lords of the manor. 'Tatsa' plate made in 1710 by John Elston, £6,000; George I of Great Britain flagon, made in 1715 (with 1880s Victorian spout), £12,000; Elizabethan chalice from 1570, £10,000 – a letter from Lord Nelson
27/25; 13/3/2005	Dartington Hall; Totnes; Devon	Michael Aspel & John Benjamin; Keith Baker; Ian Harris; Paul Atterbury	– decorated china Piggy bank by the Bovey Tracey Pottery company for Jan Plichta £1,500 – two model railway engines: The Lion 1838 from Liverpool and Manchester Railway £1,500 and Britannia 1951, £3,000 – picture of brown trout, signed J.S. Target, £1,800 – pair of 1880s clobbered (over decorated) Japanese export vases. Base made in England by James Edgar of Liverpool. £800 for one, £6,000 pair. – Georgian silver owl drinking cup, hallmarked London 1818, £10,000 – 17th century desk, in the Bargueño/Vargueño style (prototype of an English Escritoire), stand decorated with ironwork, walnut and red velvet and . £4,500 – decorated plate, 1870s, a painting on pottery by William Stephen Coleman (WS Coleman) of Mintons pottery London, (an associate of James Abbott McNeill Whistler and the Pre-Raphaelite Brotherhood, £4,000 – ring with Columbian emerald set in diamonds, 1910–1915, (in the contemporaneous style of Cartier & Tiffany), 3.5 carats, £10,000 – collection of Margarete Steiff GmbH bears and stuffed animals, including 1905 Peter Rabbit £10,000 – memorabilia of Quentin Crisp, letters and drawings plus inscribed copy of The Naked Civil Servant, – £2,000 – Arts and Crafts movement Jewellery by Charles Sargeant Jagger, (sculptor): ring £500; ring £800; pendant £1,500 – Chinese porcelain bowl repaired with rivets, £200 – collection of early 19th century Scrimshaw, .... £2,000 – 'Pearlware' 'char dish' made in Lancashire, 1790s, £300 – Chinese monkey statue made for export to Europe, 1760s, £3,000 for pair – 16th century Limoges porcelain plate, enamel on copper. Harvest scene labelled Aoust (old form of Août, August), £3,000 – 1780s 'mock pendulum' clock by William Allam of London, anchor escapement, £6,000 – French side cabinet, (meuble d'acquis), one of a pair made for the Exposition Universelle (1855) (aka Great Paris Exhibition), the other is at the Prince's Palace of Monaco. Designed in Napoleon III style, made in the Gobelins Manufactory in Paris. value up to £15,000 for insurance.
27/26; 20/3/2005	Retrospective episode	Michael Aspel & John Benjamin; Richard Price; Christopher Payne	– Staffordshire pot worth £50,000
