= Antiques Roadshow (series 26) =

2003–2004 series of the British TV show

Antiques Roadshow is a British television series produced by the BBC since 1979. Series 26 (2003/04) comprised 25 editions that were broadcast by the BBC from 7 September 2003 – March 2004

The dates in brackets given below are the dates each episode was filmed at the location. The date not in brackets is the episode's first UK airing date on BBC One.

Series / Episode Aired	Location	Host & Experts	Notes
26/1; 7 September 2003	Sudeley Castle; Winchcombe; Gloucestershire	Michael Aspel & Gordon Lang; David Battie; Paul Atterbury; Hilary Kay	– Aspel arrives in the Citroen 2CV with the grandfather clock sticking up through its roof.
26/2; 14 September 2003	Bala; Snowdonia; Wales	Michael Aspel & David Battie; Eric Knowles; John Axford; Andrew Davis	–
26/3; 21 September 2003	Burton Upon Trent	Michael Aspel & Lars Tharp; David Battie; Gordon Lang; Martin Levy; Natalie Harris; John Benjamin; Nicholas Mitchell; Ian Harris; Richard Price	–
26/4; 28 September 2003	Carnbrea Leisure Centre; Redruth	Michael Aspel & Natalie Harris; Andrew Davis; Christopher Payne; David Battie; Paul Atterbury; Hilary Kay	– the house where William Murdoch invented gas lighting.
26/5; 5 October 2003	National Maritime Museum; Falmouth	Michael Aspel & David Battie; Andrew Davis; Hilary Kay	– Suhaili, round the world boat of Sir Robin Knox-Johnston
26/6; 12 October 2003	Dumfries Ice Bowl; Dumfries	Michael Aspel & Hilary Kay; Lars Tharp; John Benjamin; Richard Price; David Battie; Paul Atterbury	–
26/7; 19 October 2003	Cressing Temple Barns; Cressing Temple; Essex	Michael Aspel & Christopher Wood; Andrew Davis; David Battie; Paul Atterbury; Lars Tharp	– the way things were, when the horse, the plough and the wagon reigned supreme.
26/8; 26 October 2003	Chichester Cathedral; Chichester	Michael Aspel & Nicholas Mitchell; Natalie Harris; Ian Harris; David Battie; Eric Knowles	– new episode showing unseen moments filmed in series 25
26/9; 2 November 2003	Kendal Castle; Kendal	Michael Aspel & Eric Knowles; Lars Tharp; Hilary Kay; Paul Atterbury; David Battie; Natalie Harris; Ian Harri; Christopher Payne	– birthplace of Katherine Parr – artifacts of hill walker and writer Alfred Wainwright who was also honorary curator of the museum. Including office desk, pipe and socks.
26/10; 9 November 2003	Dyrham Park; Dyrham; Gloucestershire	Michael Aspel & Christopher Payne; Gordon Lang; Paul Atterbury; Lars Tharp	– Dyrham in old English means a valley frequented by deer. – Dyrham Park was owned by the Wynter family for many generations. – Harriet Wynter married a civil servant called William Blathwayt who remodelled the Elizabethan manor house, the west front by Samuel Hauduroy and the east front by William Talman, King William III's architect. – Blathwayt also redesigned the grounds into formal gardens with cascades, parterres and forest walks. But by the time it was completed, around 1717, it was out of fashion and the gardens had disappeared within 100 years. –
26/11; 16 November 2003	Dyrham Park Compilation	Michael Aspel & John Benjamin; Richard Price; David Battie; Paul Atterbury; Lars Tharp	–
26/12; 23 November 2003	Boston; Lincolnshire	Michael Aspel & Christopher Wood; David Battie; Lars Tharp	– Bostonian ancestors founded Boston, Massachusetts. – named after the 6th century missionary, St. Botolph.
26/13; 30 November 2003	Clitheroe	Michael Aspel & Natalie Harris; Christopher Wood; John Baddeley; Gordon Lang; Hilary Kay; Lars Tharp	– the old industries were clog making and cotton milling – the most important current employer is't quarry.
26/14; 7 December 2003	Abergavenny	Michael Aspel & Christopher Payne	– the once thriving colliery is now a museum
26/15; 14 December 2003	Mount Stewart	Michael Aspel & Nicholas Mitchell; Christopher Wood{ Richard Price; Gordon Lang; David Battie; Eric Knowles	– the gardens at Mount Stewart were designed 80 years ago by Edith Vane-Tempest-Stewart, Marchioness of Londonderry, wife of Charles Vane-Tempest-Stewart, 7th Marquess of Londonderry.
26/16; 21 December 2003	Mount Stewart; Episode 2	Michael Aspel & Nicholas Mitchell; Christopher Wood; Richard Price; Gordon Lang; David Battie; Eric Knowles	–
28 December 2003	Next Generation	Michael Aspel & Natalie Harris; John Benjamin; David Battie; Paul Atterbury; Hilary Kay; Lars Tharp	–
26/17; 4 January 2004	Woburn Abbey	Michael Aspel & David Battie; Paul Atterbury; Hilary Kay; Lars Tharp; Eric Knowles	– history of the Russells Duke of Bedford who have owned Woburn Abbey for 500 years. The main characters and builders who shaped the Abbey and on how parts of the building have gone into decline. The Abbey has been reinvented to create income, cover death duties and maintenance.
26/18; 11 January 2004	Woburn Abbey; Special	Michael Aspel &	–
26/19; 18 January 2004	Scarborough, North Yorkshire	Michael Aspel & Eric Knowles; Hilary Kay; Paul Atterbury; Gordon Lang; Christopher Payne; Ian Harris; Andrew Davis; Natalie Harris	– t'Grand Hotel (Scarborough) on t'seafront, t'Spa and its sun terrace, majestic ironwork bridges, Scarborough funiculars which have been running since 1875 and the grandiose local museum.
26/20; 25 January 2004	St Ives; Cambridgeshire	Michael Aspel & Richard Price; Ian Harris; Gordon Lang; Paul Atterbury; Hilary Kay; Lars Tharp	– by the River Great Ouse with rich soil of the Great Fen. Wool and cattle town, 70 pubs served the local farmers.
26/21; 1 February 2004	Royal Hospital Halsar; Gosport Peninsula	Michael Aspel & Lars Tharp; Hilary Kay; Richard Price; Christopher Payne; Gordon Lang; John Baddeley	– Royal Hospital Haslar was designed by architect, Theodore Jacobsen. – Scottish physician James Lind was one of the first in charge and known as the "Father of Nautical Medicine". He pioneered citrus juice as a treatment for scurvy
26/22; 8 February 2004		Michael Aspel &	–
26/23; 13 February 2004		Michael Aspel &	–
26/24; 20 February 2004		Michael Aspel &	–
26/25; 13 March 2004		Michael Aspel &	–
26/26; 20 March 2004		Michael Aspel &	–
