= Ronnie Archer-Morgan =

British television presenter (born 1950)

- Born: 1950 (age 75–76)
- Occupations: Antiques collector and television presenter
- Known for: Appearance on the Antiques Roadshow since 2011
- Television: Antiques Roadshow; Millionaire Hoarders

Ronnie Archer-Morgan (Note: Also Archer Morgan) (born 1950) is a television presenter and antiques collector, known for his appearance on the BBC Antiques Roadshow since 2011. He is also known for presenting the 2023 Channel 4 show Millionaire Hoarders, in which experts seek out valuable antiques from the homes of the rich. He is also known for appearing on Find it, Fix it, Flog it as an expert valuer.

== Early life and education ==
Ronnie Archer-Morgan was born in 1950 to Lizzie, a Sierra Leonean from a wealthy family, and Ronald, a British engineer living there. When Lizzie became pregnant, they moved to Britain in order to start a new life. Tragically, Ronald was killed in a car accident shortly afterwards, before Ronnie was born. This caused Lizzie to have a breakdown, and Ronnie was taken away from her and given to foster parents. Then, at age three, he was moved to a National Children's Home (now Action for Children) in Southport, Merseyside. Just before his sixth birthday, he was sent back to live with his mother, and half-sister Lynette. Archer-Morgan was abused by his mother, at first bullying, before escalating into physical torture, including multiple attempted murders. However, these went under the radar because of Lizzie's popularity and respected nature.

He would use museums as a form of escapism from his home life, which kindled his love for antiques. His mother remarried to an abusive husband, and Archer-Morgan, now eleven, was taken back into care with his sister, where he remained for another five years. Aged seventeen, he secured a place at Hornsey College of Art, but dropped out only a few weeks after starting, citing the reason to be boredom at simply replicating others.

== Career ==
Before becoming an antiques collector, Archer-Morgan had various careers. He became a DJ at the famous Marquee Club in Soho. Then a friend who was a hairdresser suggested the industry for Archer-Morgan, and within 18 months, he had become a stylist at a top Knightsbridge salon. While working there, Archer-Morgan would use his lunch break to scour local shops and markets for antiques, which he would then sell to his clients, often for a profit. This kickstarted his 30+ year career in antiques. He worked as a consultant to Sotheby's on their wristwatch and costume jewellery collections, as well as opening his own antiques gallery in Knightsbridge.

He joined the Antiques Roadshow in 2011, specialising in the 'miscellaneous' section of the show, but mainly valuing tribal art and weaponry. During an episode of the Antiques Roadshow in 2019, part of the 40th anniversary series, Archer-Morgan met a collector who had brought Sooty and Sweep glove puppets, as her father had made the puppets for Harry Corbett. Archer-Morgan had met Corbett in 1955, during a visit to the children's home in Merseyside that Archer-Morgan was staying in. Following the episode, Archer-Morgan received a letter from his former foster family. Through this, he also managed to reunite with a long lost childhood friend, who had lost contact with Archer-Morgan when Ronnie was removed from the home they were in.

Archer-Morgan now works as a consultant to Dore & Rees auctions in Frome, Somerset. He also works independently as a specialist for private clients. He published his autobiography, Would It Surprise You To Know...?, in 2022. The book's title is his Antiques Roadshow catchphrase.

In August 2023, Archer-Morgan featured in the three-part series Millionaire Hoarders, in which he and three other experts sought out valuable antiques from the homes of the rich. During the first episode, he found a John Constable painting worth up to £2,000,000 previously said to be fake at Craufurdland Castle, Scotland. Auctioning the painting could save the family from having to sell the estate that has been in their family for 800 years, in the face of maintenance costs.

== Personal life ==
Archer-Morgan has cited his greatest passion as collecting records, and listening to music. He has campaigned for Action for Children, with his ongoing support for the charity being deeply personal. In an interview with the Daily Telegraph, he said that "If it wasn't for Action for Children I would be dead.” He has a partner but lives alone in London. He has no children but has said that he wanted to be a father.

== Bibliography ==
- Would it Surprise You to Know? (2022; ISBN 9781529157543)

== See also ==
- David Battie
- Paul Atterbury
- Jon Baddeley
