= Hugh Scully =

British television presenter (1943–2015)

- Born: Michael Hugh Scully; 5 March 1943; Bradford-on-Avon, Wiltshire, England
- Died: 8 October 2015 (aged 72); Tresillian, Cornwall, England
- Education: Prior Park College
- Occupation: Broadcaster
- Spouse: Barbara Dean (m. 1966; died 2009)
- Children: 2

Michael Hugh Scully (5 March 1943 – 8 October 2015) was an English journalist, radio and television presenter. He was the host and longest-serving presenter of the BBC programme Antiques Roadshow from 1981 to 2000.

== Early life ==
Born in Bradford-on-Avon, Wiltshire, Scully spent much of his childhood in Malta and Egypt, where his father was stationed with the Royal Air Force. From the age of thirteen, he was educated at Prior Park College, a boarding school in Bath, Somerset and, after leaving, worked for a period with the piano company Steinway & Sons. For a short time he worked as a record producer at Saga Records in London.

== Career ==
Scully auditioned successfully as a temporary newsreader on BBC radio, and made his debut regular radio broadcast reporting from Southampton in 1963.

Always a freelance journalist rather than an employee, Scully worked on BBC News magazines and was a presenter on the BBC South West news programme Spotlight from 1965, before joining the networked news programme Nationwide. After a producer discovered that he collected antiques, he became chairman of the radio show Talking about Antiques in 1967 and Collector's World in 1970.

Scully was chosen in 1981 to present Antiques Roadshow, along with Arthur Negus. Negus retired in 1983, and Scully was the sole host on that show for 17 years. He resigned as presenter in 2000, to join Internet auction company QXL.com and help launch its on-line antiques business, and was replaced by Michael Aspel. From 1988, Scully ran a television production company, Fine Art Productions; he also hosted the episode on Stately Homes, part of the Britain's Finest series in 2003 for Channel 5. He was married to his wife Barbara for 43 years before she died on 9 March 2009.

== Death ==
Scully died on 8 October 2015, at the age of 72, in his home in Tresillian, Cornwall. He is survived by his two sons.

Preceded by Arthur Negus	Host of Antiques Roadshow; 1981–2000	Succeeded by Michael Aspel
