= Going for a Song =

British TV game show (1965–2002)

- Genre: Game show
- Created by: John King
- Presented by: Max Robertson; Michael Parkinson; Anne Robinson; Michael Aspel
- Starring: Arthur Negus; Eric Knowles
- Theme music composer: "The Birds" by Ottorino Respighi
- Country of origin: United Kingdom
- Original language: English
- No. of series: 13 (original); 8 (revival)
- No. of episodes: 226 (original); 349 (revival)

Production
- Production locations: Broadcasting House, Bristol (1965–1977); Pebble Mill Studios (1995–2002)
- Running time: 25 minutes
- Production companies: BBC Bristol (1965–1977); Maverick Television and BBC Pebble Mill (1995–2002)

Original release
- Network: BBC1
- Release: 31 March 1965 – 16 October 1977
- Release: 29 August 1995 – 3 February 2002

Going for a Song is a British game show that originally aired on BBC1 from 31 March 1965 to 16 October 1977 and hosted by Max Robertson, with Arthur Negus appearing as the resident expert and antique valuer. It was revived on the same channel from 29 August 1995 to 3 February 2002, the revival was first hosted by Michael Parkinson from 1995 to 1999, then by Anne Robinson in 2000 and finally by Michael Aspel from 2001 to 2002, with Eric Knowles as the resident antiques expert for the entire run of the revival.

== Format ==
The host would introduce an antique to a panel of antique experts, valuers and celebrity panellists, who would examine the object and estimate its date and value. The antiques expert would then present its actual age and worth. Midway through the show, the host would also present a piece of furniture which he would give detailed information about; this was done to effectively break the show into two segments and allow the panellists to relax and listen midway through the show.

== Transmissions ==
=== Original ===
Series	Start date	End date	Episodes
1	31 March 1965	30 June 1965	14
2	6 October 1965	24 June 1966	26
3	27 July 1966	28 March 1967	29
4	25 August 1967	10 November 1967	12
5	5 January 1968	24 May 1968	21
6	6 October 1968	29 December 1968	12
7	19 January 1969	11 May 1969	17
8	14 September 1969	9 November 1969	9
9	1 March 1970	31 May 1970	14
10	9 August 1970	8 November 1970	10
11	25 April 1971	1 August 1971	12
12	10 October 1971	14 November 1971	6
13	26 March 1972	18 June 1972	13
14	7 November 1972	23 January 1973	10
15	22 February 1976	3 September 1976	13
16	28 August 1977	16 October 1977	8

=== Revival ===
Series	Start date	End date	Episodes
1	29 August 1995	8 September 1995	9
2	5 February 1996	9 May 1996	40
3	13 January 1997	1 August 1997	59
4	1 September 1997	13 February 1998	73
5	12 October 1998	21 January 1999	63
6	6 April 1999	16 July 1999	45
7	14 February 2000	1 September 2000	30
8	4 June 2001	3 February 2002	30
