= Suzanne Fagence Cooper =

British non-fiction writer

Suzanne Elizabeth Fagence Cooper is a British non-fiction writer who has written extensively on the Pre-Raphaelites and Victorian women, as well as the English artists and social reformers John Ruskin and Jane and William Morris.

== Education and career ==
Fagence Cooper received a BA in history from University of Oxford and spent 12 years as a curator of the Victorian collections at the Victoria and Albert Museum where she co-curated The Victorian Vision exhibition in 2001. She is an honorary visiting fellow of the University of York.

As well as writing, Fagence Cooper is a design consultant and has worked with the BBC Channel 4 and was a historical consultant for the 2013 film The Invisible Woman. She was a contributor to Fred Dibnah's World of Steam, Steel and Stone for BBC television, including providing a factual, historical perspective on the way Victorian lives can be presented in museums. She is also a Companion of the Guild of St George.

== Personal life ==
Fagence Cooper lives near York, and has two daughters, Rosalind and Beatrice.

== Selected publications ==
- Victorians at Home and Abroad. London: V & A Publications, 2001. ISBN 1851773290 (With Paul Atterbury)
- The Victorian Woman. London: V & A Publications, 2001. ISBN 1851773304
- Pre-Raphaelite Art in the Victoria and Albert Museum. London: V & A Publications, 2003. ISBN 1851773932
- The Model Wife: Effie, Ruskin and Millais. London, Gerald Duckworth & Co., 2010. ISBN 0715638645
- Effie: The Passionate Lives of Effie Gray, John Ruskin and John Everett Millais. St. Martin's Press, 2011. ISBN 978-0-7156-4144-6
- To See Clearly: Why Ruskin Matters. London: Quercus, 2020. ISBN 978-1-5294-1045-7
- How We Might Live: At Home with Jane and William Morris. London: Quercus, 2023. ISBN 978-1-5294-0950-5
- The Ruskin Revival: 1969–2019. London: Pallas Athene, 2023. ISBN 978-1-84368-182-3

== See also ==
- Effie Gray
