= The Arts Society =

The National Association of Decorative and Fine Arts Societies (NADFAS), operating under the name The Arts Society, is a national organisation in the United Kingdom promoting education in the arts, the preservation of artistic heritage and the advancement of the arts.

It was founded in 1968 and operates through a network of membership societies in England, Scotland, Wales, Northern Ireland and the Channel Islands, with a central office in London. There are also member societies in Belgium, Germany, France, Malta, Spain, Australia and New Zealand. It is a registered charity under English law.

The charity was rebranded as The Arts Society in 2017, but retains its official name. Under its new operating name the charity operates across the whole spectrum of arts from garden design through film to music, whilst not forgetting the fine and decorative arts.

As of 2025 The Duchess of Gloucester is the Society's patron, and Hilary Kay is its president.

The charity is governed by a Board of Trustees elected by the member societies. The current Chair is Jeremy Thomas, the Vice Chair is Jo Ward and the Treasurer is Trevor Walters. The permanent staff at the central office are led by Chief Executive Ian Arnold.

Member societies run a programme of talks given by the charity's directory of accredited lecturers. The social side is an important element of the societies with most running short trips or longer holidays. Many societies are involved in one of the charity's three volunteering arms: Arts Volunteering, Heritage Volunteering and Trails of Discovery.

Members receive a quarterly magazine and the newsletters Monthly Highlights with news of arts events of interest and Instant Expert. In 2025 the charity launched a series of Vodcasts Artfully Said and short films on works of art Art Takes available on the Society's You Tube channel.

In 2011, NADFAS published a handbook explaining how to record a church organ, and how to find existing publicly available details of a church organ on the National Pipe Organ Register in the United Kingdom.

In 2020, it launched The Arts Society Connected, a digital platform hosting a series of free online lectures and other arts activities, to support its members and other people aged over 70 who were self-isolating during the COVID-19 pandemic in the United Kingdom.

== See also ==
- AccessArt
- Art Fund
