= Arthur Negus =

Antiques expert and broadcaster

Arthur Negus OBE
- Born: Arthur George Negus; 29 March 1903; Reading, Berkshire, England
- Died: 5 April 1985 (aged 82); Cheltenham, Gloucestershire, England
- Occupations: antiques expert and broadcaster
- Known for: Going for a Song; Antiques Roadshow
- Notable work: Auctioneer with Bruton, Knowles and Co.

Arthur George Negus, OBE (29 March 1903 – 5 April 1985) was a British television personality and antiques expert, specialising in furniture.

== Biography ==
Negus was born in Reading, Berkshire, to Amy Julia Worsley and father Arthur George Negus senior, a cabinet maker. His family had a long history in the antiques business. Negus was educated at Reading School and began running the family business when he was 17, following the death of his father. During the Second World War he was an air-raid warden. He later joined Bruton, Knowles & Co., auctioneers of antiques, based in Gloucester.

For many years Negus lived in Cheltenham, Gloucestershire.

== Broadcasting career ==
His broadcasting career began at the age of 62 when he appeared on the panel of the BBC television series Going for a Song (1965–1977), where he appraised antiques. He quickly became a household name as a result of his slow and distinctive Berkshire speech style, which in turn also made him popular with impersonators. He returned to television with Arthur Negus Enjoys (1982) and, especially, Antiques Roadshow (1979–1983). He also appeared on other TV programmes including several editions of The Generation Game during the time it was presented by Bruce Forsyth and Larry Grayson. Negus also presented the BBC ten-part series The Story Of English Furniture in 1978. Another BBC series Arthur Negus On The Road was broadcast in 1974.

== Honours and legacy ==
Negus was appointed an Officer of the Order of the British Empire (OBE) in 1982 "for services to the appreciation of antiques". He died in 1985 at his home in Cheltenham, one week after having turned 82.

In April 2013 Negus's daughter Anne appeared on the Antiques Roadshow with the Negus family Bible. The Negus family had traced its ownership back to the 1700s.

== Bibliography ==
- Going for a Song: English Furniture (1969)
- The Arthur Negus Guide to English Clocks (1980) – foreword by Negus, remainder of text by David Barket
- A Life Among Antiques: Arthur Negus Talks To Bernard Price (1982)

== Sources ==
Preceded by Angela Rippon	Host of Antiques Roadshow; 1979–1983	Succeeded by Hugh Scully
