= Thomas Bott (painter) =

English painter

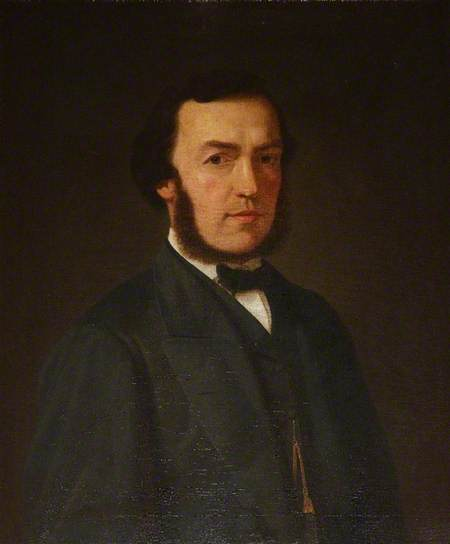
Thomas Bott, self-portrait, 1860s

Thomas Bott (1829–1870) was an English china painter.

== Life ==
Bott was born near Kidderminster, and trained in his father's business of making spade handles. He took up drawing, and found work in a glass factory. He went to Birmingham and for two or three years was a portrait painter.

From Birmingham Bott went in 1852 to Worcester, and became one of the main artists of the Royal Porcelain Works, being hired at the time of innovation with the Worcester enamel. His work in this new medium obtained distinction at Paris Exposition Universelle in 1855, and at the London 1862 International Exhibition.

Bott was attacked by paralysis in the beginning of 1869, and was unable to work from that time. He died on 13 December 1870.
