= Whimsey glass =

Term in workplace culture

Whimsey glass, also known as "whimsy", "whimsies", "wimsy" and "wimsies", and also as friggers or end-of-days (as they were often made at the end of the work day) is work that is created for no useful purpose, so named as it was made on a whim, or whimsey, of the glassmaker. The name may also refer to the fanciful or whimsical style of much of this sort of work.

Glassmakers would make whimsies on their breaks or at the end of the day with any extra molten glass left in the pot. They would often bring the objects home to their families. It became one of the most sought-after styles of glass during the 19th-century, especially representations of boots and shoes, though this style of glass is first recorded in 15th-century Germany. During the 19th century its popularity was as a souvenir but also due to its display in trade exhibitions.

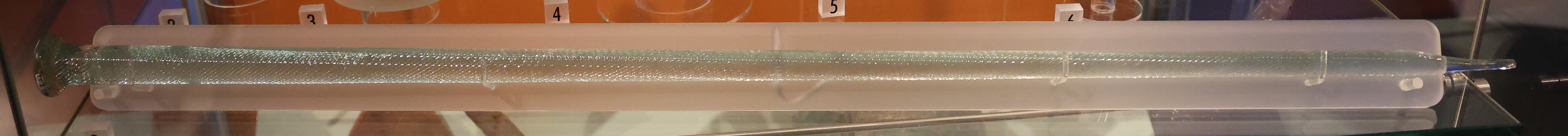
An example of a glass walking stick frigger
