= Royal Worcester fruit painters =

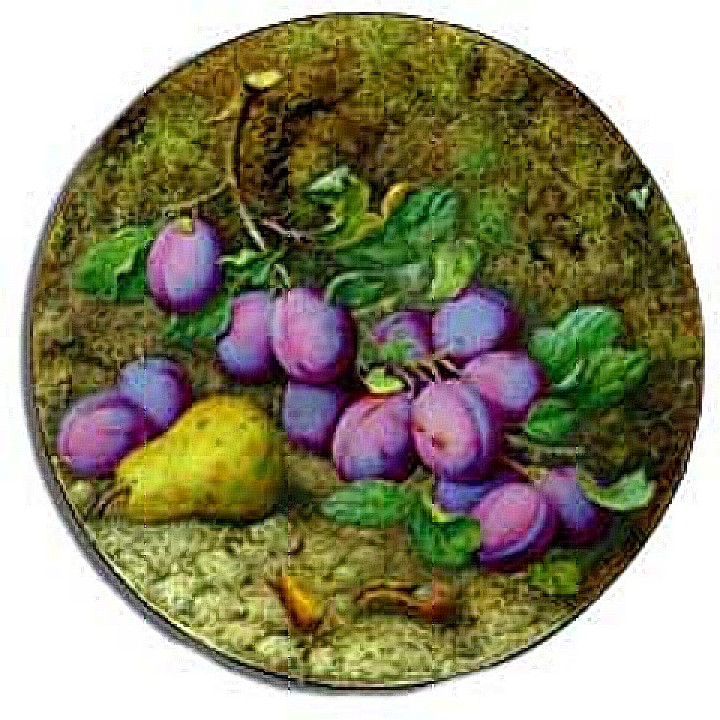
Pershore plums by Octar Copson (1880)

The Royal Worcester fruit painters were a group of painters who specialized in depicting fruits on porcelain tableware. The tradition originated with the painter Octar H. Copson, who in 1880 had also painted a plaque commissioned by a local farmer to commemorate the introduction of the Pershore plum.

Royal Worcester fruit pieces remain highly desirable and have been auctioned for more than $10,000.

== List of Worcester fruit painters ==
- Harry Austin
- Walter Austin
- William Bagnall
- William Bee
- Octar Copson (1872–1880) (possibly returned in the late 1880s)
- John Freeman
- William Hawkins (1874–1928)
- George Johnson (1875–1914)
- Brian Leaman
- Horace Price
- William Ricketts
- Frank Roberts (1872–1920)
- John Stinton
- William Peter Rowley

== External links and References ==
- Antique marks
- Worcester Porcelain Museum
- Royal Worcester artists
