= Jon Baddeley =

Auctioneer, broadcaster, lecturer

Jon Baddeley is a fine art auctioneer, an authority on scientific instruments and collectables, a broadcaster and an author.

== Biography ==
Baddely serves as managing director of Bonhams, Knightsbridge and is responsible for auctions of jewellery, silver, paintings, furniture and works of art, specialist sales of portrait miniatures, arms and armour, sporting guns, coins and medals, science and technology, toys and dolls, and entertainment memorabilia. Baddeley was educated at St Edmund's School in Canterbury.

He began his career at Sotheby's, Belgravia in the early 1970s. He joined as a porter, but quickly rose through the ranks to become Head of the Collectors' department and auctioneer by the age of 25. Subsequently, he left the company to become an independent dealer in decorative arts for the next five years. However, missing the thrill of the auction world, he rejoined Sotheby's in the early 1980s and remained there for the following 20 years, finally becoming Group Head and Board Director of Sotheby's, London.

In 2003, Baddeley joined Bonhams as Global Director of Collectors' sales and over the following seven years was responsible for many landmark auctions and world record prices. Highlights include: the British Airways' Concorde auction, the Admiral Nelson Bicentenary sale, John Lennon's lyrics for Give Peace A Chance, Eric Clapton’s Guitar Collection and the dress worn by actress Judy Garland in the role of Dorothy in the film The Wizard of Oz. He has sold props from the BBC's Doctor Who television programme, a 14th-century English astrolabe quadrant (now in the British Museum), the Michael Bennett-Levy Collection of Early Technology, Peter Golding's Collection of Rock Art and The Ward Collection of Musical Snuff Boxes. In 2010 Baddeley was promoted to managing director of Bonhams, Knightsbridge.

He is the author of the reference book Nautical Antiques and Collectibles, which has been published in the UK and re-printed in France and Germany. Baddeley is also known as a specialist on the BBC's long-running television programme Antiques Roadshow, on which he has made regular appearances since he joined the cast of experts in 1993. In a March 2020 episode of the programme, he valued a prototype fretless electric guitar, once given by the makers, Bartell, to John Lennon and subsequently owned by George Harrison, at £300,000 to £400,000, later saying this as the most valuable item he had assessed for the series.

Baddeley, who was born in London, also is listed in Who's Who 2014. In 2006, while valuing memorabilia belonging to the grandson of Norman Brookes, he revealed he is a distant relation of three times Wimbledon winner Wilfred Baddeley.

== Publications ==
- Baddeley, Jon. Nautical Antiques and Collectables, Philip Wilson Publishers (2003). ISBN 978-0-85667-394-8,
- Baddeley, Jon (Contributor). Antiques Roadshow: How to Spot a Fake, Boxtree Ltd (1999). ISBN 0-7522-1791-7
- Roadshow experts (2000). Lars Tharp (ed.). BBC Antiques Roadshow: A-Z of 20th Century Antiques. Michael Aspel (Foreword). London: Boxtree Ltd. p. 252. ISBN 0-7522-1790-9.
