= Lars Tharp =

Danish antiques expert

Lars Broholm Tharp FSA
- Born: 27 March 1954; Copenhagen, Denmark
- Education: Wyggeston Grammar School for Boys
- Alma mater: Gonville and Caius College, Cambridge
- Occupations: Historian, lecturer and broadcaster
- Notable work: Treasures of Chinese Porcelain (BBC 2011); China in Six Easy Pieces (BBC 2013); Hogarth’s China (1997)
- Television: numerous TV and radio series, documentaries, including (since 1986) Antiques Roadshow Quizeum ‘ (arts quiz) ‘One Man and his Pug’ (Hogarth); ‘Hogarth in Europe’ Tate Exhibition (2021–22) (contributor)
- Spouse: Gillian
- Children: Helena, Georgina
- Awards: HonDArt(DMU), HonDLit (Leicester U), FSA, DL
- Website: www.tharp.co.uk

Lars Broholm Tharp (born 27 March 1954) is a Danish-born British historian, lecturer and broadcaster, and one of the longest running 'experts' on the BBC antiques programme, Antiques Roadshow, first appearing in 1986.

== Early life and education ==
Tharp was born in Copenhagen on 27 March 1954, the son of Harry Tharp and Anne Marie Broholm. His maternal grandfather was the keeper of Antiquities at the National Museum of Denmark, Copenhagen and an expert on the Bronze Age. After moving to England aged six, Lars was educated at Wyggeston Grammar School for Boys in Leicester, England, before studying for an undergraduate degree in Archaeology and Anthropology at Gonville and Caius College, Cambridge.

== Career ==
In 1977, a year after graduating, Tharp began working as an auctioneer at Sotheby's, where he specialised in European and Chinese ceramics. Tharp continued to work with Sotheby's for sixteen years, becoming a director in 1983. He left in 1993 to form his own company, Lars Tharp Ltd. In 2008, he was appointed the Director of the Foundling Museum in London, and Visiting Professor at De Montfort University, Leicester. Since 2010, Tharp has represented the Foundling Museum as its "Hogarth Curator". As a ceramic historian, Tharp also contributed to the major Tate Gallery exhibition "Hogarth and Europe" and during its run from November 2021 to March 2022), he delivered a keynote speech at Colonial Williamsburg, Virginia, U.S.

Tharp is also well known for his regular appearances (1986 to present) as a ceramics expert on the BBC's globally-viewed programme Antiques Roadshow.

Representing Gonville & Caius College, Cambridge, he joined team-members Helen Castor, Mark Damazer (captain) and Quentin Stafford-Fraser to win the Alumni University Challenge 2013.

Tharp is a noted William Hogarth enthusiast. Noting the artist's theatrical use of ceramics in his paintings and prints, he wrote "Hogarth's China" to accompany an exhibition timed to commemorate the artist's tercentenary (1997). The exhibition was expanded and ran at Wedgwood in the following year.

Tharp devised three further exhibitions for York Museum Trust under the umbrella "Celebrating Ceramic"' (2003). He was a member of YMT's steering group setting up their Centre of Ceramic Art (CoCA).

Tharp has received two honorary doctorates: from De Montfort University (HonDArt); and from Leicester University (HonDLitt) and was elected Fellow of the Society of Antiquaries of London in 2010. He serves on the court of England's oldest recorded guild, the Worshipful Company of Weavers (est. by 1130 AD).

An accredited speaker for (inter alia) The Arts Society (NADFAS), Tharp lectures throughout Europe, Asia and Australasia and leads cultural tours to China, Dresden, Scandinavia and within the UK.

In February 2021, Tharp was made a Deputy Lieutenant of Leicestershire.

== Personal life ==
Tharp lives in Leicestershire with his wife Gillian Block, whom he married in 1983. They have two daughters, Helena and Georgina, who share a birthday.

Apart from antiques, Tharp has a particular interest in music, having played the cello since the age of eight. He also lists travel among his interests, leading cultural tours in Britain, China and Scandinavia.

== Media appearances ==
=== Television ===
All BBC unless stated:

- Quizeum (2015) – panellist
- University Challenge (Alumni) – panellist Gonville & Caius College, Cambridge (series winner, 2013/4)
- One Man and his Pug -in search of Hogarth's 'Trump' (2013
- China in Six Easy Pieces (2013) – presenter, writer
- Treasures of Chinese Porcelain (2011) – presenter, co-writer
- Fragile History of Ceramics: Handmade in Britain (2011) – expert
- The Antiques Roadshow (1986–2024) – expert
- The Real Collector's Guide (1995) – presenter (Channel One, London)
- Antiques Inspectors (1997, 1999) – expert
- Inside Antiques (2004) – presenter
- Castle in the Country (2004–2008) – expert

=== Radio ===
- Hidden Treasures (1998–2002) – chairman/ co-writer
- Out of the Fire (2000) – presenter
- For What It's Worth (2002–2006) – presenter
- Archive Hour (Radio 4): Men in Bow Ties (2007) – presenter
- On the China Trail (2007) – presenter
- Earth to Earth: Potted Immortality (2009) – presenter
- Twenty Minutes: There's Something About the Cello (2011) – presenter
- A journey around Hans Christian Andersen (2005 – co-presenter with Michael Rosen)

== Publications ==
- The Little, Brown Illustrated Encyclopaedia of Antiques (ed. with Paul Atterbury), 1994
- Hogarth's China: Hogarth's Paintings and Eighteenth-century Ceramics, 1997
- Reader's Digest: Treasures in Your Home (with David Battie)
- How to Spot a Fake, 1999
- A-Z of 20th Century Antiques (ed.), 2000
- ‘’Hogarth and Europe’’(Tate 2021-2022 exhibition catalogue, contributor) 2021
