= Geoffrey Munn =

British jewellery specialist

Geoffrey Munn OBE, MVO, FSA, FLS
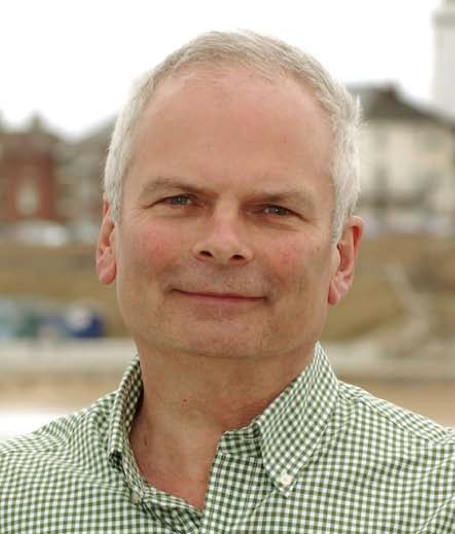
- Munn in 2013
- Born: 11 April 1953 (age 73); Hastings, Sussex, United Kingdom
- Occupations: Antiques expert, television presenter, author.
- Employer(s): Wartski, BBC
- Television: Antiques Roadshow
- Spouse: Caroline (m. 1983)
- Children: 2
- Awards: OBE, MVO

Geoffrey Charles Munn (born 11 April 1953 in Hastings, East Sussex) is a British jewellery specialist, television presenter and writer. He is best known as one of the specialists on the BBC's Antiques Roadshow.

== Career ==
Munn during a damp Antiques Roadshow, 2013

Munn's first television appearance was in 1963 when he, and his brother, Roger Munn, featured with their pet fox cubs on Johnny Morris's Animal Magic. He was brought up in Henfield in Sussex and educated at Shoreham College and Steyning Grammar School.

Munn became the managing director of London jewellers Wartski, where he had worked since the age of 19; his specialisation is jewellery, especially that of Fortunato Pio Castellani, Carlo Giuliano and Peter Carl Fabergé. Wartski are jewellers by appointment to Charles III, having also served for Elizabeth II. The firm made the Welsh gold wedding rings for the Prince of Wales and Camilla Parker Bowles, and Catherine Middleton when she married Prince William in 2011.

Munn has a keen interest in every aspect of history and has a collection of ancient flint tools he has found in the Southwold area of Suffolk. He has appeared in several television sequences of "mudlarking" in the Thames at Westminster. Munn is fascinated by both literature and art and has written a number of books, including Southwold, an Earthly Paradise, a pictorial history of his home town. He has written on the work of D G Rossetti, Edward Lear, J. M. W. Turner and Richard Dadd. Geoffrey Munn is a trustee of the Bethlem Museum of the Mind. In July 2015, he conducted the first in a series called Tate Britain BP Walks Through British Art in which there was an emphasis on jewellery and botanical decoration from the Renaissance to the present day.

Munn has curated many exhibitions, including Tiaras at the Victoria and Albert Museum in 2002. On 10 January 1991, he was elected Fellow of the Society of Antiquaries of London (FSA). He is also a fellow the Linnean Society of London and The Royal Society of Arts. Munn is a Freeman of the City of London and was Fourth Warden of the Worshipful Company of Goldsmiths. He is also a member of the Garrick Club, the Brydges Place Club and the Sailor's Reading Room, Southwold.

In the 2013 New Years Honours, Munn was appointed Officer of the Order of the British Empire (OBE) for services to charity in the United Kingdom. In 2016, he was appointed Chairman of the Friends of The British Antique Dealers' Association Trust. In the 2018 New Year Honours, he was made a Member of the Royal Victorian Order (MVO) by Queen Elizabeth II.

== Personal life ==
Munn was born in Hastings, East Sussex in April 1953. He married Caroline in 1983 and the couple have two sons. The couple live near Southwold in Suffolk.

In Who's Who he lists his recreations as "mudlarking", metal detecting, Bonsai, cooking, museums and art galleries. He played himself in the Stephen Poliakoff film Joe's Palace.

Munn is also an Ambassador for the Samaritans and patron of the Lowestoft branch; he ran the Flora London Marathon for the charity raising £80,000 in sponsorship. He has been an ambassador for the charity Pancreatic Cancer UK and patron of The Brain Tumour Charity, the Royal Osteoporosis Society and Sotterley Chapel Preservation Trust.

== Bibliography ==
- Castellani and Giuliano: Revivalist Jewellers of the Nineteenth Century (1984) Trefoil Publications ISBN 978-0862940447
- The Triumph of Love: Jewelry, 1530-1930 (1993) ASIN B01K0T0I0M
- Pre-raphaelite to Arts and Crafts: Jewellery (1999) ACC Art Books ISBN 978-1851492572
- Tiaras: Past and Present Hardcover (2002) V&A Publications ISBN 978-1851773596
- Wartski: The First Hundred and Fifty Years (2015) ACC Art Books ASIN B01BJ5E3X4
- Southwold: An Earthly Paradise (2017) ISBN 978-1788841979
- Tiaras: A History of Splendour 1800-2000 (2022) ACC Art Books ASIN B01K0S8V0M
- A Touch of Gold: The Reminiscences of Geoffrey Munn (2023) ACC Art Books ISBN 978-1788841979
