= Dendy Easton =

Dendy Peter Nicholas Napper Easton (born December 1950) is a fine art consultant for Bonhams, better known as one of the experts on the BBC programme, Antiques Roadshow. The son of Dendy Bryan Easton (1916–2001) and his wife Iris (née Keyser), he began his career in fine art in 1971. He spent 30 years at Sotheby's, finishing as a director who specialised in 19th and 20th-century pictures.
