= Antiques Roadshow =

British TV series

- Title logo
- Genre: Antiques show
- Created by: BBC Studios
- Presented by: Bruce Parker (1979); Angela Rippon (1979); Arthur Negus (1979–1983); Hugh Scully (1981–2000); Michael Aspel (2000–2008); Fiona Bruce (2008–present)
- Theme music composer: Paul Reade; Tim Gibson
- Country of origin: United Kingdom
- Original language: English
- No. of series: 49
- No. of episodes: 866 (list of episodes)

Production
- Running time: 60 minutes
- Production company: BBC Studios Factual Entertainment Productions

Original release
- Network: BBC One
- Release: 18 February 1979 – present

Antiques Roadshow is a British reality show television programme broadcast by the BBC in which antiques appraisers travel to various regions of the United Kingdom (and occasionally to other countries) to appraise antiques mostly brought in by local people. It has been running since 1979, based on a 1977 documentary programme.

The series has spawned many international versions throughout Europe, North America and other countries with the same TV format. The programme is hosted by Fiona Bruce and in 2026 was in its 49th series.

== History ==
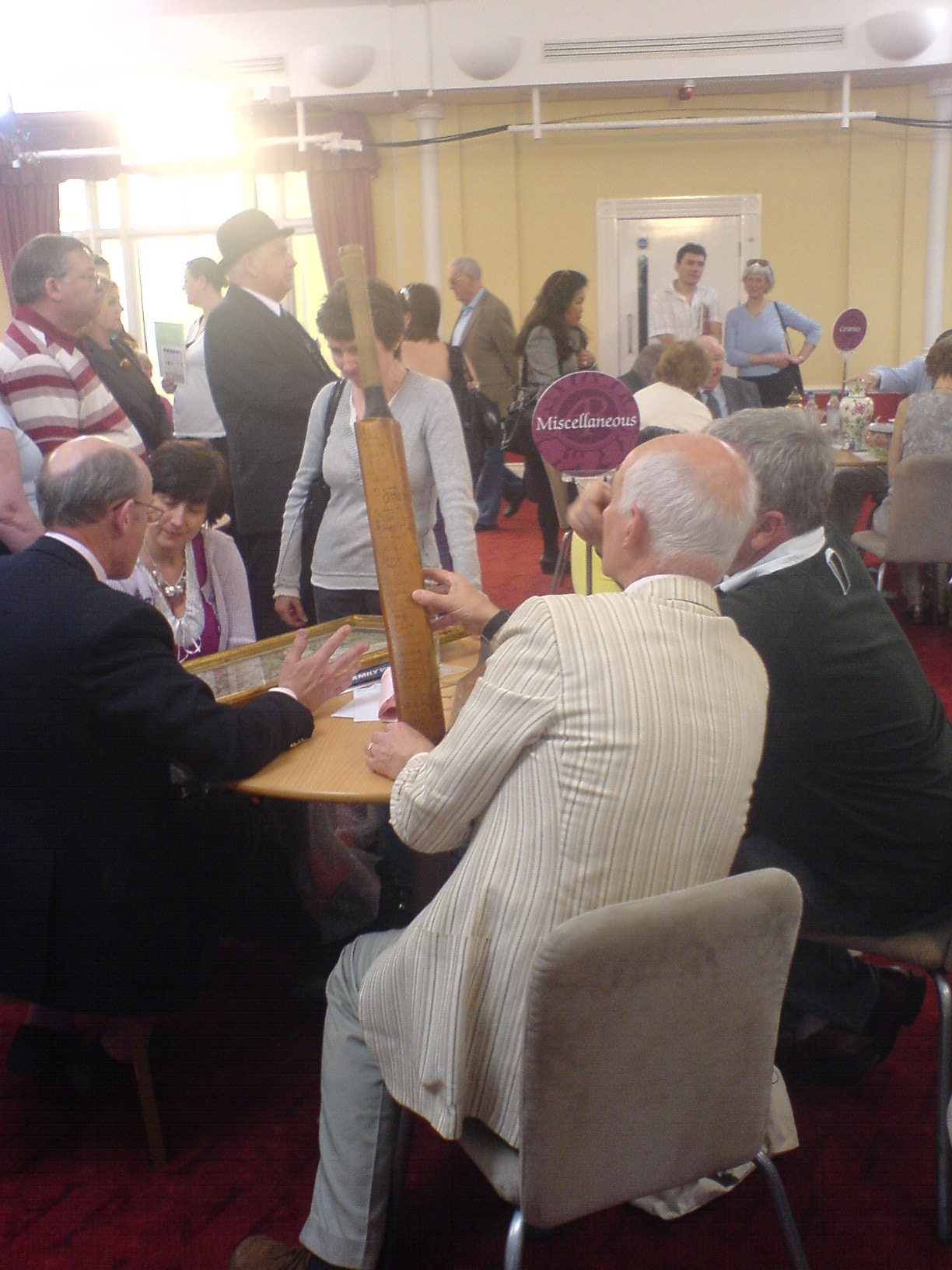
Paul Atterbury examines an antique cricket bat, 2008

The programme began as a BBC documentary that aired in 1977, about a London auction house doing a tour of the West Country in England. The pilot roadshow was recorded in Hereford on 17 May 1977 and presented by contributor Bruce Parker, a presenter of the news/current affairs programme Nationwide, and antiques expert Arthur Negus, who had previously worked on a similarly themed show, called Going for a Song. The pilot was so successful that it was transmitted.

The show has been running since 1979 and the format has remained almost unchanged over the decades, but also endeavours to reflect changes in the nature of the markets and collecting, by featuring 20th century items such as Barbie Dolls, modern ceramics, and Star Wars and other film memorabilia. Negus appeared on Antiques Roadshow until 1983. In the original BBC programme, various towns or famous places are advertised as venues. The show has since visited a number of other countries (including Canada in 2001 and Australia in 2005) and has been imitated by other TV production companies around the world.

In the United Kingdom, annual children's Christmas specials aired from 1991 until 2006, under the title Antiques Roadshow: The Next Generation (except for the 1991 edition, which was titled Antiques Roadshow Going Live) and used a specially reworked version of the regular theme music. However, there was no children's special in 2007; instead an edition was devoted to "antiques of the future" dating from the 1950s to the present day. Since then individually themed specials have been aired, though not every year.

A spin-off programme, 20th Century Roadshow, focusing on modern collectibles, aired between April and June 2005. It was hosted by Alan Titchmarsh. Two other spin-off programmes, Antiques Roadshow Gems (1991) and Priceless Antiques Roadshow (2009–10), revisited items from the show's history and provided background information on the making of the show and interviews with the programme's experts.

=== Valuable and worthless items ===
Among the most valuable items ever to appear on the show were an FA Cup trophy valued at over £1 million and two other items each valued at £1 million:

- An original 1990s maquette of the Angel of the North sculpture by Antony Gormley, owned by Gateshead Council, featured on 16 November 2008 and valued by Philip Mould
- A Fabergé ornament, the property of an army unit, valued by Geoffrey Munn, filmed in 2017 and broadcast on 15 April 2018.

Glassware expert Andy McConnell valued a collection of chandeliers at £7 million (their actual insurance value), noting as he did so that this beat Mould's record; however, these were fixtures of the building in which the show was being filmed (Bath Assembly Rooms) rather than an item that had been brought in.

The two most expensive objects to be actually sold, not merely valued, as a result of being discovered on the show are a 1932 camera found by Marc Allum, which realised over $600,000 (US) in 2013, and a Christofle et Cie Japonisme jardiniere filmed by Eric Knowles, which sold for £668,450 (including buyer's premium). A vase purchased at a car boot sale for £1 was identified in a 2008 show as by Lalique and sold at auction for £32,450.

Conversely, many items brought before the experts are without commercial value. Sometimes, an opportunity may be taken to explain the difference between real and fake items, but not at the expense of the owner's reputation. Value is not the only criterion for inclusion: items with an interesting story attached, or of a provenance relevant to the show's location, will often be featured regardless of value. Items directly related to The Holocaust may have their stories featured, but are not given valuations. An episode commemorating the end of the First World War and featuring personal mementoes, included no valuations. All items are appraised, although most appraisals take place off-camera, with only the most promising items (around 50 on an average day) being filmed, of which about 20 appear in the final programme.

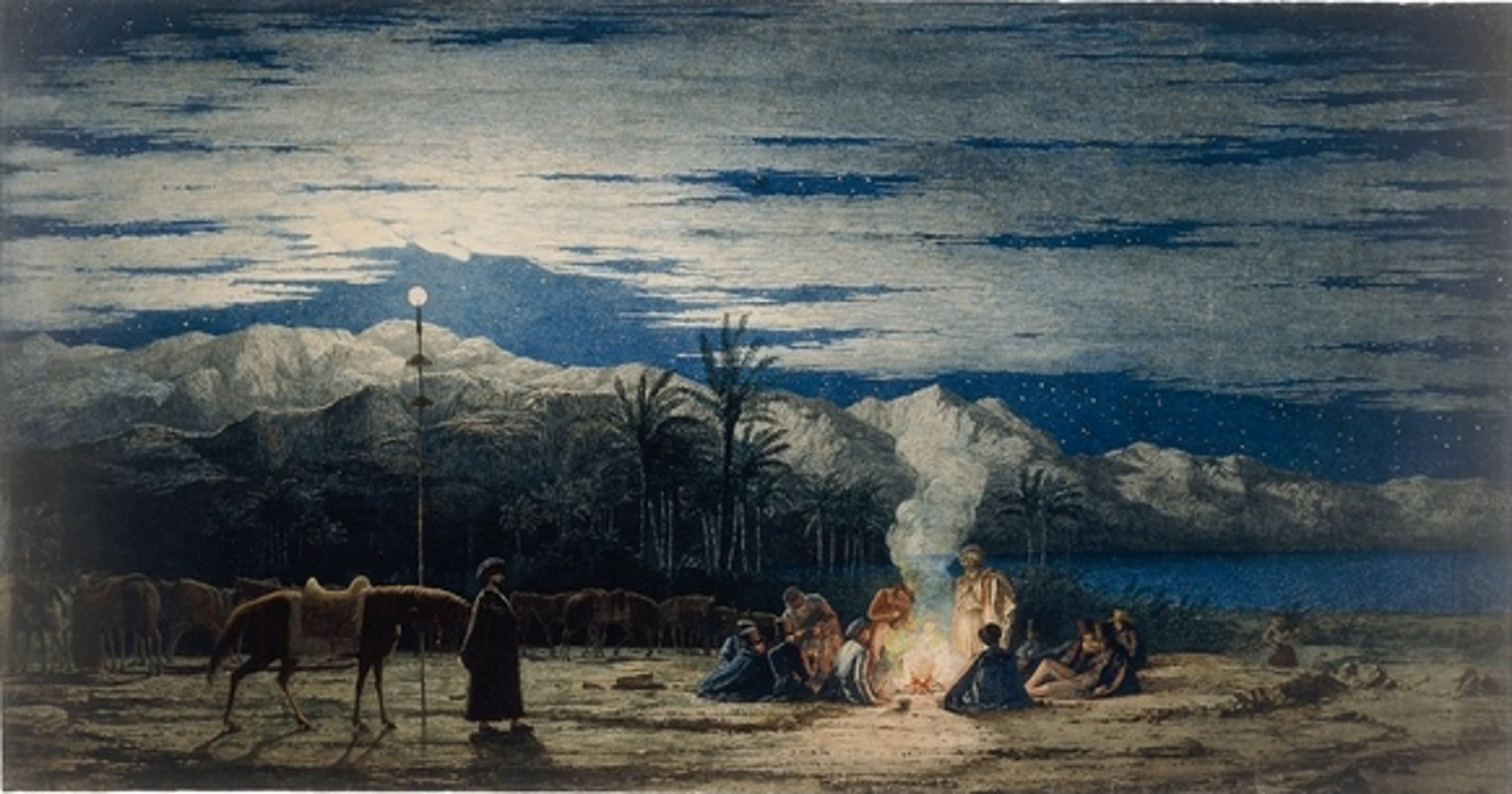
The Artist's Halt in the Desert by Moonlight, watercolour, by Richard Dadd

Some significant items have been acquired by museums after being sold once their owners were appraised of their true value. An example is the watercolour painting The Artist's Halt in the Desert by Richard Dadd, discovered and shown by Peter Nahum in 1986 and purchased the next year by the British Museum for £100,000. Another such item, later dubbed "Ozzy the Owl", is a Staffordshire slipware jug, valued by Henry Sandon on a 1990 show at £20,000 to £30,000, and subsequently acquired by Potteries Museum & Art Gallery.

The original theme music was part of Bach's Brandenburg Concerto No. 3 (for several years in a Moog synthesiser version by Wendy Carlos), but this was replaced in the early 1990s by an original piece. This theme was written by Paul Reade and Tim Gibson and published by Air Edel.

In March 2023, in an edition from the Eden Project in Cornwall, the guest was Queen Camilla.

== Format ==
Visitors (predominantly from the area being visited by the show) bring along their possessions to be evaluated for authenticity and interest (especially related to the venue) and an approximate valuation is given. The production team selects the items whose appraisal is to be televised. Often, the professional evaluators give a rather in-depth historical, craft, or artistic context to the item, adding a very strong cultural element to the show. This increases the show's appeal to people interested in the study of the past or some particular crafts, or certain arts, regardless of the monetary value of the objects. At the core, however, the focus of the production is on the interplay between the owner and the evaluator.

== Presenters ==
Antiques Roadshow has been hosted by:

- Bruce Parker (1979)
- Angela Rippon (1979)
- Arthur Negus (1979–1983)
- Hugh Scully (1981–2000)
- Michael Aspel (2000–2007)
- Fiona Bruce (since 2008)

== Programme experts for 2021/2022 ==
Antiques Roadshow has a team of experts numbering over sixty. Many have areas of speciality, and some of them have a long standing on the programme.

=== Arms and militaria ===
- Bill Harriman
- Runjeet Singh
- Mark Smith
- Robert Tilney

=== Books and manuscripts ===
- Justin Croft
- Clive Farahar
- Matthew Haley
- Rupert Powell
- Fuchsia Voremberg

=== Ceramics and glass ===
- Alexandra Aguilar
- Serhat Ahmet
- Rosa Assennato
- John Axford
- David Battie (he retired in 2021, after 43 years on the show)
- Theo Burrell
- Will Farmer
- Andy McConnell
- Steven Moore
- Henry Sandon
- John Sandon
- Lars Tharp

=== Clocks and watches ===
- Alastair Chandler
- Richard Price
- Ben Wright

=== Furniture ===
- Lennox Cato
- Christopher Payne
- John Bly

=== Jewellery ===
- John Benjamin
- Kate Flitcroft
- Joanna Hardy
- Geoffrey Munn
- Susan Rumfitt
- Siobhan Tyrrell

=== Miscellaneous ===
- Marc Allum
- George Archdale
- Ronnie Archer-Morgan
- Paul Atterbury
- Jon Baddeley
- Cristian Beadman
- Elaine Binning
- Bunny Campione
- Wayne Colquhoun
- John Foster
- Fergus Gambon
- Sally Hoban
- Mark Hill
- Amin Jaffer
- Hilary Kay
- Eric Knowles
- Lisa Lloyd
- Judith Miller
- Adam Schoon
- Philip Taubenheim
- Jennifer Welch
- Chris Yeo
- Lee Young

=== Pictures and prints ===
- Frances Christie
- Dendy Easton
- Grant Ford
- Alexandra Gill
- Lawrence Hendra
- Rupert Maas
- Philip Mould
- Charlotte Riordan
- Suzanne Zack

=== Silver ===
- Duncan Campbell
- Alastair Dickenson
- Gordon Foster
- Ian Pickford

== Locations ==
=== Episodes ===
Episodes are usually filmed during the spring and summer and aired the following autumn and winter (into the following year). Each location visited is covered by one or two (exceptionally even three) episodes.

== International versions ==
=== Australia ===
In 2005, part of the BBC team visited Australia and produced six one-hour episodes in conjunction with The LifeStyle Channel (XYZnetworks). These were titled Antiques Roadshow Australia. A special was also made about the visit to Australia, entitled Antiques Roadshow Australia: Behind the Scenes.

=== Belgium ===
In Flanders, VTM broadcast a local version for 7 seasons starting in 2012, called Rijker dan je denkt? (Richer than you thought?). It was hosted by Staf Coppens.

=== Canada ===
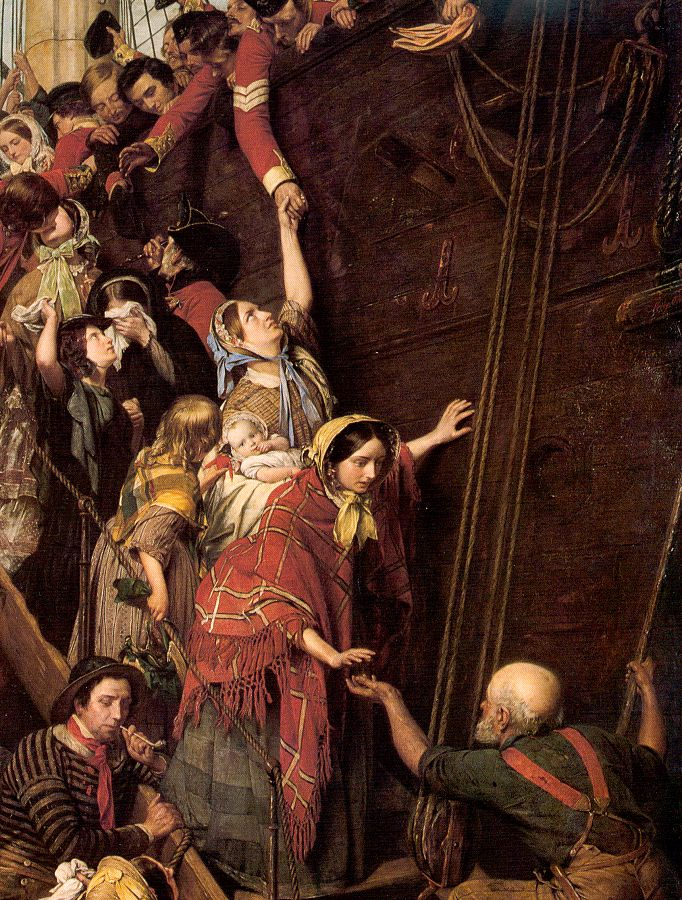
Eastward Ho! (1857) by Henry Nelson O'Neil was appraised on Canadian Antiques Roadshow.

In Canada, Canadian Antiques Roadshow – a programme based on the British and American versions – debuted in January 2005 on CBC Television and CBC Newsworld and ran until 2009. The show has also been aired on CBC Country Canada. It was hosted by Valerie Pringle.

The most expensive item featured was Henry Nelson O'Neil's "Eastward Ho!" oil on canvas. Recommended insurance: CDN$500,000, later sold at Sotheby's in London for £164,800 (about CDN$300,000 at the 2008 exchange rate).

=== Finland ===
The Finnish version, known as Antiikkia, antiikkia (Antiques, antiques), ran on YLE TV1 between 1997 and 2006.

=== Germany ===
In Germany, various versions are broadcast regularly on the public regional channels of the ARD, the oldest being the BR production Kunst und Krempel (Art and Junk), airing since 1985. Other versions include Lieb & teuer (Near & dear), shown on NDR, Kitsch oder Kunst? (Kitsch or Art?), shown on HR, Echt Antik?! (Genuinely antique?!), shown on SWR, and Bares für Rares on ZDF.

=== Netherlands ===
The show Tussen Kunst & Kitsch (Between Art & Kitsch) has been running in the Netherlands since 1984. First shown on AVRO, the programme is usually set in a museum somewhere in the Netherlands, sometimes in Belgium and Germany. Due to its popularity, special episodes have been made in which the experts take the viewers on "cultural art excursions" to places of great importance in the history of art.

In 2011, a painting of Joost van Geel with the title Het Kantwerkstertje (The Little Lacemaker) was discovered with an estimated value of 250,000 euros, the highest-appraised item on the show. The programme has been presented by Cees van Drongelen (1984–2002), Nelleke van der Krogt (2002–2015), and Frits Sissing (since 2015), and it celebrated its 40th series in 2024.

=== Sweden ===
The Swedish version started out as a co-production between SVT Malmö and the BBC, whose Antiques Roadshow visited Scandinavia for two programmes. Antikrundan (Antiques Round), its Swedish version, premiered in August 1989 on TV2.

As of 2019, most of the experts have been with the programme since its start. Jesper Aspegren was the original host. He left in 2000, and from the 2001 season onwards, Antikrundan has been hosted by Anne Lundberg. The 37th season was concluded early 2026, with Lundberg hosting for the 27th year.(in Swedish)

The BBC original is also run on Swedish television, under the name Engelska Antikrundan ("English Antiques Round").

=== United States ===
American public broadcaster PBS created a show in 1997 inspired by the Antiques Roadshow. The American version of Antiques Roadshow is produced by WGBH, a PBS member station in Boston, Massachusetts. Marsha Bemko is executive producer and the hosts have been Chris Jussel, Dan Elias, Lara Spencer and Mark Walberg. In 2018, the show dropped having an on-camera host, instead having Walberg be an off-camera narrator. Walberg left the show after Season 23 aired in 2019, and was replaced by Coral Peña.

PBS also airs the original BBC programme, though it is called Antiques Roadshow UK to differentiate it from the PBS version. Values of items in United States dollars are often superimposed over the pound sterling values given in the original broadcast.

== Related shows ==
=== Overseas specials ===
Hugh Scully hosted a Beaulieu (Alberta) based show on 3 January 1993, a Jamaican based show on 14 February 1993, a Cork based show on 13 February 1994 and a Brussels based show on 16 April 1995, all on the BBC.

=== Antiques Roadshow Detectives ===
Fiona Bruce together with individual Antiques Roadshow appraisers investigate the history of significant items, uncovering the stories that form the history of family heirlooms and finding out about their origin and authenticity.

==== Broadcasts ====
This one-season programme was broadcast in 2015 and comprises 15 episodes.

In Sweden it was shown on SVT in Autumn 2018 under the name of Engelska Antikrundan: Arvegodsens hemligheter ("English Round of Antiques: The Secrets of the Heirlooms").

==== Reception ====
Ellen E Jones of The Independent called the first episode, about a Cromwellian escutcheon, "a welcome addition to the schedules".

== Literature ==
=== Magazines ===
The BBC published a monthly Homes & Antiques magazine until 2011, which offered behind-the-scenes insights into Antiques Roadshow, as well as offering tips and advice on buying and evaluating antiques. This magazine still exists, now published by Immediate since 2015.

There is also a spin-off magazine of the American version of the show called Antiques Roadshow Insider, which gives fans an inside look at the show as well as offering special features about antiques and collectibles from the programme itself.

=== Further reading ===
- Roadshow experts (2000). Lars Tharp (ed.). BBC Antiques Roadshow: A–Z of 20th Century Antiques. Michael Aspel (foreword). Boxtree Ltd. p. 252. ISBN 0-7522-1790-9.
- Hugh Scully; Fiona Malcolm; Paul Atterbury (1998). Antiques Roadshow: A Celebration of the First 21 Years. Mitchell Beazley. p. 152. ISBN 1-84000-072-4.
- Antiques Roadshow: Experts on Objects. Edited by Christopher Lewis. Authors include Eric Knowles, David Battie, John Bly and Anthony J Lester. BBC Books, 1987. p. 192. ISBN 0-5632-0628-4.

== See also ==
- Bargain Hunt (2000–present)
- Cash in the Attic (2002–2012)
- Flog It! (2002–2020)
- Dickinson's Real Deal (2006–2024)
- Antiques Road Trip (2010–present)
- Fake or Fortune? (2011–present)
