= Eric Knowles =

Antique expert and television personality

Eric Knowles FRSA
- Knowles in 2010
- Born: 19 February 1953 (age 73); Nelson, Lancashire, England
- Occupations: Antiquarian; Television personality Sausage Ambassador
- Television: Antiques Roadshow; Restoration Roadshow; Bargain Hunt
- Website: ericknowles.co.uk scottishantiques.com

Eric Knowles FRSA (born 19 February 1953 in Nelson, Lancashire, England) is a British antiquarian and television personality, whose main interests are in ceramics and glass.

== Early life ==
Knowles went to Nelson Secondary Technical School.

He then joined the London auction house Bonhams as a porter in the ceramics department in 1976 and became head of the department in 1981. By 1992 he had set up Bonham's offices in Bristol. He returned to London to continue with directing the Decorative Arts Department. He was appointed non-executive director of scottishantiques.com (The Hoard Limited) a "decorative art and design emporium" in the Corn Exchange in The Pantiles in Royal Tunbridge Wells in July 2021. He retired in November 2023.

== Television career ==
He first earned fame as a ceramics expert on the BBC's Antiques Roadshow. He has also appeared in such programmes as, Going for a Song, Going, Going, Gone, Noel's House Party, Call My Bluff and 20th Century Roadshow. He presented the 20 episodes of Restoration Roadshow on BBC for several weeks in the summer of 2010 (ending 3 September). He was the challenge setter and adjudicator on BBC Two's Antiques Master assisting host Sandi Toksvig. From 2008 to 2010, he appeared on the UK TV show Put Your Money Where Your Mouth Is. After Tim Wonnacott left Bargain Hunt, Knowles became one of a number of 'guest presenters' hosting the show. He also appeared in the series Clash of the Collectables, which he co-hosted with Alan Carter.

== Personal life ==
Knowles is a Fellow of the Royal Society of Arts and an Ambassador for the King's Trust, originally known as the Prince's Trust. Knowles is associated with several other charities including Headway, FABLE (For a better life with epilepsy), the New Mozart Orchestra and Wycombe Scanappeal. He has lectured at the Victoria & Albert Museum, the British Museum, and national museums in Australia, Canada, the US, South Africa, France, Germany, and the Czech Republic.

Knowles had the Freedom of the City of London bestowed in 2000.

He is a published author on subjects such as Victoriana, Royal memorabilia, Art Nouveau, Art Deco, and René Lalique.

Eric was also the Sausage Ambassador for the United Kingdom in 2017.

His son Seb was killed in a road accident in May 2015.
