= Hilary Kay =

British antique expert

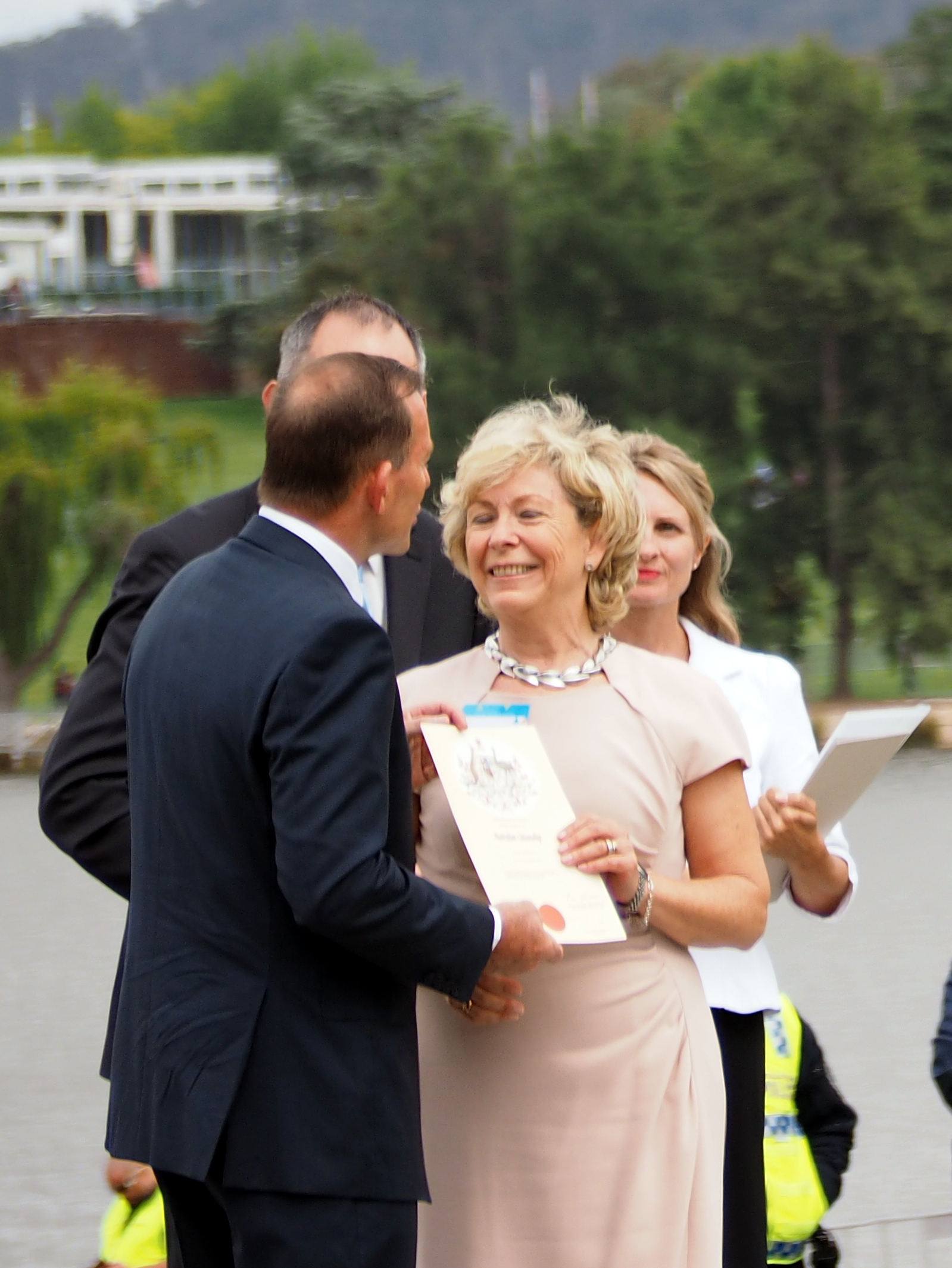
- Hilary Kay receiving her Australian citizenship certificate from Tony Abbott January 2015
- Born: 16 December 1956 (age 69)
- Occupations: Antiques expert, television presenter, author, lecturer, President, The Arts Society
- Television: Antiques Roadshow

Hilary Marion Kay (born 16 December 1956) is a British antiques expert, author and lecturer, probably best known for her many appearances on the BBC programme Antiques Roadshow on which she is now the longest serving member of the team of experts. In 2025 Kay became President of The Arts Society, a leading arts education charity.

== Biography ==
Kay's first job was working for fine art and antique dealers Spink & Son in St. James's. In 1977, Kay accepted an offer to join Sotheby's Collectors’ Department. Later that year Kay became head of that department and, aged 21, became the company's youngest ever auctioneer. A rock and roll fan, in 1981 Kay held the world's first rock and roll memorabilia auction, handled the sale of Elton John's collection in 1988 and in 1992 wrote Rock ’n’ Roll Collectables: An Illustrated History of Rock Memorabilia, the first textbook on the subject.

As well as working on television as an expert on Antiques Roadshow from 1979 onwards, Kay presented a landmark series for BBC One, Brilliantly British, which explored the lives of Thomas Chippendale, Josiah Wedgwood and William Morris. Kay has written or contributed to a number of books on the subject of antiques and collectables and has appeared in numerous television and radio programmes.

Kay is a fan of mechanical antiques, having been born into a family of Engineers. She is also a car enthusiast; one of her early influences was the James Bond film Goldfinger, where she loved the Aston Martin DB5. In 2009, for a special episode of BBC TV's Priceless Antiques Roadshow, Kay was behind the wheel of the Aston Martin DB5 driven by Daniel Craig in Casino Royale.

Kay, by then a Senior Director, left Sotheby's in 1999. She now runs Art & Antique Events, a corporate entertainment company which provides antiques-based events and entertainments to corporate and private clients. She created and produces a stage show with fellow Antiques Roadshow expert Paul Atterbury called 'Have You Had it Long Madam?' (Tales from the Roadshow), which has toured the UK, Australia, Canada and New Zealand.

On 27 December 2010 Kay won an edition of BBC One's Celebrity Mastermind, with a score of 36 points, having chosen 'The Life and Works of Josiah Wedgwood' as her specialist subject.

Currently Kay presents and curates the online art appreciation course, The Art Institute, operating in the United Kingdom, Australia, New Zealand, South Africa, Canada and Ireland.

== Personal life ==
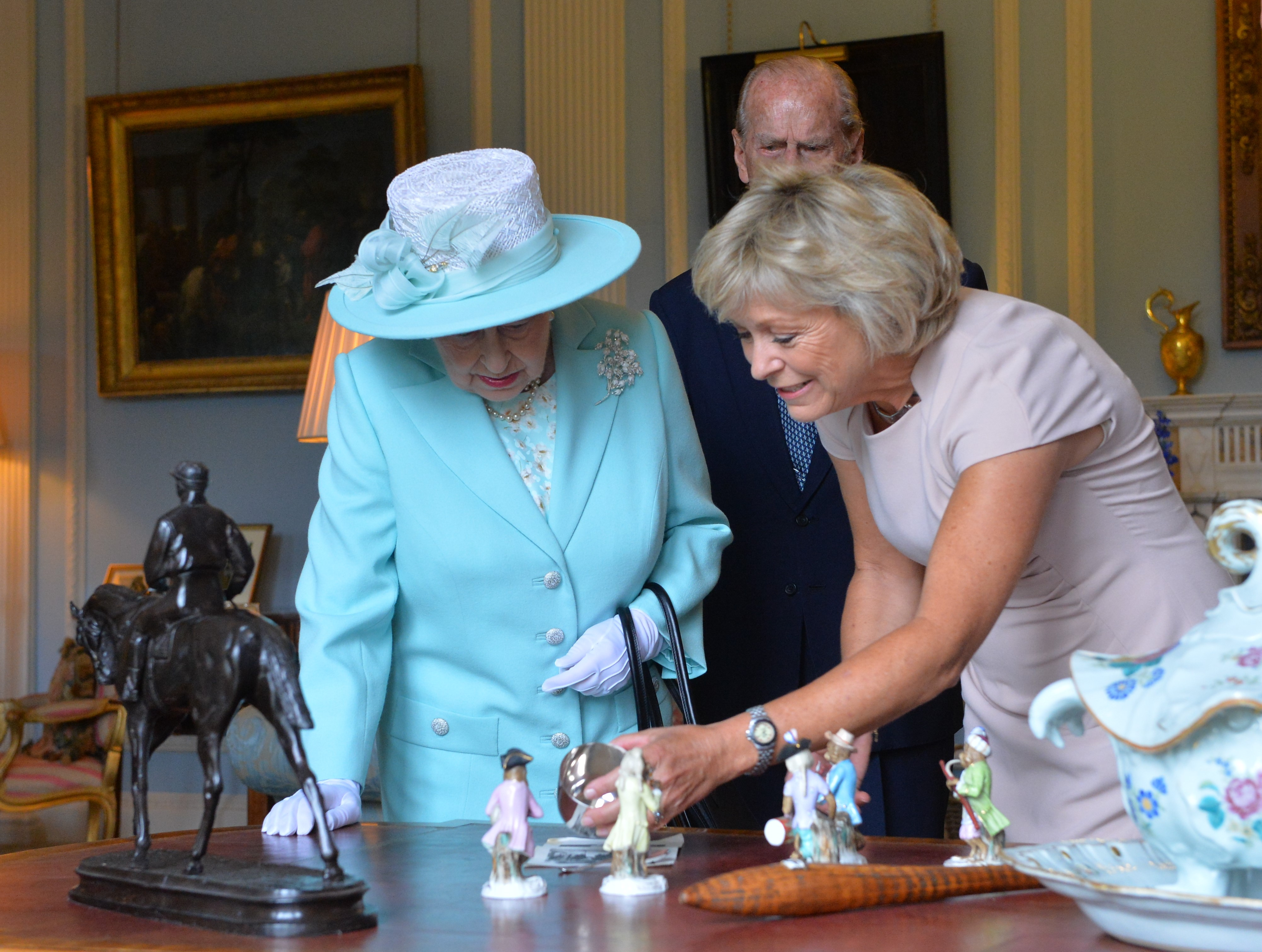
Kay discusses objects with Her Majesty Queen Elizabeth and Prince Philip during a private Antiques Roadshow, Hillsborough Castle, Northern Ireland 2014

Kay has joint British and Australian citizenship.
