= Michael Aspel =

English television presenter and newsreader (born 1933)

Michael Aspel OBE
- Born: Michael Terence Aspel; 12 January 1933 (age 93); Battersea, London, England
- Education: Emanuel School
- Occupations: Television and radio presenter; journalist
- Years active: 1957–2008; 2023–2024
- Spouses: Dian Sessions (m. 1957; div. 1961) Ann Reed (m. 1962; div. 1967) Elizabeth Power (m. 1977; sep. 1994)
- Partner: Irene Clarke (1994–present)
- Children: 7

Michael Terence Aspel (born 12 January 1933) is an English retired television presenter and newsreader. He hosted programmes such as Crackerjack!, Ask Aspel, Aspel & Company, Give Us a Clue, This Is Your Life, Strange but True? and Antiques Roadshow.

== Early life and education ==
Michael Terence Aspel was born on 12 January 1933 in Battersea in London. During the Second World War, he was evacuated from the area and spent nearly five years in Chard, Somerset. He attended Emanuel School after passing his eleven-plus in 1944 and served as a conscript during his national service, in the ranks of the King's Royal Rifle Corps, from 1951 to 1953.

== Career ==
Aspel worked as a drainpipe-layer and gardener and sold advertising space for the Western Mail newspaper in Cardiff. He worked as a teaboy at William Collins publishers in London and then entered National Service. He took up a job at the David Morgan department store in Cardiff until 1955, before working as newsreader for the BBC in Cardiff in 1957. He also acted in Cardiff, in a BBC Children's Hour serial Counterspy, produced by BBC Wales and written by and starring John Darran. Aspel played "Rocky" Mountain, a Canadian. By the early sixties, he had become one of four regular newsreaders on BBC national television, along with Richard Baker, Robert Dougall and Corbet Woodall.

At the BBC, Aspel began presenting a number of other programmes such as the series Come Dancing, Crackerjack! and Ask Aspel, as well as the Miss World beauty contest which he covered 14 times. He narrated the BREMA cartoon documentary, The Colour Television Receiver (aka Degaussing or The Colour Receiver Installation Film), which was shown every day (except Sunday) on BBC2 between 14 October 1967 and 8 January 1971. He also provided narration for the BBC nuclear war drama documentary The War Game, which won the Best Documentary Feature Oscar in 1966 but was not shown on British television until 1985.

Aspel was a studio announcer at the BBC on 14 February 1969 during a live broadcast from the Dorchester Hotel of an awards ceremony, when the host, Kenneth Horne, died of a heart attack. Aspel filled in unscripted until the show resumed. He was later quoted as saying: "I got round this in a suitably dignified way. But it was awful as Kenneth Horne was not only a great performer, but such a wonderful man."

In both 1969 and 1976, Aspel hosted the BBC's A Song for Europe contest to choose Britain's Eurovision entry and provided the UK TV commentary twice at the Eurovision Song Contest in the same years, 1969 and 1976, in which year he also presented the contest previews.

He also had a regular joke slot on the Kenny Everett radio show on Capital Radio and guest-starred twice on The Goodies, appearing as himself, including in the episode "Kitten Kong", which won the Silver Rose at the Montreux Light Entertainment Festival.

From 2 September 1974 until 27 July 1984, Aspel also presented a three-hour weekday, mid-morning music and chat programme on Capital Radio in London. He then presented a Sunday show on Capital (which only lasted for a few months, ending on 30 December 1984) before moving to LBC for the remainder of the decade. He also presented weekend shows on BBC Radio 2 in the late 1980s and again in the 1990s.

In 1977, Aspel appeared with a number of other newsreaders and presenters, dressed as sailors, in a song-and-dance routine ("There is Nothing Like a Dame") on The Morecambe and Wise Show. In another episode, Morecambe refers to him as "Michael Aspirin" (a name also used by 'Disc' music magazine when Aspel was at Capital Radio). In the 1970s and 1980s Aspel presented popular ITV programmes such as Give Us a Clue, Child's Play and The 6 O'Clock Show, a live current affairs and entertainment programme shown only in the London Weekend Television region. In 1989, he hosted a televised interactive murder mystery set at a wedding called Murder Weekend, devised and written by Joy Swift, which invited viewers to solve a whodunnit to win a prize.

During the early 1990s, Aspel presented two documentaries on BBC Radio 2 written by Terence Pettigrew, on subjects of which he and Pettigrew had personal knowledge. Caught in the Draft was a nostalgic look back at compulsory national service. Both had served, at different times, in West Germany, Aspel in the Kings Royal Rifle Corps and Pettigrew in the REME. Also taking part in the programme were comedian/compere Bob Monkhouse, Leslie Thomas, author of The Virgin Soldiers, and BBC Radio 2 drivetime host John Dunn. This was followed by Nobody Cried When The Trains Pulled Out, a documentary about the evacuation of children from major British cities during World War 2 that included champion boxer Henry Cooper, actor Derek Nimmo and author Ben Wicks.

Aspel was the host of the chat show Aspel & Company, which ran from 9 June 1984 to 20 June 1993 on ITV. The show was successful in attracting high-profile guests including then-Prime Minister Margaret Thatcher and George Harrison with Ringo Starr. In 1993, Aspel & Company was censured by the Independent Television Commission because of an interview with Arnold Schwarzenegger, Bruce Willis and Sylvester Stallone who were promoting their joint business venture Planet Hollywood. For a time, Aspel & Company performed well for ITV in the highly competitive Saturday night ratings but after the Planet Hollywood controversy, Aspel vowed never to host a chat show again.

Aspel was featured on This Is Your Life in 1980. When host Eamonn Andrews died in 1987, he became presenter of the programme until its run ended in 2003. In 1993, Aspel began presenting the ITV supernatural programme Strange but True?, a series exploring supernatural phenomena and unexplained mysteries. The programme ran between 1993 and 1997. He presented a new version of the ITV game show Blockbusters for the BBC in 1997; Aspel presented 60 episodes in total. In 1993, Aspel became an Officer of the Order of the British Empire (OBE) "for services to broadcasting". He has been voted TV Times and Variety Club Television Personality of the Year. He was also voted into the Royal Television Society Hall of Fame for outstanding services to television.

Aspel also hosted all three editions of the ITV Telethon, in 1988, 1990 and 1992.

Aspel presented BBC's Antiques Roadshow from 2000 until 2008; his last programme (recorded at Kentwell Hall, Suffolk) was shown on 30 March 2008, being a tribute to himself. In 2003, Aspel starred in a BBC Three spoof documentary, Sex, Lies & Michael Aspel, which claimed he had affairs with Pamela Anderson, Valerie Singleton and Angie Best, among others. Aspel guest hosted the topical quiz show Have I Got News for You on two occasions (October 2005 and November 2007).

In 2006, he played the role of the narrator in the UK tour of Richard O'Brien's The Rocky Horror Show. During July and August 2008, Aspel filmed Evacuees Reunited, a five-part documentary series made by Leopard Films for ITV1, which aired from 15 to 19 December 2008. Along with 15 other wartime evacuees, he returned to the locations of his own youth, including his wartime home in Chard, Somerset. He was reunited with his childhood gang of evacuees at Forde Abbey, just outside the town. Later he caught up with his 96-year-old former school teacher, Audrey Guppy.

In 2025, he appeared in an introductory feature for a BBC Four screening of The War Game.

== Personal life ==
Aspel has been married three times and had seven children, including one who died at three days. He married Dian Sessions in 1957. They had two sons; one son died aged 29 of cancer. The couple divorced in 1961. Aspel married Anne Reed, a TV scriptwriter, in 1962 and they had twin children, one son and one daughter, before divorcing in 1967. In 1977, Aspel married actress Elizabeth Power, later best known for her role as Christine Hewitt in EastEnders. The couple had two sons; a third died at three days old, and a fourth was stillborn.

He left her in 1994 for a production assistant on This Is Your Life, Irene Clarke, and they are still together, as of 2026. They live in Weybridge, Surrey.

As a supporter of the charity Cancer Research UK, Aspel was made a Freeman of the borough of Elmbridge, Surrey, in April 2008.

A 2004 article in The Independent reported that Aspel had a dormant case of non-Hodgkin lymphoma. He gets it checked annually.

== Charity work ==
Aspel is a Vice-President of The Children's Trust, a UK charity for children with brain injury. He is also a Patron and long time supporter of the Princess Alice Hospice, Esher and The British Evacuees Association.

He is one of nine presidents of Better Planet Education.

== Other works ==
- Aspel, Michael (1974). Polly Wants a Zebra: The Memoirs of Michael Aspel. London: Weidenfeld & Nicolson. ISBN 9780297768357.

Media offices
Preceded by Tom Sloan	Eurovision Song Contest UK Commentator; 1969	Succeeded by David Gell
Preceded by Pete Murray	Eurovision Song Contest UK Commentator; 1976	Succeeded by Pete Murray
First	Give Us a Clue host 1979 – '84	Succeeded by Michael Parkinson
Preceded by Hugh Scully	Host of Antiques Roadshow; 2000–2008	Succeeded by Fiona Bruce
