= David Battie =

Antiques expert

David Battie FRSA
- Born: David Anthony Battie; 22 October 1942 (age 84); England
- Occupations: Antiques expert; Director at Sotheby's auction house (1965–1999); Writer/editor; former TV presenter (Antiques Roadshow (1977–2020); Public lecturer
- Years active: ?–2020 (retired)
- Known for: Expert on ceramics, specialising in oriental works
- Television: Antiques Roadshow

David Battie FRSA (born 22 October 1942) is a British retired expert on ceramics, specialising in Japanese and Chinese artefacts.

== Career ==
After attending art school, where he studied graphic design, Battie worked for Reader's Digest magazine for three years. In 1965, he joined the auction house Sotheby's. He worked in the Departments of Ceramics and Oriental Works of Art and was appointed a director in 1976. He retired from Sotheby's in 1999.

After leaving Sotheby's, he became editor of Masterpiece magazine and has written many books on pottery and porcelain. He also undertakes public speaking.

He is probably best known for his many appearances on the long-running BBC television programme Antiques Roadshow, in which he appeared for 43 years, from the first series in 1977 until his retirement in 2020.

== Personal life ==
David Battie married Sarah Francis, a glass expert from Sotheby's, in 1972. The couple have two daughters.

In 2012 Battie broke his leg in a fall. While in hospital he contracted an antibiotic-resistant infection and ultimately remained in hospital for six months, undergoing eight operations, including four skin grafts. Battie suffers from the genetic disorder haemochromatosis and has also developed Type 2 diabetes. He is an ambassador for the charity Antibiotic Research UK.

In 2022 and 2023 a number of Asian art, ceramics, antiques and historic textiles from the David & Sarah Battie Collection, were auctioned by Tennants and by Dominic Winter Auctioneers. The pieces included those from Qianlong period and from the 17th to 19th-century.

== Bibliography ==
- The Price Guide to 19th and 20th Century British Pottery (1975)
- Sotheby's Encyclopedia of Porcelain (editor, 1990)
- Sotheby's Encyclopedia of Glass (coeditor, 1991)
- Reader's Digest Treasures in Your Home (consultant editor, 1992)
- Understanding 19th Century British Porcelain (1994)
