= Paul Atterbury =

British antiques expert

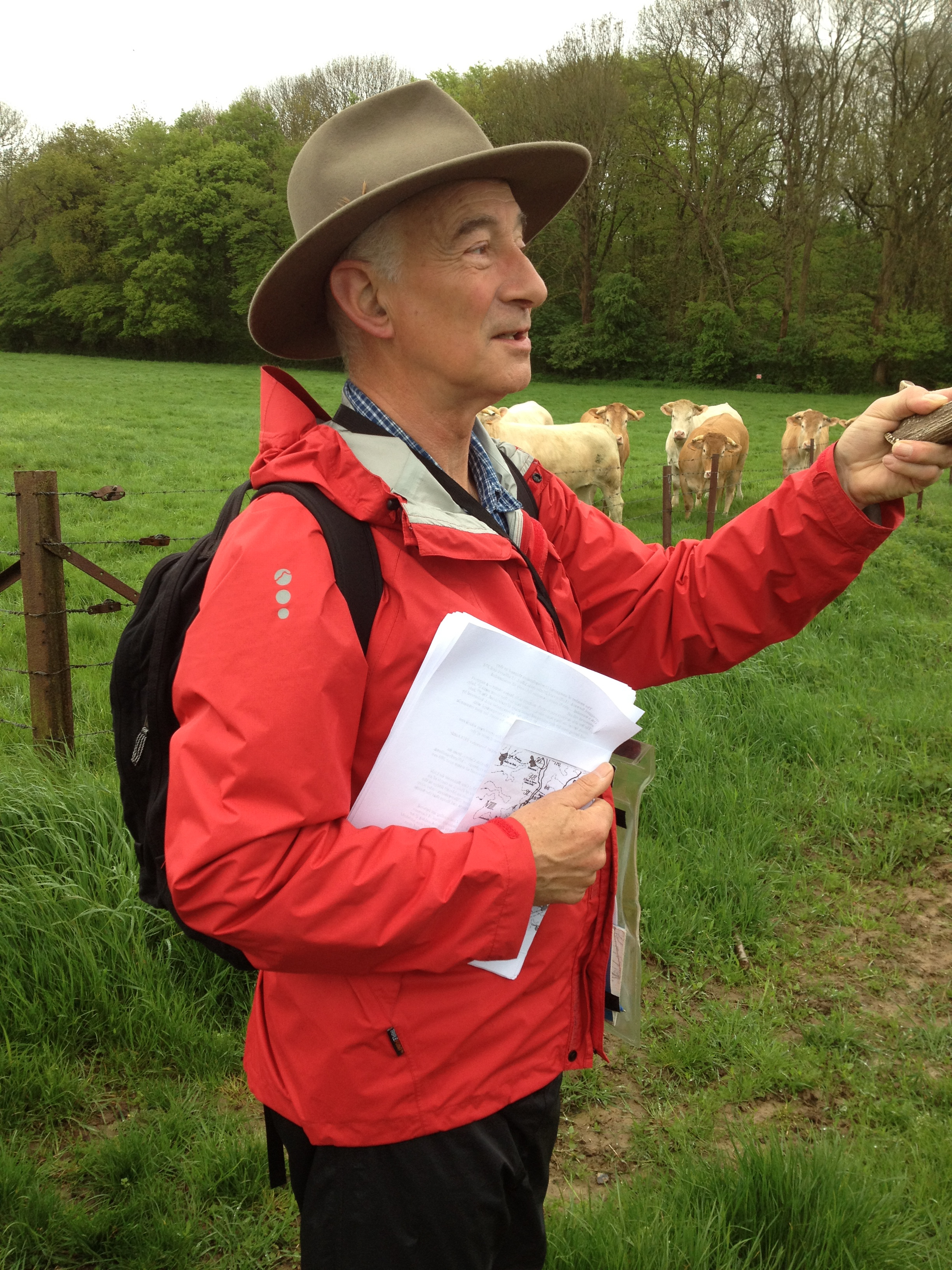
- Atterbury leading a guided walk in the Somme region in France
- Born: 8 April 1945 (age 81)
- Occupations: Writer; lecturer; curator; historian; broadcaster
- Known for: Specialism in the arts, architecture, design and decorative arts of the 19th and 20th centuries
- Television: Antiques Roadshow
- Parent(s): Audrey Atterbury; Rowley Atterbury
- Website: www.paulatterbury.com

Paul Rowley Atterbury FRSA (born 8 April 1945) is a British antiques expert, known for his many appearances since 1979 on the BBC TV programme Antiques Roadshow. He specialises in the art, architecture, design and decorative arts of the 19th and 20th centuries.

== Biography ==
He is the oldest son of Rowley Atterbury and puppeteer Audrey Atterbury (née Holman), who worked on the BBC children's television programme Andy Pandy in the 1950s.

He was educated at Westminster School and the University of East Anglia (BA, 1972). Originally training as a graphic designer, he later went on to work for Sotheby Publications. He became an historical advisor for Royal Doulton and was the editor of Connoisseur magazine from 1980 to 1981.

Since 1981, Atterbury has been a freelance writer, lecturer, broadcaster and exhibition curator. He curated for the Victoria and Albert Museum in London, his exhibitions there including "Pugin: a Gothic Passion" (1994) and "Inventing New Britain: the Victorian Vision" (2001).

Atterbury has written or edited over 30 books, mostly on ceramics. He has published books of old postcards showing Eype and West Bay, two Dorset villages. He is also known for his travel writing, and has written books on railways and canals. When British Waterways commissioned Robert Nicholson Publications to produce a series of guides to their waterways in the early 1970s, Atterbury and Andrew Darwin were supplied with a chartered boat and a student to drive it, in which they toured the canal network, producing the material for what became the first edition of the Nicholson Guides.

Until 2003, Atterbury was chairman of the Little Angel Theatre puppet theatre in Islington, north London. He has toured the country with his stage show 'Have You Had it Long Madam?' with fellow Antiques Roadshow expert Hilary Kay; the show visited Australia in 2009.

In 2007, Atterbury appeared on Channel 4's archaeology series Time Team talking about Augustus Pugin, and in 2009 he narrated BBC Four's documentary The Last Days of the Liners which examined how, in the years following World War II, countries competed to launch the most magnificent passenger ships on the great ocean routes. He is a Fellow of the Royal Society of Arts.

The 1978 rescue of the Gilbert Bayes Doulton House Frieze during demolition of the former Royal Doulton Pottery premises in the Albert Embankment, Lambeth, was only made possible by the efforts of Atterbury.

Atterbury is the owner of the only remaining Teddy puppet from the television series Andy Pandy that is not kept as part of a museum collection; it was originally a gift to his mother.

He lives in Weymouth in Dorset with his second wife, Chrissie, whom he married in 2002.

== Selected publications ==
- 1994: Pugin: a Gothic Passion. New Haven: Yale University Press (as co-editor) ISBN 978-0-300-06014-0
- 2001: Victorians at Home and Abroad. London: V & A Publications. ISBN 978-1-85177-329-9 (With Suzanne Fagence Cooper)
- 2002: Poole Pottery: Carter and Co. and Their Successors 1873–2002. Richard Dennis ISBN 978-0-903685-86-3
- 2006: Branch Line Britain: A Nostalgic Journey Celebrating a Golden Age. Newton Abbot: David & Charles (2006) ISBN 978-0-7153-2416-5
- 2007: Along Lost Lines. Newton Abbot: David & Charles ISBN 978-0-7153-2568-1
- 2007: Victorian House Style Handbook. Newton Abbot: David & Charles ISBN 978-0-7153-2705-0 (as editor)
- 2008: Tickets Please: A Nostalgic Journey Through Railway Station Life. Newton Abbot: David & Charles ISBN 978-0-7153-2876-7
- 2008: Moorcroft: a Guide to Moorcroft Pottery 1897–1993. Richard Dennis ISBN 978-0-9553741-0-4
- 2009: All Change! (AA Illustrated Reference). Automobile Association ISBN 978-0-7495-5785-0
- 2013: Mapping Britain's Lost Branch Lines. David & Charles ISBN 978-1-4463-0283-5
