= Antiques Roadshow (series 28) =

Series of the British television series (2005–2006)

Antiques Roadshow is a British television series produced by the BBC since 1979. Series 28 (2005/06) comprised 25 editions that were broadcast by the BBC from 4 September 2005 – 19 March 2006.

The dates in brackets given below are the dates each episode was filmed at the location. The date not in brackets is the episode's first UK airing date on BBC One.

Series / Episode Aired	Location	Host & Experts	Notes
28/1; 2005-09-04	Lichfield Cathedral; Lichfield; Staffordshire	Michael Aspel & John Axford; Andrew Davis; Paul Atterbury; Hilary Kay; Lars Tharp	– first edition by Samuel Johnson – Punch and Judy figures, carved wood covered with Gesso, mid-19th century from travelling theatre, including Pantaloon, £5,000 – scrapbooks of Victorian era Royalty of Europe, £1,000 – 1910 Art Nouveau glass fronted cabinet for china, made in satinwood, £1,500 – teddy bear with silver-coloured fur made by J. K. Farnell c1910, £5,000 – bronze statue of Egyptian god Amun, from Howard Carter's estate, 600BC, £3,000 – Tunstall, Staffordshire pottery from 'Lingard Webster', potted by Charles Hancock (sculptor) who trained Clarice Cliff. Woman who lived in a shoe, 1909, Queen Mary ordered two for Princess Margaret and Princess Elizabeth. – bronze sculpture of airman by Dora Gordine, 1942, 4 of 6, £6,000 – collection of theatrical memorabilia, 6,000 pieces ranging from Roman theatre tickets, tricks of Chung Ling Soo conjuror (alias of William Ellsworth Robinson). Letter by Harry Houdini, – set of 19th century South American mate drinking cups, £150 each, plus silver Bombilla (drinking straws), £30 each, – reverse painting on glass and paper composite of Georgian country house landscape by an English painter. £4,000 – longcase clock with automaton, by John Alker of Wigan, 1830s. Decorated with Saint Matthew the Evangelist, Mark the Evangelist, Luke the Evangelist and John the Apostle, plus Faith, Hope and Charity and panels of HMS Victory, Lord Nelson scenes, £10,000 – collection of oriental items, including Catalogue of artistic Japanese bronzeware and brassware. Bronze lion £9,000 – 1889 painting of Alfred Nicholson Leeds, palaeontologist. An early work by 17-year-old William Nicholson (artist), £12,000 – double-barrelled Pistol sword – seven-barrelled Volley gun (Nock gun) £35,000 – pair of H.W. Mortimer pistols, owned by Lord Nelson, – jewellery and memorabilia from lady Charlotte Knollys and Alexandra of Denmark (Queen Alexandra), given to nanny Martinham c.1902. Sir John Knollys' medallion from the coronation of Edward VII of the United Kingdom £600; brooch £1,200; reverse painted medallion, (Essex crystal) £1750; wrist watch £2000; brooch £2,000 – Lord Nelson's sword pistol – valued at £20,000
28/2; 2005-09-11	University of Wales; Lampeter; Ceredigion, Wales	Michael Aspel & Richard Price; Paul Atterbury; Lars Tharp	– bust of Dylan Thomas – book of early silhouettes, – plate worth £10,000.
28/3; 2005-09-18	Edinburgh; Scotland	Michael Aspel & Hilary Kay; Lars Tharp; Eric Knowles	– Mickey Mouse mascot, – Art Deco figurine that belonged to the bodyguard to Edward VIII and Mrs Simpson.
28/4; 2005-09-25	Normanby Hall; Scunthorpe; North Lincolnshire	Michael Aspel & Eric Knowles; Hilary Kay; David Battie; Christopher Payne; Nicholas Mitchell; Andrew Davis	– Royal Worcester powder blue vases, 1928–1932, painted by Edward Townsend, Moseley, and Albert Schuck. £4,000 – 1930s children's double rocking chair, £250 – Biedermeyer sofa made pine and Karellian birch from Baltic / Russian area, 5,000 – two cup and saucer sets by Susie Cooper, decorated by carving and 'Scrafito, 1950s, £100 and £150 – Victorian watercolour of two sisters, gifted by Charles Longley, Archbishop of Canterbury, painted by Janet Russell, 1870, (member of the Society of Women Artists) £2,000 – WWII memorabilia, pics and shrapnel and log book £500 – collection of 400 lawn mowers – white marble bust by Agathon Leonard, 1900s Art Nouveau, £15,000 – 22 Toy Footballers, (cast Lead) with 'Flick n Kick'action. England team in full Union Jack shirts versus 11 'Johnny Foreigners', £500 – christening mug from Crowle, 1856 – collection of porcelain models of German ladies sunbathing. Possibly Gebruder Heubach, £100-£200 each – Collection of cycling posters from the 1920s-1960s, Raleigh Cycles, et al., £150 each – 1680s Secretaire en portefeuille in English oak, £3,000 – Leather box containing Edwardian motoring Picnic set, 1911 Royal Doulton (20 dots) Cups, saucers, teapot, cream jug, sugar bowl, plus kettle and burner, £1,500 – Embroidered 17th century panel, of Charles 1st, includes Figure of Smell £5,000 – Pair telescopic candlesticks, hallmarked Matthew Boulton, Birmingham, 1816, £6,500 – a pair of candlesticks won in a newspaper competition
28/5; 2005-10-02	Pannier Market, Tavistock, Devon; Devon	Michael Aspel & Keith Baker; Nicholas Mitchell; David Battie	– prison uniform and a cat o'nine tails from Dartmoor (HM Prison), – hunting horn used at D Day – a plate worth £1,000.
28/6; 2005-10-09	Compilation episode Lichfield & Normanby Hall	Michael Aspel & Christopher Payne; Paul Atterbury; Hilary Kay; Lars Tharp; Eric Knowles	– Ring of the Romanian Royal Family, – Arts and Crafts Movement bed – undertaker's collection of coffinalia.
28/7; 2005-10-16	Ipswich; East Anglia	Michael Aspel & Ian Harris; Christopher Payne; Paul Atterbury; Lars Tharp	– Duke's chamber pot used for champagne, – early record player – a white elephant valued at £1500.
28/8; 2005-10-23	Beamish Museum; County Durham	Michael Aspel & Paul Atterbury; Lars Tharp; David Battie	– 1910 painting, probably of Virginia Wolff by unknown artist. probably £2,000 – walking stick containing glass bottle and goblet. Early 19th century polished bootwood. £200 – collection of ceramics from Sunderland, Tyneside, Jug from Northumberland Pottery, Thomas Feel bowl £450; Jar £700; Skinners (Addison and Falkener); Dixon & Co; Seaham Pottery; Total value £2,500 – rapier with Repoussé (rehammered) bowl made in 1624, smuggled out of Russia by Bolshoi Ballet Company. – belt and buckle of North Eastern Railway (UK) policeman. £400 – collection of World War I shell cases, Trench art. Shell case dedicated to Thomas Alfred Jones Victoria Cross and Distinguished Conduct Medal – decorated Hearth tiles from the 1880s by William De Morgan (a colleague of William Morris) he studied Lusterware techniques in Italy. £500 each – Royal household memorabilia from the 1950s, Private snapshots and letters from Queen Elizabeth The Queen Mother, Princess Elizabeth and Princess Margaret. £350 – biscuit barrel by Royal Doulton, transfer printed, £80 – 'Walsall clock' mechanism mounted on marble base, (6 spoke wheels, strike silencer, days of week and date) £6,000 – Puritee (Purity) – Fine Art moulded terracotta bust of beautiful Art Nouveau girl by Friedrich Goldscheider. 1897, £2,000 – Symphonium dual turntable Music box, £20,000
28/9; 2005-10-30	Manderston House; Duns; Berwickshire	Michael Aspel & Christopher Payne; David Battie; Paul Atterbury	
28/10; 2005-11-06	Rochdale Town Hall; Rochdale; Greater Manchester	Michael Aspel & Lars Tharp; Eric Knowles	– Rochdale Great hall with a Hammerbeam roof and Mintons tiled floor – pair French 'bisque' figures, 1870s £700 – Royal Doulton pot with 'Chinet decoration, 1900s, £100 – 19th century chests / coffers using bits of 1542 and 1616 wood, £120- £250 – gold propelling pencil, gifted and inscribed by George IV of the United Kingdom, £700 – autograph album and memorabilia assembled by 1950s band leader Geoff Love. £250 – 1960s painting of Grasmere in the Lake District by William Heaton Cooper (son of Alfred Heaton Cooper), £2,000 – late 19th century Chinese desk, £5,000 – collection of Cigarette packets, sometimes several manufacturers per town. e.g. Lambert & Butler, 1902 coronation box of 22 carat gold tipped cigars with images of Edward VII of the United Kingdom and Alexandra of Denmark – Polyphon Musical box, 1880s, American, playing vertically mounted tin discs, 1907, £5,000 – pair of plates made of pottery scraps from the 1850s-1920s, £150 – doll made by Armand Marseille of Sonneberg and Koppelsdorf, Thuringia, Germany £350 – doll made by Pierre-François Jumeau of 'tete jumeau', France, £2,000 – Glass vase by Keith Murray (ceramic artist) of New Zealand, for Stevens & Williams / Royal Brierley. £400 – cracked 1920s porcelain bowl, used by a prisoner of war during building the Burma Railway in World War II – Albert Pierpoint archive, pictures, record books, signed dedication in autobiography, £5,000 – L. S. Lowry's paint brushes, £1,000 – Pilkington's Lancastrian Pottery & Tiles from Swinton, – 1906 plate decorated with river and bridge scene by Foy Evans, £150 – jar – iridescent glaze, lustre ware decoration by 'William Salter Mycock' please. £1,500 – jar – ruby lustre by Richard Joyce (RJ), £800 – jar – honey glaze decorated by Richard Joyce (RJ), £2,000 – shagreen (shark skin) cover containing pocket globe made by 'Cary's Pocket Globes', 1791, £3,000
28/11; 2005-11-13	Chelsea pensioners Royal Hospital, Chelsea; Chelsea, London	Michael Aspel & Paul Atterbury; Hilary Kay; Eric Knowles; Geoffrey Munn; John Sandon; John Axford; John Bly; Paul Atterbury	– collection of jewellery £15,000. Cufflinks and letter, gifted by George VI of the United Kingdom in 1937; items made by Collingwood & Co of 171 New Bond Street, London, and by Hennell Of Bond Street Ltd (c. 1739–2001) – northern Italian desk, 1580–1620, in the Rococo and middle eastern styles, with decorations of Jonah and the whale drawn with ink. Modified in the 1690s to fit on stand, £5,000 – Art Deco crocheted French Miser's Purse, 1920–1925, decorated with cut steel beads, £300 – carved wooden bee (One of Four), lacquered, looted/stolen from the ancient Burmese throne when the palace was sacked by the British Army, possibly tens of thousands of pounds – shawl received as gift at the Delhi Durbar of 1911, valued at 'hundreds of pounds' – buttons from Charles Dickens' smoking jacket, in leather bound presentation volume with letter of provenance signed by Georgina Hogarth, (his wife's sister, his mistress), dated 9 June 1870. Leather book/box made by Riviere & Sons, te leading bookbinders of London and Bristol. £2000 – collection of ice-cream memorabilia and historic artefacts. – Bronze sculpture of Russian Ice Cream Seller by 'Jacques'? for holding 'penny lick' glasses (good for spreading tuberculosis). – hot toddy lifter, (glass pipette) – one man's medals from the Royal Scots Greys and Royal Horse Guards regiments. £1,500 – 1910 painting of adopted aunt by William Robert Symonds. Exhibited at the Royal Academy in 1910, £10,000 – 'triple top', cheatproof gaming table/roulette wheel, built by Sir Hiram Maxim on request from Edward VII to prove the integrity of the gaming industry. Lord Roslynn had complained vociferously that he was continually being cheated by 'fixed roulette wheels', but he then lost in a public challenge with Hiram Maxin. – pair of cups and saucers designed for shakey hands. Made by the Manufacture nationale de Sèvres, marked Louis XV of France 1766, painted by Guillaume Noël, £10,000 – David Linley – wooden folding 'pocket lectern' for reading at the table. 1840 – David Linley – Humidor, based on the four gates of Istanbul, – 1816 box containing secret cameo bust of Napoleon and messages of homage. Decorated with painted images, birds, Ouroboros (snake eating its tail and the French Imperial Eagle. Owned by Empress Eugénie, Inscribed Violettes £2,000 – World War I trench maps of Armentières and Arras, £100 each – chased gold, silver and enamel Art Nouveau brooch showing four faces, made by the goldsmith 'Louis Aucoc of Paris', (The master who taught René Lalique). Gifted to a brave lady who vanquished two armed assailants. £8,000 – a gilded bee from a royal throne.
28/12; 2005-11-20	Winter Gardens; Ventnor; Isle of Wight	Michael Aspel & Eric Knowles; Paul Atterbury; David Battie; Ian Harris; Richard Price; Nicholas Mitchell; Andrew Davis; Natalie Harris; Henry Sandon; Mark Alum; Geoffrey Munn; Christopher Paigne; Katherine Higgins	– late 19th century carved mahogany girondelle (mirror), £2,000 – collection of Sandpaintings of the Isle of Wight, £20 each – 1920s hat in box £80 – fake French impressionism painting (after) Alfred Sisley, £200 – loving cups with names on, e.g. Silence £600 – jug in the style of peasant art, 1850, £250 – 1898 walking stick, with bronze head of a donkey with pop-up ears and opening mouth. Made by 'Thomas Brigg & sons of London', (In 1893, Thomas Brigg and Sons received its first Royal warrant of appointment from Her Majesty Queen Victoria – the first umbrella maker to be thus honoured.), £1,500 – Isle of Wight Austin 7 club, 75 members, 90 Austin Motor Company cars: Austin 7s; Austin limosines and taxi, 1924 Austin 12. – Scottish escritoire, Glasgow school of Art Nouveau inlaid, ivory handles, made by Messrs 'A Gardner and sons', (Jamaica Street Warehouse, Glasgow, 1850–1935), 1900s £1,000 – two shells decorated with cameo scenes, carved in Naples, 1880s, £600 – telescope by Richard & Joseph Beck of London, (R & J Beck), 1837. (originally owned by Major Parr of Parr's Bank, £2,000 – painting that survived a Zeppelin raid on London with the 1916 newspaper story. – Large dragonfly car mascot by René Lalique, late 1920s. Taken from father's Alvis and mounted on plinth made from 1960s television tube. £3,000 – Japanese carved cabinet, late 19th century, bought new by 2 sisters on world cruise, £15,000 – family portrait of 15-year-old Douglas Clifton Brown, 1st Viscount Ruffside who became Speaker of House of Commons in 1943. Plus his sisters Elsie who became Lady Bradford, and Isla. Painted by Alfred Edward Emslie circa 1895, £15,000 – Troika Pottery vase repainted Turquoise (colour) with glitter highlights. Sculpted by Alison Brigden 1973–1983, value £1, not £200 because of repainting – 1900s English Art Nouveau brooch, gold, silver and diamonds, £3,000 – poster from Antiques Roadshow in Ventnor on 8 October 1987.
28/13; 2005-11-27	Compilation Episode Beamish Museum & University of Wales; Lampeter & Manderston House	Michael Aspel & Nicholas Mitchell; Lars Tharp; Hilary Kay; David Battie; Ian Harris; Christopher Payne; Gordon Lang; Martin Levy; Natalie Harris; Phillip Mould; Mark Alum; Geoffrey Munn; Bonny Campione	Beamish – Oil painting by Matthew White Ridley titled Two strings to the bow, 1863, value £5,000 – Edward VIII Coronation / abdication mug, valued at £800 – silver box from Württemberg in the Jūgendstils style of Art Nouveau, value £500 – 1920s Art Deco cocktail cabinet, £300 Lampeter – early fan mail and memorabilia for Elton John, pictures, autograph, programs – jewellery collection from the 1880s, Belle Époque, Art Deco and 1950s, value £15,000 – chest of drawers value £7000 – collection of watercolour paintings by Rita (Ita) (Bridget) and Jess Jardine, Rita painted posters and 'carriage art' for railways, (possibly NER). £700-£1,000 each – 1900s Japanese vase depicting the Seven Sages of the Bamboo Grove, blue undercoat enamelled on top, value £1,800 – Edwardian postcard collection Manderston – 1830s marine chronometer made by 'Ellicott and Smith', value £2,000 – 1950s jewellery, lyrebird brooch in 'baguette cut' diamonds, £10,000; and Cartier SA diamond ring, value £6,000 – 1915 wax doll used as shop mannequin, value £1,000 – collection of 19th century Canton porcelain Chinese plates value £6,000
28/14; 2005-12-04	Ashton Hall (Lancaster Town Hall); Lancaster, Lancashire	Michael Aspel & Eric Knowles; Nicholas Mitchell; Christopher Payne; Paul Atterbury; John Benjamin; Andrew Davis; Hilary Kay	– centrifugal leaf table by Robert Gillow cabinetmaker at Lancaster Town Hall – c. 1850 Gillows cabinetmaker's tool chest incl. 3 Norris planes, 30 moulding planes £3000 – silver 'Challenge cup' donated to Lancaster Agricultural Society by Lady Ashton, value £500 – Eltonware pots by Sir Edmund Elton of Clevedon, value £150 each – 1920s Columbia Grafonola gramophone/Graphophone cabinet and records. – a pair of miniature ceramic clogs labelled Bizarre by Clarice Cliff, £800 – a series of letters from the Crimean War, £500 – 1855 oil painting of rural scene by Thomas Sidney Cooper, £6,000 – collection of c.1200 20th century silk and rayon-crêpe scarves by Hermès, Ferragamo, Emilio Pucci et al. – 1950s mannequin and corsetry, £200 – pair of c. 1900 bronze Japanese 'rat' sculpture £800 – 1865 English Renaissance Revival silver Bonbon dish – collection of Victorian/Edwardian Music hall postcards and trade-cards, – anti-slavery ring (£2,000), – portrait miniature of Anne Francoise Carr, married Jean Claude Hubert in London c. 1784 – late 19th century Paisley rug, £800 – bollard/pot from Morecambe promenade, made by Leeds Fireclay company, £500 – Mrs Buck's 'Farmhouse Recipes and Remedys' book, from Westmorland, c.1700, £800 – intricate 17th century domestic embroidery of the 'enchanted garden of Ceres' (Roman goddess), £10,000
28/15; 2005-12-11	Coughton Court; Studley & Alcester; Warwickshire	Michael Aspel & Nicholas Mitchell; Lars Tharp; Hilary Kay; David Battie; Ian Harris; Christopher Payne; Gordon Lang; Martin Levy; Natalie Harris	– 1900s automaton mechanical toy by Fernand Martin (France), Le Pochard (the drunkard) – pair of paintings by Robert Lenkiewicz of Diogenes (Edward Mackenzie). £4,000 each. – Essex crystal brooch including picture of dog, c. 1880, carved from rock crystal by William Essex £2,000 – Japanese depiction of skeletons dancing – collection of Birmingham City and Wolverhampton Wanderers football programs. – slip cast German porcelain statue of monkey, early 19th century, £1,000 – 1730–1750 chest of drawers from Czechoslovakia, £12,500 – pair of 1920s bronze porcelain and ivory statues by Claire Jeanne Roberte Colinet of Brussels and Paris, £3,000 and £8,000 – oil painting, £2,000 – pair of Matthew Boulton of Birmingham silver candlesticks, £600 – 1774 Neo-classic silver claret jug by Daniel Smith and Robert Sharp, commemorating the sinking of the "Lord Mansfield" c.£1000 – collection of wood and ivory 'Netsuke' ornaments, (belt decorations) – John Player & Sons Navy Cut Cigarette packet with pop-up mice £10 – Graphic designs, needlework and posters of London Underground by Margaret Calkin James of The Rainbow Workshops. 1920s onwards. up to £1,000 each – collection of 1780s Royal Worcester china, c.£3-500 each – Lost masterpiece, landscape painting by Alfred William Hunt, dated 1869, up to £60,000
28/16; 2005-12-18	Coughton Court; Studley & Alcester; Warwickshire	Michael Aspel & Christopher Payne; Hilary Kay; David Battie	– Welsh dresser, £5,000, with Gaudy Welsh jugs and pottery by Charles Allerton & Sons of Stoke on Trent – Merrymakers, toy piano played by mice, made by Louis Marx and Company in the 1930s, £800-£1,000 – Japanese Satsuma ware earthenware pottery, 1860s chrysanthemum design jar, £5,000 – Letter by Agatha Christie, £800 – bronze medal presented to crew members of RMS Carpathia, that aided the RMS Titanic, (14 gold, 110 silver, 180 bronze medals minted), £2,000 with caveats – Art Deco painted bronze statuette, by Josef Lorenzl value £1800 – late 18th century male doll, £800-1000 – oil painting from the 1640s, influenced by Van Dyke, £3000 – helmet of the 1st Shropshire Rifle Volunteers, 1879, £400 – album of photographs, postcards and autographs, of Hollywood stars from the 1920s-50s, £2,000 – enamel, copper and pewter clock by Archibald Knox (designer) of the Arts and Crafts Movement, designed for Liberty & Co, 1906, £5,000 – carved alabaster chess set from Canton, Southern China, 1850s, £6,000 – paintings by Vladimir Tretchikoff, (Balinese girl, Black lady, Chinese Girl (Green lady)), £100s – statue of Princess Elizabeth on 'Tommy' the police horse, 1948 Royal Worcester limited edition of 100, modelled by Doris Lindner, painted by Harry Davis, £3,000 – tea caddy of glass jars and decanters, (marked George Rex) 1820s, £2500 – ivory and sandalwood box from northern India (Pasanthopan?), 1830s, £3500 – collection of 18th century drawings including Doctor James Boswell, £5,000 – Royal Worcester tea cup, transfer decorated, £50 – 1960s glass ash tray, Swedish, £100 – copper and oak cabinet, 1920s, £150
28/17; 2005-12-28	Next Generation; British Empire and Commonwealth	Michael Aspel & David Battie; Lars Tharp; Hilary Kay; Paul Atterbury	
28/18; 2006-01-01	University of Sydney; Sydney; Australia	Michael Aspel & Paul Atterbury; Eric Knowles; Hilary Kay	– pair of Royal Worcester porcelain jars decorated with Scottish Highlands scene painted by Harry Stinton, £3,000 / $8,000 Australian – painting of Sydney Cove c. 1820 by Major James Taylor (artist) of the 48th (Northamptonshire) Regiment of Foot, £1,500 / $3,000 – diorama of dead Australian birds, £1,200 / $4,000 – collection of 1920s watches by Léon Hatot: – diamond and onyx dress watch £2,000 / $5,000; platinum, diamond and onyx 'covered dial' watch £2,000 / $5,000; diamond and sapphire encrusted wristwatch £8,000 / $20,000 – Michael Aspel pulls on camera – collection of pots decorated with Indigenous Australian art (Aboriginal art) by Thancoupie (Gloria Fletcher, born Gloria James), £1,000 / $2,500 each – portable wardrobe 1920s £60 / $150 – opal brooch in gold frame, 1920s, £15,000 / $35,000 – Cricket memorabilia: signed bat from 1980s World Series Cricket £200; Ian Chappell's baggy green £4,000 / $8,000 – rolltop desk / chest of drawers made of Camphor laurel, Scots pine and Tasmanian blackwood by convicts, originally belonged to Dr Thomas Arndell (1753–1821) (see Arndell Park) who arrived with the First Fleet, £1200 / $3000 – 1830s chair made by convicts in Australian red cedar £350 / $800 – Manufacture nationale de Sèvres porcelain cup in leather case, made 1757, £10,000 in Europe, $8,000 in Australia – collection of Maria Callas memorabilia – photos, pictures and letters £125,000 / $250,000 – collection of pictures of English monarchy and consorts – from Anglo Saxons to Elizabeth II – Art Nouveau table by Carlo Bugatti, early 20th century, £2,500 / $5,000 – collection of smoking pipes carved in solid stone from Istanbul. Woman in bed comprising pipe shaped as head and body, and cigarette holder legs £1200 / $2000 – Complete tea set decorated with emblem of the Women's Social and Political Union (commonly known as Suffragettes), Made by H M Williamson & Son of Staffordshire in 1912. 6 cups, 6 saucers, 6 plates, cake plate, tea pot, milk jug, sugar bowl, £5000 / $10000 – part of the keel of Captain Cook's ship, HMS Endeavour
28/19; 2006-01-15	Norwich Cathedral; Norwich	Michael Aspel & Hilary Kay; Lars Tharp; Eric Knowles; Andrew Davis; Nicholas Mitchell; Ian Harris; Martin Levy; John Axford; Natalie Harris; Jon Baddeley; Steven Moore	– Surrey House, Norwich – St James Mill, Norwich – Strangers Hall, Norwich, weavers centre – early 17th century Ming Dynasty pot, (Wanli Emperor, 1573–1619), £10,000 – letter written by Lord Nelson £10,000 – bottle of 1900 whiskey with mouse inside £50-£150 – Chinese porcelain bowls, c.1700, £200 – peddler doll, covered with threads and buttons, (gromtahl) doll, c. 1850 £1,300 – painting of Norfolk wherries coming into harbour, by Thomas F. Goodall, £4,000 – mock Queen Ann Pitoscott deluxe radiogram, 1949, £1,500 – amber necklace, £400 – collection of Religious Relics – Victorian crinoline dress, £100 – cold painted bronze Buddha statue by Franz Xavier Bergman of Vienna (signed Namgreb), c1900 £700 – collection of porcelain, vase, 1900 candlestick Art Nouveau Florianware by William Moorcroft (potter). £1,000 – bronze Vesta case modelled on dog kennel, with Essex crystal image (carved from rock crystal, 1882 by Thomas Johnson (painter). £3,000 – letters from John Lennon's Aunt Mimi (Mimi Smith), with his guitar string – manuscript Book of hours, c.1450, £8,000 – 1920s reproduction George II of Great Britain miniature cabinet, model of wedding gift. £1,200 – collection of paintings of Walt Disney's English ancestors, 17th and 18th centuries, by George Cuitt, Henry Graves, et al., £2,000-£5,000 each (or double to Disney museum).
28/20; 2006-01-22	Norwich Cathedral; Norwich	Michael Aspel & Steven Moore; Lars Tharp; Eric Knowles; Ian Harris; David Battie; Hilary Kay	– 1904 teddy bear £400 and velveteen Peter Rabbit by Margarete Steiff GmbH, £500 – 24 piece Biaritz dinner service by Clarice Cliff, £2,500 – Japanese cast metal casket, 1890s, decorated with scenes, e.g. silver snow on Mount Fuji, £2,000 – 'over and under' 1770s shotgun by Joseph Bunney of Birmingham-London, Birmingham Gun Quarter, £15,000 – 17th century Venetian pottery – Pharmacy drug jar. £2,500 – pre-Reformation carved oak ceiling-boss from Catholic church. Matthew – one of Four Horsemen of the Apocalypse, – single pedestal sideboard, late 19th century, one of a pair owned by Edward VII, Mid-European, (Germany or Austria) 1830s, Biedermeier £15,000 – 3 original manuscripts by R. M. Ballantyne: The iron horse 16 August 1871; The Lifeboat; Fighting the flames, a tale of the London fire brigade. £3,000 each – collection of terracotta figurines, hand made in India during the British Raj, 1900s, £200 each – Japanese Netsuke waistband ornament, Cicada design carved in horn inlaid with ivory £1,000 – set of decorated golf themed buttons, 1910, £400 – Original artwork (1 of 13) of Cecil Aldin in 1912, illustrations for Black Beauty, by Anna Sewell, £4,000 each – ashtray/bowl in Chelsea porcelain, 1749–1751, £1,000 – silver 'Anglia knight', icon of Anglia Television, made in 1850 for the King William III of the Netherlands as the prize in a Falconry contest. from East Anglia Archive Centre. – 2 silver Morses (clasps) of the Dean and Bishop of Norwich. Designed by Sir Ninian Comper in 1902 for the coronation of Edward VII – engraved 'ladies visiting card' case, by Nathaniel Mills & Sons of Birmingham 1852, £2,000 – 2 pieces of porcelain that survived the Hiroshima blast at over 1300 degrees, which melted the glaze. "practically worthless but priceless"
28/21; 2006-02-05	Millennium Forum; Derry; Northern Ireland	Michael Aspel & John Axford; David Battie; Gordon Lang; Andrew Davis; Eric Knowles; Lars Tharp	– Spanish Armada shipwrecked at Northern Ireland, certificate and token absolving soldiers from sins – Belleek Pottery County Fermanagh, 1880s tea set; teapot in bamboo design, copy of Royal Worcester design, which was a copy of a Josiah Wedgwood design, which was a copy of 1700 Chinese (early Qing Dynasty) design. Tea set £150, Teapot £1,000 – painting of sick child by Caroline Paterson (sister of Helen Allingham) £4,000 – glass fronted cabinet, 1900s, £5,000 – Penal cross in Bog oak from the 1700s, used in Donegal, 1960s version made by Imogen Stewart £1,000 – autographed memorabilia from initial flights of Concorde 001 and Concord 002. Photograph £400, Postcard of 001, autographed by French crew on first day of issue. £150, Photo £400. – Glass cabinet / chest of drawers / Mirror, 1885–1910, Mahogany veneer on Pine base, inlaid with boxwood, satinwood and rosewood £3,000 1910 (sheraton revival) – plate decorated by Bruce Bairnsfather cartoon 1910, £15 – Staffordshire stoneware 'dog trough' 1840 £100 – 1880s Victorian Kitsch, silverplate Jug with Ivory handles by H & H (Hugin & Heap), designed by Doctor Christopher Dresser, £400 – Uncle Wiggily's Crazy Car, 1925 toy car by Distler Toys (founded by Johann Distler of Nuremberg, Germany), £1,000 – collection of World War II memorabilia of G.I.s stationed in Northern Ireland – collection (bound book) of 1820s Chinese paintings of natural history, flowers, on pith paper in Gouache. (bought in Cheltenham 1833) £2,500 – pin cushion made of human hair, 1812, £300 – Folding wheelchair 1914, beechwood, by E & R Garrould, Hospital furnishers, – 1860s table by Thomas Seddon (grandson of George Seddon (cabinetmaker)), who exhibited at the Great Exhibition of 1862. £12,000 – Silverware collection by the Lord Bishop of Derry in 1683. Jugs and plates – two 1665 communion flagons by different makers in Dublin; Alms dishes made in London 1674. Collection £100,000 – intricate hand cut pictures
28/22; 2006-02-12	Compilation episode Winter gardens Ventnor; Isle of Wight and Lancaster, Lancashire and Millennium Forum; Derry	Michael Aspel & Nicholas Mitchell; Ian Harris; Eric Knowles; John Benjamin	– Isle of Wight – Ventnor – painting by Düsseldorf artist, Carl Jutz, 1870. value £8,000 – Romeo and Juliet statues in French Bisque (pottery), unglazed porcelain, made by Eutrope Bouret in c. 1870 in the style of Giles Jeune. £1,000 – Mrs Beecher's Book of Recipes. 1710, £1,500 – electroplate Victorian 'spoon-warmer' modelled as a boat and beachscape. Design Registry Mark 1870, value £600 – Victorian Breakfast table in Burr walnut, value £1,200 – drawing by Queen Victoria's daughter Princess Alice of the United Kingdom, signed 'Alice, Osborne', 6 August 1886, value £1,500 – Lancaster – Swiss music box with veneer of African Thuja wood from the Atlas mountains, made by 'Paillard-Vaucher et Fils' (P.V.F. of Sainte-Croix) £1,800 – Longcase clock by William Parkinson of Lancaster (1739–1799) (Father of William Parkinson watchmaker of Prescott) value £2,000 – Royal Worcester porcelain cup and saucer, decorated with 'rustic scene' by Robert Hancock (engraver). value £500 – plain Meissen porcelain plate (second quality) decorated in London with flowers. value £1,500 – 1950s Alfred Dunhill Aquarium lighter, (decorated Perspex), value £1,500 – neo classical claret jug made in Bohemia for Viennese retailer 'J & L Lobmeyr'. £2,000 – group of 1930s Dinky Toys of aircraft (Die-cast toys), £250 each – Millennium Forum, Derry – iridescent cobalt blue 'Papillion glass' vase by 'Loetz' of Austria, (founded 1840 by Johann Loetz, now the Czech Republic). Vase 1900–1905, owned by Bernard Montgomery, 1st Viscount Montgomery of Alamein, £800 – decorated Book bindings in various leathers, vellum and pigskin. £2,000 – 18th century landscape painting by George Morland £4,500 – Jewellery collection – yellow (Cinnamon) diamond ring £10,000; Sapphire and diamond bracelet and necklace, £15,000; Van Cleef & Arpels ear-rings £15,000
28/23; 2006-02-26	Montacute House; Somerset	Michael Aspel & Christopher Payne; Paul Atterbury; Hilary Kay; Lars Tharp	– Location of Oscar-winning Sense and Sensibility by – Jane Austen – Observations on the Theory and Practice of Landscape Gardening by Humphry Repton, 1803, on permanent loan from the Czech National Library (until they discover exactly where it is), £3,000 – glazed red jug with sculpted figure as handle, 1900s Chignon (hairstyle), Art Nouveau, by Jonez? of Budapest, £2,000 – collection of 19th century Honiton lace, 1820s-1850s, – whale oil lamp/clock (glass bottle marked with hours), c1800, Dutch, £1,000 – 1580s chest, stained inlaid sycamore, with candle box £2,000 – 1920s Dutch chest, inlaid with Mother of pearl, in the style of the 1640s, £1,000 – miniature bowl by the House of Fabergé, marked Elena, Arkhangelsk, 1912, £2,500 – teapot decorated with anti-slavery poem, 'Staffordshire Pearlware', 1820s, £1,000 – painting of Mont Blanc from the 'Col de val' at the head of the Chamonix valley, by William Collingwood Smith, 1860, (the heyday of alpine mania) £8,000 – collection of vintage Undergarments from the 1800s onwards, leggings, free traders, Queen Victoria's knickers, – football memorabilia, autographed 1966 FIFA World Cup tickets, £20,000 – jug decorated in Scrafito style with poems, made by Edwin Beer Fishley of Fremington, Devon, Bideford, 1851, £5,000 – 'cold painted' bronze sculpture of parakeets on a leaf, made by Franz Xavier Bergman, Vienna, £1,500 – collection of 10,000 postcards, 1900s, £10-100 each – Snow White and the Seven Dwarfs porcelain statues dressed in cloth and felt, made by Chad Valley £1,800; – Edward VIII porcelain statue, dressed in cloth and felt, made by Chad Valley – £300, – collection of Nutcrackers – carved in various woods: ape's head in walnut, German, £500; 1880s man's head in cherrywood £600; rabbit's head £800 – blue enamel and diamond locket, '18th century revival' style from 19th century France, £5,000 – diamond and ruby Bumble Bee brooch meaning 'Bee sure of our love', made by Lacloche Frères, 1890s, £10,000 – set of chairs from the battle of Trafalgar
28/24; 2006-03-05	Montacute House; Somerset	Michael Aspel & John Sandon; Christopher Payne; Paul Atterbury; Keith Baker; Christopher Payne; David Battie; Paul Atterbury; Hilary Kay; Lars Tharp	– novelty camel teapot, 1745–1750, Staffordshire, English salt glaze, Thomas or John Wedgwood, £7,000 – Sewing box made of Antelope horn in India, 1820–40, Internal components in Ivory and Sandalwood, £1,000 – collection of 'wood engraving' illustrations by Clare Leighton, including Four Hedges – a Gardeners Chronicle (value £100) and Wedgwood plates £15 each – engraved relief silver 'wine label' of HMS Blenheim used for Brandy bottle. Made by William Elliott in 1838, possibly unique. £4,000 – longcase clock with documented provenance, gifted by Peter Carl Fabergé's son. Made in Russia in the 1840s using Karelian birchwood, includes regulator dial for Observational astronomy. value £15,000 (Insurance value £25,000) – early 20th century Arts and Crafts movement jewellery, made in Newlyn, Cornwall, possibly by Reginald Dick, £1,000 – collection of Chinese, plates, jars, buffet dishes. Pair of 1750s buffet dishes £4,000 – Japanese Seto porcelain, 1880, £400; – collection of 200 British Regency pictures, watercolours, drawings and cards from the Hippisley Coxe family of Ston Easton Park in Somerset, £2,000 – sideboard / dressing table, in Rosewood, Ebony and Calamander wood, inlaid in ivory, and Thuja wood from the Atlas mountains. Cedar wood drawers to keep spiders away, possibly made by 'Lamb of Manchester', £4,000 – carved statue of Japanese girl, 1900s, inlaid with Mother of Pearl using the Shibayama technique, £500 – paintings by Jacob Jacobs, 1844, ships coming into Antwerp harbour, £15,000. Faux Egyptian scene, £8,000 – tooled leather travelling case containing drinking glass, £1,000 – Memoirs of the Comte de Gramont, damaged by a cannonball at the Battle of Trafalgar whilst on board HMS Africa captained by Henry Digby (Royal Navy officer), Inscribed this book was shivered in this manner by a whole shot, knocking to pieces the bookcase ... off Cape Trafalgar on 21st October 1805 ... on board the 'Africa' (64 guns) signed Henry Digby. – carved wooden Claude glass, (named after artist Claude Lorrain), a framing device for planning paintings, carved in the Bushey school style. £1,200 – 1920 original illustration by E. H. Shepard for A. A. Milne's books. Owl, Eeyore and Winnie the Pooh, £30,000. Pooh being pulled out of the rabbit hole £50,000 – a steam-powered car
28/25; 2006-03-12	Royal Exhibition Building; Melbourne; Australia	Michael Aspel & Eric Knowles; Hilary Kay; Paul Atterbury; John Benjamin; Jon Baddeley	– Melbourne retailer, Myer, started in 1899 by selling buttons to Gold rush prospectors – box of 100 Magic lantern glass slides documenting the history of Kalgoorlie Gold rush 1898–1901. $50 each, $5,000 set, £2500 – collection of memorabilia of Cass Halliday, Master of HMS Orion at the Battle of Trafalgar 1805. His 'paying off pennant', flown on his last voyage in 1810 on HMS Ville de Paris, 1 foot per year of service; miniature portrait; ship's log book, $120,000 / £50,000 – 'standard' Wooton desk in American walnut, Burr walnut, fitted with satinwood / birch drawers. Also known as 'Wells Fargo desk'. $10,000 / £5,000 – Royal Worcester coffee set decorated with Australian flowers. Painted by Reginald Austin who copied original artwork by Ellis Rowan from Melbourne. Set is mid-1920s duplicate of the set presented to the Duke and Duchess of York at the opening of the Federal Parliament of Australia in 1927. – brooch with two silver kittens playing with a Pearl ball, Parfait set diamonds – $1600 / £750 – toy Papier-mâché dogs with wheels and 'growlers', 1860–1880s French, – photograph plus program printed on silk from the concert held at the Royal Exhibition Building in Melbourne, celebrating the opening of first federal parliament in Melbourne on 9 May 1901. Concert attended by The Prince George, Duke of Cornwall and York (later King George V). $1500 / £700 – Peacock automaton, walks and displays its tail, made in Paris in the 1890s, $5,000 / £2,500 – 1830s cast iron 'Warning Notice' from a bridge threatening transportation to Australia. The inscription reads NOTICE. Middlesex. Any person wilfully INJURING any part of this County Bridge will be guilty of a Felony, and upon conviction will be TRANSPORTED FOR LIFE. By the Court. Selby. George IV, 1830. $1200 / £500 – 1890 portrait by Tom Roberts, of Doctor Louis Lawrence Smith (1830–1910), (gold prospector, Melbourne doctor, pill manufacturer, speculator, politician, and theatrical entrepreneur), $80,000 / £35,000 – ornate glass Jar from Dudley, 4 layers of white, clear, white and yellow cameo glass carved by Thomas Webb (glassmaker), 1885–1890, $12,000 / £5,000 – enamelled bronze and ivory figure on a Brazilian green onyx base, 1925–30, designed by Austrian Art Deco sculptor Gerdago (born Vienna 1906, died Vienna 2004) de:Gerdago $48,000 / £20,000 – conch shell lamp with Kitsch decoration in painted Coral recoloured in pastel, $350 / £150 – tall son of an Earlsfield evacuee that Michael Aspel knew in the 1940s. – painting in natural ochres by Mick Namarari Tjapaltjarri, depicting a creation myth of a lizard/serpent shaping the landscape. Viewed horizontally as a spiritual map. $6,000 / £1500 – Sir Norman Everard Brookes's tennis memorabilia. Wimbledon tennis Singles trophies from 1907 and 1914. Reportedly the only two full sized trophies outside Wimbledon. $75,000 £30,000. Wimbledon Doubles winners jug $20,000 / £8,000. Wooden racket $5,000 / £2000 – Steiff black 'mourning bear' in memory of the RMS Titanic. Fitted with red crying eyes. 1905, up to $200,000 / £90,000
28/26; 2006-03-19	Season Retrospective	Michael Aspel & Christopher Payne; David Battie; Paul Atterbury; Hilary Kay; Lars Tharp; Eric Knowles	– Geofrey Munn: Chelsea Royal Hospital – – chased gold, silver and enamel Art Nouveau brooch showing four faces, made by the goldsmith 'Louis Aucoc of Paris', (The master who taught René Lalique). Gifted to a brave lady who vanquished two armed assailants. £8,000 – Eric Knowles: Art Nouveau bust in white marble by Agathon Léonard, £15,000 – Michael Aspel: collection of World War I shell cases, Trench art. Shell case dedicated to Thomas Alfred Jones Victoria Cross and Distinguished Conduct Medal – Christopher Paigne: Lancaster, tool chest belonging to cabinetmaker at Gillows of Lancaster, used by 3 generations of cabinetmaker c.1850, incl. 3 Norris planes, 30 moulding planes £3000 – Hilary Kay: Norwich, letters from John Lennon's Aunt Mimi (Mimi Smith), with his guitar string – 'sundial' auctioned for £2,300 for Leeds hospital. – Lars Tharp: 2 pieces of porcelain that survived the Hiroshima blast at over 1300 degrees, which melted the glaze. "practically worthless but priceless" – Paul Atterbury: part of the keel of Captain Cook's ship HMS Endeavour, with 1828 letter of provenance requesting it to be shipped to the UK from the wreck in the US. – Melbourne: needlework 'Family History sampler' by Sally Hemmingway aged 11 from Shrewsbury, Massachusetts, c. 1817 – Bonny Campione: Symphonium music box, £20,000 – Melbourne, collection of memorabilia of Cass Halliday, Master of HMS Orion at the Battle of Trafalgar 1805. His 'paying off pennant', flown on his last voyage in 1810 on HMS Ville de Paris, 1 foot per year of service; miniature portrait; ship's log book, $120,000 / £50,000 – Rupert Masse: Manderston – painting of Burnthwaite road, Fulham, by Christopher Chamberlain (Landscape and figure painter. Born 1 November 1918 at Worthing, Sussex), subsequently auctioned to local resident.
