= Ophelia Gordon Bell =

English sculptor

- Born: Winifred Joan Ophelia Gordon Bell; 1 July 1915; London, England
- Died: 1975 (aged 59–60); Grasmere, Westmorland, England
- Resting place: Grasmere Cemetery, Grasmere, Westmorland
- Spouse: William Heaton Cooper
- Children: Julian Cooper
- Parent: Winifred Gordon Bell (mother)

Joan Ophelia Gordon Bell (1915–1975) was an English sculptor, known for her several commissions for the United Kingdom's Atomic Energy Authority.

She was born in London on 1 July 1915, the daughter of the painter Winifred Gordon Bell, (née Billinge; full name Winifred Joan Ophelia Gordon Bell) and Frederick Lawrence Bell, and was raised in the St John's Wood area. In 1938, her address was listed as 13 Greville Place, London NW6.

She studied at Regent Street Polytechnic in the 1930s and exhibited at the Royal Academy, the Royal Glasgow Institute of the Fine Arts and the Royal Scottish Academy, all before the age of 24.

She married the landscape artist William Heaton Cooper (1903–1995) in 1940. They lived in Grasmere in the English Lake District, and had two daughters and two sons, one of them being the painter Julian Cooper. Both Bell and her husband were followers of the teachings of the Christian Moral Re-Armament movement. The couple held a joint exhibition at the Fine Art Society's London gallery in 1955. Her auction record is £120, set at Anderson & Garland's auction house in Newcastle-upon-Tyne on 14 July 2015, for her a composition sculpture of a mountaineer.

Bell died in Grasmere in 1975 and is buried in the village cemetery.

== Works ==
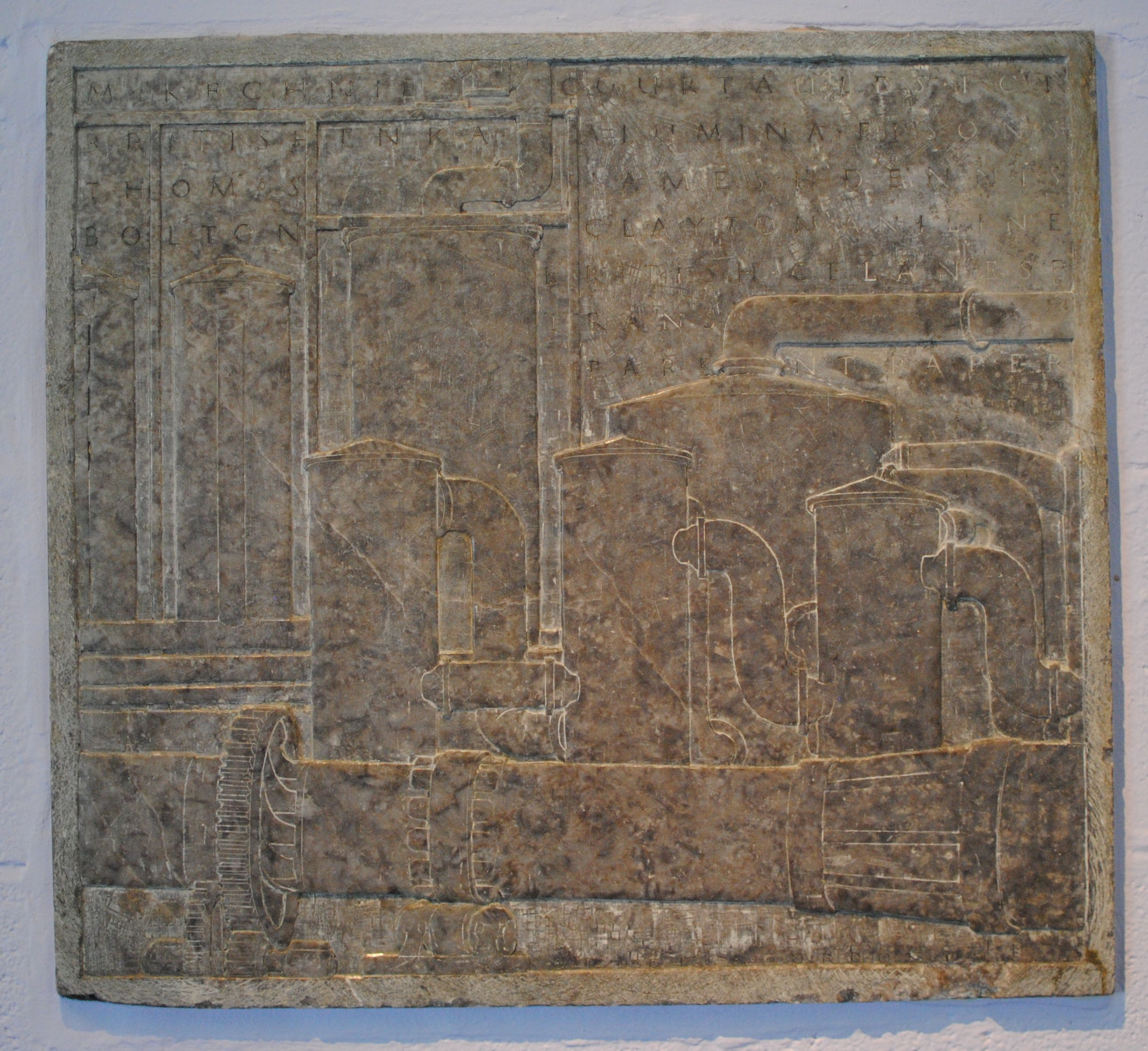
Relief carving of an anhydrite kiln, made from a piece of anhydrite

Her giant Portland stone figures, 'Thought' and 'Action', are outside the former Atomic Energy Authority offices in Risley, Lancashire.

The bronze bust Bell created of mountaineer Edmund Hillary (circa 1953) is in the Te Papa museum in Wellington, New Zealand. The plaster cast remains in Grasmere.

The Catalyst Science Discovery Centre, Widnes, has a relief carving of an anhydrite kiln, made from a piece of anhydrite, for the United Sulphuric Acid Corporation Ltd (an associate company of Fisons Fertilizers Ltd).

William and Dorothy in 1800, depicts William Wordsworth and his sister Dorothy.

St Oswald's Church, Grasmere has her stone sculpture of the Madonna and child.

The Challenge is in the foyer of Stubbins Primary School, in Ramsbottom.

The Breakthrough Cross (1966), on the roof of the Lady Chapel at the Church of Christ the Healer at Burrswood Hospital in Groombridge, is made from aluminium and scrap metal.

Other works are displayed at the Heaton Cooper Studio in Grasmere, which William Heaton Cooper had inherited from his father, the landscape artist Alfred Heaton Cooper. Formerly at Ambleside, William moved the gallery to Grasmere in 1938. It is now operated by John Cooper, another of Ophelia and William's sons. An exhibition of her work, "A Vital Spirit", is being held at the studio, from May–October 2015.

== Legacy ==
The Lakes Artists Society, of which Bell was a member from 1940 until her death, grants an annual 'Ophelia Gordon Bell Award' for sculpture "to encourage and reward excellence and innovation".
