= Joseph Bunney =

Joseph Bunney may refer to:-

- Joseph Bunney, 18th century gunsmith, see Antiques Roadshow (series 28)
- Joe Bunney (born 1993), English footballer
