= Stanley Pearl =

Australian soldier

Stanley Keith Pearl
- Born: 21 December 1893; Ulverstone, Tasmania
- Died: 9 August 1986 (aged 92); Canberra, Australian Capital Territory
- Military career
- Branch: First Australian Imperial Force
- Service years: 1915–1918
- Rank: Sapper
- Service number: 6756
- Units: 8 Field Company Engineers (Reinforcement 4) (March–August 1916); 5 Field Company Engineers (August 1916 – 1918)

Stanley Keith Pearl (21 December 1893 – 9 August 1986) was an Australian sapper with the First Australian Imperial Force during World War I, known for his trench art.

== Early life ==
Stanley Keith Pearl was born on 21 December 1893 in Ulverstone, Tasmania, the youngest child of Charles Pearl and Sophia Ann Wells. Pearl was a joiner by trade, and was a member of the Anglican church.

== World War I ==
After enlisting in his hometown on 9 November 1915 at 21 years of age, Pearl, in August 1916, became a sapper with the Australian 5 Field Company Engineers. He performed this role for the duration of the war.

He embarked from Sydney to Alexandria and then the Western Front (World War I) in France aboard HMAT Orsova on 11 March 1916. He undertook a brief stint with the 8 Field Company Engineers (Reinforcement 4) before joining the 5 Field Company Engineers. Pearl's Victory Medal (United Kingdom) and British War Medal are held in the Australian War Memorial's collection.

Pearl produced a large collection of trench art between 1916 and 1919. Pearl donated his trench art objects to the Australian War Memorial but whether this reflects the full extent of that which he produced in the context of war remains a mystery. A total of 15 of Pearl's oeuvre are held in the Australian War Memorial's Military Heraldry collection. Military shell cases, other parts of shells, badges and buttons were just some of the war-related materials used by Pearl to assemble everyday objects such as a clock, a map of Tasmania and a hat pin stand, as is evidenced by the accessibility and digitisation of his work on the War Memorial's online collection (see external links for selection of images). The collection displays images of the objects together with Pearl's own field notes, which were unusual to find in First World War trench art. Pearl used matter-of-fact language where tales of death became mere descriptions.

== Post-war ==
Pearl survived World War I. During March 1919, Pearl returned to Tasmania, although soon relocated to Canberra. He began working for the Australian War Memorial in 1941, the year that it opened, and worked as a carpenter and senior tradesman there until he retired. The electoral roll lists his position there as an "installation manager".

Stanley was married to Gertrude Iris, who had previously been married to Stanley's brother Ernest Tasman Pearl.

== Death and legacy ==
Stanley died at Woden Valley Hospital, Canberra, on 9 August 1986 at the age of 92 years, survived by Gertrude.

There is no evidence to suggest that Pearl is survived by anyone, nor have any photographs of him been discovered; He is an "enigma." his trench art is all that survives of his existence. His creative and artistic vision has contributed to the material culture of World War I. According to Corinne A. Kratz, Pearl was unconsciously engaging with features of material culture such as bricolage and recyclia in producing trench art.

A 2016-7 exhibition entitled Sappers & Shrapnel: Contemporary Art and the Art of the Trenches at the Art Gallery of South Australia showcased Pearl's trench art. The exhibition presented Pearl's pieces alongside other First World War trench art objects and more recent works of art that reflected on war today, by artists including Ben Quilty, Olga Cironis, Nicholas Folland, and Aboriginal women artists from Tjanpi Desert Weavers. Such a display, in bringing together the historical and the contemporary, was the first opportunity whereby the trench art of Pearl was exposed to a wider audience.

== Works ==
- Trench Art Chrysanthemum Vase, 1918-19
- Trench Art Clock, March 1918
- Trench Art Hat Pin Stand, May 1918
- Trench Art Map of Tasmania, 1917

== Bibliography ==
- The Australian Imperial Force (AIF) Project. "Stanley Keith Pearl." (n.d.) https://www.aif.adfa.edu.au/showPerson?pid=237003. University of New South Wales (UNSW) Canberra, Australian Defence Force Academy. Accessed 29 April 2017.
- Australian War Memorial collection. "Collections search: Sapper Stanley Keith Pearl." https://www.awm.gov.au/search/all/?query=sapper+stanley+keith+pearl&submit=&op=Search&format=list&section%5B0%5D=collections. Accessed 4 March 2017.
- Australian War Memorial collection. "British War Medal 1914-20: Sapper S K Pearl, 5 Field Company Engineers, AIF." https://www.awm.gov.au/collection/REL/21088.001. Accessed 29 April 2017.
- Australian War Memorial collection. "Victory Medal: Sapper S K Pearl, 5 Field Company Engineers, AIF." https://www.awm.gov.au/collection/REL/21088.002. Accessed 29 April 2017.
- Australian War Memorial. "First World War Embarkation Rolls: Stanley Keith Pearl." https://www.awm.gov.au/people/rolls/R1778164/. Accessed 4 March 2017.
- Kratz, Corinne A. "Rethinking Recyclia." African Arts 28, no. 3 (Summer 1995): 1,7,8, 10–12.
- Mitzevich, Nick. "Director’s Foreword." In Sappers & Shrapnel: Contemporary Art and the Art of the Trenches, Lisa Slade, 8–11. Adelaide: Art Gallery of South Australia, 2016.
- Neale, Kerry. "Decoration from Destruction: the First World War Trench Art of Sapper Pearl." Australian War Memorial, 28 April 2016. https://www.awm.gov.au/blog/2016/04/28/decoration-destruction-first-world-war-trench-art-sapper-pearl/. Accessed 5 March 2017.
- Saunders, Nicholas J. "Bodies of Metal, Shells of Memory: ‘Trench Art’, and the Great War Re-cycled." Journal of Material Culture 5, no. 1 (2000): 43-67.
- Saunders, Nicholas J. "Sapper Stanley Keith Pearl." In Sappers & Shrapnel: Contemporary Art and the Art of the Trenches, Lisa Slade, 13–39. Adelaide: Art Gallery of South Australia, 2016.
- Slade, Lisa. Sappers and Shrapnel: Contemporary Art and the Art of the Trenches. South Australia: Art Gallery of South Australia, 2016.
- Slade, Lisa. "Trench Art: Sappers and Shrapnel – On Trench Art and Material Culture in Contemporary Art." Art & War: Badlands. In Artlink 35, no. 1 (March 2015): n.p.
