= Runcorn War Memorial =

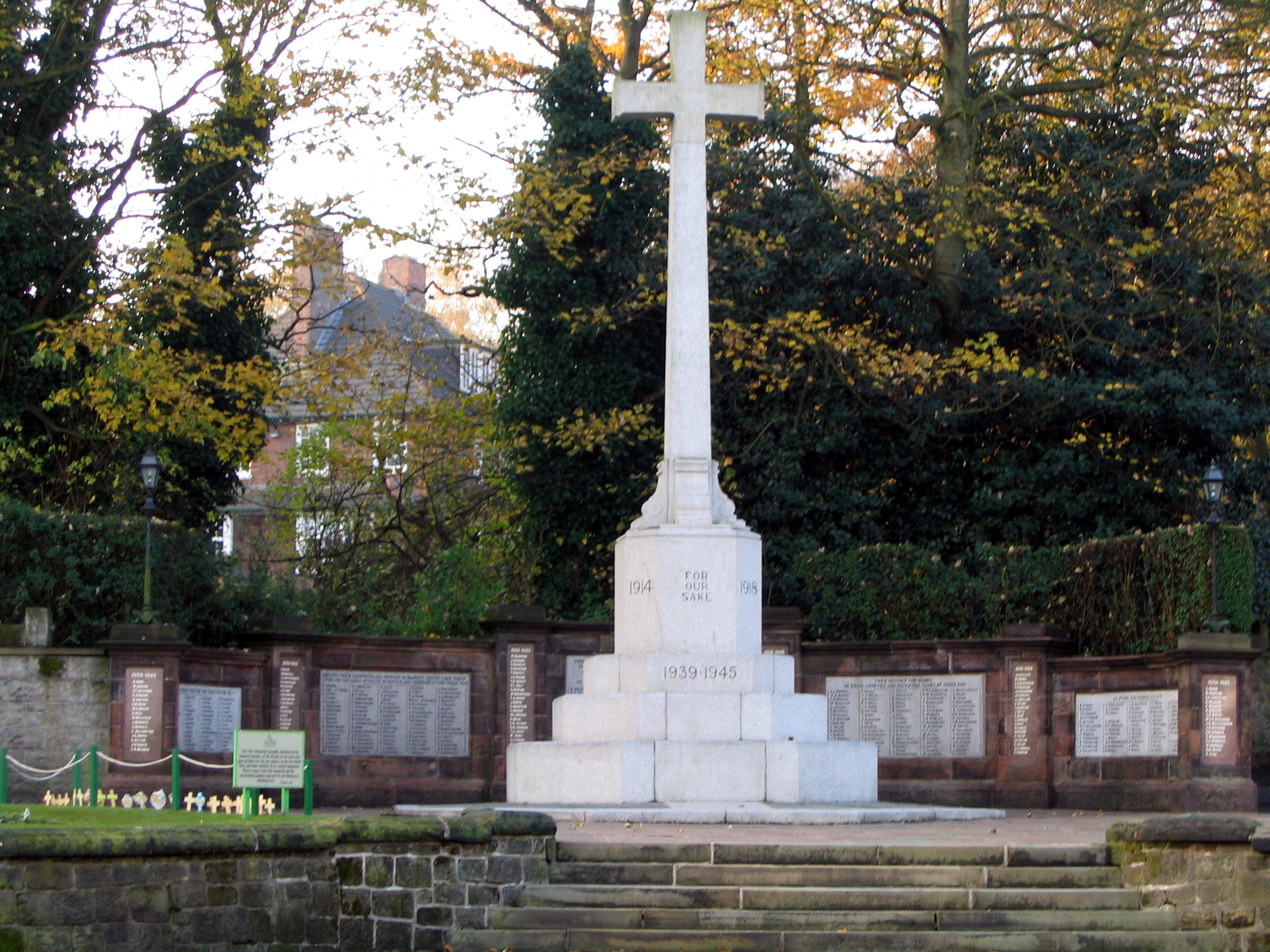
- Runcorn War Memorial

- Location in Cheshire
- 53.33343°N 2.73882°W
- Location: Runcorn, Cheshire, England
- OS grid reference: SJ5089982091

History
- Built: 1920

Site notes
- Architect: James Wilding
- Governing body: Halton Borough Council

Listed Building – Grade II
- Designated: 15 September 2016
- Reference no.: 1437933

Runcorn War Memorial was built to commemorate the servicemen of Runcorn lost in active service in the First World War. It was unveiled on Remembrance Sunday 1920 at 3:30pm, beginning a tradition of afternoon services. In 1948, the memorial was rededicated and the names of those lost in the Second World War were added. An inscribed stone was added later with the names of those lost in subsequent conflicts.

The memorial, set in a small garden, consists of a Latin cross in white granite on a plinth and steps. The names of the war dead are inscribed on a wall behind the cross. The memorial is recorded in the National Heritage List for England as a designated Grade II listed building.

== Location and history ==
The war memorial stands in a small garden at the junction of Greenway Road, Weston Road and Moughland Lane in Higher Runcorn. It was designed by James Wilding, and was unveiled on 14 November 1920 by Colonel William Bromley Davenport, the Lord-Lieutenant of the County of Chester, and by R. H. Posnett, Chairman of Runcorn Urban District Council. (Note: R. H. Posnett was the owner of Camden Tannery in the town and a local benefactor.) It was re-dedicated on 7 November 1948 when the names of those lost in the Second World War were recorded. Later a further inscribed stone was added with the names of those lost in subsequent conflicts.

== Description ==
The memorial is built in white granite from Kit Hill Quarry, Callington, Cornwall, and consists of a Latin cross, the shaft of which is about 3.5 metres (11 ft) high. The shaft stands on an octagonal plinth on a base of three octagonal steps. At the base of the shaft are scrolled brackets. The memorial is set in a small garden, on a paved platform, and is approached from the road by a set of steps. The face of the plinth facing the road is inscribed "FOR OUR SAKE", the face to the left is inscribed "1914" and that to the right "1918". The top step is inscribed "1939–1945".

Behind the cross is a sandstone wall divided into five sections by six piers, each section containing a marble plaque. Each plaque carries an inscription and names of the 361 local servicemen who died in the First World War. On the piers are plaques containing the names of the 119 servicemen who died in the Second World War. The granite stone in front of the cross is inscribed with the names of those lost in later conflicts. (Note: As of September 2016 the stone contains seven names.)

== Appraisal ==
The memorial was designated as a Grade II listed building on 15 September 2016. Grade II is the lowest of the three grades of listing, and is applied to "buildings [that are] are of special interest". The reasons for designating this building are its historic interest "as an eloquent witness to the tragic impact of world events on the local community, and the sacrifice it has made in the conflicts of the 20th and 21st centuries"; and its architectural interest as being "a tall and imposing memorial cross standing on a wide platform designed for ceremonial use defined by a memorial wall to the rear".

== War Memorial Garden ==
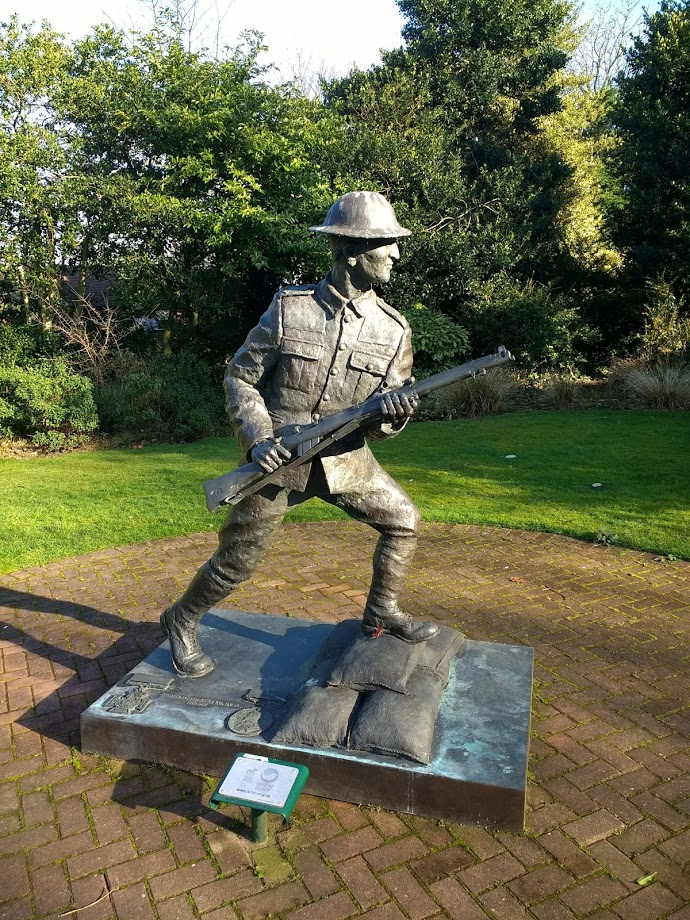
Statue of Thomas Alfred Jones

There is a memorial garden opposite the memorial cross. It has a statue of Thomas Alfred Jones, from Runcorn, who was awarded a Victoria Cross.

== See also ==
- Listed buildings in Runcorn (urban area)
