= John Alker =

British clockmaker

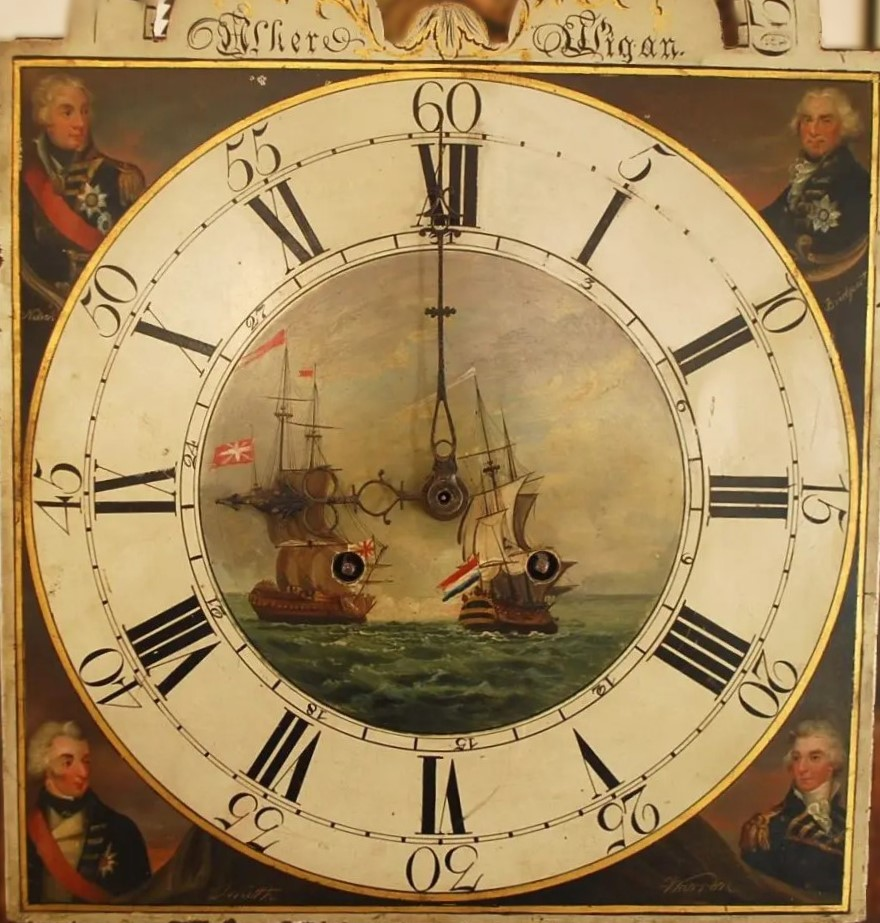
- Alker of Wigan clock c.1794
- Born: 15 April 1775; Wigan, Lancashire
- Died: July 1850 (aged 75); Wigan, Lancashire
- Occupations: Clock and watch maker
- Writing career
- Years active: 1794-1832

John Alker (1775–1850) or simply Alker of Wigan, was a long case clock and pocket watch maker and member of the Worshipful Company of Clockmakers active in Wigan, Lancashire.

== Life and career ==
John Alker, son of James Alker, was baptised on the 15th of April 1775 at All Saints' Church, Wigan. He was first recorded as a clockmaker in his marriage to Margaret Hickman in 1794. John and Margaret would go on to have six children together, with several also becoming reputed clock and watch makers, before her death of consumption in 1808.

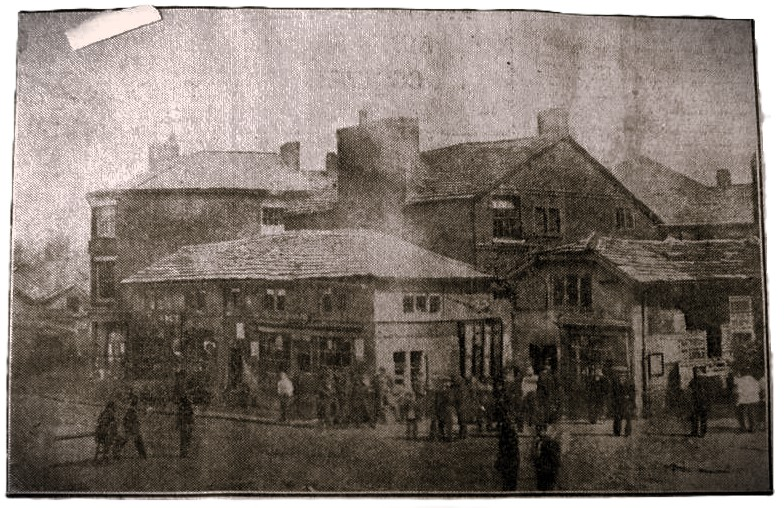
Market Place in 1860, depicting the former Alker store in the lower right.

From their storefront on Market Place in central Wigan, John and his family would craft intricate longcase clocks for use in the home and large turret clocks for public spaces. In 1813 he installed one such turret clock at St Wilfrid's Church in Ribchester.

John was described as having a preference for the newer fashions of his time, as shown through his use of painted dials. A number of his clocks survive, and frequently present features of special interest. One of his longcase clocks, dated to around 1830, was featured on Antiques Roadshow and valued between £7,000 and £10,000.

John died at his home in Scholes and was buried on the 14th July 1850 at All Saints' Church, Wigan.

== Legacy ==
John Alker began a legacy of clock and watch manufacturing within his family, spanning over 100 years. The original storefront in Wigan was in operation from at least 1794 to 1860, being run by John and subsequently his sons and extended family. Eventually expanding to a second store in Chorley that was active until the late 1800's.

- Thomas Alker (1794 - 1847) Son of John Alker. Clockmaker in Wigan.
- Nicholas Alker (1803 - 1871) Son of John Alker. Watchmaker in Wigan and Chorley.
- James Alker (1818 - 1889) Son of Thomas Alker. Clockmaker in Wigan and Chorley.
- John Alker (1819 - 1859) Son of Thomas Alker. Clockmaker in Wigan.
- Nicholas Alker (b. 1828) Son of Thomas Alker. Watch finisher in Chorley.

== Gallery ==
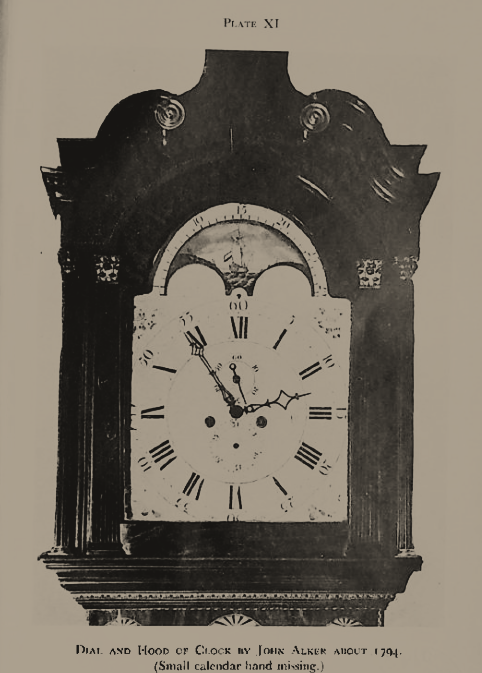
Dial and hood of clock by John Alker, c.1794.

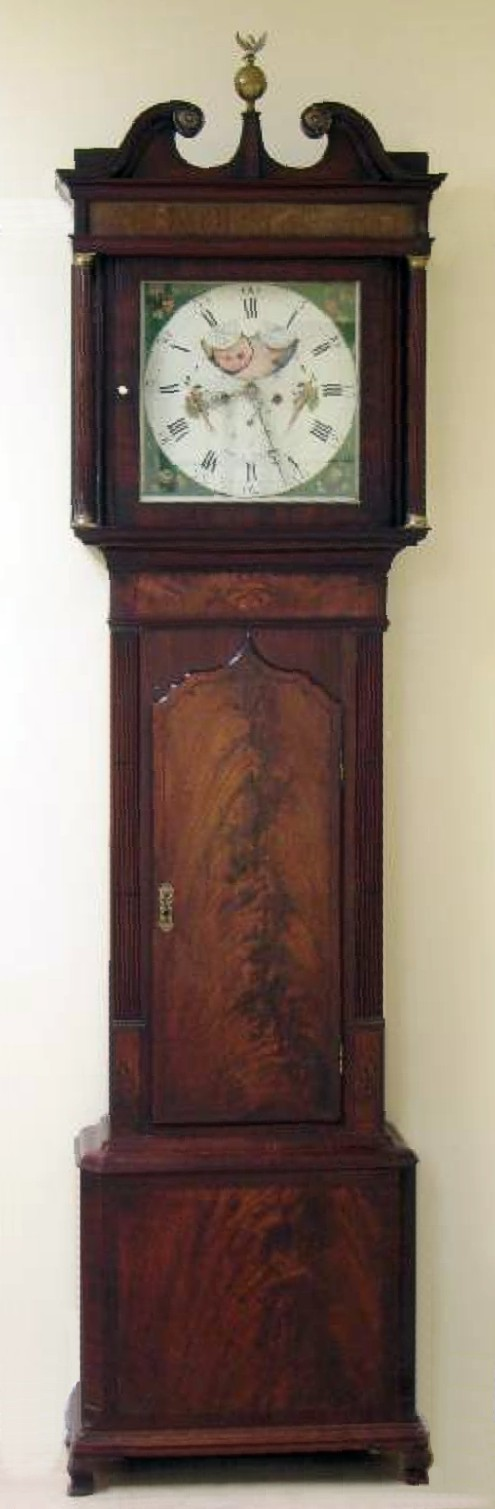
Mahogany longcase clock by John Alker, early 1800's.

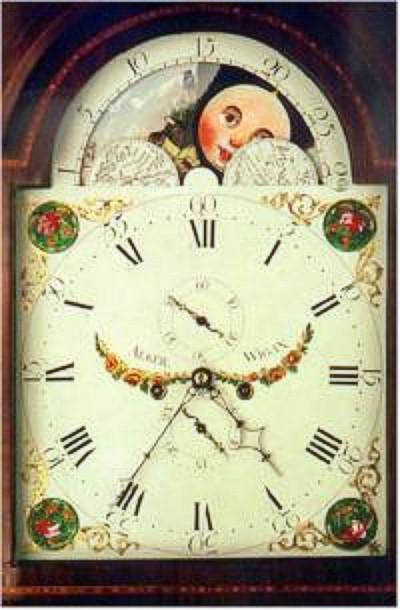
Example of John Alker's use of painted dials.

Signed John Alker pocket watch, early 1800's.
