= Millennium Forum =

Theatre and conference centre in Derry, Northern Ireland

Coordinates: 54.997°N 7.320°W

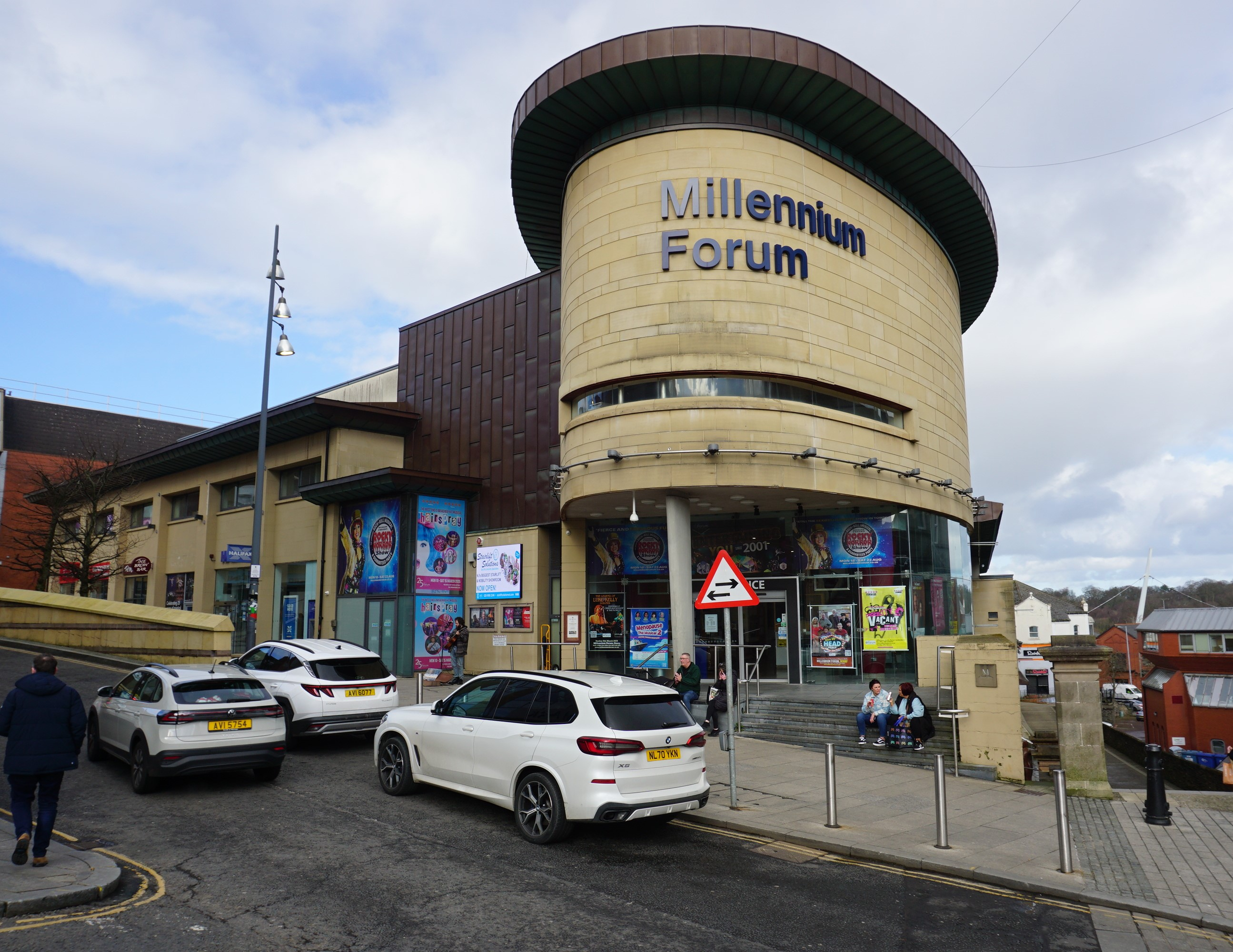
- Millennium Forum, February 2025
- Interactive map of Millennium Forum
- Address: Newmarket Street; Derry, BT48 6EB; Derry; Northern Ireland
- Owner: Public
- Capacity: 1,000
- Type: Concert hall Theatre; Conference hall
- Designation: Charity

Construction
- Opened: 2001
- Years active: 2001 – present

Website
- www.millenniumforum.co.uk

The Millennium Forum is a theatre and conference centre in Newmarket Street, Derry, Northern Ireland.

It was the first purpose-built theatre in Derry and opened in 2001. It has a seating capacity of 1,000 and one of the largest theatre stage in Ireland. It hosts entertainment of all kinds and can also be used as a meeting and conference venue.
