= Doris Lindner =

British artist (1896-1979

- Born: 8 July 1896; Llanyre, Wales
- Died: 1979 (aged 82–83); Maidstone, England
- Education: Calderon School of Animal Painting; Saint Martin's School of Art; British School in Rome
- Known for: Sculpture

Doris Lexley Margaret Lindner (8 July 1896 – 1979) was a British sculptor who specialised in creating figures of animals and birds.

== Biography ==
Lindner was born at Llanyre in mid-Wales, and spent her childhood in Winchester. Her mother was Welsh and her father was English and the family had sufficient income to employ several servants. Lindner studied at the school of animal painting run by William Frank Calderon in London and then at Saint Martin's School of Art in central London before completing her studies at the British School in Rome.

Lindner specialised in creating figures of birds and animals in stone, plaster, bronze and concrete and many were reproduced in porcelain by Royal Worcester. She also created an equestrian statuette in bronze of Princess Elizabeth which was reproduced in a porcelain limited edition by Royal Worcester and also as a life-size model which was displayed in Selfridges in London as part of the store's 1953 Coronation celebrations. Lindner was a regular exhibitor at the Royal Academy in London, with the Royal Glasgow Institute of the Fine Arts, with the Royal Society of British Sculptors and at the Leicester Galleries. She also exhibited with the London Group and the Royal Society of British Artists.

For most of her career Lindner lived in London but later lived in both Gloucestershire and at Addlestone in Sussex and died at Maidstone in Kent.
