= Louis Aucoc =

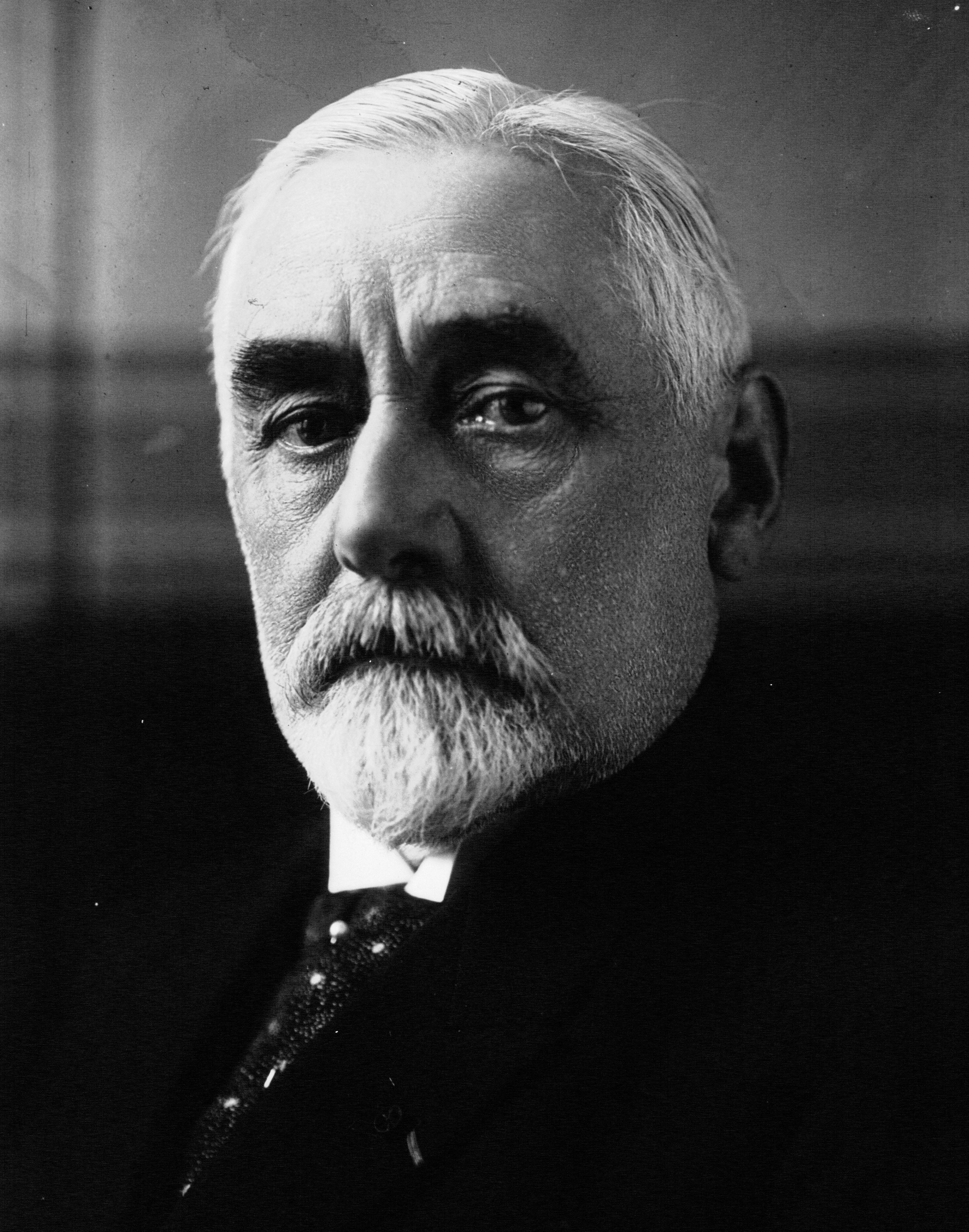
- Born: September 21, 1850; Paris, France
- Died: December 10, 1932 (aged 82); Paris, France
- Occupation(s): Jeweler and goldsmith

Louis Aucoc (21 September 1850 Paris – 10 December 1932 Paris), was a leading Parisian Art Nouveau jeweller and goldsmith, working with his father and brother André.

== Biography ==
The Aucoc family firm at 6 Rue de la Paix was established in Paris in 1821 and was patronised by the house of King Louis Philippe, the House of Orléans, Napoleon III and Empress Eugenie. The shop is mentioned in the first chapter of The Lady of the Camellias (French: La Dame aux camélias, published in 1848).

From 1874 to 1876, René Lalique was an apprentice to Aucoc. Lalique would later become a defining figure in the art nouveau movement.

The business left the hands of the Aucoc family in 1932.

Louis Aucoc married Micheline Louise Isaiah Rondeleux on 4 June 1872 and had three children - Georges who will marry the actress Odette Talazac, René and a daughter Marie Louise who married André la Ferté. LGBTQ+ activist Fabrice Houdart is the great grandson of their daughter Simone la Ferté.

Examples of Louis Aucoc's work
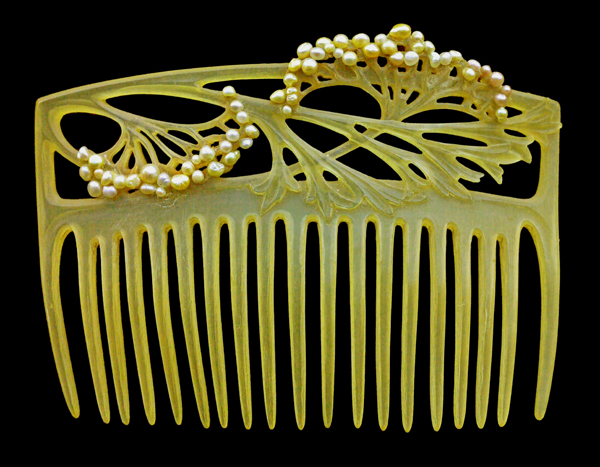
Carved horn decorated with seed pearls c1905

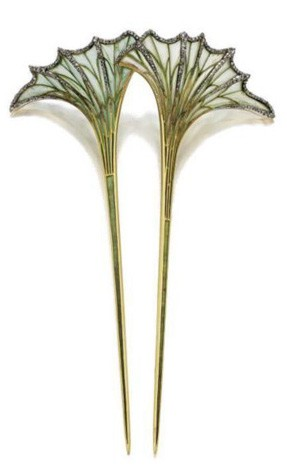
Plique-à-jour enamel with small rose-cut diamonds in the veins c1900

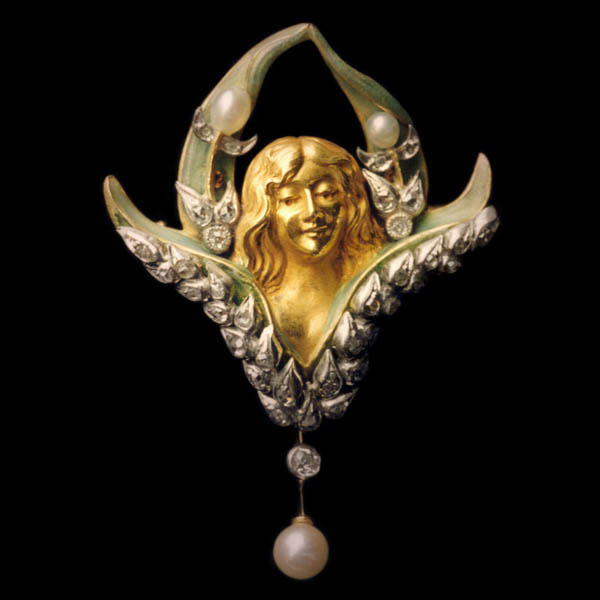
‘Flora’, Art Nouveau brooch
