= William Heaton Cooper =

English painter (1903–1995)

William Heaton Cooper RA (6 October 1903–1995) was an English impressionistic landscape artist who worked predominantly in watercolours, most famous for his paintings of the Lake District. Since the 1950s, he has become known as one of the most celebrated British landscape artists of the 20th century.

== Life ==
Heaton Cooper was born in Coniston, Lancashire, in the English Lake District in 1903, the third child to a Norwegian mother, Mathilde, and the landscape artist Alfred Heaton Cooper.

William Heaton Cooper was strongly influenced by his father's artistic style. Alfred lived entirely by his painting and William soon aspired to follow in his father's footsteps. He gained a scholarship to the Royal Academy School in London and subsequently exhibited at the Royal Academy, with the Royal Society of British Artists and the Royal Institute. Alongside his painting, he became an authority on the lore and landscape of the Lake District, walking and rock climbing in its mountains with the pioneer climbers of the 1920s. He was noted for his knowledge of the Lakeland fells, their structure and their geography. This knowledge is apparent from his illustration of the rock climbing guides published by the Fell & Rock Climbing Club, of which he was elected life president.

In 1953, he was elected to membership of the Royal Institute of British Watercolourists and was for eleven years president of the Lake Artists Society. At the time of his father's death in 1929, William was living in the south of England in an experimental commune, which was home to a variety of people with artistic talents and was a source of inspiration for him. Heaton Cooper left the south to take over the studio in Ambleside which his father had built, in order to provide for his mother and younger sister. A period of intense unhappiness followed, during which a search for inner peace and integrity led him on a religious quest, culminating in his adoption of the doctrines of the Oxford Movement. The strength of his sincere belief in the tenets of this movement led him to ignore the more contentious side of its dogma. He decided that he would hand over control of his whole life to God. He claimed that this included a commitment even to give up painting if God so wished. He remained convinced that this decision enabled him to find it in himself to love and always referred to the moment as his 'release'.

His painting continued to improve, so much so that he soon eclipsed the reputation of his father. A decision was taken to move the studio business to Grasmere, and the building of a home and studio there began in 1938. In the same year, he met the sculptor Ophelia Gordon Bell, who in 1940 became his wife.

William died in 1995 and is buried in Grasmere. Obituaries in the Times, Guardian and Daily Telegraph paid tribute to his outstanding contribution to landscape art.
