= Agathon Léonard =

French sculptor

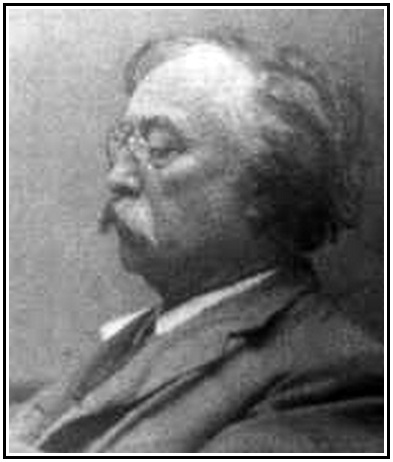
Photograph of Léonard Agathon van Weijdeveld

"Tragic Pose from Le Jeu de l'escharpe" by Léonard

Agathon Léonard or Léonard Agathon van Weydevelt (1841 Lille - 1923 Paris), was a French Art Nouveau sculptor.

Léonard moved to Paris when quite young and studied sculpture at the Ecole des Beaux-Arts de Paris under Eugène Delaplanche. He became a member of the Société des Artistes Français in 1887 and a member of the Société Nationale des Beaux-Arts in 1897. He regularly exhibited across France, and was made a chevalier of the Légion d'Honneur in 1900. Some of his best-known works are studies of dancers, such as La Cothurne (Tragic Pose from Le Jeu de l'escharpe), modeled in 1895 and cast in 1900. The Play of the Scarf, executed in a characteristic fin-de-siècle manner and rendered in gilt, showed a dancer in a flowing gown with a billowing scarf held above her head. This piece was produced in 1897, was inspired by the renowned dancer, Loie Fuller and was displayed as a table centerpiece at the 1900 World's Fair at the Pavillon de Sèvres in Paris.

Bronze casting of Léonard's work was carried out by the Susse Frères Editeurs foundry. Besides bronze, he also produced works in marble, quartz and ivory. His bas-relief of St. Cecilia is to be found in the Abbeville Museum and the Nantes Museum houses a bust titled The Plunderer of Shipwrecks.

Léonard also produced Art Nouveau medallions, statuettes and pottery.
