= Thomas Alfred Jones =

Recipient of the Victoria Cross (1880–1956)

Thomas Alfred Jones VC DCM
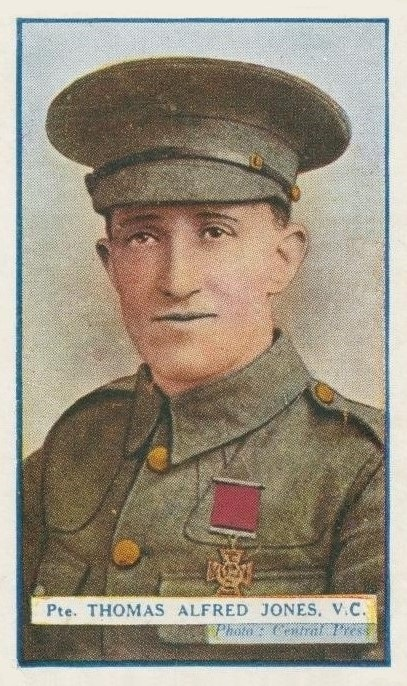
- Jones depicted on a cigarette card
- Born: 25 December 1880; Runcorn, Cheshire, England
- Died: 30 January 1956 (aged 75); Runcorn, Cheshire, England
- Burial place: Runcorn Cemetery
- Military career
- Allegiance: United Kingdom
- Branch: British Army
- Rank: Private
- Nickname: "Todger"
- Service number: 11000
- Unit: Cheshire Regiment
- Conflicts: World War I
- Awards: Victoria Cross; Distinguished Conduct Medal; Territorial Efficiency Medal

Thomas Alfred Jones, VC, DCM (25 December 1880 – 30 January 1956), also known as "Todger" Jones, was an English recipient of the Victoria Cross, the highest award for gallantry in the face of the enemy awarded to British and Commonwealth forces. There is a statue of Jones at Runcorn War Memorial.

== Biography ==
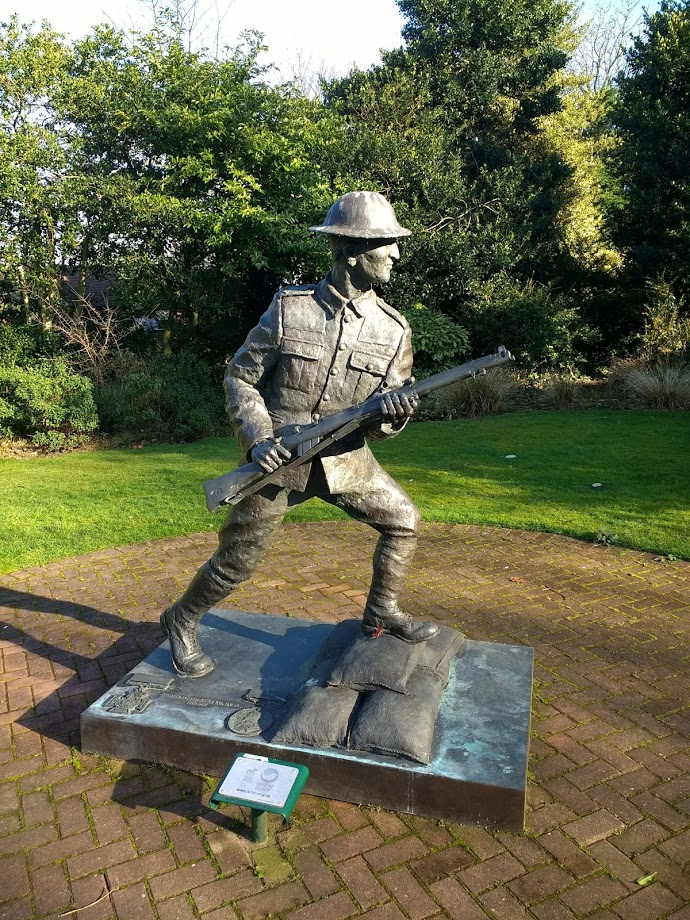
Statue of "Todger" Jones in Runcorn Memorial Garden

Jones was born in Runcorn, Cheshire, on 25 December (Christmas Day) 1880. He was a private in the 1st Battalion, The Cheshire Regiment, British Army during the First World War. He was known affectionately locally as "Todger" Jones.

He was 35 years old when on 25 September 1916, during the Battle of Morval, Jones performed an act of bravery for which he was awarded the Victoria Cross. He was with his company covering the advance in front of a village, when he noticed an enemy sniper 200 yards (183 m) away. He left his trench on his own, and crossed no man's land without covering fire. Although one bullet went through his helmet and another through his coat, he returned the sniper's fire and killed him. Near the enemy trench, he saw two more Germans firing on him while simultaneously displaying a white flag. Jones shot them both. Upon reaching the enemy trench, he found several occupied dug-outs and single-handedly disarmed 102 Germans. Three or four were officers, and the entire trench was taken by Jones and his comrades.

While still serving with the 1st Cheshires, in September 1918 he won the Distinguished Conduct Medal (DCM) for his actions near Bapaume when he "went forward five times with messages through an intense barrage [and] led forward stragglers and placed them in positions. His fine example and utter fearlessness of danger were a great incentive to the men."

Jones continued to live in Runcorn and died on 30 January 1956, aged 75. He is buried in Runcorn Cemetery. His Victoria Cross medal group is displayed at the Cheshire Military Museum in Chester.

== Statue ==
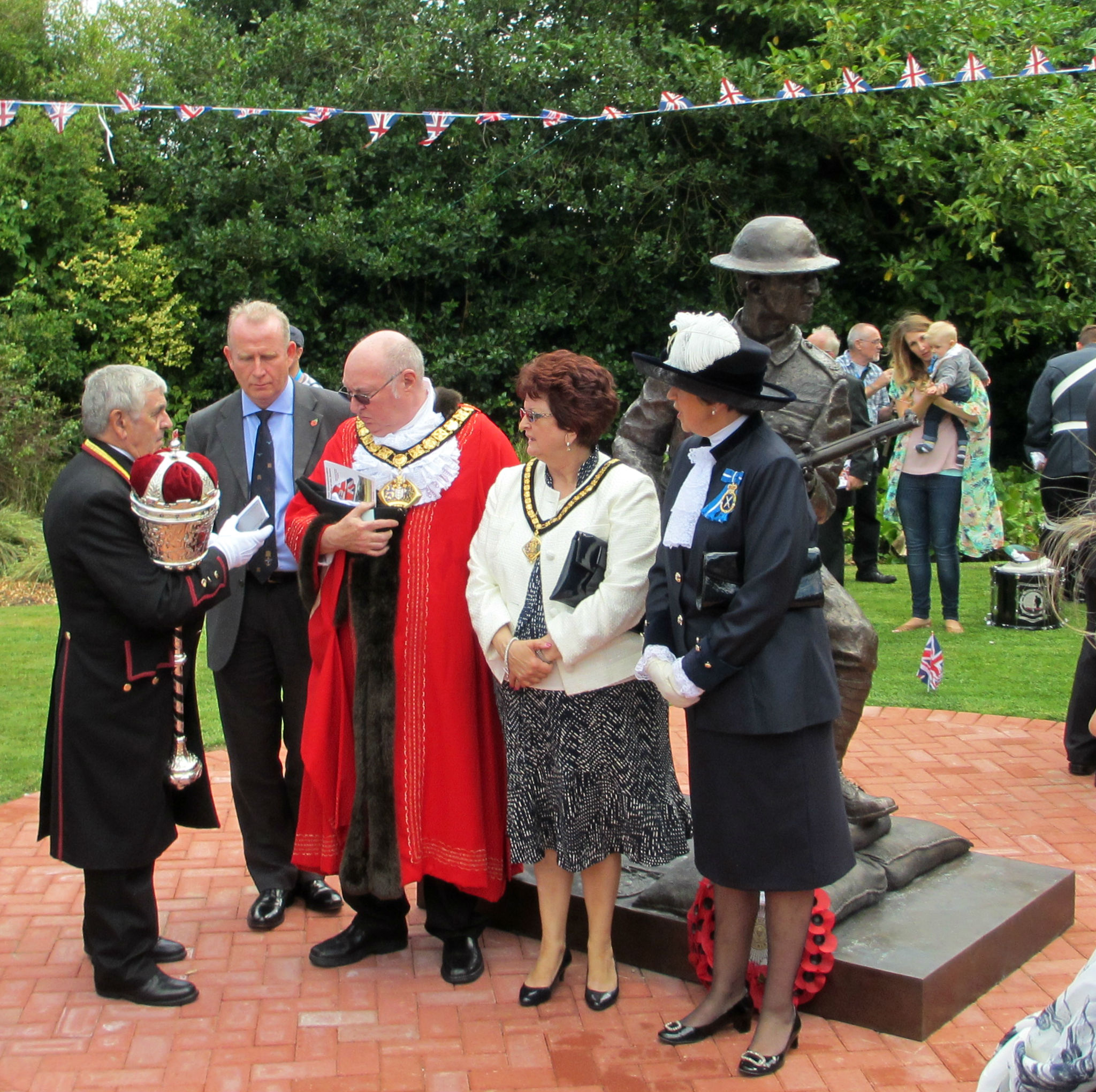
Dignitaries in front of the statue following unveiling

On 3 August 2014 a bronze statue of Jones was unveiled in the Memorial Garden, Runcorn. Following a ceremony in front of the War Memorial opposite to the garden, the statue was unveiled by four veterans and active servicemen. It was created by the Scottish sculptor David Annand.

== Honours ==
Thomas Jones' full medal entitlement was as follows.

Ribbon	Description	Notes
	Victoria Cross (VC)	26 October 1916
	Distinguished Conduct Medal (DCM)	9 December 1918
	1914–15 Star	
	British War Medal	
	Victory Medal	
	Defence Medal	
	King George VI Coronation Medal	12 May 1937; Qualified as a VC recipient
	Queen Elizabeth II Coronation Medal	2 June 1953; Qualified as a VC recipient
	Territorial Force Efficiency Medal	1912

== Bibliography ==
- Gliddon, Gerald (2011) [1991]. Somme 1916. VCs of the First World War. The History Press. ISBN 978-0-7524-6303-2.
- Thompson, Dave (2002), I Laughed Like Blazes: The Life of Private Thomas 'Todger' Jones, VC, DCM, Dave Thompson, ISBN 0954262905
