= Trench art =

Art genre related to armed conflict

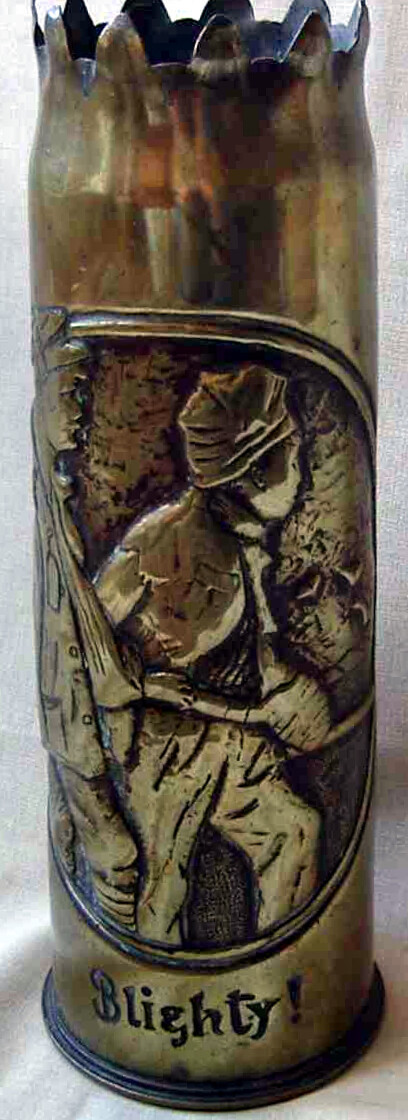
A shell case embossed with an image of two wounded Tommies approaching the White Cliffs of Dover

Trench art is any decorative item made by soldiers, prisoners of war, or civilians where the manufacture is directly linked to armed conflict or its consequences. It offers an insight not only into their feelings and emotions about the war, but also their surroundings and the materials they had available to them. It is controversial whether items made of body parts can be considered trench art, such as a letter-opener made from an arm bone, which was gifted to Franklin Roosevelt.

Not limited to the World Wars, the history of trench art spans conflicts from the Napoleonic Wars to the present day. Although the practice flourished during World War I, the term 'trench art' is also used to describe souvenirs manufactured by service personnel during World War II. Some items manufactured by soldiers, prisoners of war or civilians during earlier conflicts have been retrospectively described as trench art.

== Categorisation ==
There are four broad categories of trench art:

=== Items made by soldiers ===
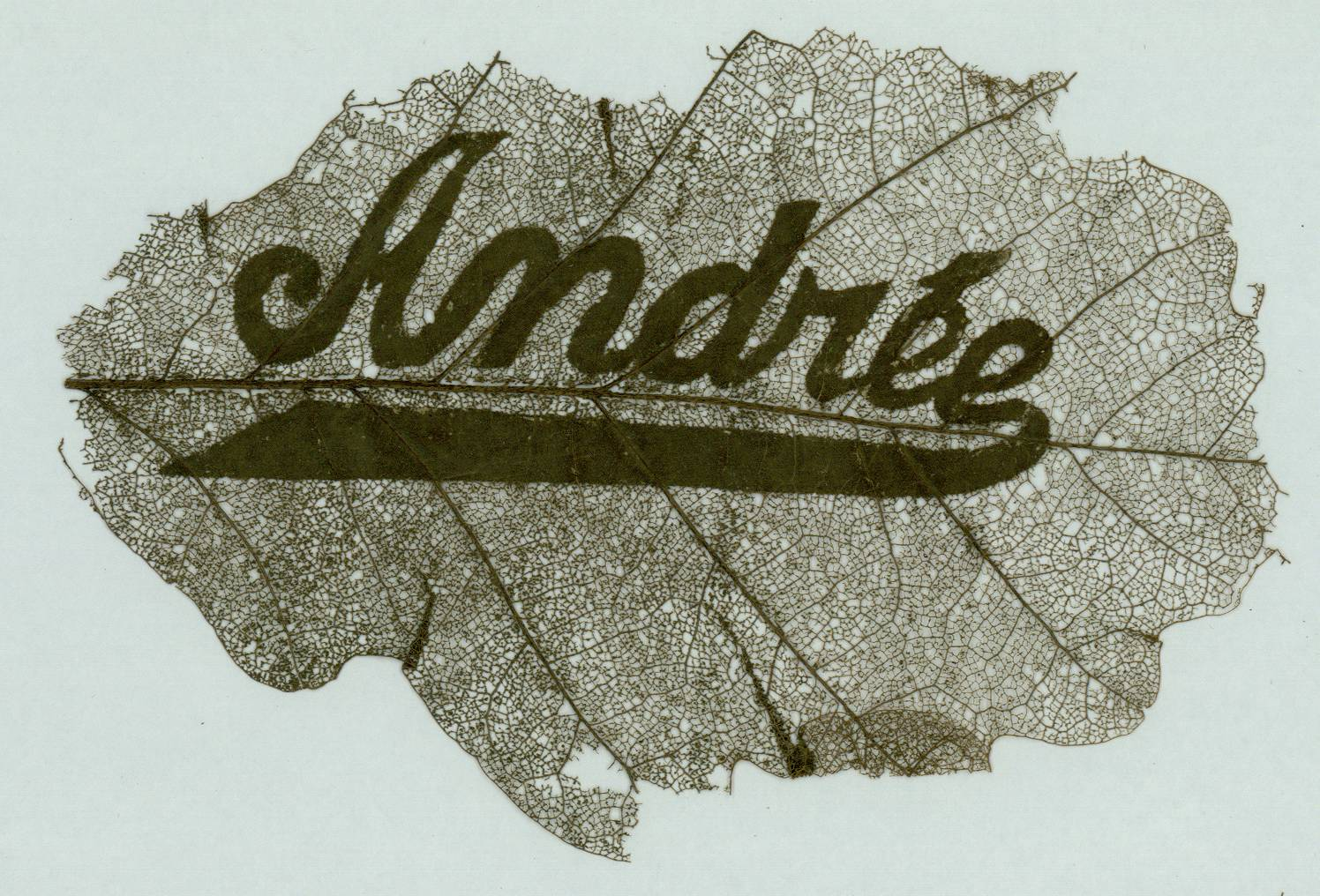
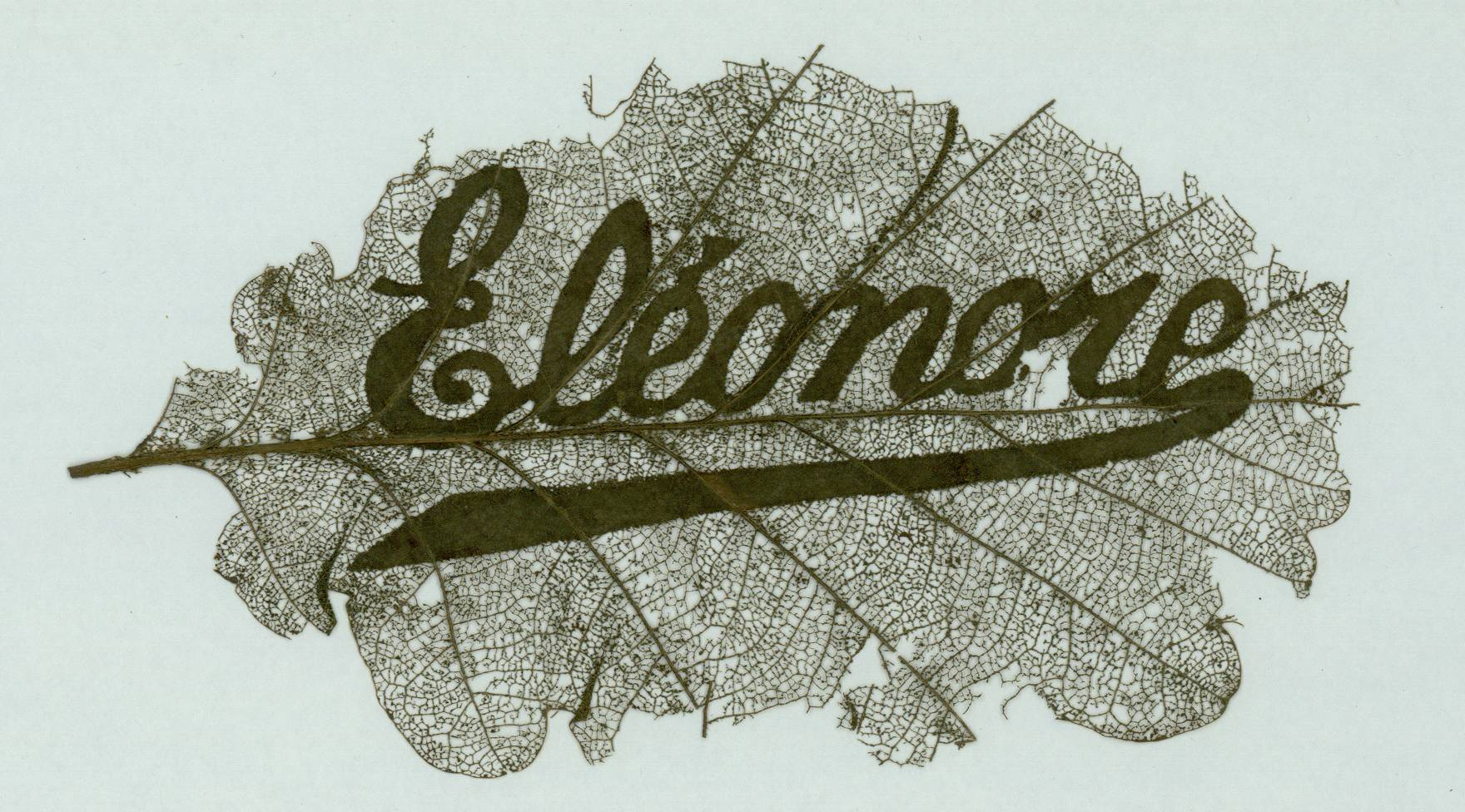
Two chestnut leaves, engraved by a French soldier with the names of his children "Andrée" and "Eléonore" while waiting in the trenches.

The first category consists of items made by soldiers. There is much evidence to prove that some trench art was made in the trenches, by soldiers, during war.

According to George Coppard, he would press his uniform buttons into the clay floor of his trench, then pour molten lead from shrapnel into the impressions to cast replicas of the regimental crest. Coppard has also said that, while recuperating from wounds at a private house in Birkenhead, "one kind old lady brought a supply of coloured silks and canvas and instructed us in the art of embroidery. A sampler which I produced under her guidance so pleased her that she had it framed for me."

Chalk carvings were also popular, with contemporary postcards showing carvings in the rocky outcrops of dug-outs.

Wounded soldiers were encouraged to work at crafts as part of their recuperation, with embroidery and simple forms of woodwork being common. Many smaller items such as rings and knives were made by soldiers either in front line or support trenches, especially in quieter parts of the line.

An example of therapeutic embroidery during World War I is the work of British military in Egypt, who were photographed sewing and embroidering for Syrian refugees. There was also the Bradford Khaki Handicrafts Club, which was funded in Bradford, UK, in 1918, to provide occupational therapy and employment for men returning from the trenches in France.

=== Items made by POWs and internees ===
The second category consists of items made by prisoners of war and interned civilians.

POWs had good reasons to make decorative objects: free time and limited resources. Much POW work was therefore done with the express intention of trading the finished article for food, money or other privileges.

According to A.B. Baker, W.A.A.C., "Part of my work had to do with prisoners quartered in a camp near to our own. Those Germans were friendly men. They were clever with their hands, and would give me little carvings which they had made."

=== Items made by civilians ===
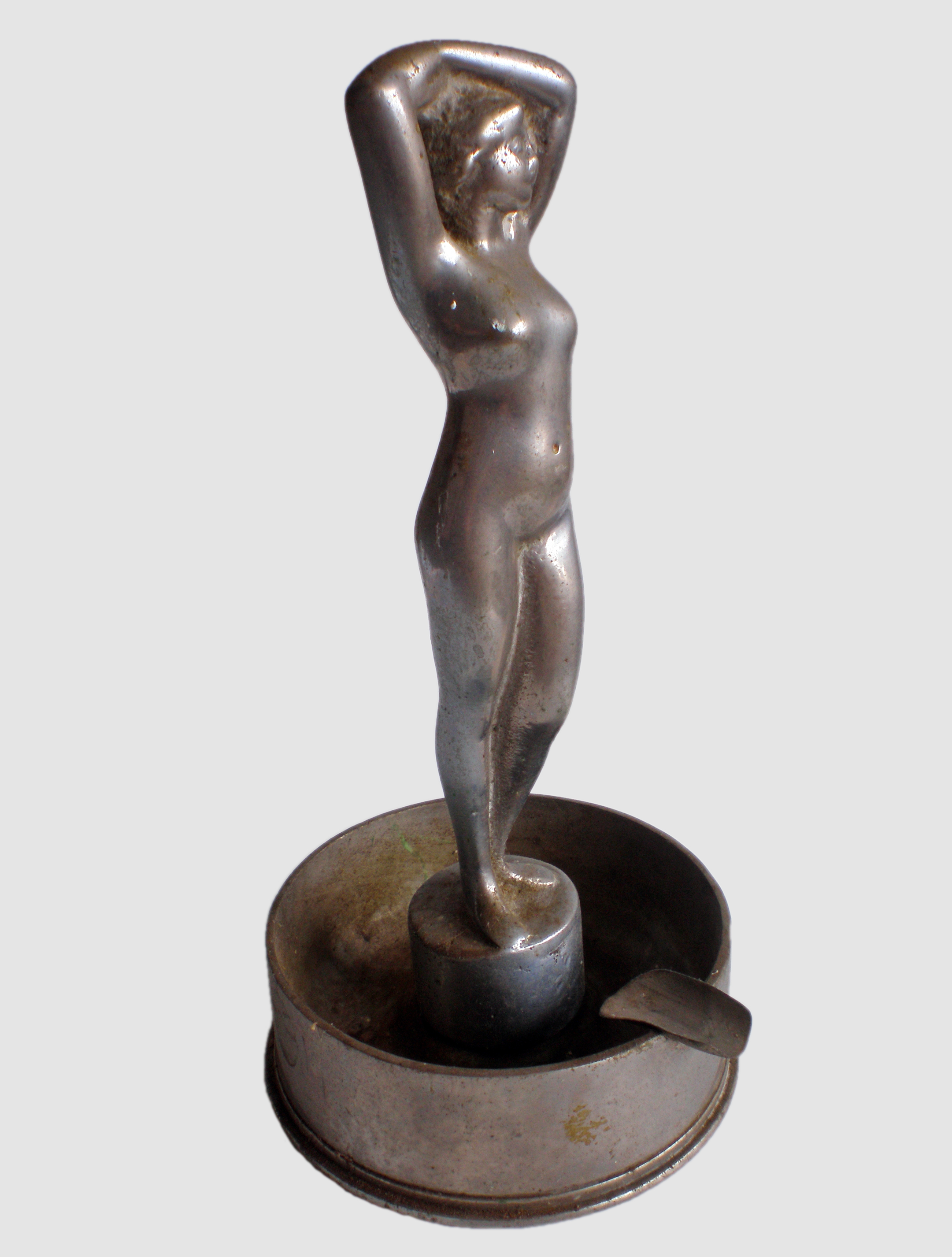
Chromed metal trench art ashtray made from a 25 pounder shell casing, 1942

The third category is items made by civilians, which mainly means civilians in and around the conflict zone, but would also include items made by sweethearts at home.

In 1914, the US set up the Commission for Relief in Belgium, headed by Herbert Hoover. It shipped staple foodstuffs, mainly flour, in the printed cotton flour sacks typical of the period. As thanks, the Belgians would embroider and paint in the designs, elaborating them with dates and flags and send them back to the US. Examples of these are now in the Herbert Hoover Museum, but some were sold to soldiers in Paris or given as gifts.

Civilians in France, in the zones occupied by troops, were quick to exploit a new market. Embroidered postcards were produced in what quickly became a cottage industry, with civilians buying the surrounds and embroidering a panel of gauze. These postcards depicted regimental crests or patriotic flags and national symbols in abundance, and millions were produced over the course of the war.

At war's end, when civilians began to reclaim their shattered communities, a new market appeared in the form of pilgrims and tourists. Over the ensuing twenty years mountains of discarded debris, shell casings, and castoff equipment were slowly recycled, with mass-produced town crest motifs being stuck onto bullets, shell casings, fuse caps, and other paraphernalia to be sold to tourists.

=== Commercial items ===
The fourth category is purely commercial production. After the war, tonnes of surplus materials were sold by the government and converted to souvenirs of the conflict.

Ship breaking, particularly if the ship had been involved in significant events such as the Battle of Jutland, resulted in much of the wood from the ship being turned into miniature barrels, letter racks, and boxes, with small brass plaques attached announcing, for example, "Made of teak from HMS Shipsname, which fought at the Battle of Jutland".

== Gallery ==
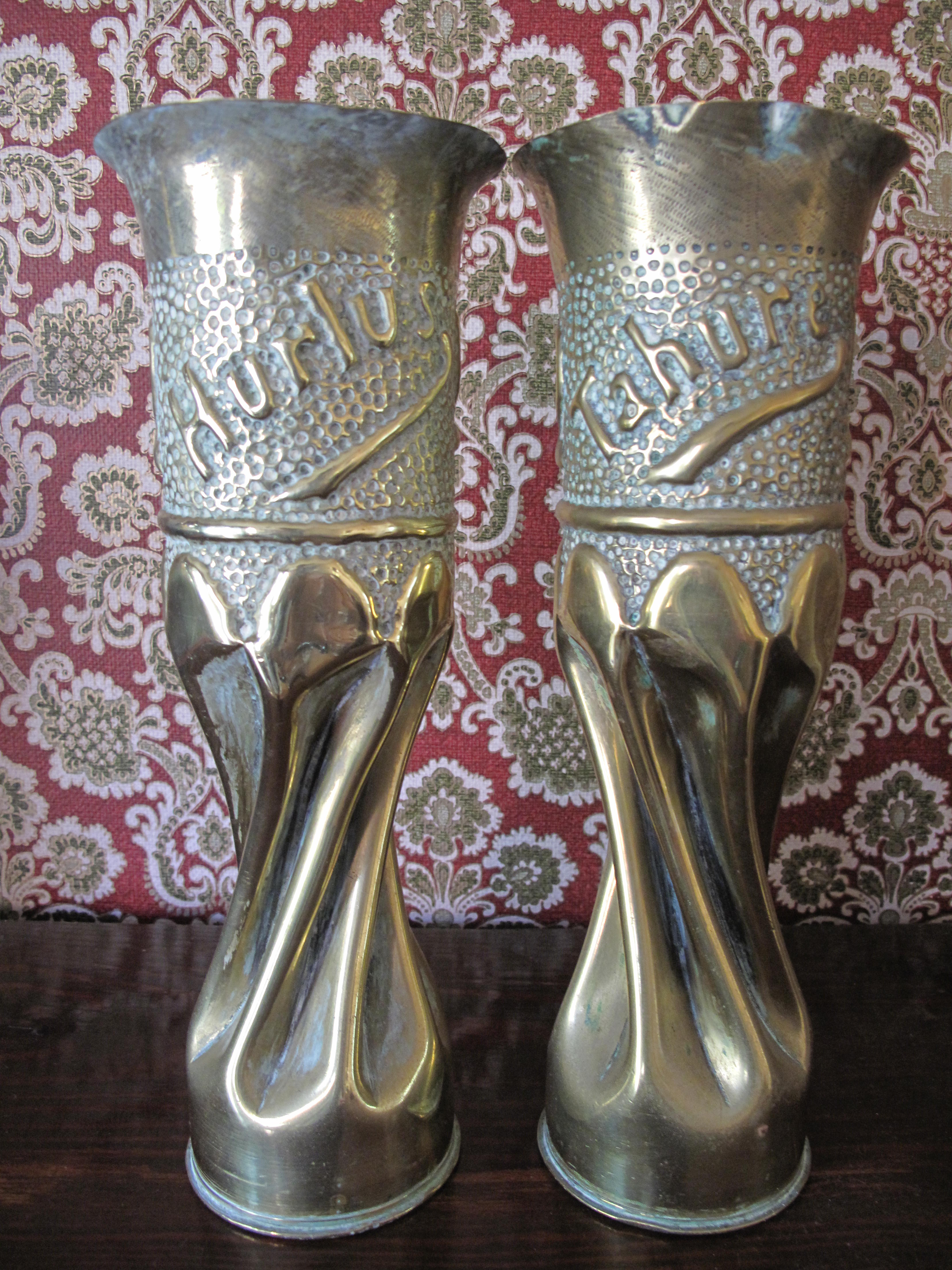
Pair of shell cases with the names of two French villages totally destroyed and never rebuilt

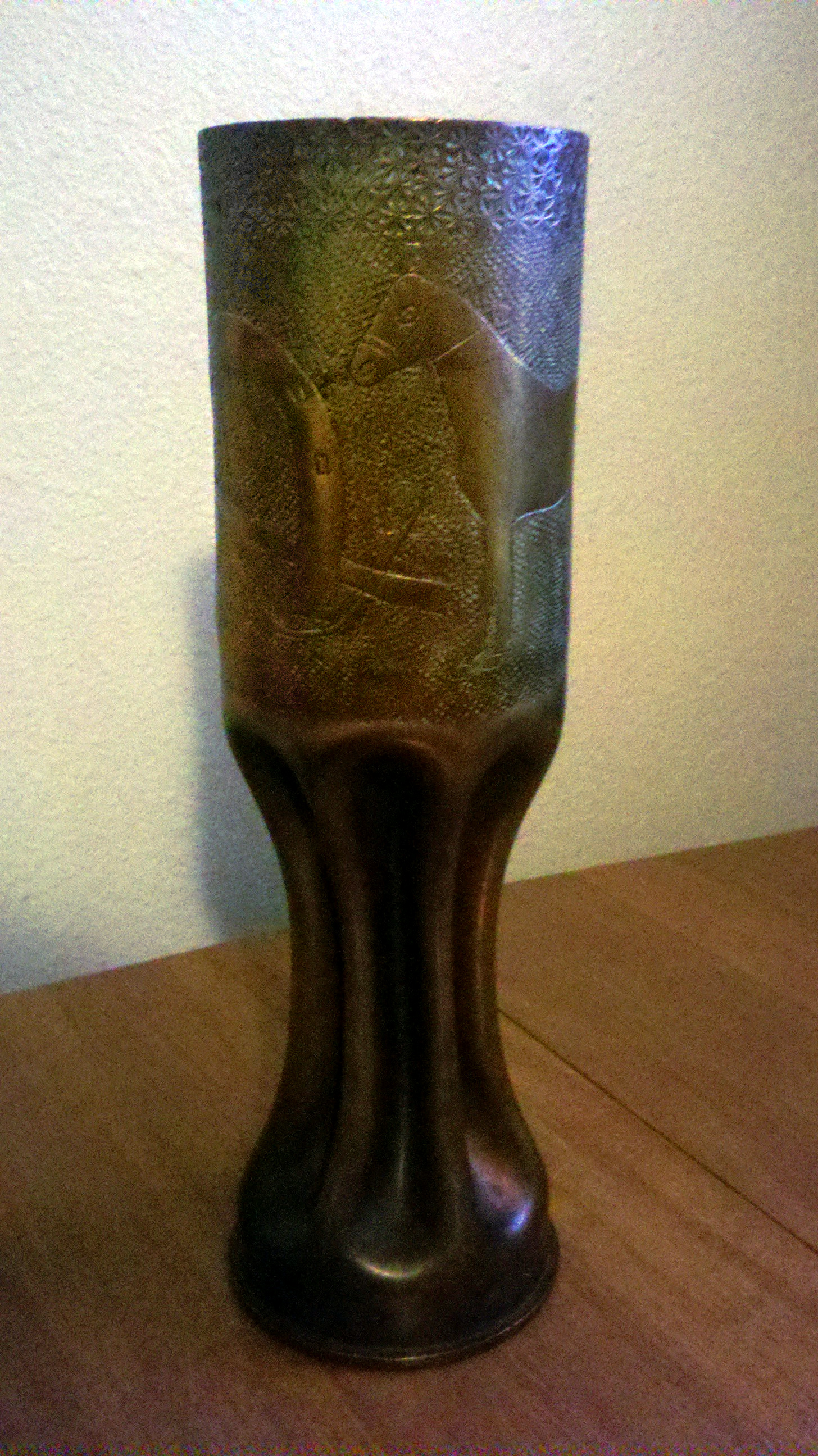
WWI trench art with etchings of a horse and horse shoes on an 80 mm shell casing.

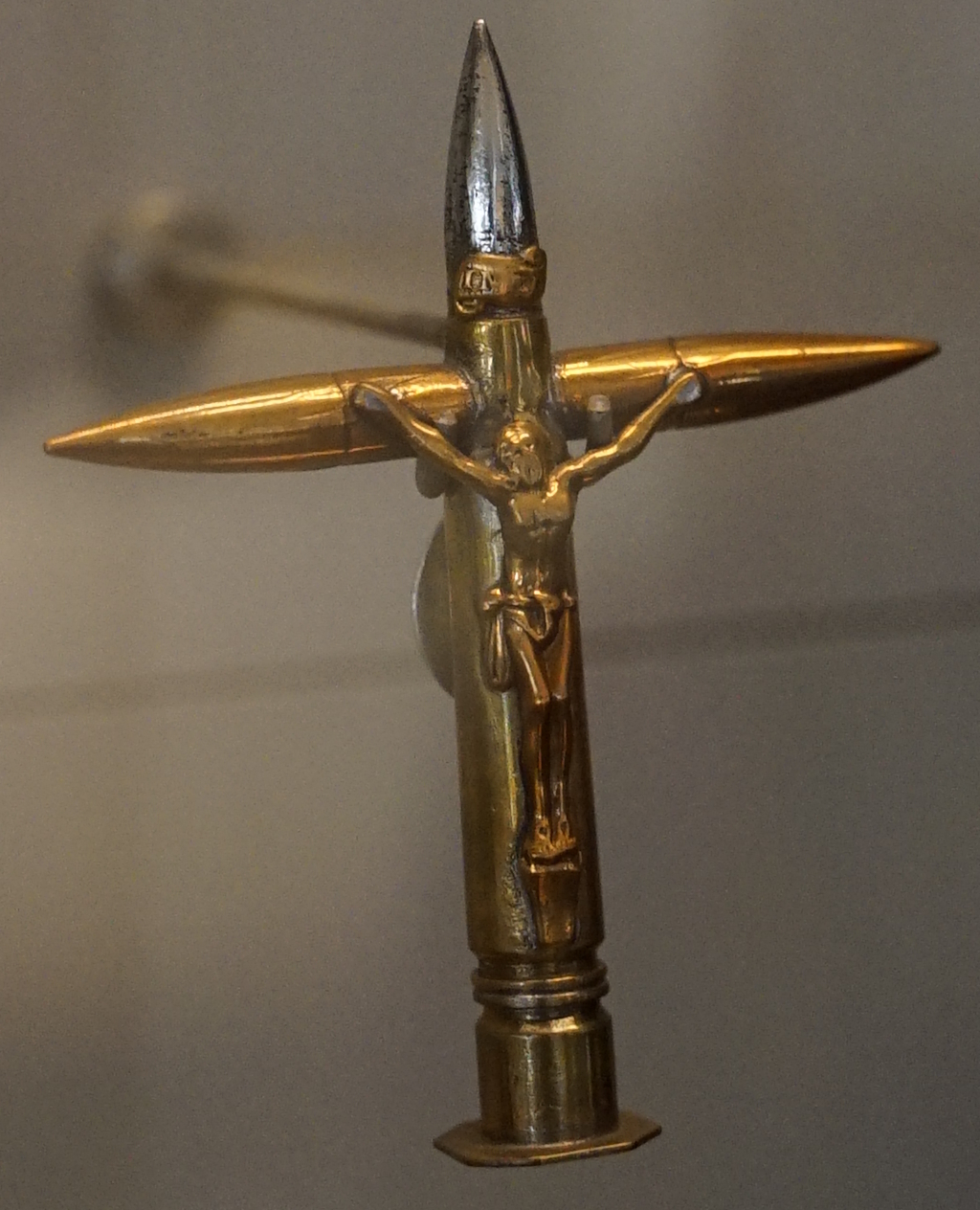
A crucifix made of bullet casings from the Army Museum (Paris).

== See also ==
- Stanley Pearl
- Outsider art
- Visual arts and design
