= Alfred Heaton Cooper =

English watercolour artist

Alfred Heaton Cooper (1863–1929) was an English watercolour artist. He is known for his landscapes of the English Lake District and Norway, and for illustrating several travel guidebooks.

== Life and work ==
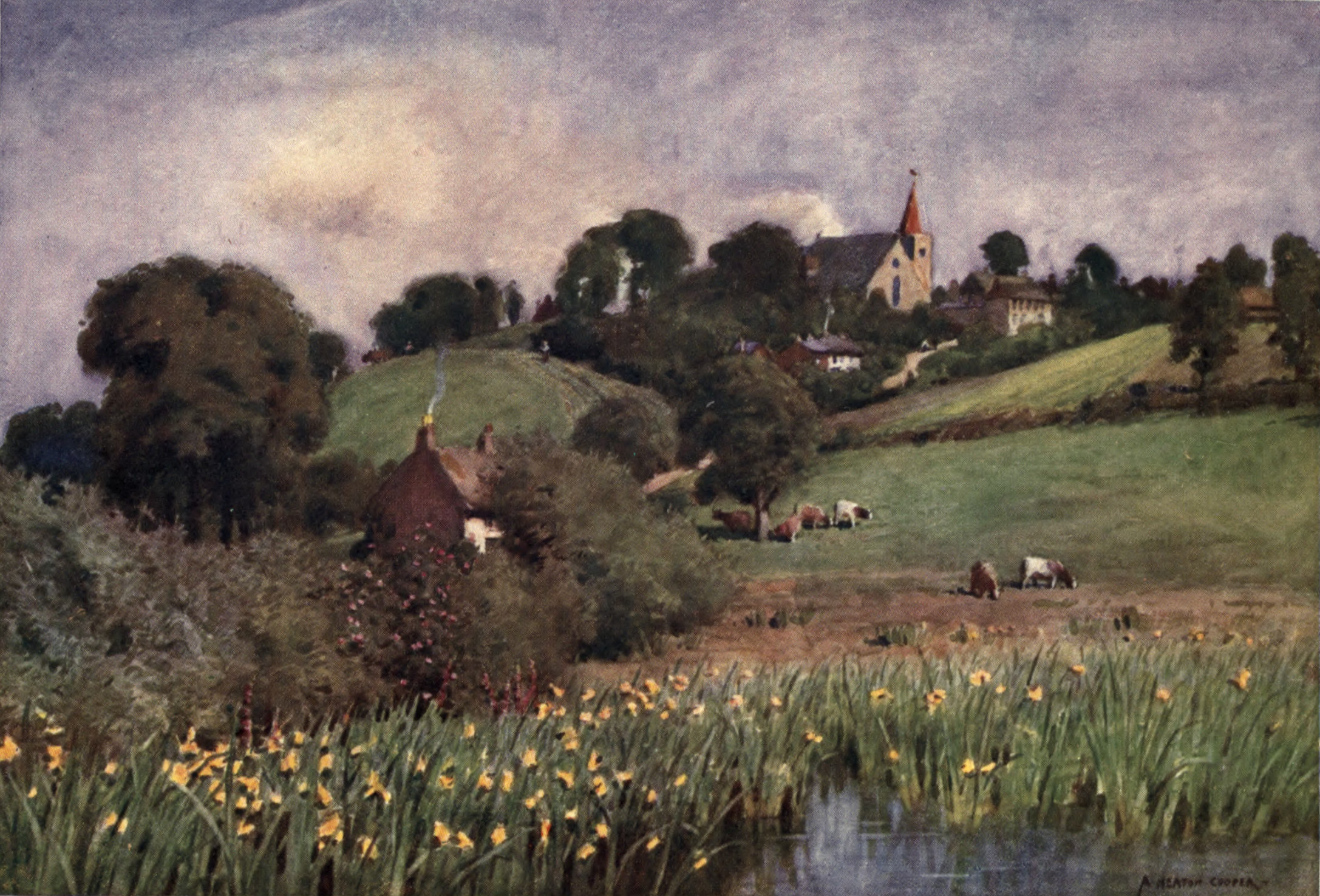
New Church in Ryde, Isle of Wight, 1908

Cooper was born in Halliwell, Bolton, Lancashire, England - one of six children to millworker parents - and brought up in the same place. After leaving school, he worked as a clerk but moved to London in 1884 to study art under George Clausen. He finished his studies prematurely to embark on a period of travelling, first north to Yorkshire, then abroad to Morocco and finally settling in Norway. Whilst in Norway, he became fascinated by the rural lifestyle of the Sogne region, where he eventually set up a studio beside the fjord at Balestrand. There, he married Mathilde.

After realising that he could not make a living in the area, he returned in 1894 to Bolton, moving eventually to the Lake District where he believed there was a market for his work amongst visiting tourists. He shipped his log cabin studio from Norway to Coniston and later to Ambleside. In 1903, Mathilde gave birth to William Heaton Cooper, who would also go on to become a landscape artist.

Apart from his watercolours of the Lake District, and scenes of Norwegian fjords (especially Balestrand), Cooper also provided illustrations for several travel guidebooks published by A & C Black.

He died in the Lake District in 1929. The family business he founded still exists today as an art gallery and shop, the Heaton Cooper Studio, in Grasmere, Cumbria.

== Selected Books illustrated by Heaton Cooper ==
- W. T. Palmer The English Lakes (A & C Black, 1905).
- A. R. Hope Moncrieff. The Isle of Wight (A & C Black, 1908)
- G. E. Mitton. The Isle of Wight (A. & C. Black, 1911).
- F. J. Mathew. Ireland (A. & C. Black, 1916).
- W. G. Clark. Norfolk & Suffolk (A & C Black, 1921).
- Mackenzie Macbride. Wild Lakeland (A & C Black, 1922).
- S. C. Hammer. Norway. (A & C Black, 1928).
