= List of exhibitions at York Art Gallery =

This is a list of exhibitions which have taken place at York Art Gallery organised chronologically.

== 2002 ==
- "White Gold" (September 2002-November 2002). An exhibition including works by Arne Ase, Astrid Gerhantz, and Horst Gobbels.
- "Smoked" (November 2002-January 2003).

== 2009 ==
- "3 Collectors: Gallery of Pots" (10 September 2009 – 9 May 2010). An exhibition of decorative arts by Bill Ismay, Eric Milner-White, and Henry Rothschild.

== 2011 ==
- Bigger Trees Near Warter by David Hockney (10 February 2011 – 22 June 2011).
- "William Etty – Art and Controversy" (25 June 2011 – 22 January 2012)
- "Excitations" (15 October 2011 – 31 December 2012) was an exhibition of ceramics chosen by Gordon Baldwin.

== 2012 ==
- "Gordon Baldwin – Objects for a Landscape" (11 February 2011 – 10 June 2012).
- "Art & Music" (23 June 2012 – 31 December 2012)

== 2015 ==
The restoration of York Art Gallery in 2013–2015 created several new gallery spaces, including the Burton Gallery and the Centre of Ceramic Art (CoCA).

- The Burton Gallery is a permanent exhibition gallery including works by Edward Matthew Ward, L. S. Lowry, and William Etty.
- "History of British Studio Pottery" (opened 2015). This is the permanent exhibition in the CoCA gallery.
- "Manifest: 10,000 Hours". An installation by Clare Twomey in the CoCA Gallery of 10,000 slipware bowls cast by members of the public.
- "Production Line" by Phoebe Cummings.
- "The Lumber Room" (1 August 2015 – 7 May 2017). An exhibition by Mark Hearld displaying the artists' favourite objects in York Museums Trust collection and his artistic responses to them.

== 2016 ==
- "Truth and Memory: British Art of the First World War" (25 March 2016 – 4 September 2016). An exhibition in collaboration with the Imperial War Museum creating the largest exhibit of First World War art for in a century.
- "Flesh: Skin and Surface" (23 September 2016 – 19 March 2017). An exhibition on the representation of flesh.
- "Pathways of Patients" (9 December 2016 – 23 April 2017). An exhibition in the CoCA gallery by six artists commission by the University of York's Centre for Chronic Diseases and Disorders (C2D2) to highlights connections between art and science.

== 2017 ==
- "Albert Moore: Of Beauty & Aesthetics" (7 April 2017 – 1 October 2017). An exhibition of works by Albert Joseph Moore.
- "Kate Haywood – Hoard" (3 August 2017 – 3 December 2017). An exhibition by Kate Haywood in the CoCA gallery exploring the relationships between people and objects.
- "Ceramics from the Attenborough Collection" (28 July 2017 – 5 November 2017).
- "Paul Nash & the Uncanny Landscape" (20 October 2017 – 15 April 2018). An exhibition of works by Paul Nash.

== 2018 ==
- "Sara Radstone: More than Words" (5 January 2018 – 5 June 2018). An exhibition in the CoCA gallery of more than fifty works by Sara Radstone.
- "The Sea is the Limit" (4 May 2018 – 2 September 2018). An exhibition exploring the ideas of migration and national borders
- "Lucie Rie: Ceramics & Buttons" (22 June 2018 – 3 November 2019). An exhibition of small works by Lucie Rie.
- "Strata – Rock – Dust – Stars" (28 September 2018 – 25 November 2018). An exhibition of media and interactive art inspired by the William Smith map at the Yorkshire Museum.
- "The BFG in Pictures" (12 October 2018 – 24 February 2019). An exhibition of works by Quentin Blake to illustrate The BFG.
- "When All is Quiet: Kaiser Chiefs in Conversation with York Art Gallery" (14 December 2018 – 10 March 2019). An exhibition curated by the Kaiser Chiefs.

== 2019 ==
- "Ruskin, Turner & The Storm Cloud: watercolours and Drawings" (29 March 2019 – 23 June 2019). A partnership exhibition between York Art Gallery and Abbot Hall Art Gallery on works by John Ruskin and J. M. W. Turner.
- "Coast to Coast" (26 July 2019 – 26 July 2020).
- "Sounds like Her" (13 July 2019 – 15 September 2019), an exhibition by women artists on sound art curated by Christine Eyene.
- "THE NATIONAL GALLERY MASTERPIECE TOUR 2019" (13 July 2019 – 22 September 2019). An exhibition centred around the display of Nicolas Poussin's The Triumph of Pan.
- "Making a Masterpiece – Bouts and Beyond (1450–2020)" (11 October 2019–6 January 26, 2020).
- "Gillian Lowndes: At the Edge" (23 November 2019 – May 2020), an exhibition of ceramic works by Gillian Lowndes.

== 2020 ==
- "Harland Miller: York, So Good They Named it Once" (14 February 2020 – 31 May 2020), an exhibition of paintings by Harland Miller and the largest solo show of the artist to date.
- "Human Nature" (21 October 2020 – 24 January 2021), a digital arts exhibition hosted as part of York Mediale 2020. As a result of new restrictions in England due to the COVID-19 pandemic, the gallery was forced to close in November 2020 and the "Human Nature" exhibition was extended until May 2021.

== 2021 ==
- 'Grayson Perry: The Pre-therapy Years' (28 May 2021 – 5 September 2021), an exhibition in the Centre of Ceramic Art re-introducing works Perry made between 1982 and 1994.
- 'Pictures of the Floating World: Japanese Ukiyo-e Prints' (opened 28 May 2021), an exhibition featuring Ukiyo-e prints.
- 'Yorkshire Tea Ceremony' (30 October 2021 - Spring 2024), an exhibition of the collection of W. A. Ismay.

== 2022 ==
- A takeover of the gallery by Curious Arts was announced on 9 February. The takeover featured Drag Storytime and workshops in protest-poster making in support of LGBT History Month.
- 'Beyond Bloomsbury: Life, Love, and Legacy' (5 March 2022 – 5 June 2022), an exhibition in partnership with the National Portrait Gallery and Sheffield Galleries and Museums Trust explored the Bloomsbury Group.
- 'Sin' (7 October 2022 – 22 January 2023), an exhibition in partnership with the National Gallery exploring the concept of sin through art. The exhibition included classic works by Lucas Cranach the Elder and Rembrandt van Rijn, and contemporary works by Tracey Emin and Ron Mueck.
- 'Treasures from the Stores' (1 November 2022 - current), an exhibition of artworks that had not been on display before or not for a long time, including a 'Marilyn Monroe' by Andy Warhol.

== 2023 ==
- 'Marvellous and Mischievous: Literature's Young Rebels' (10 February 2023 – 4 June 2023), an exhibition from the British Library of more than forty books and artworks showcasing "rebels, outsiders and spirited survivors" from children's literature.*'Wall of Women' (opened 8 March 2023), a developing display space opened on International Women's Day celebrating women artists.
- 'Bloom' (23 June 2023 – 8 October 2023), an exhibition on floral art-works, paintings, and decorative art pieces. It highlights the work and landscape of York Museum Gardens.
- 'Drawing Attention: Emerging Artists in Dialogue" (27 October 2023 – 28 January 2024) .

== Artist's Garden ==
The Artist's Garden is an outdoor exhibition space behind the Art Gallery, within the York Museum Gardens. Sculptural exhibitions have been displayed in this open air space since 2016. Exhibitions have included:

- Foundation Myths by Charles Holland (2016 – 2017) was the first exhibition in the Artist's Garden.
- Leisureland Golf by Doug Fishbourne (3 June 2017 – 3 September 2017) was a fully playable crazy-golf course and sculptural installation.
- The Pollinarium (27 September – 6 October 2018) was a timber structure, covered with flowering plants and shown as part of the York Mediale.
- Michael Lyons: Ancient and Modern (25 May 2019 – May 2020) was a series of sculptures by Michael Lyons. It was the first time such a large exhibition of outdoor sculpture had been displayed in York.
- The Red Bags by Bea Last (24 March 2023 - 4 June 2023) was exhibited as part of the Aesthetica Art Prize 2023 exhibition.
