= Dianne Willcocks =

British social scientist (born 1945)

Dianne Marie Willcocks CBE DL (born 5 May 1945) was the Vice-Chancellor of York St John University until retirement in April 2010 and is a former Deputy Principal of Sheffield Hallam University.

== Biography ==
She received a Dip.M from Ealing College of Higher Education in 1966, and a BSc (Hons) in Human Sciences from the University of Surrey in 1976.

Willcocks worked as director of research at the University of North London. She moved from London to Sheffield as Assistant Principal of Sheffield Hallam University. In 1999 she became the first Principal of Ripon and York St John College in 160 years.

She was appointed Commander of the Order of the British Empire (CBE) in the 2008 Birthday Honours.

After retirement, Willcocks has continued her work in gerontology as Chair of the Wilf Ward Family Trust, as a Patron of Older Citizens Advocacy, York, and has served as Health Champion for York’s Older Person’s Assembly.

=== Other appointments ===
Below are a selection of Dianne Willcocks' other appointments.

- Chair of Trustees, York Theatre Royal
- Chair, Action on Access Advisory Forum
- Member of Executive Board, GuildHE
- Board Member, Aimhigher National Partnership
- Board Member, Yorkshire Film Archive
- Deputy Lieutenant, North Yorkshire
- Trustee, York Museums Trust
- Trustee, Higher Education Academy
- Trustee, York Mediale.
- Deputy chair of the trustees of the Joseph Rowntree Foundation

== Publications ==
- Peace, S., Kellaher, L., and Willcocks, D. 1982.A Balanced Life?. Survey Research Unit, The Polytechnic of North London.
- Willcocks, D., Peace, S. and Kellaher, L. 1986. Private lives in public places: a research-based critique of residential life in local authority old people's homes. London, Tavistock.
- Kellaher, L., Peace, S., and Willcocks, D. 1990. "Triangulating data". In: Peace, Sheila M. (ed.) Researching Social Gerontology: Concepts, Methods and Issues. London, Sage. 115–128.
- Peace, S., Kellaher, L., and Willcocks, D. 1997. Re-evaluating residential care. Buckingham, Open University Press.
