= Werra and Weser Slipware =

Slip-decorated earthenware made in Germany

Werra ware and Weser ware are related classes of slip-decorated earthenware made in central Germany from the second half of the sixteenth century to the first half of the seventeenth century. Werra and Weser wares were part of a wider flourishing movement of Renaissance slipware manufacture in Europe which began in the early sixteenth century. This included the French pottery of Beauvais and Saintonge, North Holland slipware and similar wares made in other parts of the German-speaking lands, as well as in Switzerland, Poland and Hungary. In Britain, imports of these and similar wares are thought to have influenced the slip-trailed ‘Metropolitan’ pottery made in Harlow, Essex, throughout the seventeenth century as well as some Staffordshire and other wares.

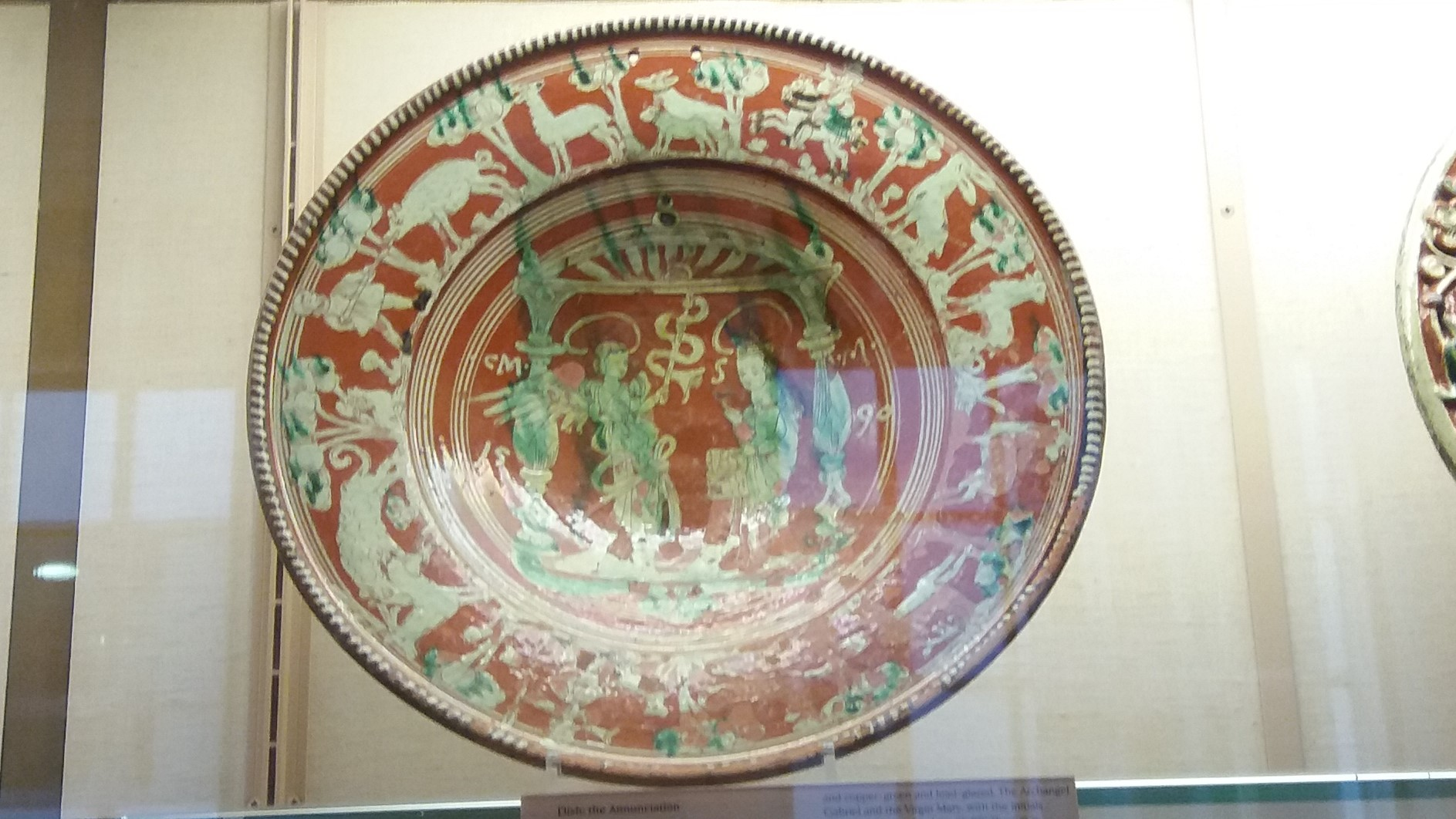
The Annunciation: a fine example of Werra ware dated 1590. On display at the Fitzwilliam Museum, Cambridge, England.

== Ceramic type, glazing and decoration ==
Werra and Weser slipwares were a lead-glazed earthenware pottery contemporary with but distinct from the opaque tin-glazed wares such as Delft, Majolica and Faenza.

Lead glaze provided a transparent or near-transparent glaze through which the body of the clay remained visible. Werra ware was red-bodied whilst Weser ware was made of a finer, white-firing clay.

Werra and Weser slipwares developed their own distinctive but closely related styles of decoration. Both types were decorated by squeezing and trailing a clay solution (slip) through a fine nozzle onto the biscuit-fired vessel (sometimes onto a slip ground previously applied to the vessel), rather than by applying pigment with a brush, resulting in a freer style of representation. Werra ware was usually more elaborately decorated and often employed in addition a sgraffito technique.

== The wares: A comparison ==
Although there is a family resemblance between Werra and Weser and much overlap in the repertoire of forms, the differences, especially in decoration, amply justify being placed into two distinct classes.

=== History ===
The manufacture of Weser ware is thought to have begun around 1550 whilst Werra ware has been dated to between 1560 and 1568, twenty or so years after the first appearance of Haffner ware, the earliest high-quality polychrome earthenware to be made in the German lands. Werra ware is believed to have emerged from a tradition of lead-glazed stove-tile manufacture existing in the area in the 1520s. Lead-glazing had rarely been used in central Germany before this date, whilst it was well established in the Netherlands where there was also use of sgraffito between 1400 and 1500, a technique later adopted in Werra ware decoration.

=== Clay types and firing ===
Werra ware, a red-bodied earthenware, was fired twice, like tin-glaze wares: first to biscuit hardness, which was then decorated with slip decoration, covered with a lead glaze and fired again (the glost firing). The fabric of Werra ware is a uniform light red which fires to a vivid light brown when glazed.

Weser, a whiteware, was fired once at a higher temperature which enabled thinner potting, made possible by the use of a clay sufficiently plastic to allow the vessel to retain its shape, rather than melt, in a hotter kiln. Weser shards show that the fabric may vary in colour from a stoneware-like grey to a pinkish-orange or buff colour.

=== Forms ===
==== Weser ware ====
Hollow ware (such as jugs and tankards) is represented in both wares but is more common in Weser ware where German ceramic authority Hans-Georg Stephan says there is evidence that the production of pipkins and pots (utility kitchen ware without elaborate decoration, if any) was “almost as common” as that of flatware. Slip-decorated tankards and jugs were made by the Weser potters but are thought to be uncommon.

==== Werra ware ====
The Werra potters are known to have made a range of wall tiles, pipkins, tankards, jugs and puzzle jugs, but, according to Hans-Georg Stephan, such items “were produced only rarely”. Flatware (dishes, plates and bowls) was the main staple of Werra production.

=== Decoration of wares ===
==== Weser ware ====
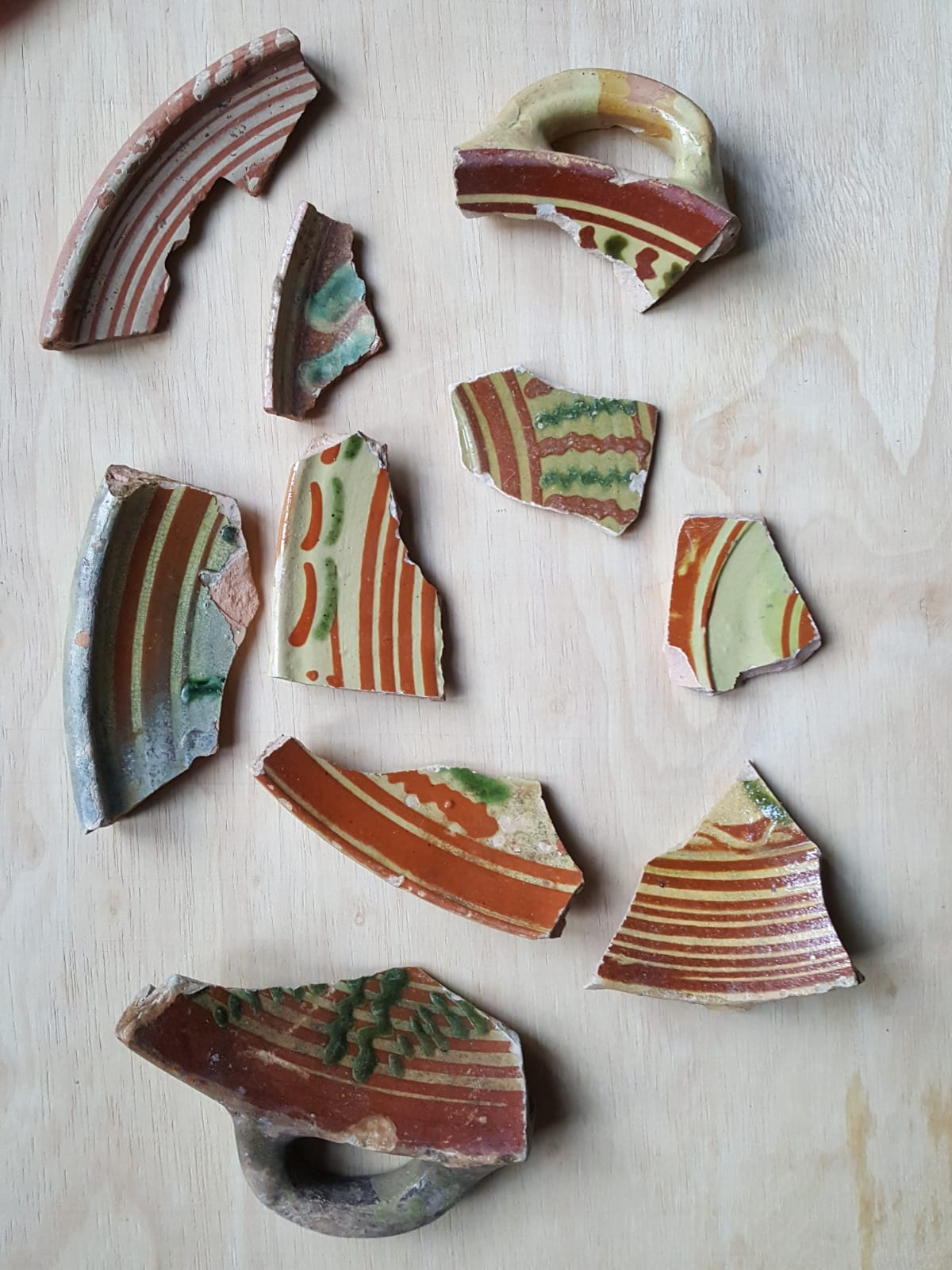
A selection of typical Weser-ware sherds found in South East England.

The artistic flair of the Weser and Werra slip-decorators is displayed to most striking effect on dishes and plates. Whilst the Werra decorator applied the slip to the biscuit-fired vessel and the colour of the clay body remained visible after glost-firing, in Weser ware, by contrast, the well, rim and handles (if any) of the vessel were covered with a white slip which fired to a pastel yellow on which, when dry, were superimposed geometrical patterns in light brown slip. These patterns typically consist of about three half-inch bands forming a series of concentric circles between the rim and the centre which fire to an orange-brown. The circles are flanked on each side by a thin band of the same colour. In the roughly three-inch space between the outermost circle and the next, there is often a pattern of wavy lines at right-angles to the rim in alternating green and brown slip. In the central circle, or ‘medallion’, formed by the third band there may be one of several variants of a star-like design made by trailing alternating green and brown wavy lines. Sometimes instead of a star pattern there is a trailed depiction of, say, a stylised bird.

==== Werra ware ====
Werra flatware decoration was more ornate. It usually, though not always, consists of a human or animal image placed in the centre as the focal point of the design and then surrounded by concentric decorative lines on the outside. The more abstract or free-flowing parts of the design involved trailing slip from a quill attached to an animal horn. These anthropomorphic and zoomorphic shapes were given rich detail by scratching lines in the white slip to reveal the dark clay underneath, a form of drawing known as sgraffito and commonly associated with slipware decoration. Apart from human, animal and sometimes vegetable imagery, Werra-ware decoration employed such repeating motifs as dots, dashes, wavy lines, spirals, loops, squiggles and scrolling devices. The anthropomorphic imagery was frequently religious or drawn from military and courtly life: knights mounted or unmounted, soldiers (often carrying halberds), elaborately dressed ladies and gentlemen, and Biblical subjects such as angels, the Annunciation, Adam and Eve and The Last Supper. The Annunciation plate at the Fitzwilliam Museum, Cambridge, pictured here and dated 1590, is one of the finest examples of this decorative technique.

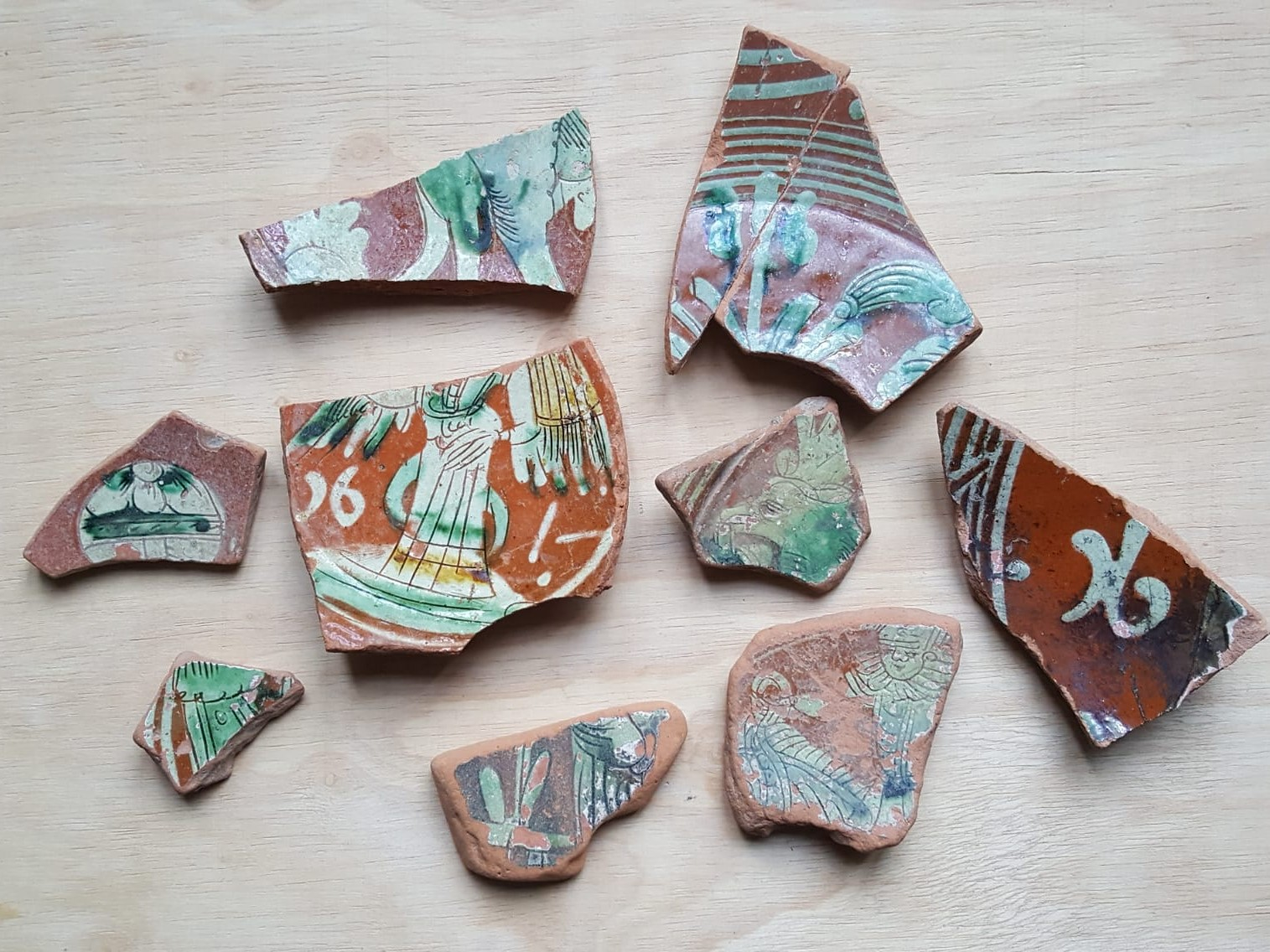
A selection of typical Werra-ware sherds found in South East England.

Some Weser dishes also feature a lined zone and a courtly human image (rarely, if ever, sgraffito), but whereas in Weser it is rare, in Werra it is a defining feature.

=== Archaeology & Classification ===
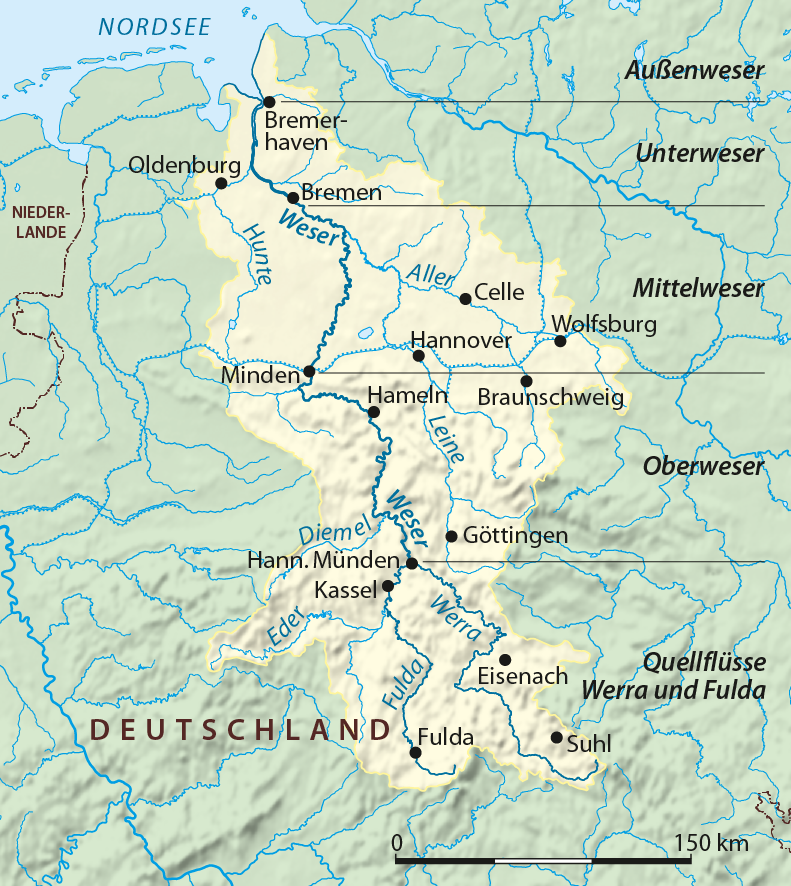
A map showing the confluence of the rivers Werra and Weser, Germany

The modern classification and naming of the Werra and Weser pottery types was made during the twentieth century, following a period of archaeological discovery between 1940 and the 1970s. They are named after two conjoined rivers situated midway between the Rhine and the Elbe. The Weser, the longer of the two, flows into the North Sea at Bremen; the Werra, a substantial tributary of the Weser which arises to the south in the Upper Hesse region, joins the main river at Munden near Eisenach.

What is now known as Werra ware was known as ‘Wanfried’ ware when it first came to scholarly attention in 1896. Excavations had uncovered fragments from around four hundred dishes at the small town of Wanfried-an-der-Werra in the middle of present-day Germany near Eisenach, Upper Hesse and for many years Wanfried was thought to be the sole manufacturing source of the ware. But after further finds along the river Werra between the end of the 1930s and about 1980, including kilns and workshops, scholars began to regard the identification of the pottery with Wanfried as misleading. Shortly before the Second World War many fragments were found at Bremen which diverged enough from Werra ware for the scholar E Grohne to suggest that they were a separate regional style.

The name ‘Weser’ emerged for the Bremen type on the assumption that wherever it was made it was shipped on the river for export via Bremen. Over the next twenty years Hans-Georg Stephan and others identified up to a hundred kilns and manufacturing sites to the east of the Weser but near enough for shipping. The area of these sites was called the Pottland, and, writing in 1987, Stephan mentions several such centres, noting that, “the first discovery of actual wasters [shards] was made at Coppengrave, near Duingen”, and that the probable number of workshops making Weser ware was between fifty and eighty, similar to the number making Werra. He adds, “until a few years ago almost no attention was paid to Weser in German ceramic studies” yet it was “undoubtedly one of the most important types in German slipware”.

More manufacturing centres were unearthed along the Werra and the first major discovery to provide evidence that the pottery was not made solely at Wanfried occurred at Witzenhausen in May 1978. Another at Münden (where the river Werra joins the larger Weser) in 1979 added substantially to the quantity of Werra then known. From the Witzenhausen finds we have the earliest Werra fragment bearing a date (1568) and the latest (1653) though most dated pieces range from the 1590s to the 1620s.

=== Export trade ===
To contemporaries, before its rediscovery in the late nineteenth century, the pottery we now call Werra and Weser ware was almost certainly known as Hessian ware. As recently as 1974 an exhibition of Werra ware in Kassel used this term. In 1602 the Dutch authorities granted a monopoly to a named individual in the town of Enkhuizen giving him the sole right to manufacture ‘Hessian and Brunswick earthenwares’ from local clays. Archaeologists who have studied this ware see a close resemblance between it and Werra originals. The Enkhuizen development is not surprising given that Holland was a very large export market for both Werra and Weser. Between about 1580 and about 1620 there was a very large export trade in both types. Werra ware is found on many sites around the coast of England; Weser ware also appears, though perhaps to a lesser extent. Both types are found in many parts of Scandinavia and to the east along the Baltic coast. Much Werra ware has been found in colonial America, though only two pieces of Weser. Exports of both were reduced drastically at the outbreak in 1621 of the Thirty Years' War.
