= Slipware =

Pottery with a coating of slip

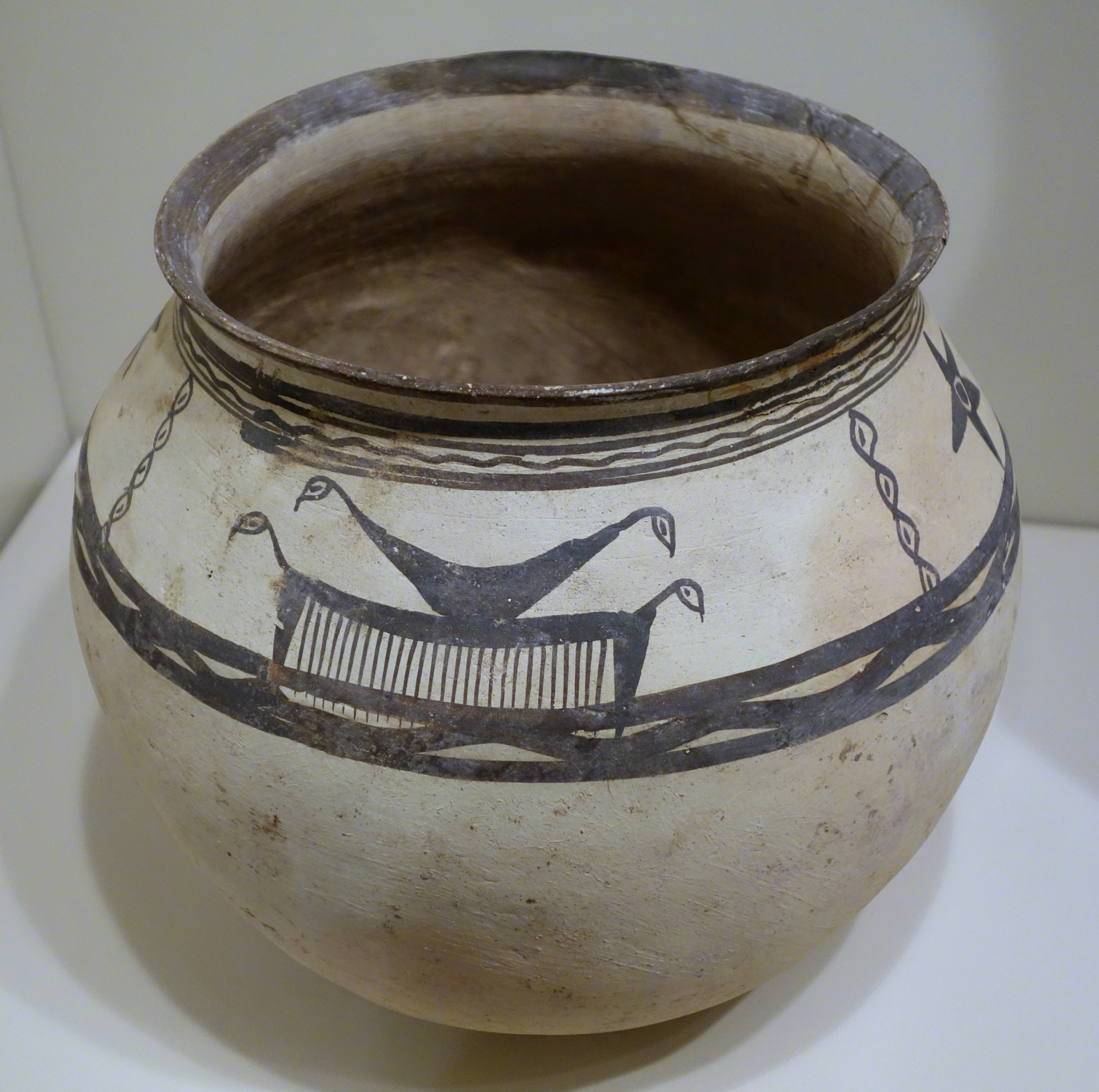
Jar, Giyan IV type, Western Iran, 2500–2000 BC, earthenware with slip-painted decoration

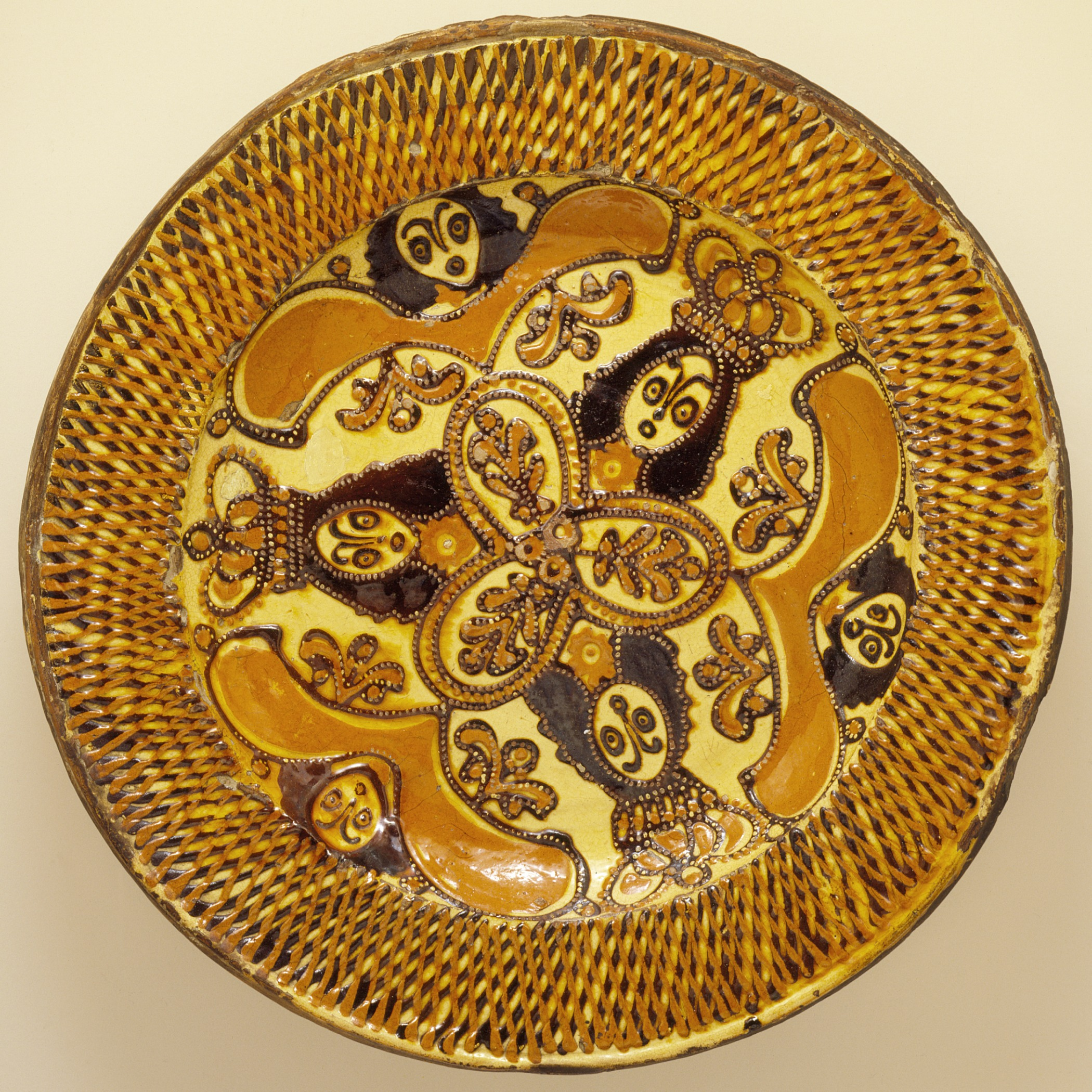
Charger with Charles II in the Boscobel Oak, English, c. 1685. Such large plates, for display rather than use, take slip-trailing to an extreme, building up lattices of thick trails of slip.

Slipware is pottery identified by its primary decorating process where slip is placed onto the leather-hard (semi-hardened) clay body surface before firing by dipping, painting or splashing. Slip is an aqueous suspension of a clay body, which is a mixture of clays and other minerals such as quartz, feldspar and mica. The slip placed onto a wet or leather-hard clay body surface by a variety of techniques including dipping, painting, piping or splashing.

Principal techniques include slip painting, where the slip is treated like paint and used to create a design with brushes or other implements, and slip trailing, where the slip, usually rather thick, is dripped, piped or trailed onto the body, typically from some device like the piping bag used to decorate cakes. The French term for slip is barbotine, and this term may be used for both techniques, but usually from different periods.

Often only pottery where the slip creates patterns or images will be described as slipware, as opposed to the many types where a plain slip is applied to the whole body, for example most fine wares in Ancient Roman pottery, such as African red slip ware (note: "slip ware", not "slipware"). Decorative slips may be a different colour than the underlying clay body or offer other decorative qualities. Selectively applying layers of colored slips can create the effect of a painted ceramic, such as in the black-figure or red-figure pottery styles of Ancient Greek pottery. Slip decoration is an ancient technique in Chinese pottery also, used to cover whole vessels over 4,000 years ago.

== History ==
Many prehistoric and historic cultures used slip as the primary decorating material on their ware, especially in early periods. These include most prehistoric cultures of the Middle East and much later Islamic pottery, cultures in many areas of Africa, most pottery-making cultures in the Americas, early Japanese (and later Onta ware) and much Korean pottery. Much Mycenean ware, Ancient Greek pottery and Ancient Roman pottery used slip, as did pre-industrialized potters in many areas of Europe, including Great Britain, most notably Thomas Toft in the Staffordshire Potteries.

Later potters mostly combined or replaced the use of slip with ceramic glazes and pigments offering a tougher finish and a wider range of colours. But a variety of slipware techniques were revived by various studio pottery movements from the 19th century on. In England Bernard Leach and in America Mary Louise McLaughlin were among the leaders of these revivals.

== Techniques ==
A coating of white or coloured slip (sometimes called by the French term engobe in American English) can be applied to the whole body of the article, or just one part, such as outside or inside of a cup or jug, to improve its appearance, to give a smoother surface to a rough body, mask an inferior colour or for decorative effect. Slip can also be applied by painting techniques, in isolation or in several layers and colours. Sgraffito (or "sgraffiato") involves scratching through a layer of coloured slip to reveal a different colour or the base body underneath. Several layers of slip and/or sgraffito can be done while the pot is still in an unfired state. One colour of slip can be fired, before a second is applied, and prior to the scratching or incising decoration. This is particularly useful if the base body is not of the desired colour or texture.

Chinese pottery also used techniques where patterns, images or calligraphy were created as part-dried slip was cut away to reveal a lower layer of slip or the main clay body in a contrasting colour. The latter of these is called the "cut-glaze" technique.

Slipware may be carved or burnished to change the surface appearance of the ware. Specialized slip recipes may be applied to biscuit ware and then refired.

== Examples ==
An example of slipware artifact is the Harvest jug.

== Gallery ==
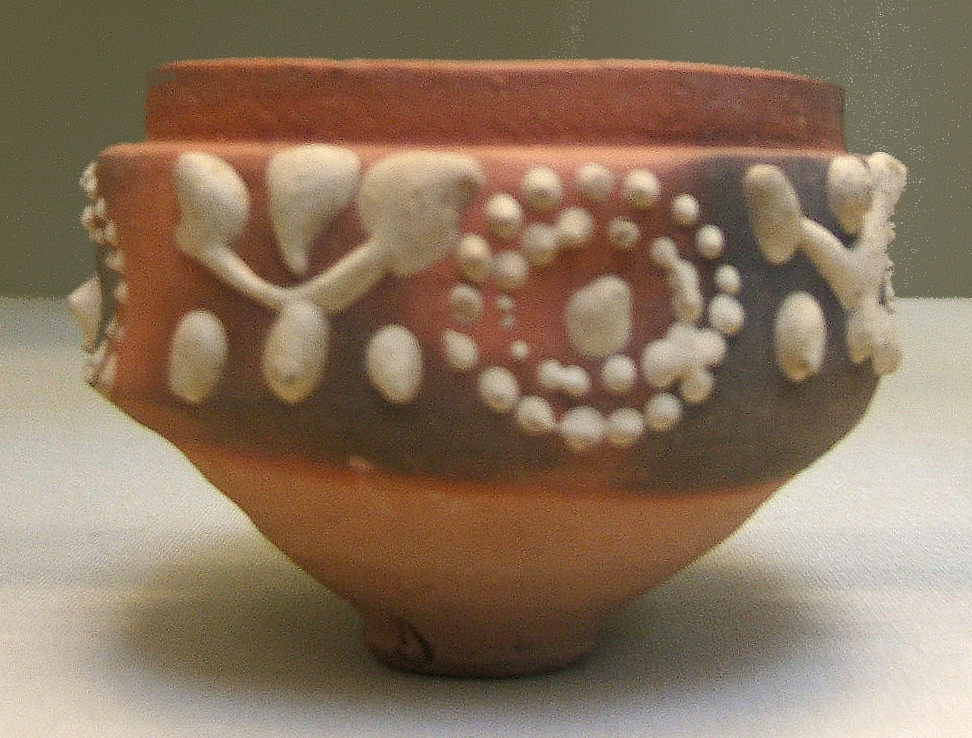
Simple slip-trailing in thick blobs, Roman Egypt, 0–200 AD

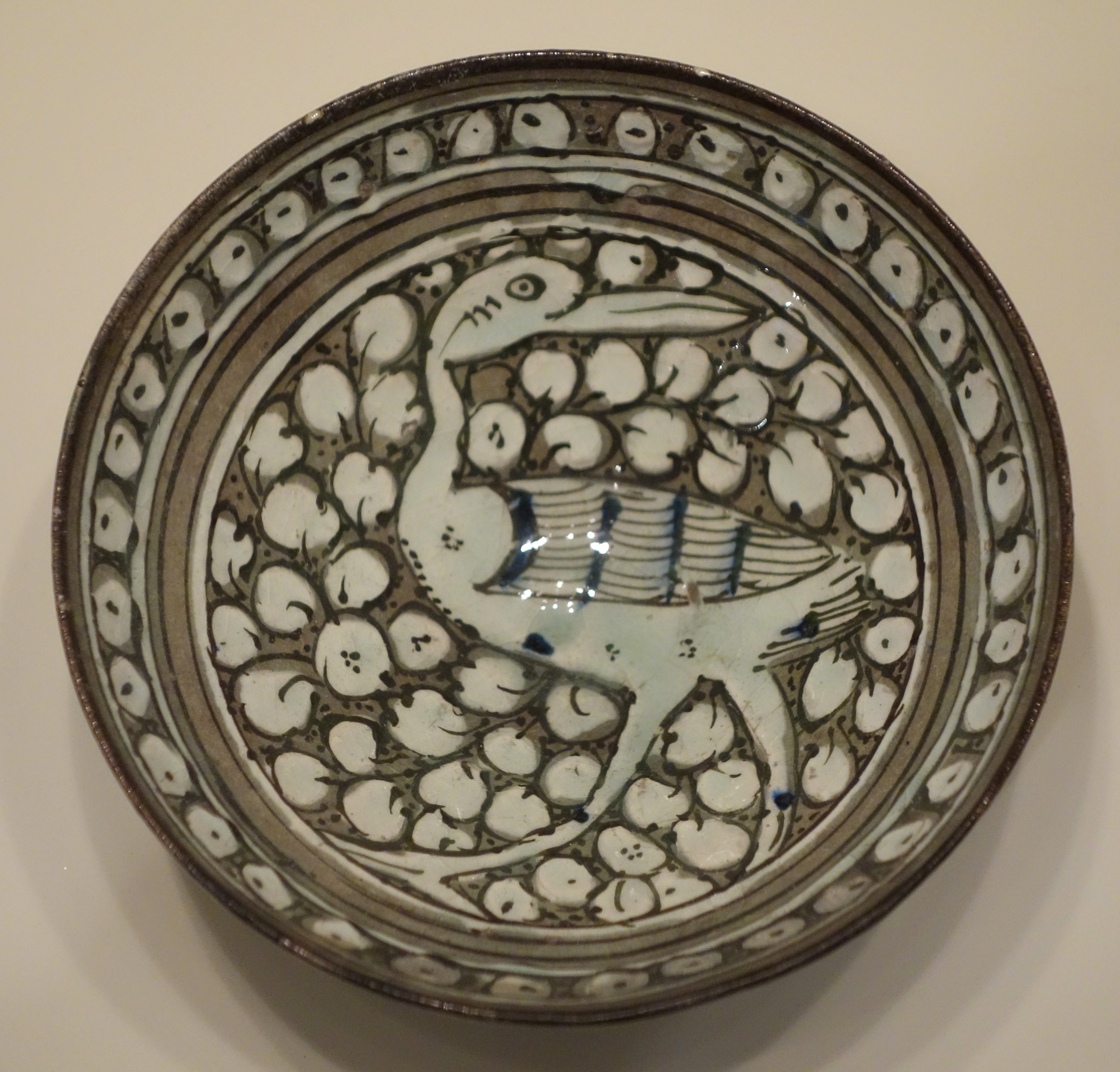
Bowl with strutting bird, Sultanabad ware, Iran, Ilkhanid period, first half of 14th century, earthenware with gray engobe and underglaze painting in blue, black, white slip

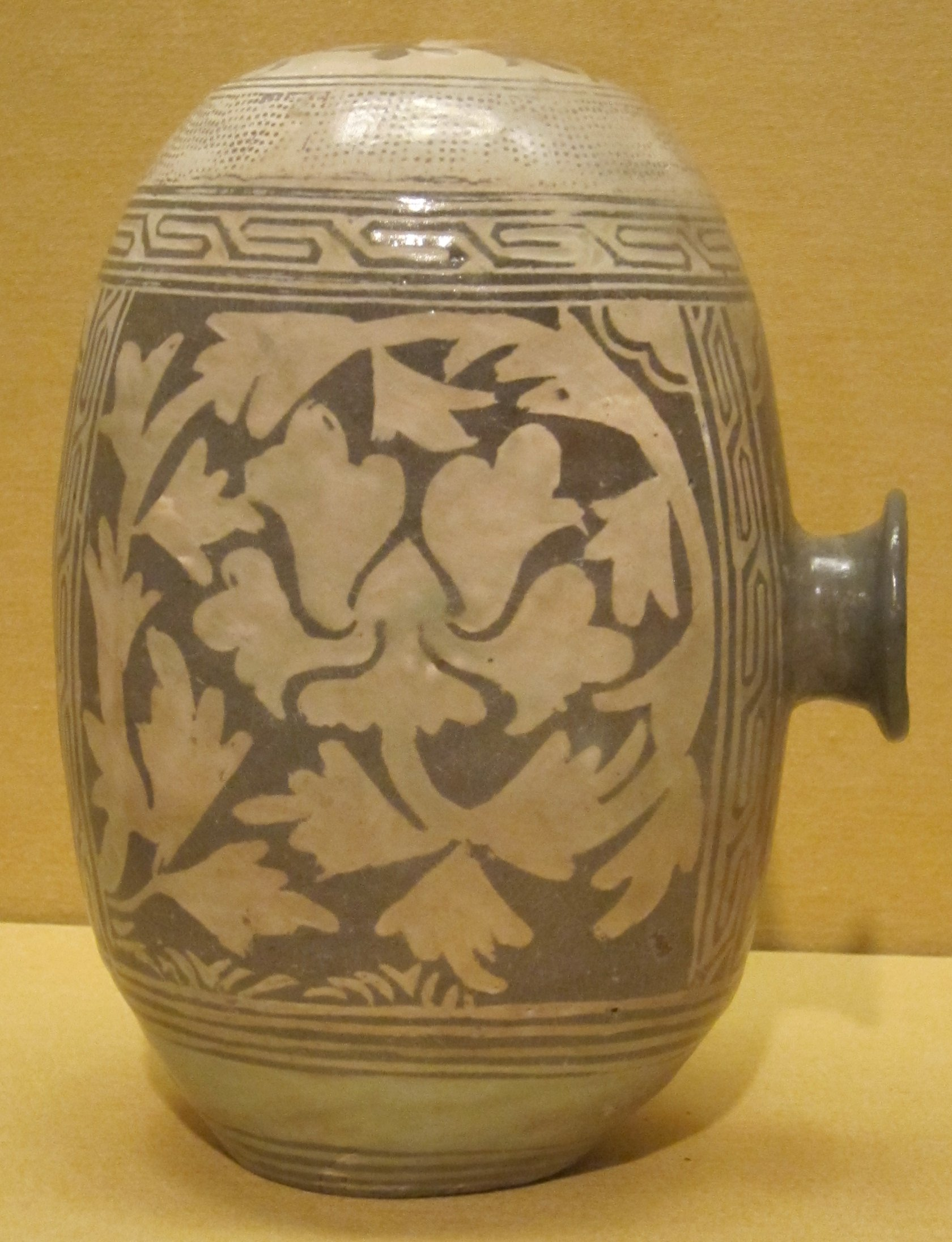
Korean punch'ong ware pear-shaped wine bottle, Choson dynasty, second half of 15th century, stoneware with glaze and white slip decoration

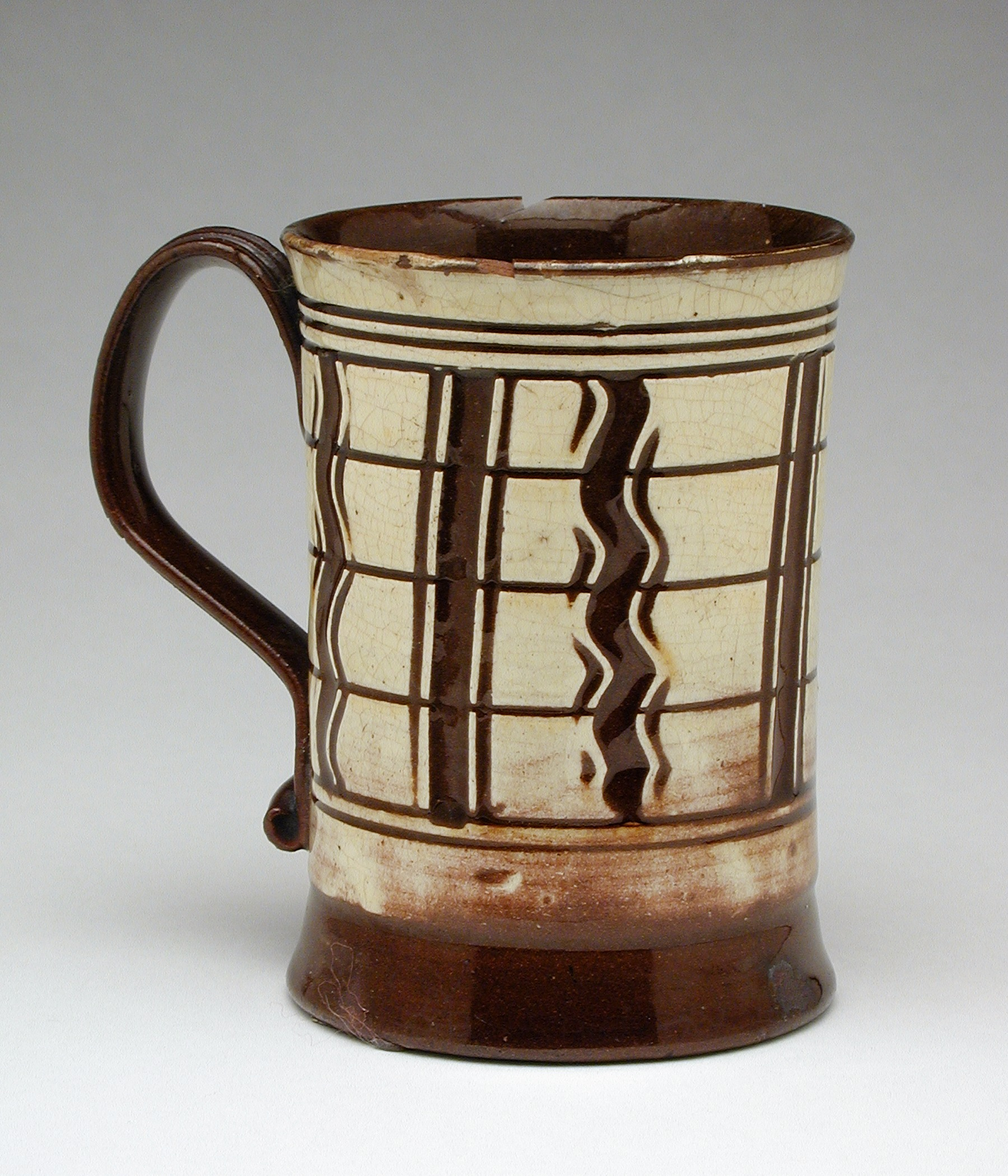
English Slipware mug, c. 1740

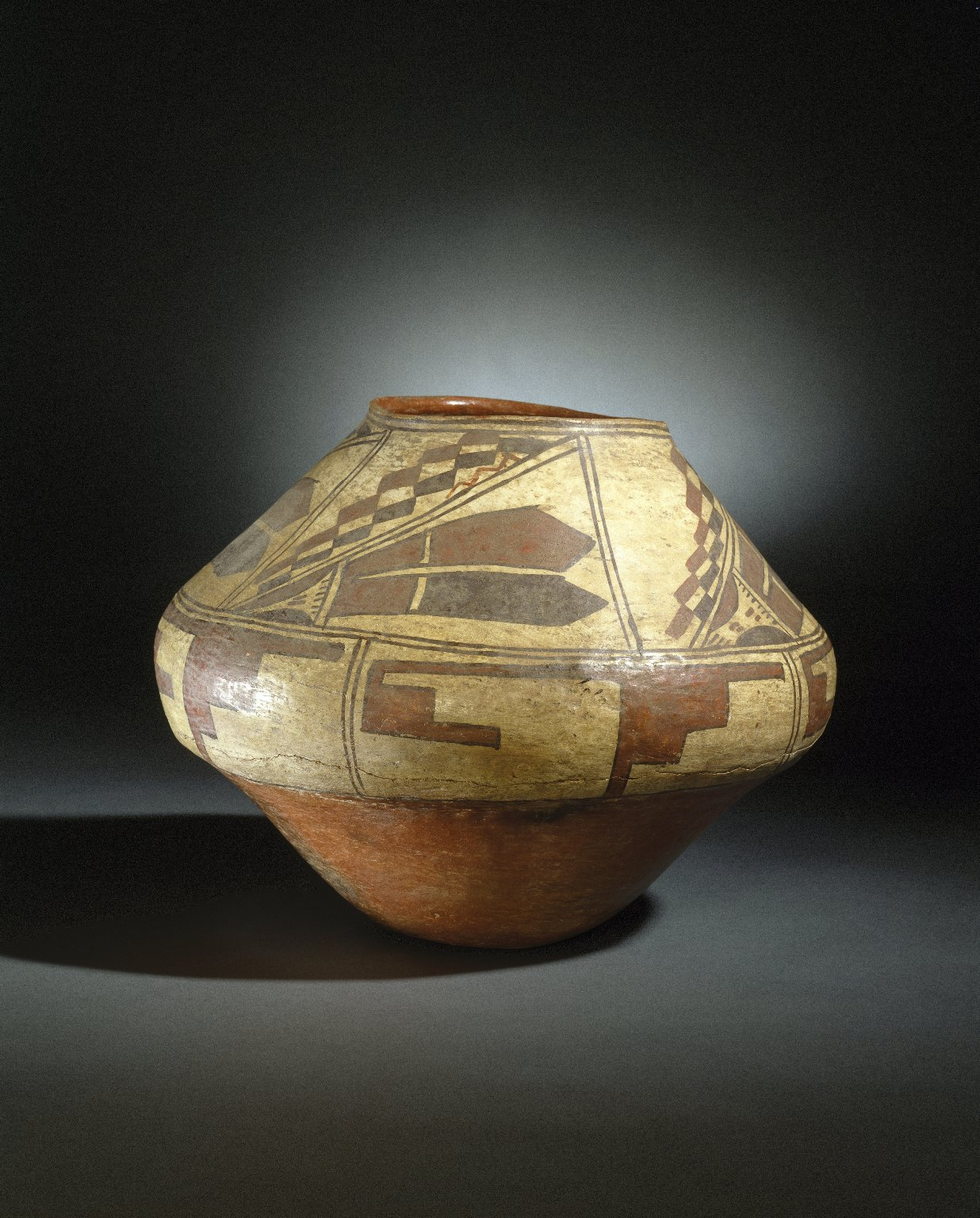
Ashiwi slip-painted jar, She-we-na Zuni Pueblo, 1700–1750

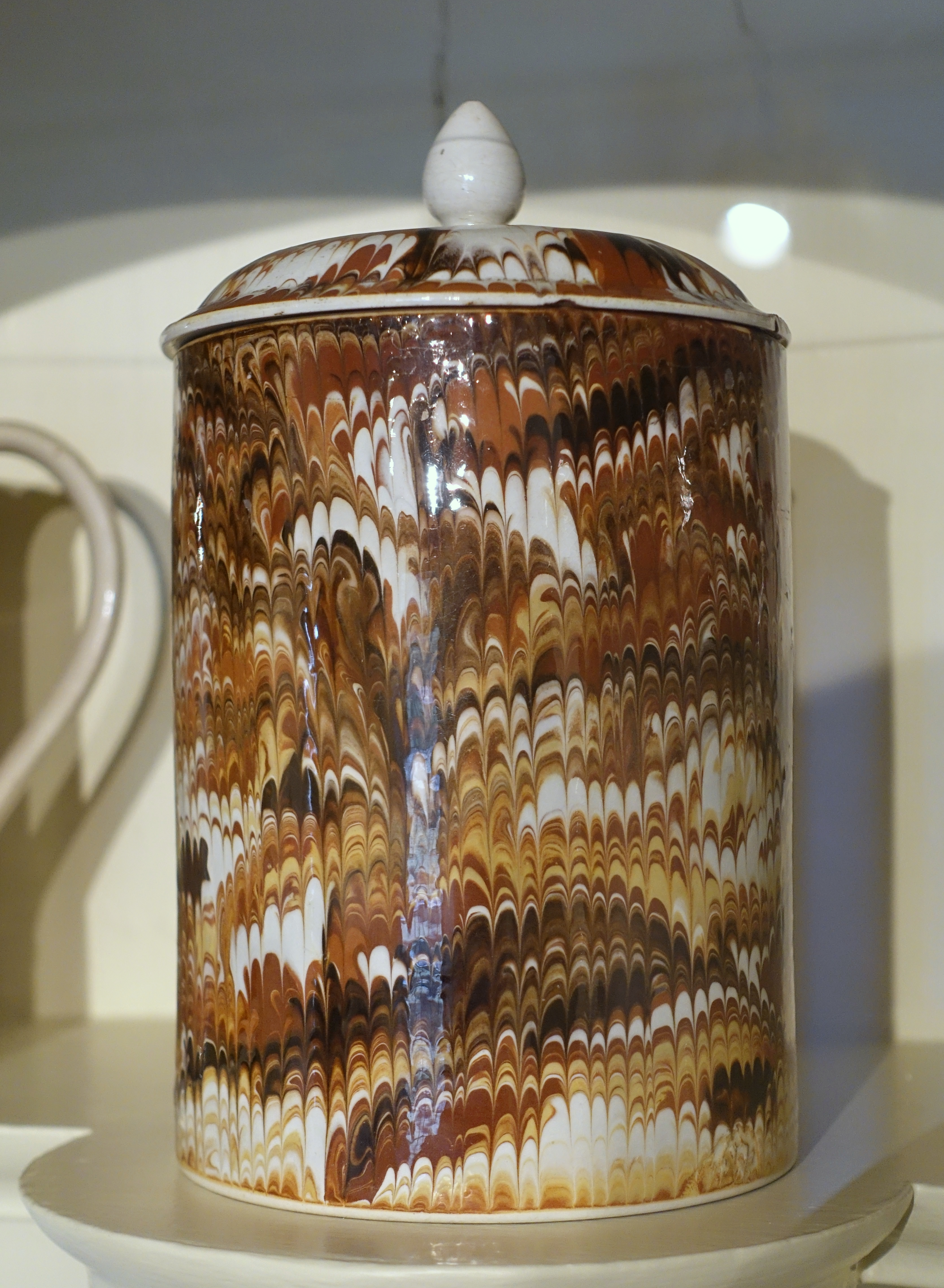
Sugar bowl with combed, slip-marbled decoration, China, c. 1795, porcelain

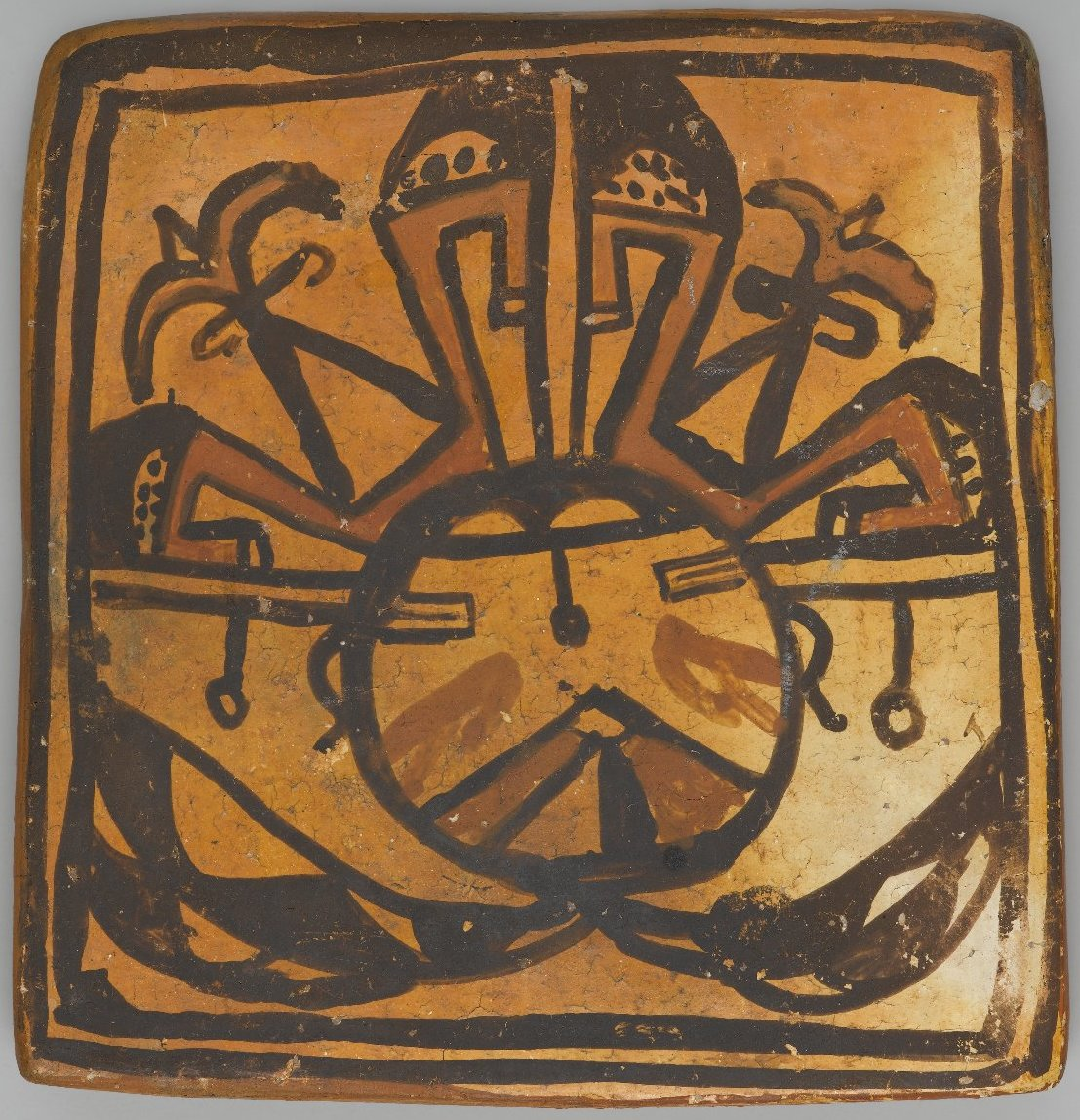
Tile, Hopi Pueblo, late 19th-early 20th century

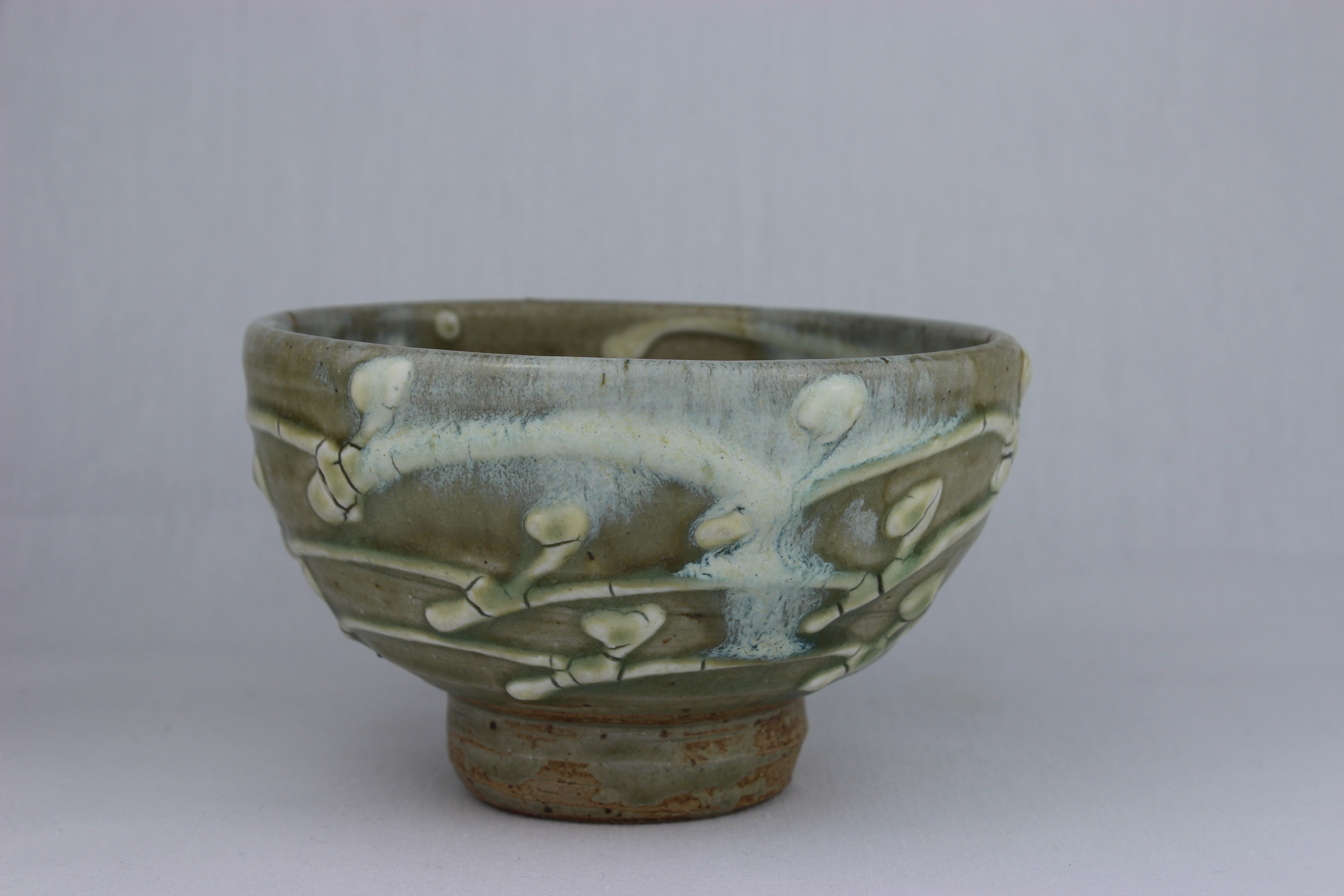
Modern slip-trailed bowl by Takeshi Yasuda

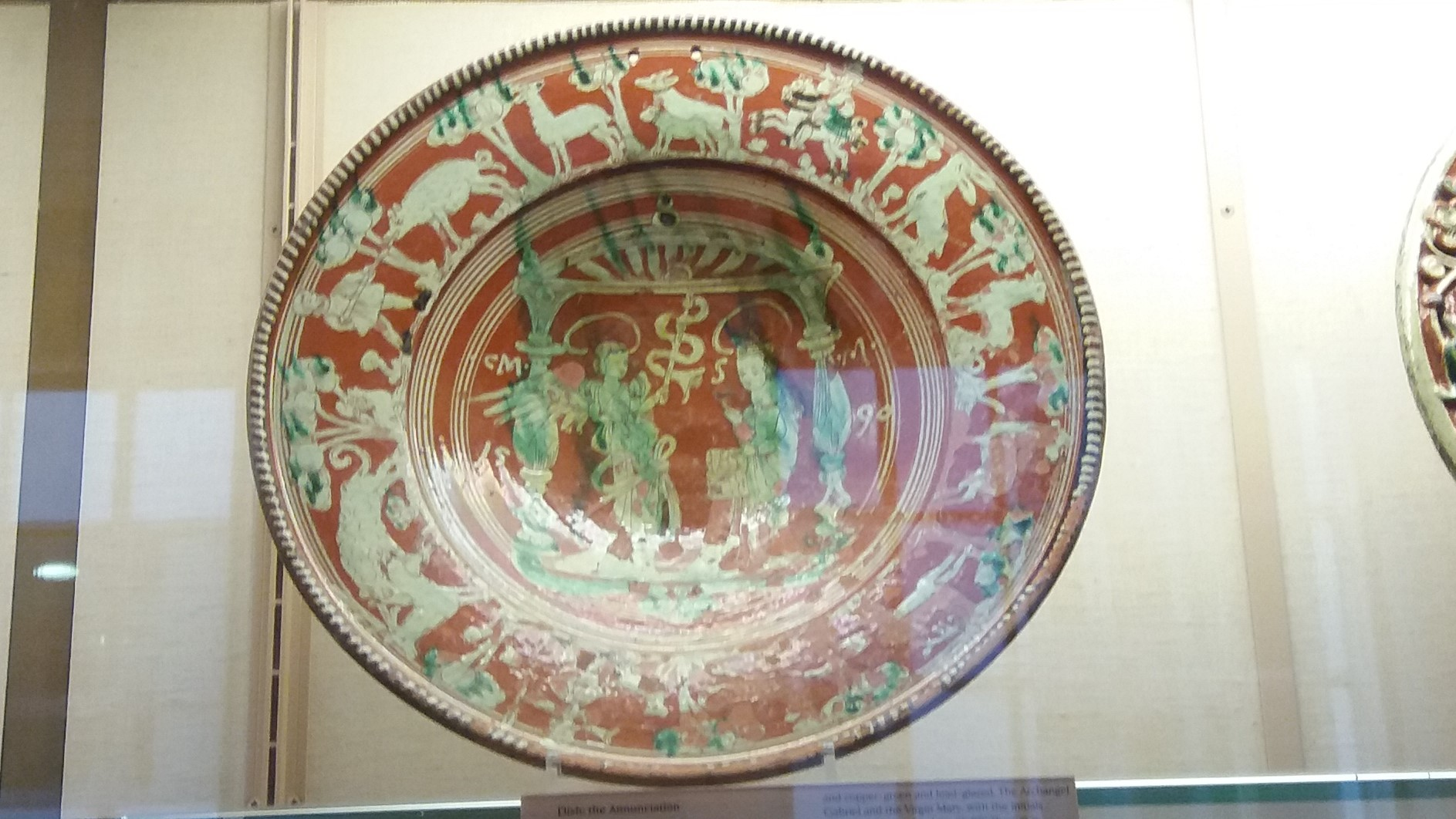
A fine Werra ware slip-decorated dish dated 1590, Germany

== See also ==
- Werra and Weser Slipware
- Pottery
- Ceramics
- Ceramic glazes
- Glossary of pottery terms
- Porcelain
