= Harvest jug =

A Harvest jug is a type of jug made from slipware, with decoration carved through stained clay layers. They are named for their use to carry ale or cider at harvest time.

The technique for carving the decoration is known as sgraffito, from the Italian for 'scratched'.

They are traditional in the south-west of England, especially the ports of Barnstaple and Bideford in north Devon and Donyatt in Somerset. They are still made.
