= Mark Hearld =

British artist (born 1974)

Mark Hearld (born 1974) is a British artist. He is known for his collages and prints that often feature animals and elements from nature.

== Early life and education ==
Hearld was born in 1974. When he was a teenager, he moved with his family from York to the nearby village of Heslington. The farmland of the area inspired his art. He often would go to farms and draw. He studied at the Glasgow School of Art and then received his master's degree in Natural History Illustration from the Royal College of Art. His tutor there was trained by the artist Edward Bawden.

== Career ==
After graduation from the Royal College of Art, Hearld's work was noticed by the artist Alex Malcolmson who displayed his work in his gallery shows in Harrogate. He became well known after his work was exhibited in galleries in London, as well as Harrogate and Norfolk.

Hearld creates collages and prints that often feature animals and elements from nature. He works "with the idea of the artist working as a designer rather than making images to stick in a frame." A writer of a profile of Hearld for The Times stated "If you want a child to care about the planet, don't tell them it's burning, show them Hearld's wrens and squirrels, field mice and owls."

Hearld created for the sets of the 2010 film Nanny McPhee and the Big Bang. In 2012, Hearld published Mark Hearld's Work Book, which he designed with Nicola Bailey. In 2020, Hearld's collages and linocuts were displayed at the Yorkshire Sculpture Park. In 2021, a Christmas card by Hearld featuring a "hand-coloured winter thrush" was included in the exhibition Christmas Greetings by Modern British Artists at Pallant House Gallery in Chichester; over one hundred cards were displayed there, including from John Piper, Edward Bawden, John Craxton, and Ben Nicholson. In 2022, Heard worked on the book Raucous Invention: The Joy of Making. In 2023, Hearld collaborated with the fashion house Moynat and the British brand A State of Nature.

== Awards and honours ==
In 2012, Hearld received the British Design Award for his Harvest Hare wallpaper; readers of The Daily Telegraph and Elle Decoration chose him and five other designers from a shortlist of 30 artworks created over the past year.
