= York Mediale =

Media arts festival in York

- Formation: 2014; 12 years ago
- Type: Charitable Incorporated Organisation
- Legal status: Charity
- Headquarters: Plump studios, Swinegate Court East, Swinegate, York, YO1 8AJ, England, UK
- Board of directors: Timothy Ivan Leigh (Chair)
- Key people: Trustees: Justine Catherine Andrew; Prof Dianne Marie Willcocks; Sean Martin Bullick; David James Dickson

York Mediale was an international media arts festival produced by Mediale. It was founded in 2014. It is linked to the city's position as the only UNESCO City of Media Arts. Festivals were held in 2018 and 2020, featuring international digital arts.

== History ==
York Mediale was founded in 2014, and incorporated as a charity in June 2020. It hosted its first festival, of the same name, in 2018. It is linked to the city's position as the only UNESCO City of Media Arts. In 2022 Mediale took part in the creative consortium Festival UK* 2022. In 2024, they held an 'immersive, multidisciplinary artist development residency', called Immersive Assembly, which has supported artists from Argentina, China, Ghana, Mexico, the UK, Denmark and Zimbabwe.

=== York Mediale 2018 ===
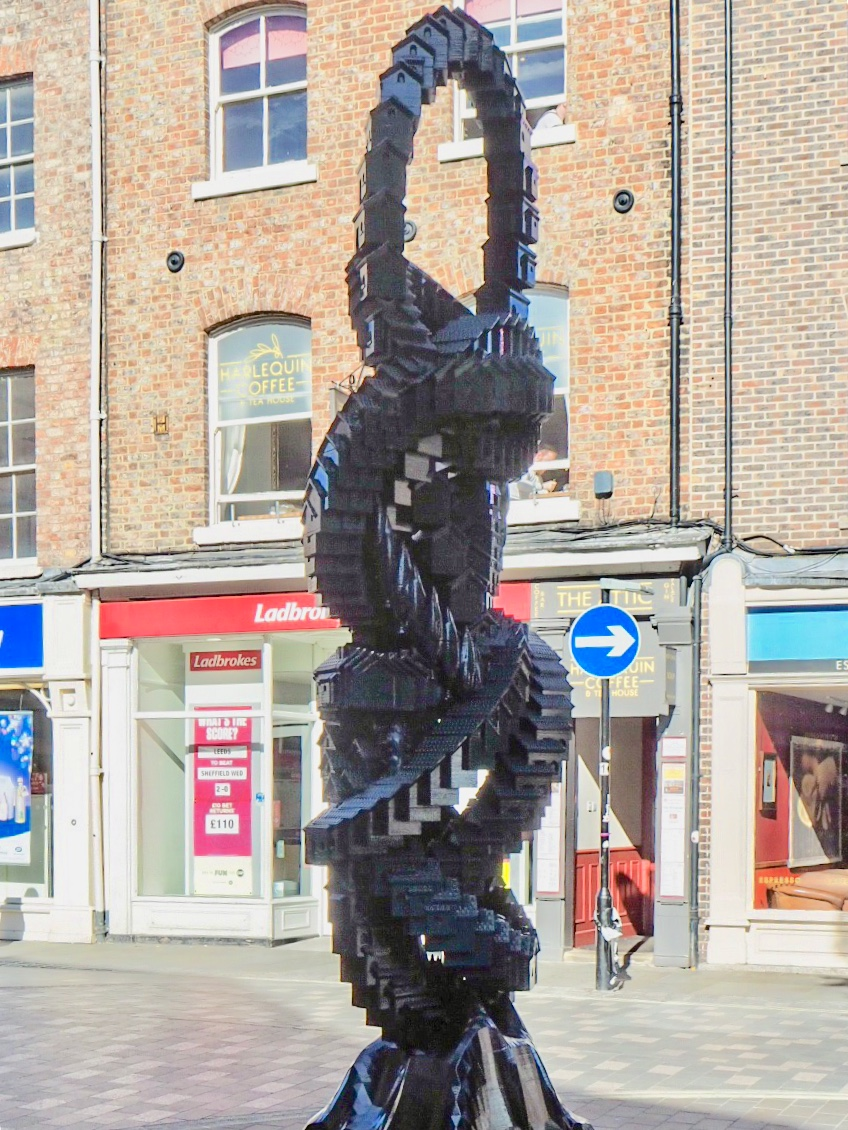
Token Homes by Matthew Plummer Fernandez in King's Square, York, 2018.

The first York Mediale festival ran from 27 September 2018–6 October 2018 and featured events and installations at York Art Gallery, Holy Trinity Church, Goodramgate, York Guildhall, and King's Square from artists including Isaac Julien, Phil Coy, and Deep Lab.

=== York Mediale 2020 ===
The second York Mediale festival started on 21 October 2020 and has varying end-dates for the different parts of its four main installations. It featured: 'Human Nature', a series of three installations by Memo Akten, Kelly Richardson, and Rachel Goodyear held at York Art Gallery (until 21 May 2021); 'Good Neighbours', a digitally enhanced walking documentary in Layerthorpe (until 25 October 2020); 'Absent Sitters', a virtual audio-visual experience by Gazelle Twin (until 25 October); and 'People we Love', an exhibition by Kit Monkman at York Minster (2 November 2020 to 29 November 2020).
