= Sultanabad ware =

Medieval Persian pottery

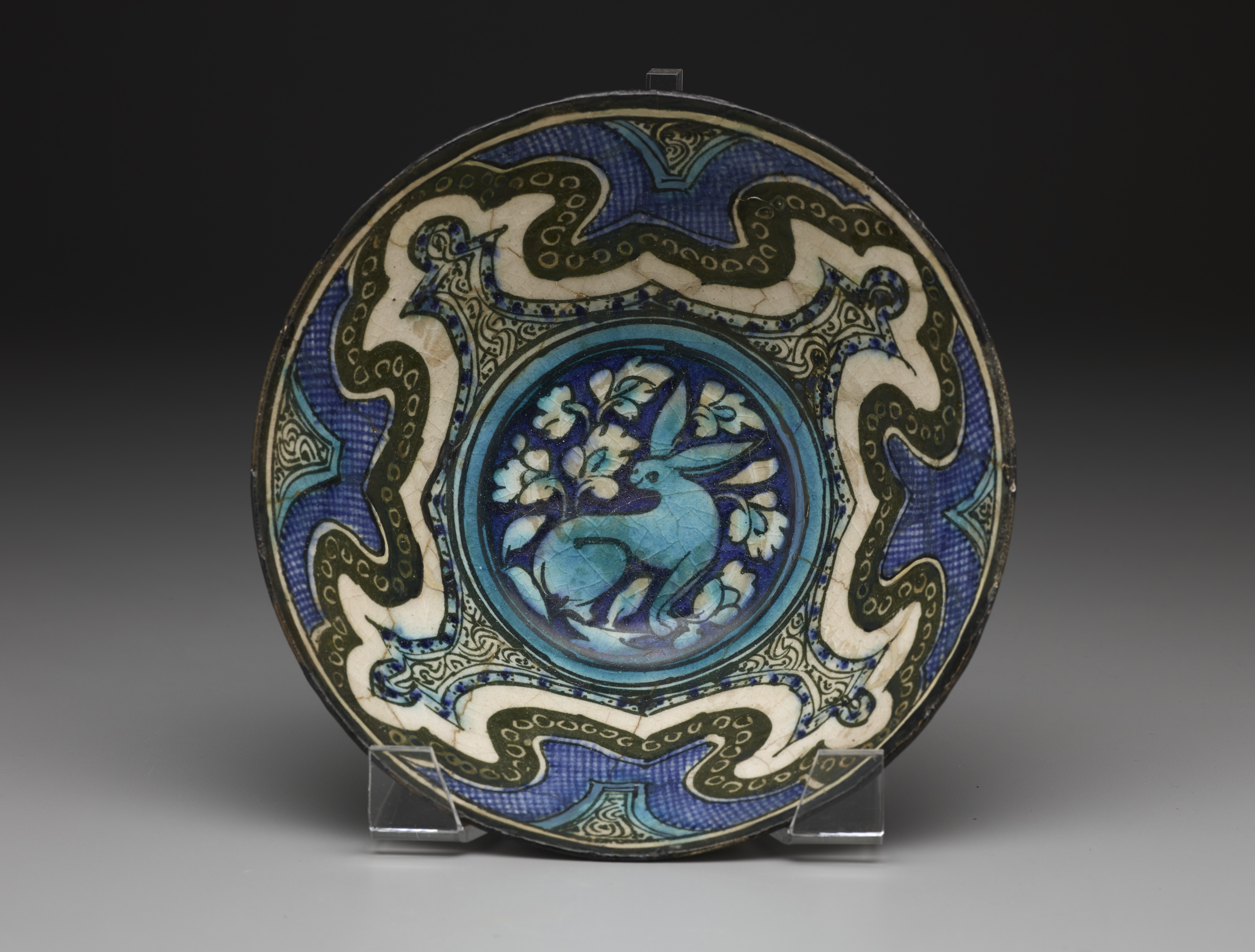
Bowl with rabbit. 14th century. The Keir Collection of Islamic Art

Sultanabad ware is a type of Persian pottery developed in Sultanabad, Iran, during the course of Ilkhanid rule in Persia.

== Background ==
The Mongols, having conquered Persia during the early 13th century, sacked the Abbasid capital of Baghdad in 1258, establishing the Ilkhanate state. The Ilkhanate period (1258–1339) marked the introduction of a number of stylistic, iconographic and decorative innovations in Persian ceramics. These innovations were influenced by Chinese ceramics and Far Eastern textiles. Further, the technical proficiency of Persian ceramic art was advanced through collaboration among craftsmen from different traditions.

== Ware ==
A 1930s archeological survey of villages in the vicinity of Sultanabad, Iran uncovered that the region was a major center of Ilkhanid ceramic industry. Ilkhanid ceramics distinguished by their heavy potting, along with thick translucent glaze were henceforth called Sultanabad ware. Sultanabad ware includes Colored Ground wares, ʿErāq wares, Black underglaze painted turquoise glazed wares, as well as blue and black Panel wares. Common motifs in Sultanabad ware include stylized blue and green foliage, pheasants or other birds, hares, deer. Mongol figures (often wearing feather caps) are rather more rare. The use of pseudo-inscriptions around the rims of the vessels and the Mongolian decorative themes, hint at the fact that the buyers of those wares were Turco-Mongolians. Although produced on a large scale, detailed and well preserved pieces are rare. ʿErāq wares showcasing the introduction of a pale blue underglaze colorants being a notable example.

== Gallery ==
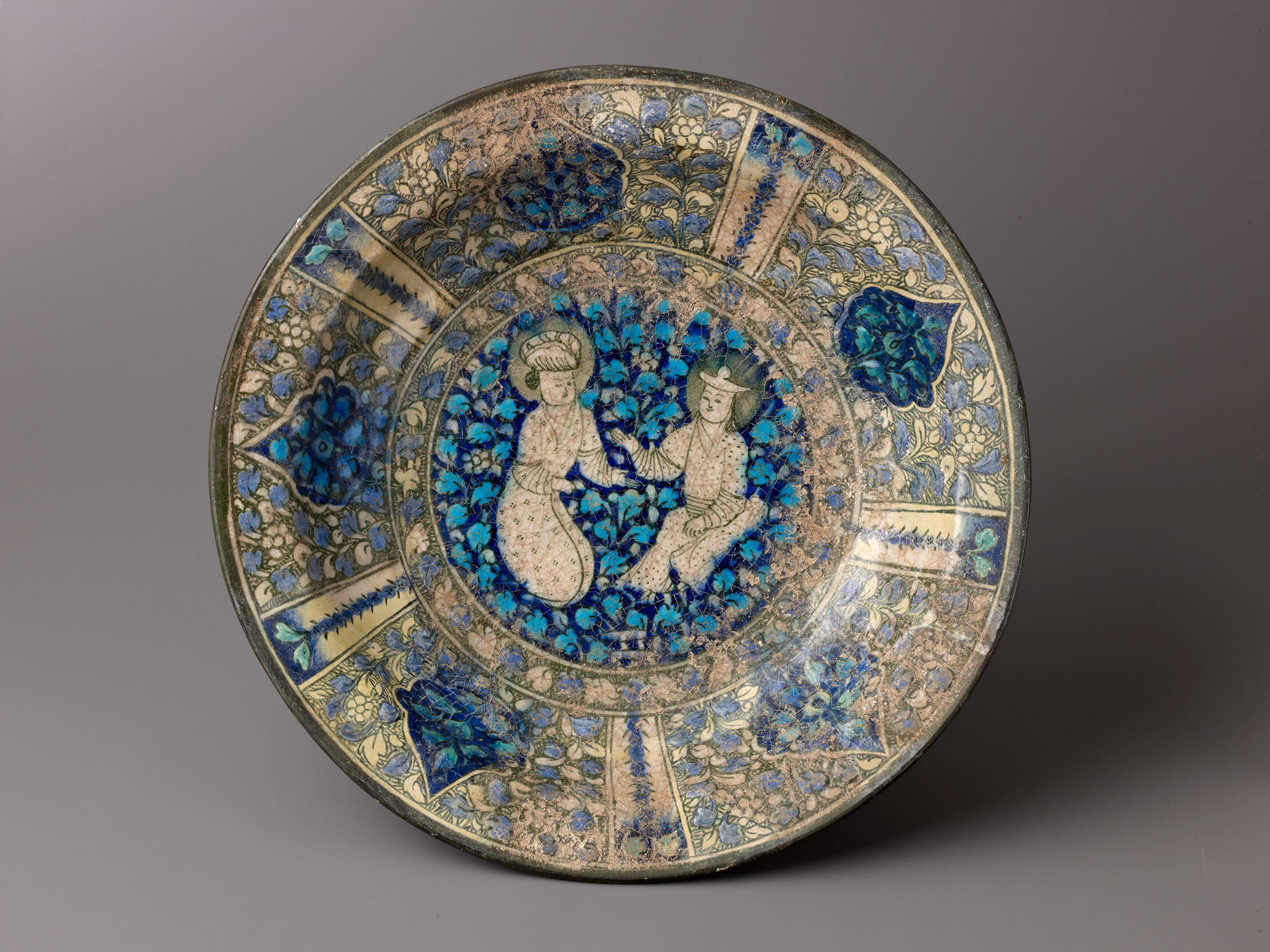
Bowl with Iranian and his Mongol overlord

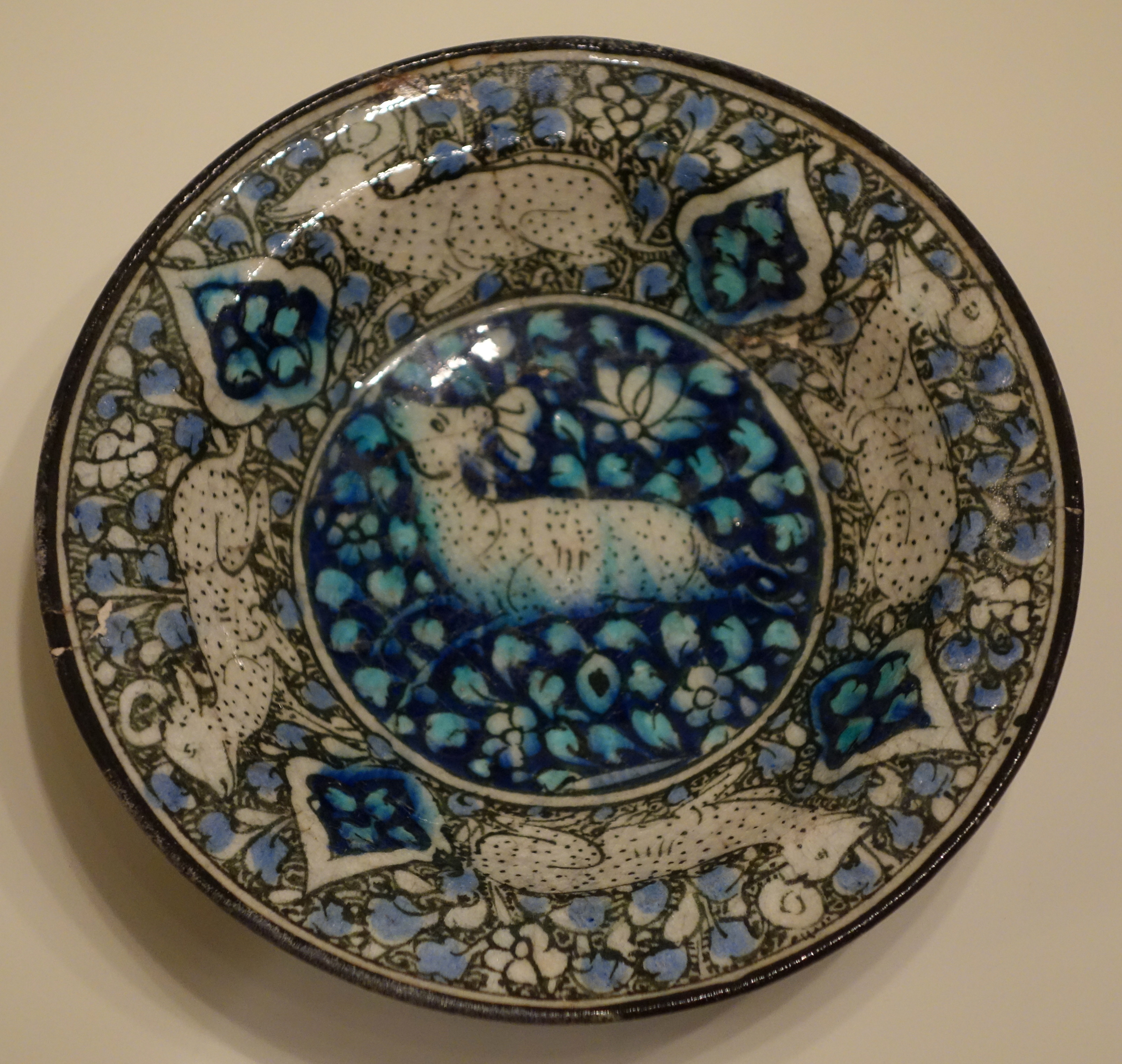
Dish with running quadrupeds

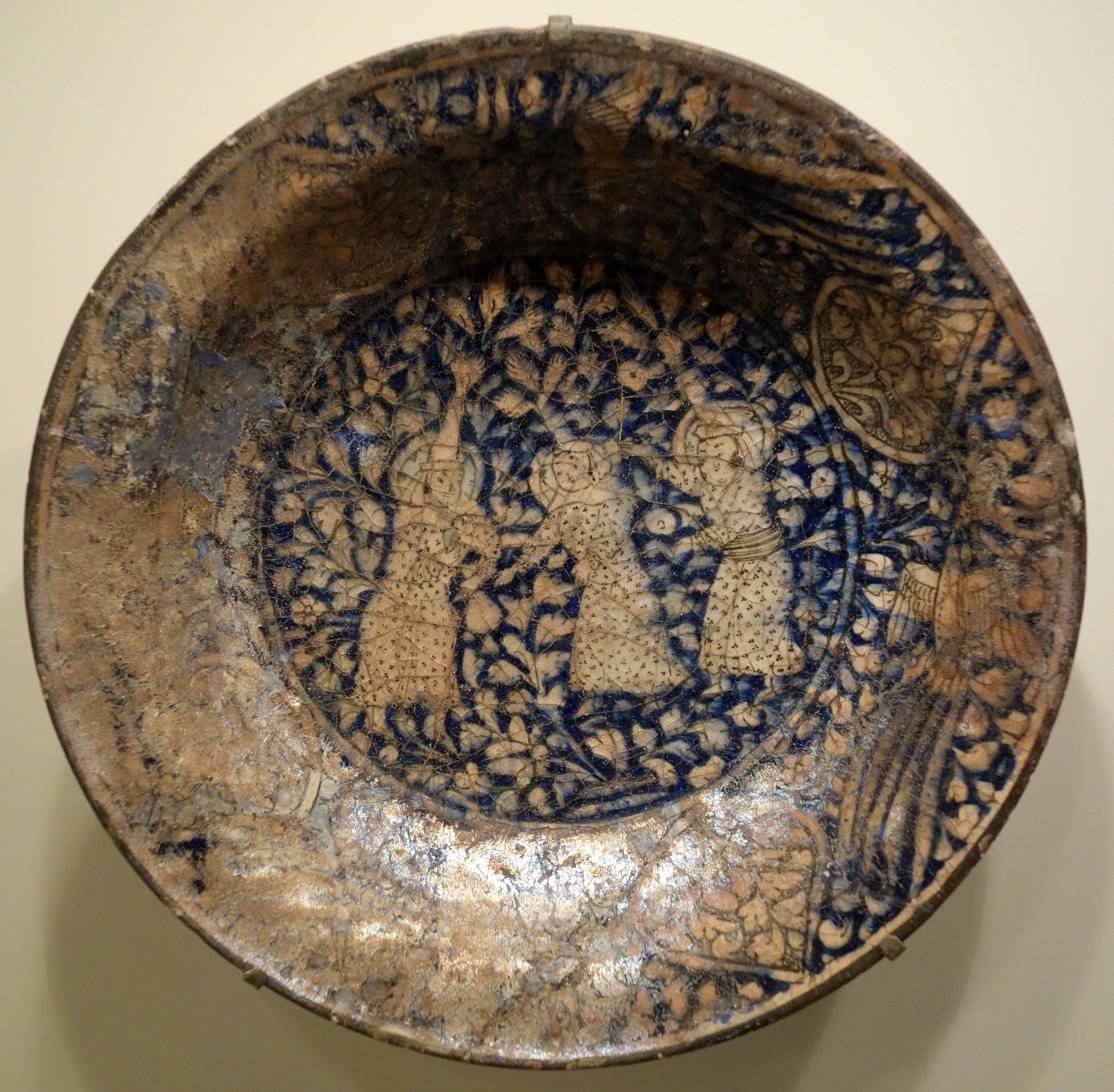
Bowl with dancing dervishes

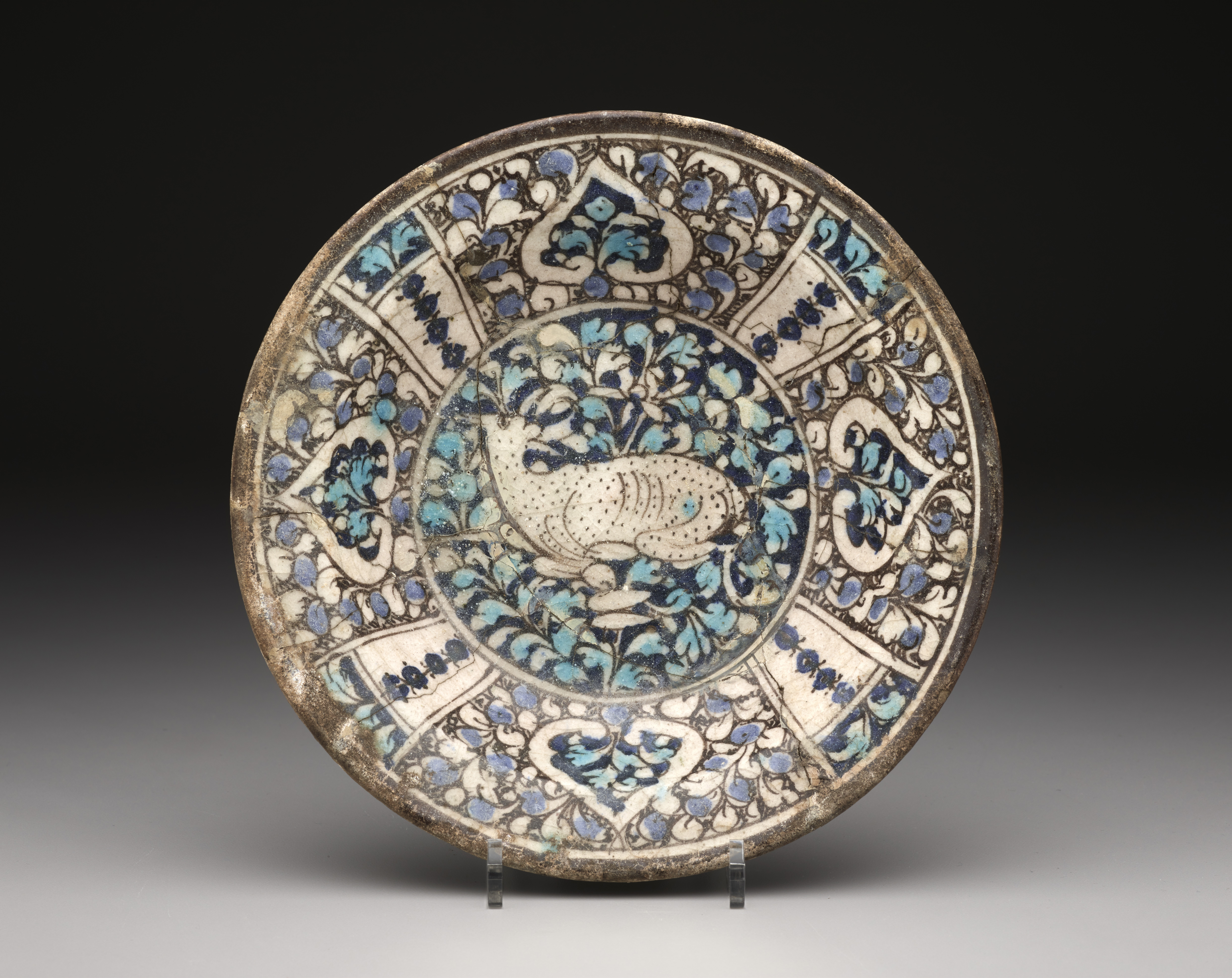
Bowl with stag

Calouste Gulbenkian Museum

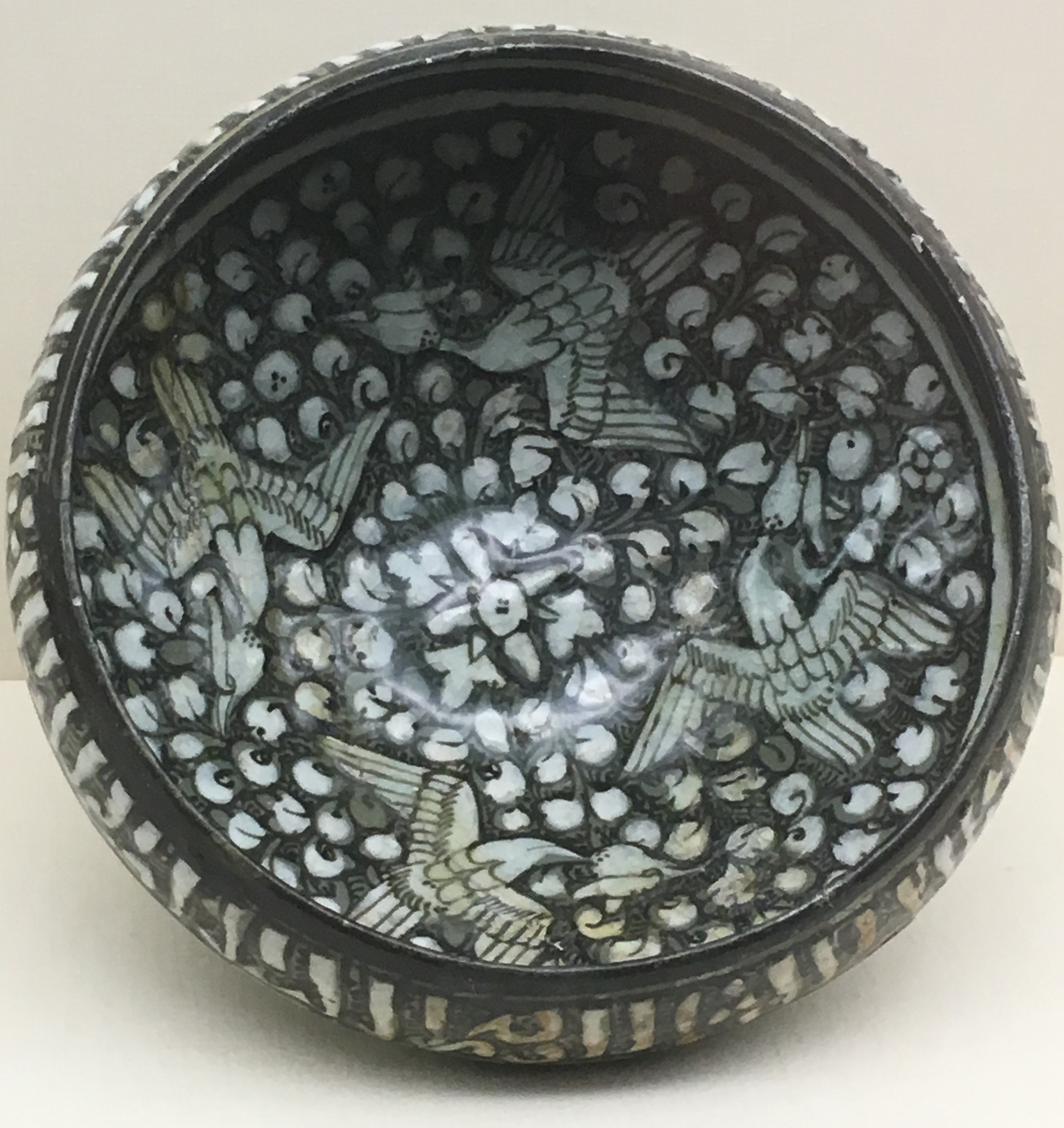
Bowl with birds in flight

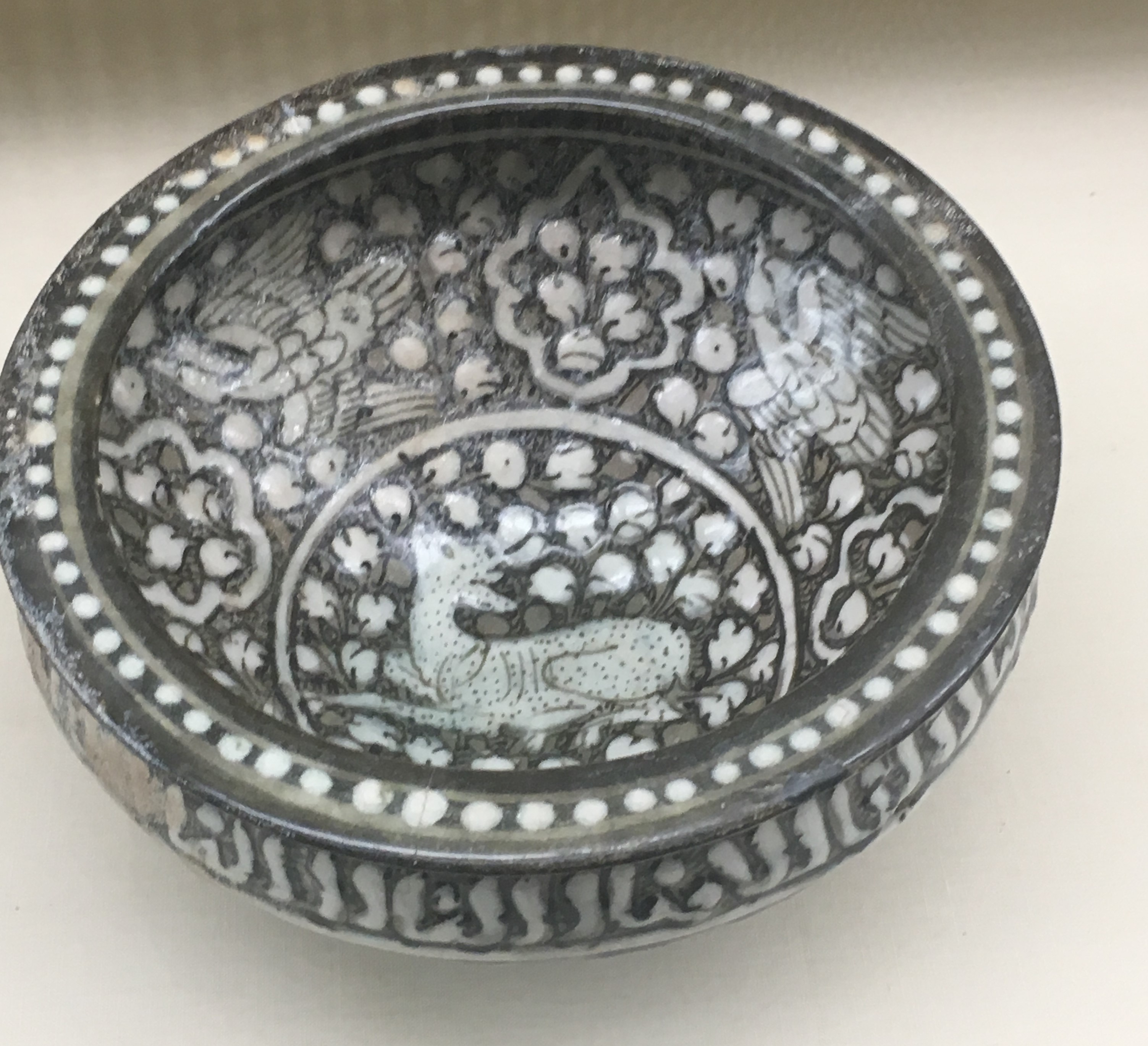
Bowl with deer and four geese

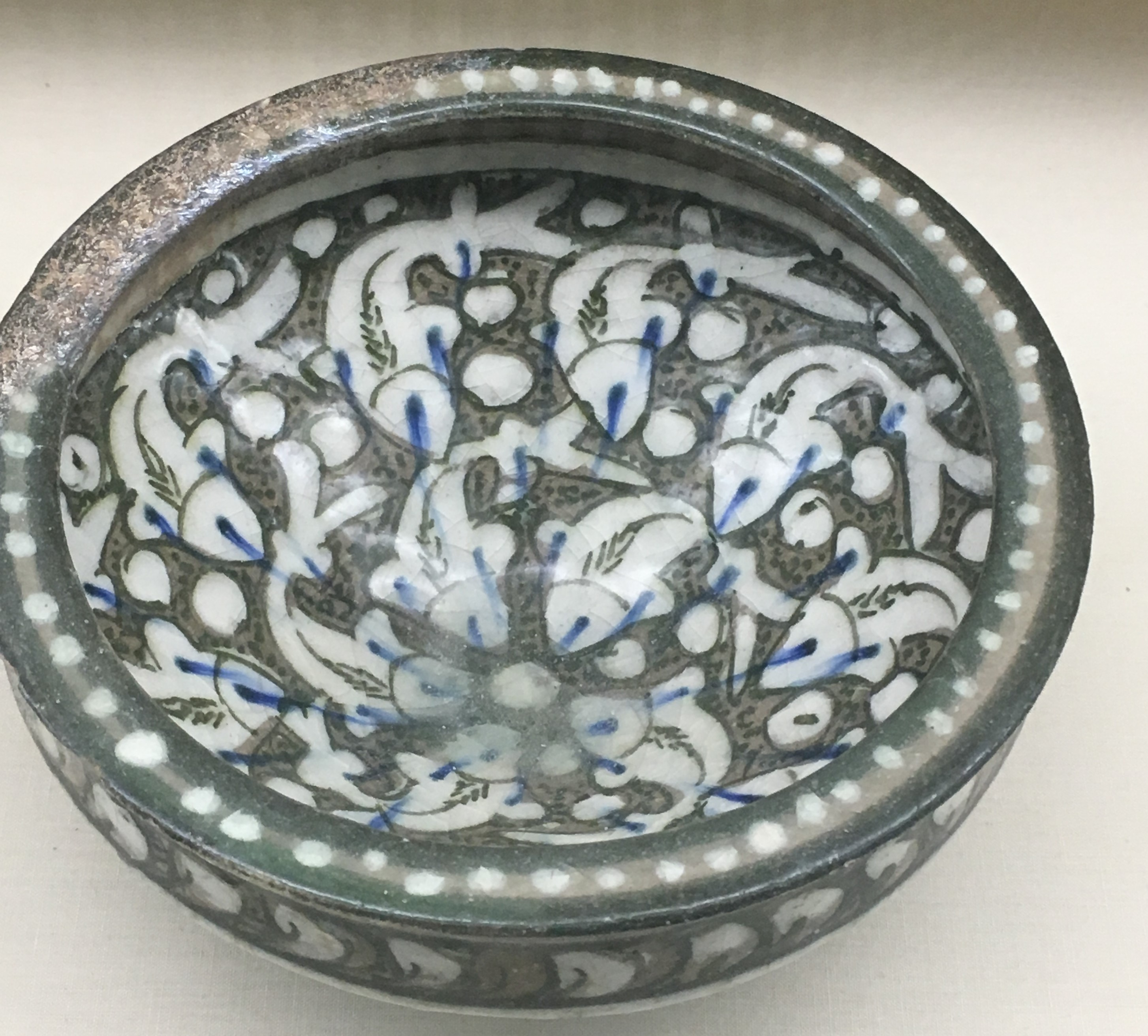
Bowl with fish

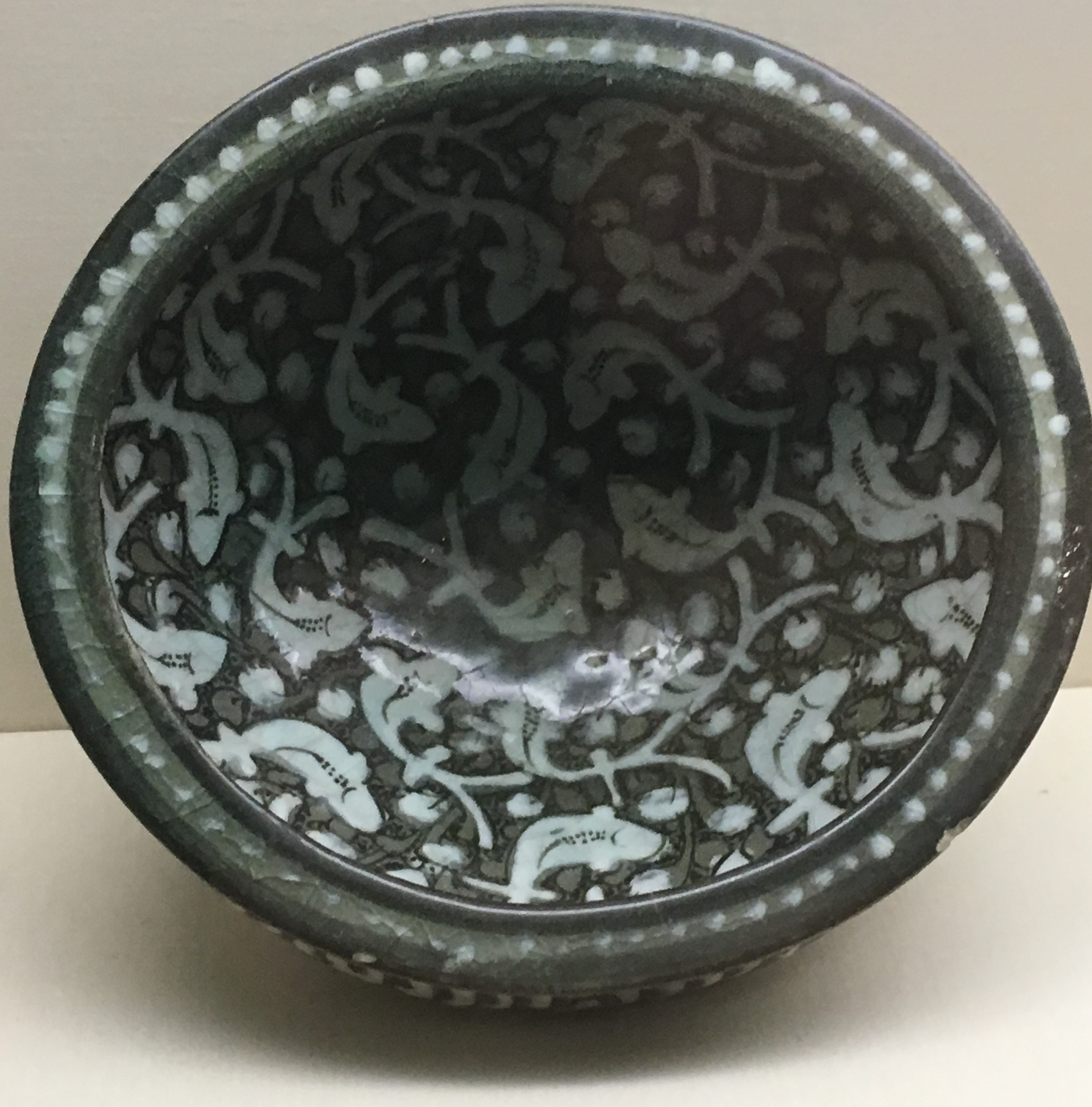
Deep bowl with fish

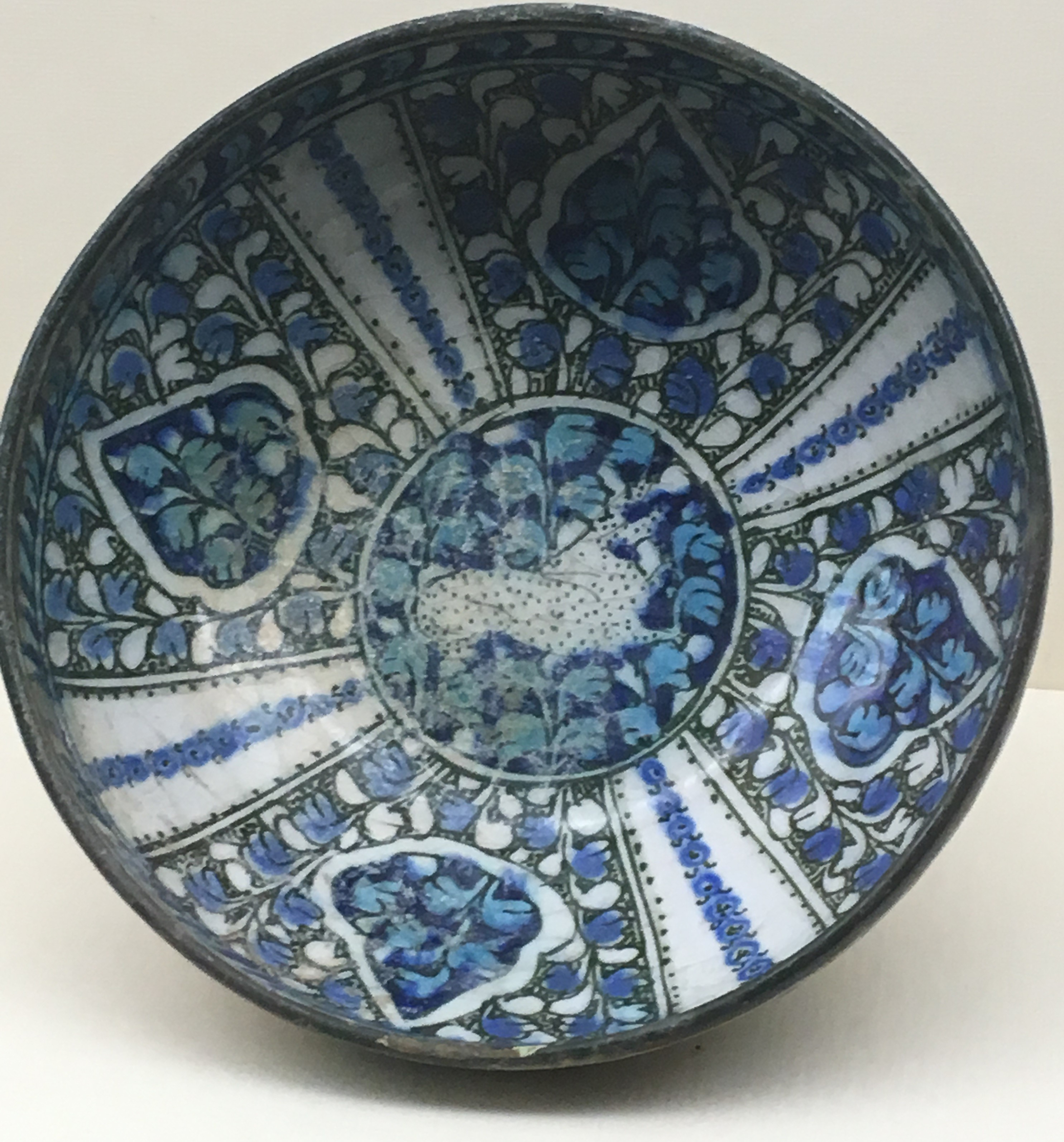
Bowl with deer in a garden

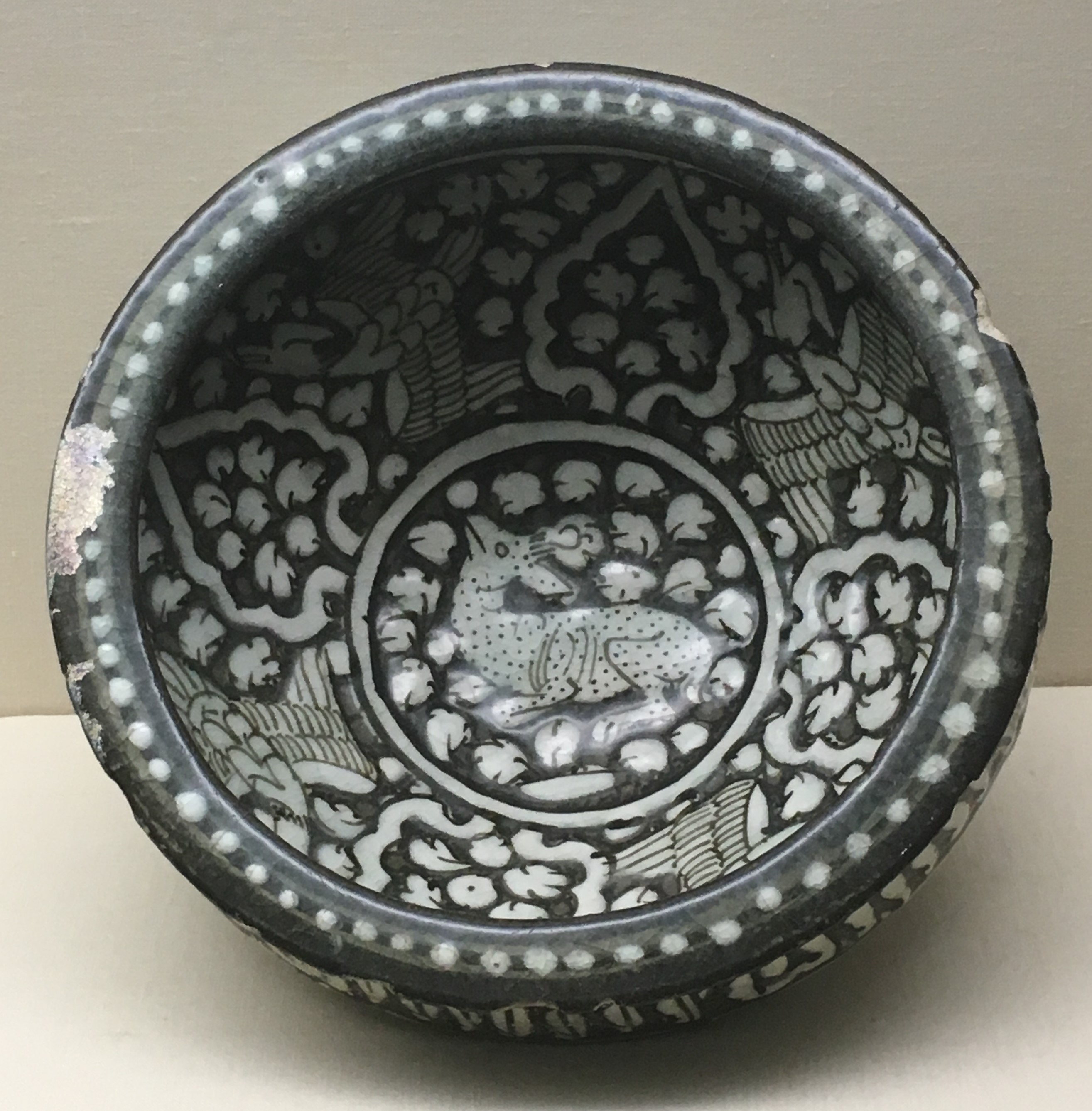
Deep bowl with birds and a gazelle

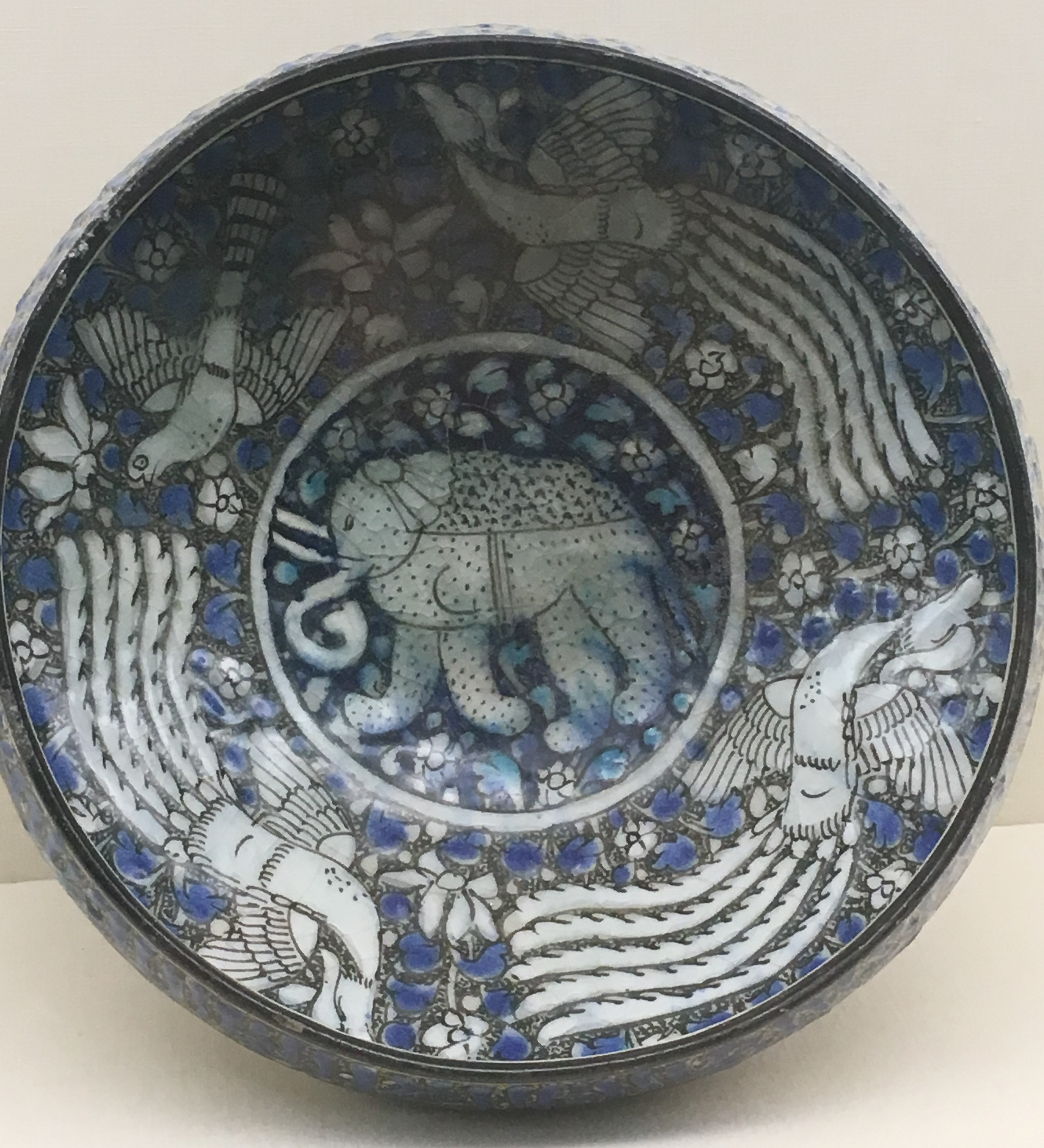
Bowl with elephant and three phoenixes

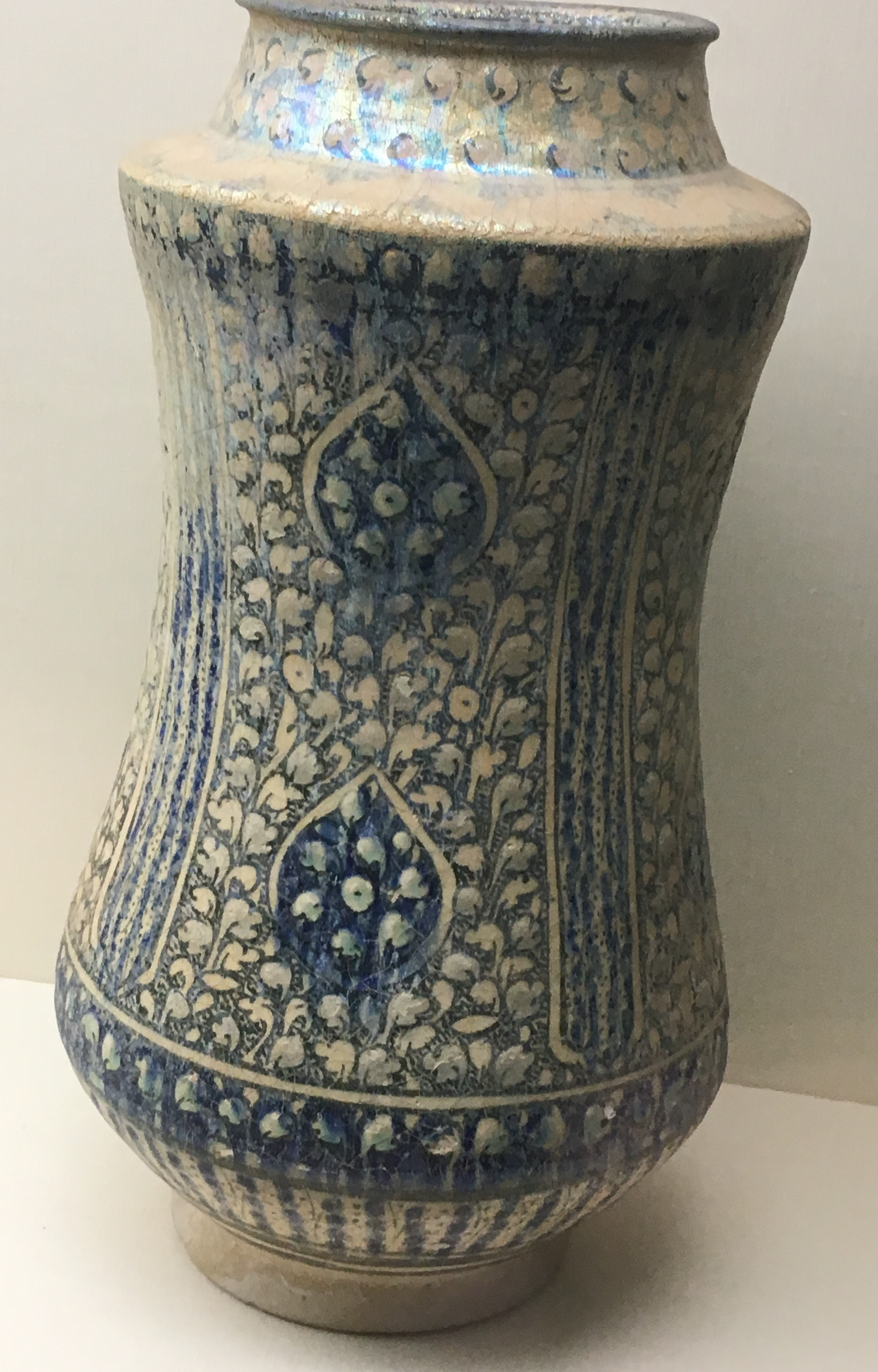
Apothecary jar (albarelo)

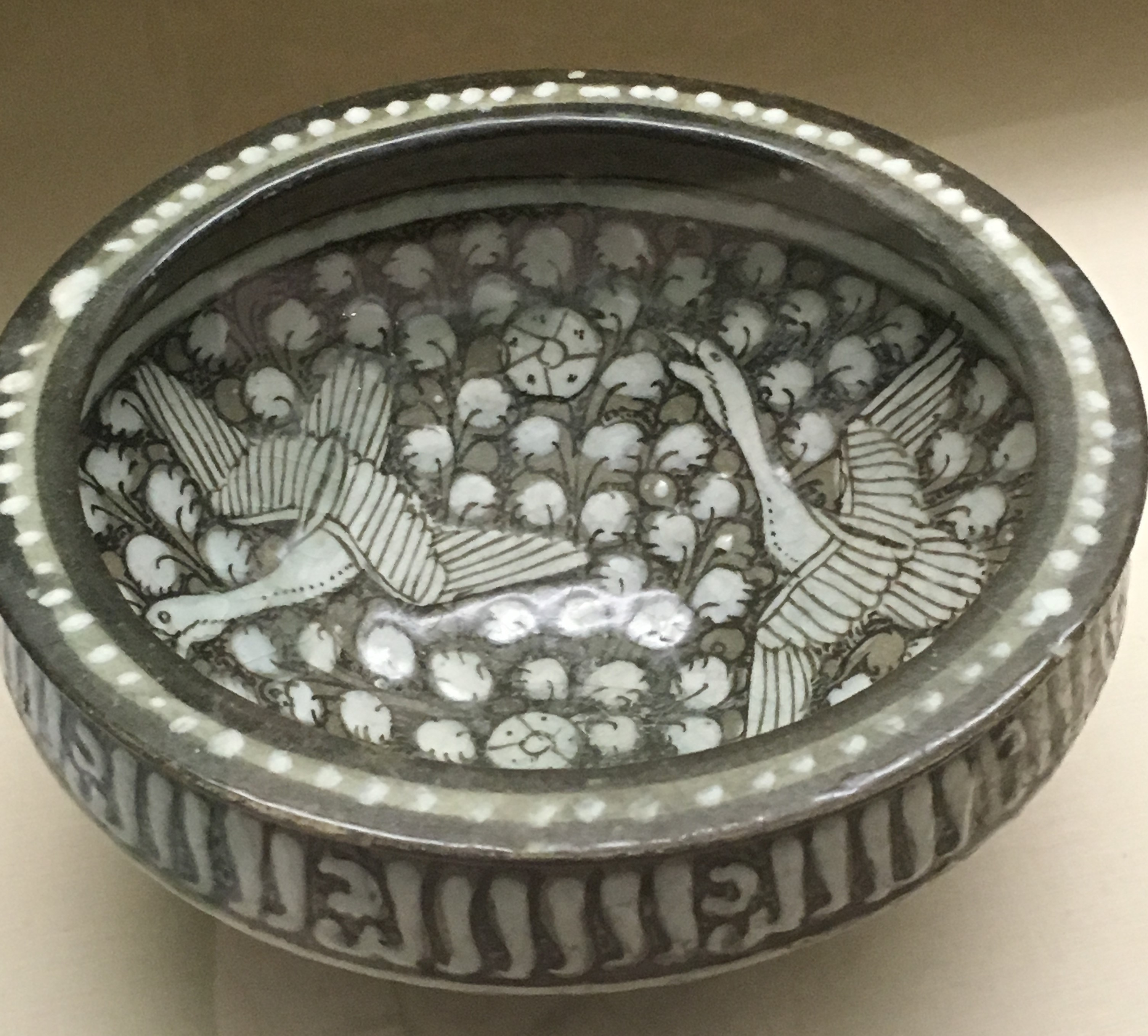
Deep bowl with birds

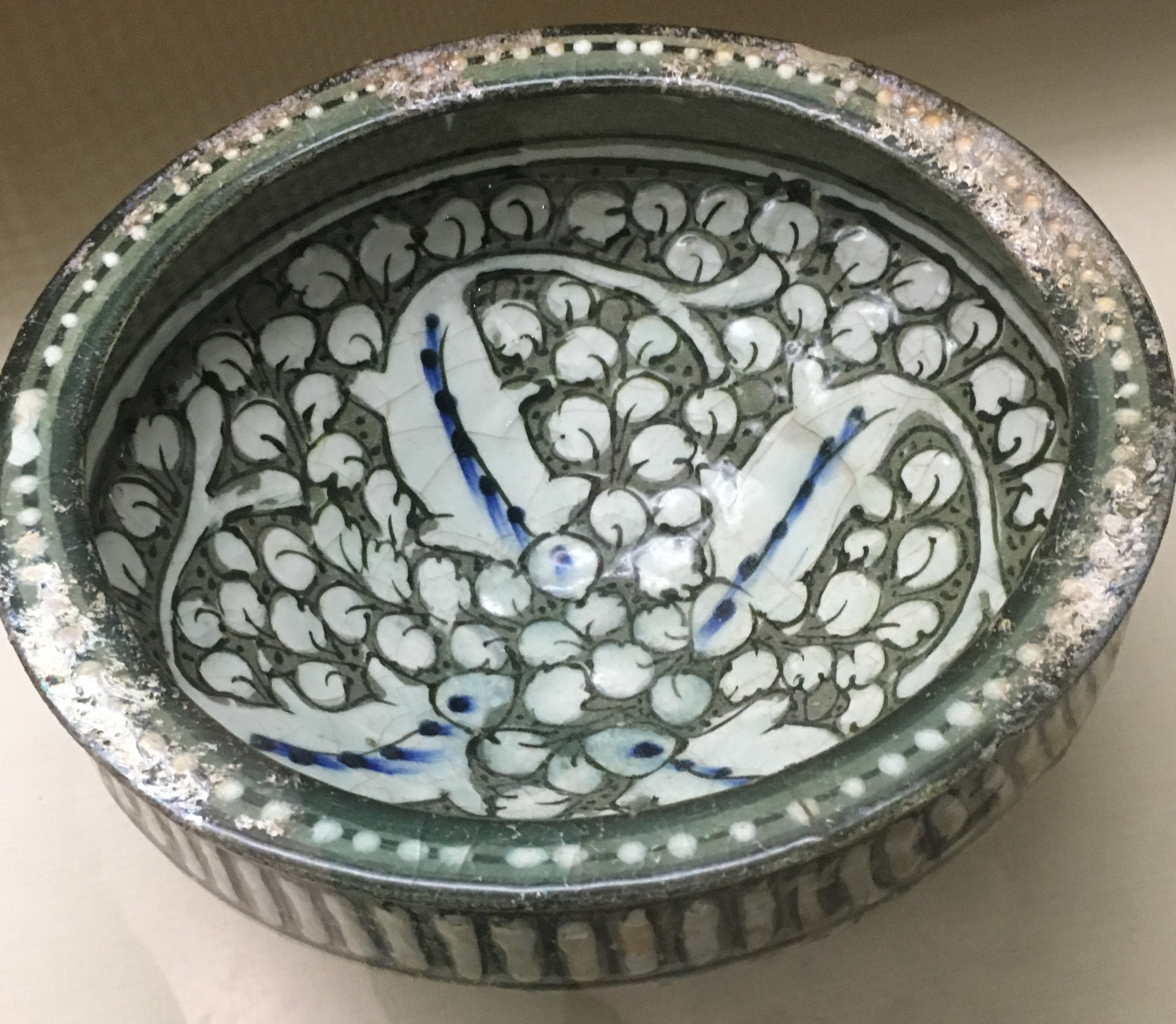
Deep bowl with reptiles

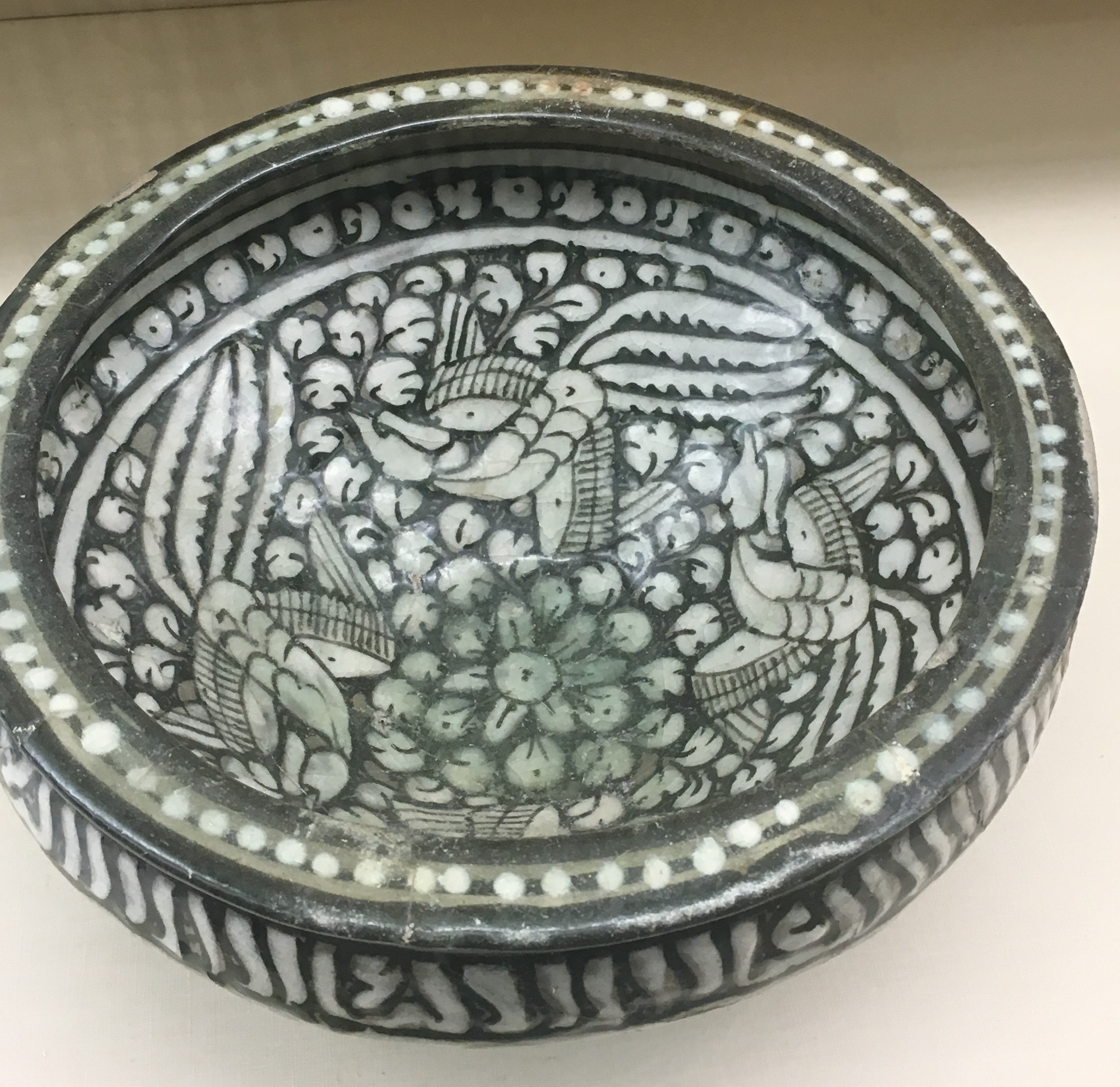
Bowl with four phoenixes

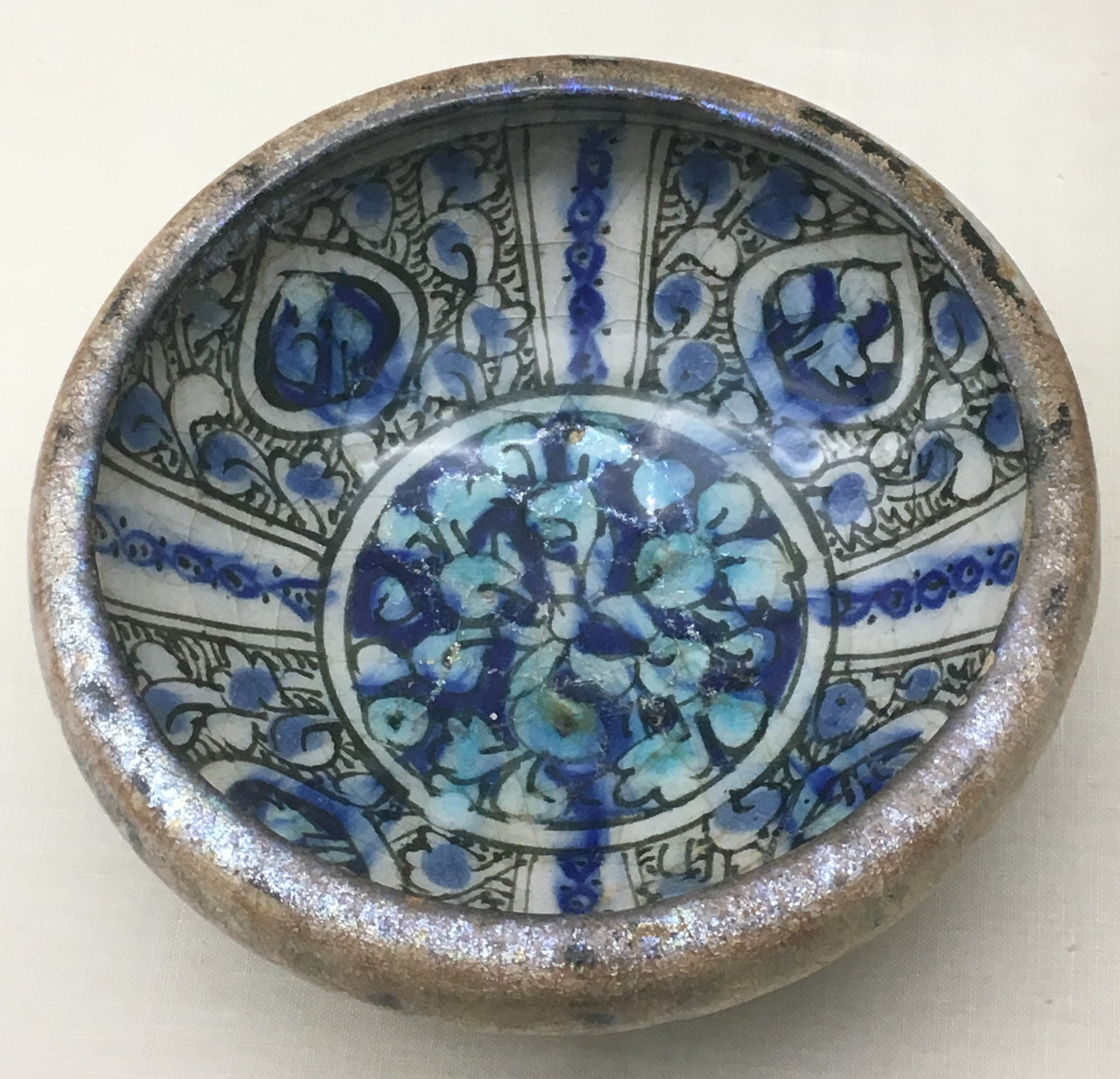
Small bowl with lotus flowers
