= Diane Lees =

Dame Diane Elizabeth Lees, DBE (born 1964) was the first female Director-General of the Imperial War Museum. Prior to succeeding Sir Robert Crawford on 1 October 2008, she had been the director of the V&A Museum of Childhood in Bethnal Green, London since 2000. She is also chair of the National Museum Directors' Council.

Lees began her career as an historic buildings researcher before moving into managing exhibitions, education and interpretation. She was involved in the rescue and relocation of a hat block manufacturer's workshop in central Manchester; the recovery and display of Henry VIII's flagship Mary Rose in Portsmouth Harbour and re-display of the Nelson Galleries at the Royal Naval Museum.

Lees was also involved in creating SPECTRUM, the UK standard for recording information about museum collections, and was responsible for the creation of the multi-award-winning Galleries of Justice in Nottingham, the UK's only museum of law. She is a trustee of the Story Museum in Oxford, a trustee of Discover in East London and Vice Chair of the Association of Independent Museums, and was Institutional Vice President of the Museums Association.

Lees was appointed Commander of the Order of the British Empire (CBE) in the 2015 New Year Honours for services to museums, and Dame Commander of the Order of the British Empire (DBE) in the 2022 New Year Honours for services to museums and cultural heritage.
