= West Square =

Historic garden square in south London

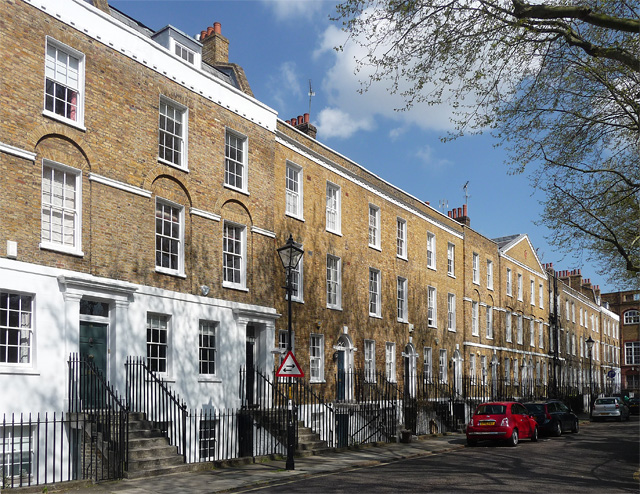
- 6–19 West Square
- Interactive map of West Square
- Location: Lambeth & Southwark, London, England
- Postal code: SE11
- Coordinates: 51°29′43″N 0°6′20″W
- North: A302
- East: Hayles Street
- South: Austral Street; Orient Street
- West: Imperial War Museum

Construction
- Inauguration: 1791

Other
- Known for: J. A. R. Newlands; Shutter telegraph

West Square is a historic square in south London, England, just south from St George's Road. The square is within the London Borough of Southwark, but as it is located in postcode SE11, it is commonly said to be in Lambeth.

== Location ==
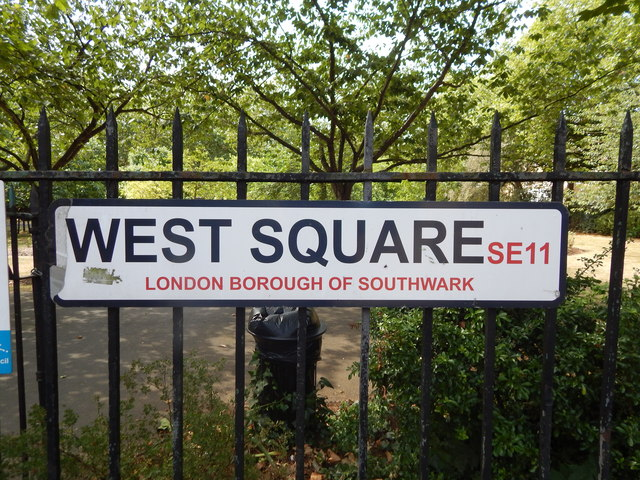
Street sign in the square

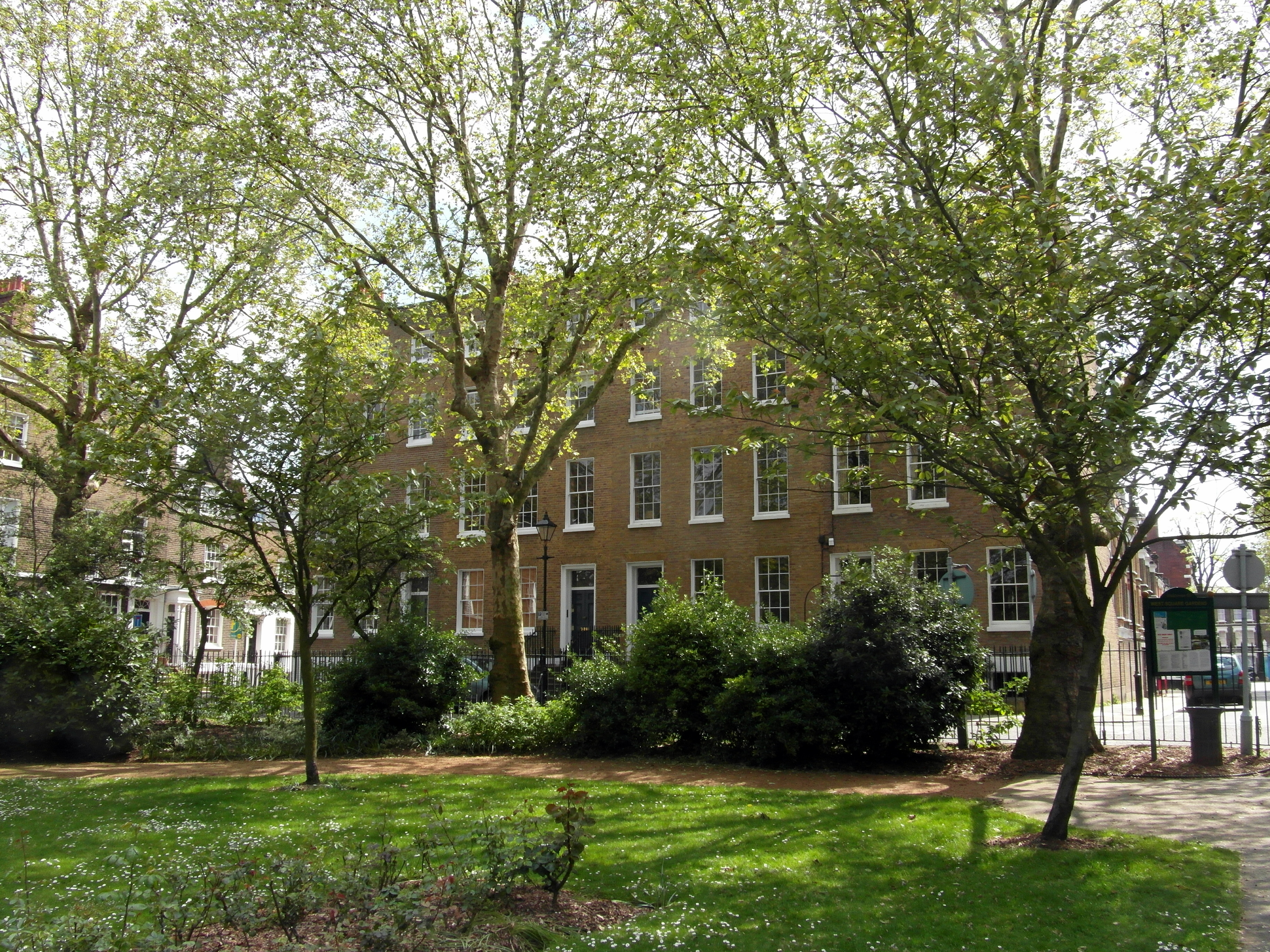
View of West Square from the gardens

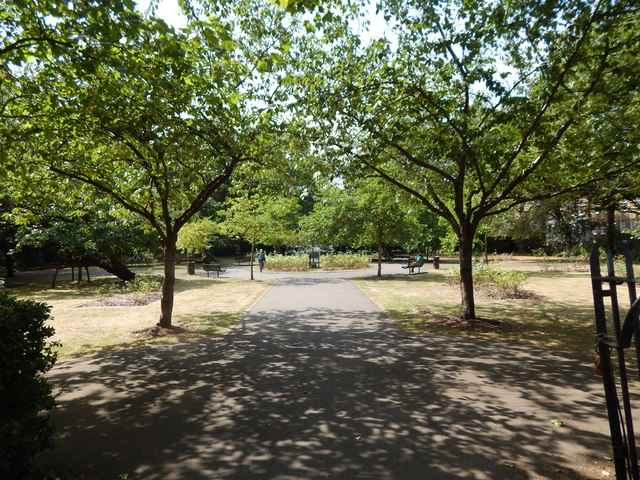
The gardens at West Square

Immediately to the west is the Imperial War Museum (formerly the Bethlem Royal Hospital). To the south is the Imperial War Museum Annex (which used to be an orphans' home) in Austral Street.

The terraced houses in the square surround a communal garden that is open to the public during the day but locked at night. The square forms part of a larger conservation area.

== History ==
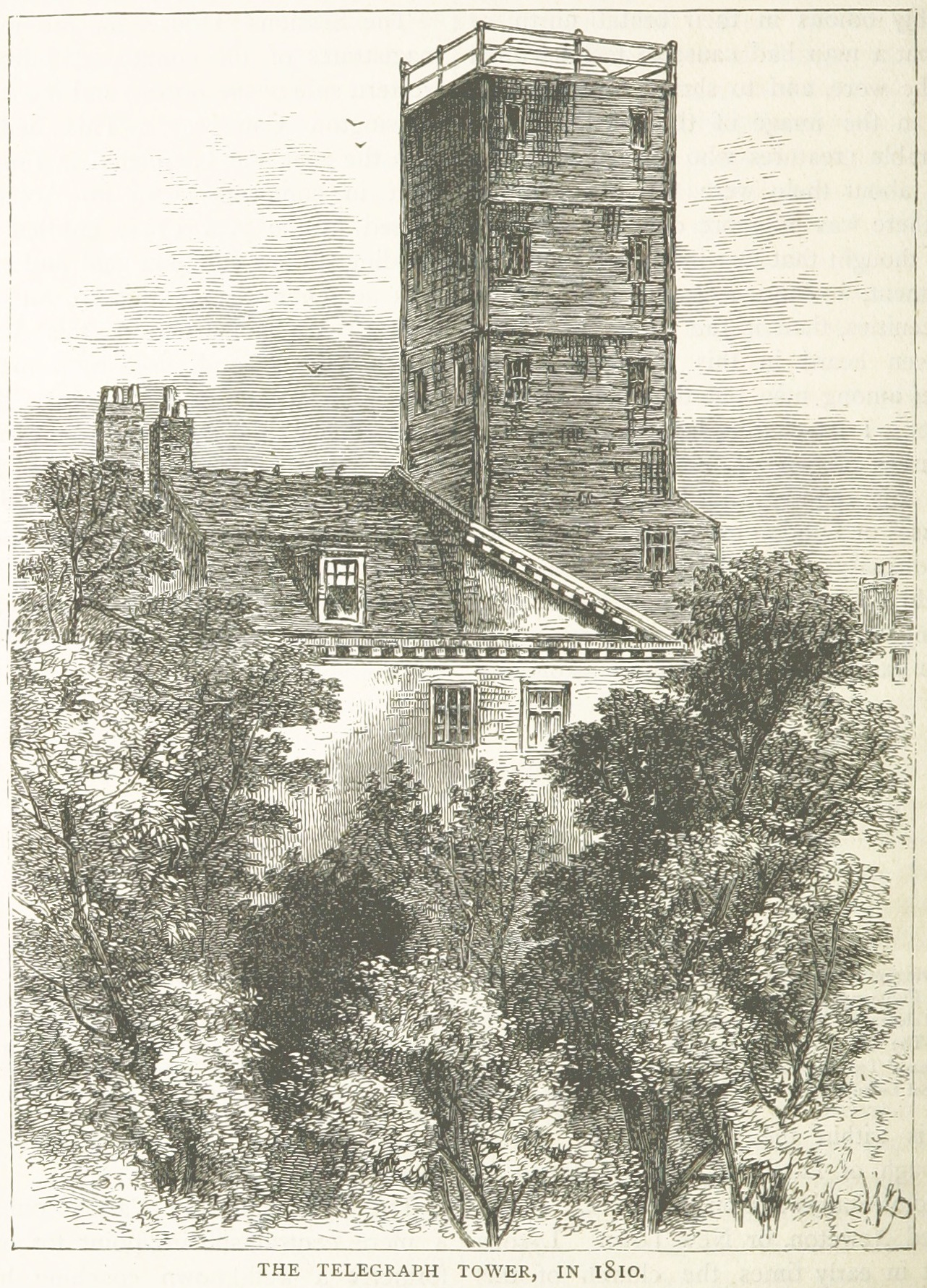
The Telegraph Tower, in 1810

West Square has the following entry in Volume XXV of the Survey of London, published in 1955 by the then London County Council:

"The largest of the several plots of ground in St George's Fields which belonged in the mid-18th century to Henry Bartelote and then to the West family was the close lying south of St George's Road, between Moulton's Close (the Imperial War Museum) and the ground belonging to Hayle's estate.— Colonel Temple West died in 1784, leaving his freehold estate in St George's Fields to his wife Jane during her life, and after her death, to his eldest son, Temple, in tail male. They were empowered to make leases of up to 99 years, and in 1791 they granted building leases of the side of West Square to Thomas Kendall and James Hedger [see below]. Most of the houses on the north, east and west sides of the square were completed and occupied by 1794, and the majority still remain; they are nearly all three-storied. Nos, 25–28 on the south side, built a few years later, are a storey higher. These have rectangular patterned door fanlights. The houses on the west side of the square are grouped formally; the two centre houses, which are surmounted by a pediment, and those adjoining them on either side, are set forward slightly as are the two houses at each end of the terrace. The open space in the centre of the square is now maintained by Southwark Borough Council.

In 1812, the Admiralty erected a tower on No. 36, on the east side of the square, for the shutter telegraph apparatus used to convey messages between Whitehall and New Cross, and thence to and from Chatham and Sheerness. [The accompanying print suggests that this was a wooden, four-storey structure and — incidentally — that Nos. 36 and 37 were originally surmounted by a pediment matching that on the west side of the square.] Robert Barker (1739–1806), who painted panoramas and exhibited them in Leicester Square, erected a round wooden building for his work in West Square. He lived at No. 14 from 1799 to 1806, and his widow continued to occupy the house after his death. His son Henry, who assisted him in painting the panoramas, lived at No. 13 from 1802, when he married the daughter of William Bligh, commander of the Bounty, until 1824 [Bligh himself lived for a period along Lambeth Road]. No. 15 was occupied in 1804–09 by Henry Perkins (1778–1855), book collector and a partner in the firm of Barclay, Perkins, brewers.

James Hedger (see above) occupied a house in South (now Austral) Street. He had a garden on the west side extending along the back of West Square, and mews and stables on the opposite side of the street. His son James lived in the square at No. 45 from 1808 until his death in 1812, when he was succeeded by his brother Robert. Another brother, William, occupied No. 31 from 1807 until 1819."

In the 1800s, the square was used to house some staff at the Bethlehem Royal Hospital (now the Imperial War Museum). In addition, there were Steward's Quarters in the northeast corner of the Hospital grounds. King Edward's Schools (closed and demolished in the 1930s) occupied the eastern side, together with an area of drying posts. The whole eastern side of the old Hospital grounds is now given over to sports facilities.

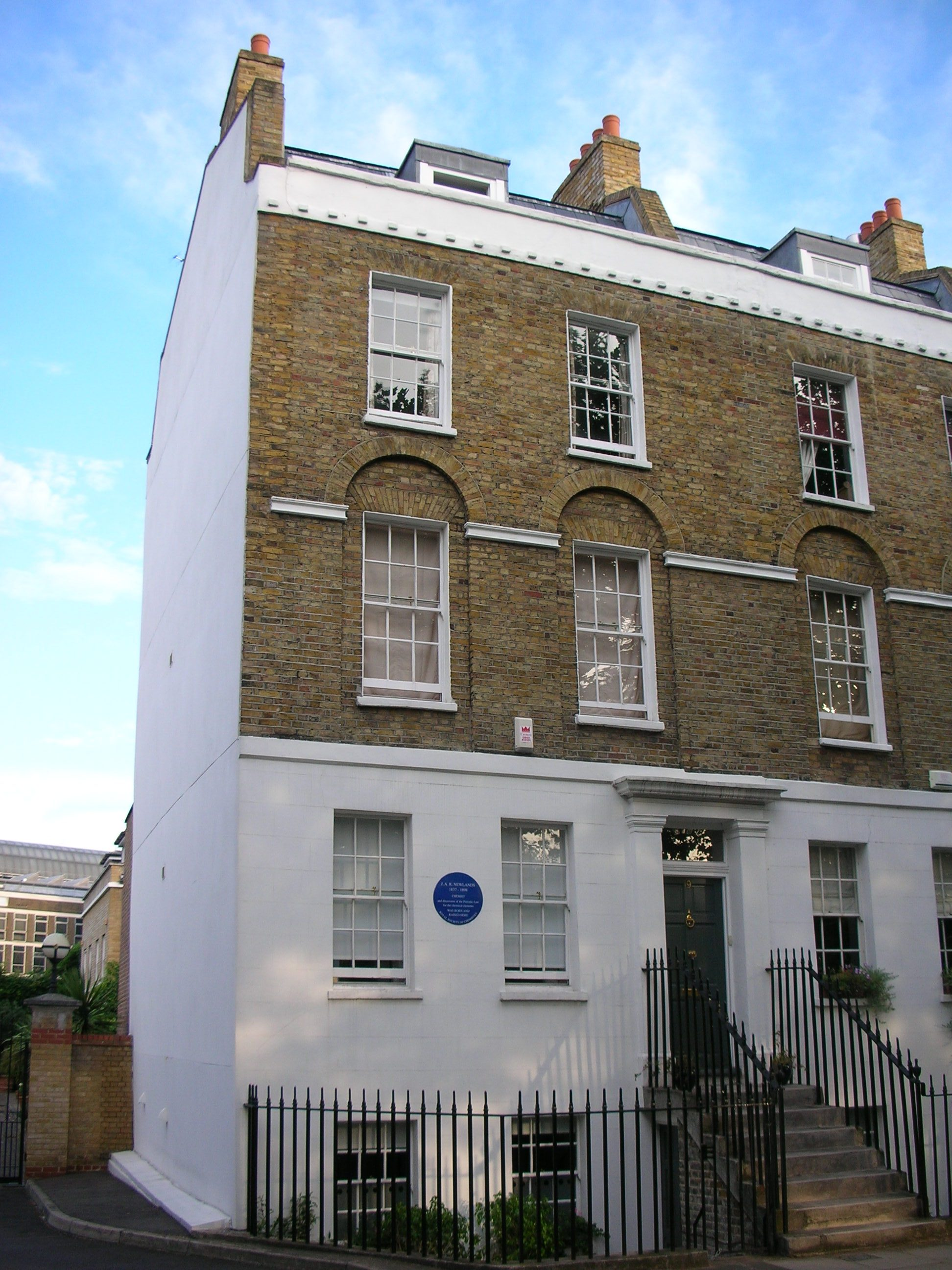
The house in which the chemist J. A. R. Newlands was born and raised, in West Square

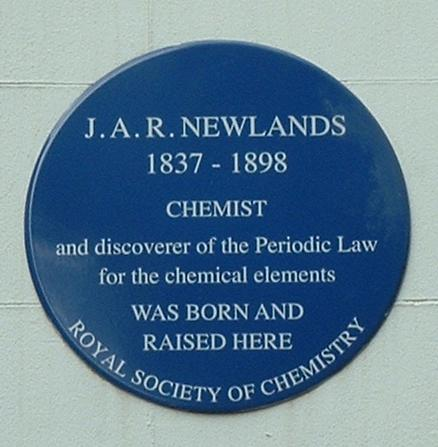
The blue plaque on the house in which Newlands was born and raised, in West Square, installed by the Royal Society of Chemistry

J. A. R. Newlands (1837–1898), the Victorian chemist who discovered the Periodic Law for the chemical elements, was born and raised in No. 19. A blue plaque, installed by the Royal Society of Chemistry, commemorates Newlands on the front of the house.

Charlotte Sharman (1832–1929), a Christian Congregational church philanthropist, founded a girls' orphanage, on 6 May 1867, on West Square, in a rented house next door to her parents' house. By 1871, Sharman had expanded her operations to include a nursery branch at 32 West Square, one for 5–8 year olds at 23 West Square, an infirmary at 44 West Square and a large house known as The Mansion at 14 South Street (now Austral Street), which housed 93 residents. Through donations from her communities, Sharman was able to purchase the site of 14 South Street (now Austral Street) and between 1875 and 1884, a new orphanage was built, known as the Orphans' Nest. Sharman opened several orphanages around the country, including Gravesend, Newton Abbott, Tunbridge Wells and Hastings. The Orphans' Nest in Southwark was used as a girls' orphanage until 1929/30, when the orphanage moved to Newlands Park, Sydenham. Charlotte Sharman died on 5 December 1929, aged 97. The orphanage building on Austral Street (formerly South Street) was purchased and became All Saints' Hospital and then, in the late 1980s, was purchased by the Imperial War Museums as the All Saints Annexe, to house staff offices, archive stores and a public reading room. In 2020, the former All Saints Annexe was being redeveloped as a studio for EPR Architects, with a scheduled completion date of February 2022.

In 1884–5, the Charlotte Sharman School was built on the northwest side, named after its founder, a Christian philanthropist. Construction of the school — which is still located there — required the demolition of some thirty houses. Part of the site is now occupied by the Siobhan Davies Dance Centre.

As a young child, Charlie Chaplin (1889–1977) lived at 39 West Square for a short period. He later recalled:

West Square! At the back of the Bedlam Lunatic Asylum. This is as far back as I can remember as a child. It was there, somewhere around the age of three, we lived in a large house.

At the end of the 19th century, the garden in the square was threatened with building development, but there was a campaign to keep it. In 1909, the freehold was bought for some £4,000 by the London County Council and the Metropolitan Borough of Southwark. They enlarged and restored the garden, which was then opened for public use in 1910. The Metropolitan Public Gardens Association's landscape gardener Madeline Agar laid out the gardens and restored the earlier 1813 cruciform layout. The square was scheduled to protect it under the London Squares Preservation Act 1931. However, after the Second World War, it was proposed that the buildings should be demolished and the area added to Geraldine Mary Harmsworth Park. This was blocked by the Civic Amenities Act 1967 and instead, the square became a conservation area.

The terrace of five houses in the northwest corner of the square were demolished in c.1970, and replaced by modern townhouses designed to blend in with the original Georgian architecture (the corner house had at one point been converted into a pub, The City Arms). The west side of the square was also much-altered, with pairs of houses being run together to create four lateral flats in each property. In 1997–8, and except for numbers 10 and 11, the terrace was reconverted to single houses. Overall, the square remains largely intact and of historic interest, a fact reflected in the 1972 Grade II listing of the east, south and wide sides.

The square is traversed by a taxi in the fictional novel 2666 by Chilean author Roberto Bolaño. On page 74 it mentions that a taxi passes through Brook Drive, Geraldine St, Austral St through to St George's Road.

== See also ==
- Lorrimore Square, also in Southwark
