= Charlotte Sharman =

Charlotte Sharman (1832–1929) was a Christian woman who ran orphanages for girls in West Square Southwark, Gravesend, Hampton, and Tunbridge Wells. She, in the course of her lifetime, cared for and educated over 1,200 destitute children. The lady was an apostle of practical religion.

== Youth ==
Sharman was born on 19 May 1832 in Southwark, called The Borough by Londoners of the time, and was the younger daughter of Frederick (Thomas) and Phoebe Sharman. Her year of birth was the same year as George Müller, another director of orphanages, arrived in Bristol. It was to be the place where Müller began an inspiring project that caught the imagination of the young Charlotte.

She and her sister Phoebe were baptised in the Congregational Church in Walpole Road. Her father was a general labourer, and in the 1841 census he and his family were recorded as living at Union Place, Newington, in the borough of Lambeth. He worked in a shoe factory at the time. Her mother was the daughter of William West, a gardener who won a silver trophy award for his development of the garden in the centre of West Square. West Square was to become the main place of his granddaughter's orphanages.

As a child Sharman was physically very frail, and her mother educated her at home because of her delicate constitution.

== Beginnings ==
After her home education Sharman worked as a governess with her sister in a school set up by their parents. In 1861 she lodged with Phoebe in 148 Windmill Street, Gravesend, but after her sister's marriage she could no longer carry on teaching. Around this time she became aware of the plight of orphan children.

This was highlighted by Charles Dickens who vividly portrayed the horrors of the workhouse, the lot of poor children, and the evil of child slavery. Sharman began to take girls from off the streets and those bound for the workhouses and put them with families of friends that she knew. She had 13 girls in various places that she cared for. Sharman provided them with clothes and paid the foster parents to look after them. At this time she had no intention of starting her own homes and passed on around 30 girls to George Müller for admittance to his homes in Bristol. Mary Ann was one of the first she cared for, a child of 11 who was living in appalling conditions with her paralysed and fever-ridden grandmother.

== Homes ==
The idea of a home to care for her girls came from the Reverend Samuel Martin, minister of Westminster Chapel where Sharman was a member. He suggested she write a pamphlet about her need of a home to care for girls. There were other homes around but entrance was competitive, and a great deal of influence, votes, and money was often needed to gain admittance to them. In response to the pamphlet finance came in, and on 6 May 1867 she rented the house next to her mother in West Square and opened her first home for 13 girls. The home provided "home and domestic training to destitute orphan girls". Within three months the house was filled with 18 children aged three to 13 years old. By 1870 three houses were being occupied in and off West Square. Another was added that summer to make it four.

In 1871 the census indicates that the nursery branch of the orphanage was located at 32, West Square, with 36 residents. A second house in 23, West Square, held 5- to 8-year-olds, again with 36 residents. At 22 West Square Charlotte lived with her mother who worked as her accountant. Around the corner in 14 South Street a third house known as 'The Mansion' for over 8s held 93 residents. This house was made available to Sharman by the Vicar of Botolph for a low rent and was also used as a school.

Two young orphans at that time were Walter and Kate Lindsell. Kate was seven and her young brother only two years nine months when their mother died shortly after their father, leaving the family orphaned and destitute. Poor relatives from Hornchurch brought the two to SE 11 where Charlotte Sharman willingly took them in. When Walter reached five years old Sharman felt he was getting too old to stay with his sister in a girl's home and applied for him to be taken into George Müller's home. He was accepted there in September 1873 and after nine years left Müller's homes to be apprenticed as a shoemaker in Street, Somerset. Kate later returned to Hornchurch, married a carpenter and brought up a family of five children.

== Orphanages ==
By 1873 Sharman was caring for 206 children. The mansion was in very poor condition, and the order to pull it down led to Sharman deciding to build her own orphanage. On 22 July 1875 the foundation stone of the 'Orphans nest' was laid by the Duchess of Sutherland. Samuel Morley, M.P., presided. On 6 May 1876, exactly nine years after opening her first home, the north wing of the new building was completed. During the building process Sharman moved some of the residents of the smaller houses to Hampton. When the North Wing was opened, some of these Hampton residents were moved back, but others were sent to Gravesend where she had acquired an old building called 'the castle'. The last wing of the new building was completed in 1884. The building still exists and currently (2010) houses the administrative offices of the Imperial War Museum.

The following year saw her buy a freehold house called 'The Cedars' in Gravesend. She opened it for 40 children, and a further 24 children were located in a house in Tunbridge Wells offered to her by a benefactor rent free. In 1896 she went on to buy a house named 'The Limes', in Mount Pleasant, Hastings. At this time there were 264 children under her charge, of which 200 were in West Square.

At her Jubilee year 1912, 348 girls were in care. A thanksgiving service was held in her honour at Westminster Chapel led by Dr Campbell Morgan. King George V and Randall Thomas Davidson, the then-Archbishop of Canterbury, both sent their congratulations on her achievements.

== Running principles ==
Girls were received at any age, but if they were over 12 years of age a satisfactory reference was required as to character. Regular workhouse cases were not admitted.

Like her mentor George Müller, Charlotte Sharman was dependent on donations for the support of her orphans, or as she liked to call them 'her little people'. She worked with a very strong principle that she would never go into debt whatever the circumstances. People gave her all sorts of gifts, not just money. She established a charity with eight trustees and produced an annual report which became known as her 'small little blue books'. The orphanage was described as "Protestant interdenominational", and the girls went to chapel on Sunday mornings and church in the afternoon.

Sharman established a reputation for very high standards of health. For many years the death rate in the homes was less than the rate in the healthiest towns, being under 1% and in some years nil.

== Tribute from friends ==
John C Carlile, a close friend, paid Sharman the tribute of being a woman of faith, an apostle of practical religion, kind, intelligent, sharp witted and humorous. He wrote, "When she prayed the heavens opened." Among her other friends were the famous evangelical preacher Charles Haddon Spurgeon and the social reformer Anthony Ashley-Cooper, 7th Earl of Shaftesbury. At a time when another woman, Elizabeth Fry, was working hard for prison reform, this woman dedicated herself to the plight of young orphans and rescued hundreds from the cruel streets.
