= Queen and Country (artwork) =

2007 art piece by Steve McQueen

Queen and Country is a 2007 artwork by British artist Steve McQueen. The work is a set of 155 sheets of stamps, each sheet commemorating a soldier who was killed in the Iraq War between 2003 and 2008. The work was a co-commission between the Manchester International Festival and the Imperial War Museum.

== Background ==
McQueen was commissioned, under the official war artists' programme at the Imperial War Museum, to produce a work of art about the British Armed Forces in the Iraq war. In 2006 he travelled to Basra where he spent six days embedded with British troops. Initially he planned to produce a film about the troops he witnessed serving in Iraq but was frustrated by the restrictions on movement placed on him. He approached the US armed forces to work with them but that fell through.

Later at his home in Amsterdam, McQueen was posting his tax return when he noticed the stamp on the envelope had a portrait of Vincent van Gogh. The idea of using a stamp came to him: "a stamp has a beautiful scale, the proportions are right, the image, it is recognisable, and then it goes out into the world, who knows where. Perfect. Wonderful" McQueen said.

When McQueen suggested it to the Ministry of Defence they were lukewarm about the idea, suggesting that McQueen do a landscape instead. The MOD would not supply photos of the deceased, so McQueen used a researcher to contact the families of those who had lost loved ones in Iraq and request an image of their loved ones. McQueen initially contacted 115 families: 98 agreed and 4 refused.

He created an oak cabinet containing a series of facsimile postage sheets which are mounted on 120 double-sided vertical panels, which can be withdrawn for viewing. Each sheet shows multiple portrait heads, each one dedicated to a deceased soldier, with details of name, regiment, age and date of death printed in the margin. The cabinet is ordered in chronological order from the four Royal Marines and three members of the Royal Regiment of Artillery who died on 21 March 2003, to Sergeant "Baz" Barwood of the RAF, who was killed on 29 February 2008.

== Royal Mail response ==
McQueen's intention was that the stamps would be issued by the Royal Mail for general use; however, despite applying to the Royal Mail, he was turned down. The Royal Mail said that service personnel and their families would find pictures of the dead featuring on stamps "distressing and disrespectful". However, the stamps have received support from families, the general public and members of the armed forces.

McQueen said "An official set of Royal Mail stamps struck me as an intimate but distinguished way of highlighting the sacrifice of individuals in defence of our national ideals. The stamps would focus on individual experience without euphemism. It would form an intimate reflection of national loss that would involve the families of the dead and permeate the everyday – every household and every office."

The work premiered in the Great Hall at Central Library, Manchester in March 2007, between then and July 2010 it toured the UK.

McQueen considers the work incomplete until the stamps are released to the public; to that end, a petition was created to gather support for the issuing of the stamps which had acquired 26,673 signatures by July 2010.
