= Imperial War Museum =

British national military museums organization

Imperial War Museums

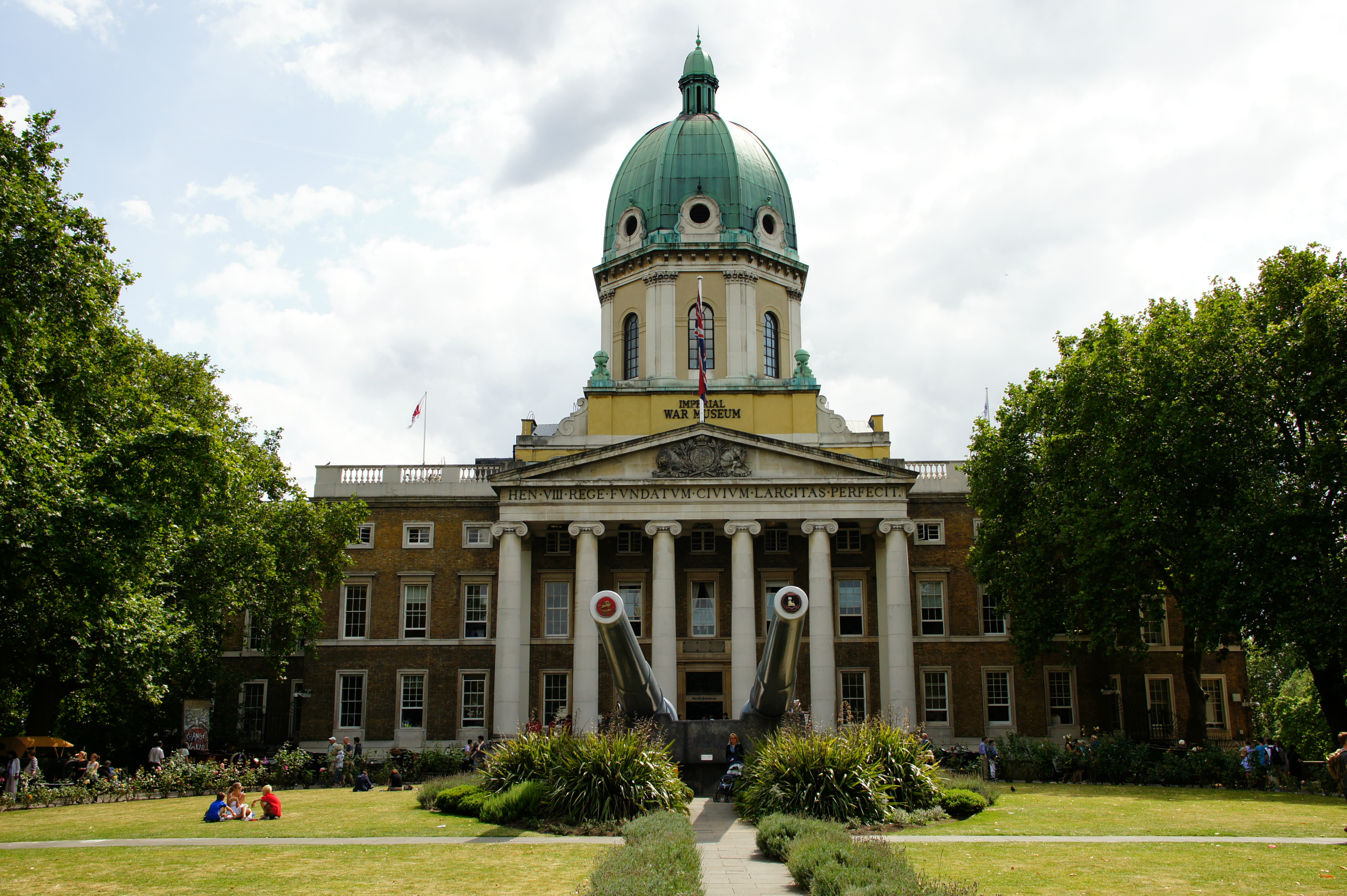
- Imperial War Museum London
- Interactive fullscreen map
- Established: 1917; 109 years ago (branches opened 1976, 1978, 1984 and 2002)
- Location: IWM London: Lambeth Road, London; IWM Duxford: Duxford, Cambridgeshire; HMS Belfast: The Queen's Walk, London; Churchill War Rooms: Clive Steps, King Charles Street, London; IWM North: The Quays, Trafford Wharf Road, Manchester
- Coordinates: 51°29′45″N 0°06′31″W
- Collection size: 33,000,000 archival items, 435,589 museum items
- Visitors: IWM London: 753,652; IWM Duxford: 401,765; HMS Belfast: 204,656; Churchill War Rooms: 538,103; IWM North: 259,349
- Director: Caro Howell
- Presidents: Prince Edward, Duke of Kent; Chairman: Guy Weston
- Public transit access: Lambeth North (IWM London)
- Website: iwm.org.uk

Imperial War Museums
- Churchill War Rooms; HMS Belfast; IWM Duxford; IWM London; IWM North

The Imperial War Museum (IWM), currently branded "Imperial War Museums", is a British national museum. Its headquarters are in London, with five branches in England. Founded as the Imperial War Museum in 1917, it was intended to record the civil and military war effort and sacrifice of the United Kingdom and its Empire during the First World War. The museum's remit has since expanded to include all conflicts in which British or Commonwealth forces have been involved since 1914. As of 2012, the museum aims "to provide for, and to encourage, the study and understanding of the history of modern war and 'wartime experience'."

Originally housed in the Crystal Palace at Sydenham Hill, the museum opened to the public in 1920. In 1924, it moved to space in the Imperial Institute in South Kensington and in 1936 it acquired a permanent home at the former Bethlem Royal Hospital in Southwark, which serves as its headquarters. The outbreak of the Second World War saw the museum expand both its collections and its terms of reference, but in the post-war period it entered a period of decline. In 1976 the museum opened IWM Duxford at Duxford airfield in Cambridgeshire, and in 1978 the Royal Navy cruiser HMS Belfast, which is permanently berthed on the River Thames in central London, became a branch of the museum. In 1984, Churchill War Rooms, an underground wartime command centre in Westminster, were opened to the public. In 2002 IWM North opened in Trafford, Greater Manchester, the fifth branch of the museum and the first in the north of England. From the 1980s onwards, the museum's Southwark building underwent a series of multimillion-pound redevelopments, the latest of which was completed in 2022.

The museum's collections include archives of personal and official documents, photographs, film and video material, and oral history recordings, an extensive library, a large art collection, and examples of military vehicles and aircraft, equipment, and other artefacts.

The museum is funded by government grants, charitable donations, and revenue generation through commercial activity such as retailing, licensing, and publishing. General admission is free to IWM London (although specific exhibitions require the purchase of a ticket) and IWM North, but an admission fee is levied at the other branches. The museum is an exempt charity under the Charities Act 1993 and a non-departmental public body under the Department for Culture, Media and Sport. As of April 2024, the chairman of the trustees is Guy Weston. Since May 2023, Caro Howell has served as the museum's director-general.

== History of the museum ==
=== Establishment: 1917–1921 ===
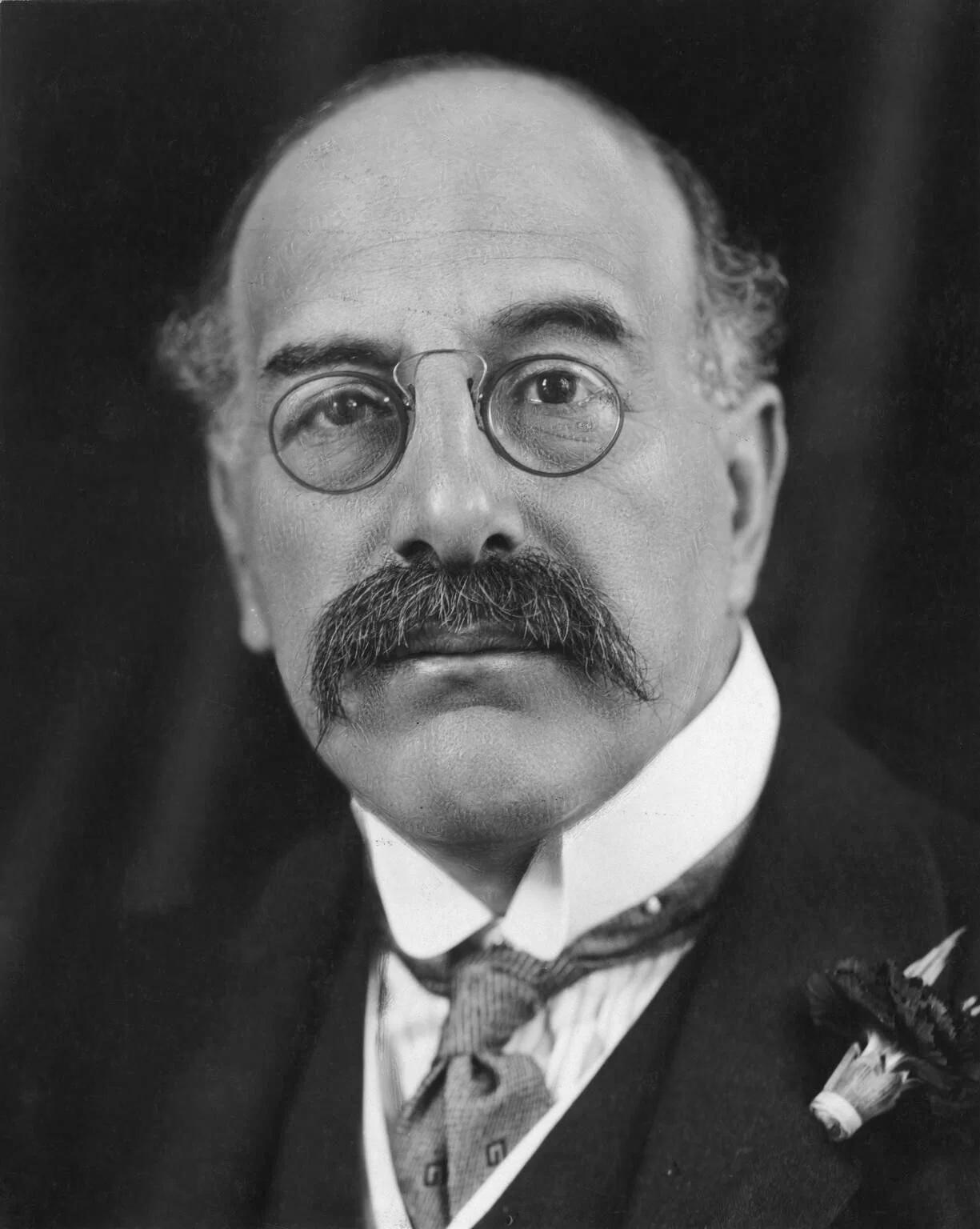
Sir Alfred Mond, photographed between 1910 and 1920

On 27 February 1917 Sir Alfred Mond, a Liberal MP and First Commissioner of Works, wrote to the Prime Minister David Lloyd George to propose the establishment of a National War Museum. This proposal was accepted by the War Cabinet on 5 March 1917 and the decision announced in The Times on 26 March. A committee was established, chaired by Mond, to oversee the collection of material to be exhibited in the new museum.

This National War Museum Committee set about collecting material to illustrate Britain's war effort by dividing into subcommittees examining such subjects as the Army, the Navy, the production of munitions, and women's war work. There was an early appreciation of the need for exhibits to reflect personal experience in order to prevent the collections becoming dead relics. Sir Martin Conway, the museum's first director-general, said that exhibits must "be vitalised by contributions expressive of the action, the experiences, the valour and the endurance of individuals". The museum's first curator and secretary was Charles ffoulkes, who had previously been curator of the Royal Armouries at the Tower of London. In July 1917 Mond made a visit to the Western Front in order to study how best to organise the museum's growing collection. While in France he met French government ministers, along with Field Marshal Sir Douglas Haig, Commander-in-Chief (C-in-C) of the British Expeditionary Force (BEF) on the Western Front, who reportedly took great interest in his work. In December 1917 the name was changed to the Imperial War Museum after a resolution from the India and Dominions Committee of the museum.

Imperial War Museum Act 1920 (Note: Section 6(1).)
- Act of Parliament
- Parliament of the United Kingdom
- Long title: An Act to make provision for the management of the Imperial War Museum and for other purposes connected therewith.
- Citation: 10 & 11 Geo. 5. c. 16
- Territorial extent: United Kingdom

Dates
- Royal assent: 2 July 1920
- Commencement: 2 July 1920 (Note: The Acts of Parliament (Commencement) Act 1793.)
Other legislation
Amended by	National Gallery and Tate Gallery Act 1954; Imperial War Museum Act 1955; Charities Act 1960; Transfer of Functions (Arts and Libraries) Order 1979; Transfer of Functions (Arts, Libraries and National Heritage) Order 1981; Transfer of Functions (Arts, Libraries and National Heritage) Order 1983; Transfer of Functions (Arts, Libraries and National Heritage) Order 1984; Imperial War Museum (Board of Trustees) Order 1986; Transfer of Functions (Arts, Libraries and National Heritage) Order 1986; Imperial War Museum (Board of Trustees) Order 1988; Pakistan Act 1990; Museums and Galleries Act 1992; Charities Act 1993; South Africa Act 1995; Transfer of Functions (Museum and Other Staff) Order 2011; Transfer of Functions (Secretary of State for Foreign, Commonwealth and Development Affairs) Order 2020; Secretaries of State for Energy Security and Net Zero, for Science, Innovation and Technology, for Business and Trade, and for Culture, Media and Sport and the Transfer of Functions (National Security and Investment Act 2021 etc) Order 2023

Status: Amended

Text of statute as originally enacted

Text of the Imperial War Museum Act 1920 as in force today (including any amendments) within the United Kingdom, from legislation.gov.uk.

The museum was opened by King George V at the Crystal Palace on 9 June 1920. During the opening ceremony, Sir Alfred Mond addressed the King on behalf of the committee, saying that "it was hoped to make the museum so complete that every one who took part in the war, however obscurely, would find therein an example or illustration of the sacrifice he or she made" and that the museum "was not a monument of military glory, but a record of toil and sacrifice". Shortly afterwards the Imperial War Museum Act 1920 (10 & 11 Geo. 5. c. 16) was passed and established a board of trustees to oversee the governance of the museum. To reflect the museum's Imperial remit the board included appointees of the governments of India, South Africa, Canada, Australia and New Zealand. While the act was being debated, some parliamentarians felt that the museum would perpetuate an undesirable war spirit and Lieutenant-Commander Joseph Kenworthy MP said that he would "refuse to vote a penny of public money to commemorate such suicidal madness of civilisation as that which was shown in the late War". On the August Bank Holiday 1920, the first public holiday since the museum's opening, 94,179 visitors were received, and by November 1921, 2,290,719 had visited the museum.

=== Relocation 1924–1936 ===
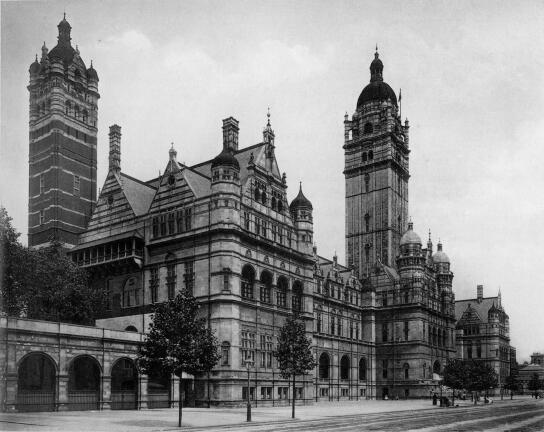
The Imperial Institute, South Kensington, where the museum was located from 1924 to 1936

Bethlem Hospital (Amendment) Act 1931 (Note: Section 4.)
- Act of Parliament
- Parliament of the United Kingdom
- Long title: An Act to confirm certain agreements entered into by the Commissioners of Works with a view to the acquisition for the purposes of the Imperial War Museum of a part of the premises vested by the Bethlem Hospital Act 1926 in the London County Council as an open space and to authorise the retention and adaption of certain of the existing buildings on the said premises and for purposes consequential thereon.
- Citation: 21 & 22 Geo. 5. c. lxiii
- Territorial extent: United Kingdom

Dates
- Royal assent: 31 July 1931
- Commencement: 31 July 1931
Other legislation
Relates to	Imperial War Museum Act 1920; Bethlem Hospital Act 1926

Status: Current legislation

Text of statute as originally enacted

In 1924 the museum moved to the Imperial Institute building (demolished in the 1950s and 1960s to make way for Imperial College) in South Kensington. While this location was more central and in a prestigious area for museums, the accommodation itself proved cramped and inadequate and in 1936 a new permanent location was found south of the River Thames in Southwark. The building, designed by James Lewis was the former Bethlem Royal Hospital which had been vacated following the hospital's relocation to Beckenham in Kent. The site was owned by Lord Rothermere, who had originally intended to demolish the building to provide a public park in what was a severely overcrowded area of London. Eventually the central portion of the hospital building was retained.

The two extensive wings were removed and the resulting space named Geraldine Mary Harmsworth Park, after Lord Rothermere's mother. Sir Martin Conway described the building as "...a fine building, really quite noble building, with a great portico, a distinguishing dome, and two great wings added to it for the accommodation of lunatics no longer required. This particular building can be made to contain our collection admirably, and we shall preserve from destruction quite a fine building which otherwise will disappear". The "distinguishing dome" was added by Sydney Smirke in 1846 and housed the hospital's chapel. The museum was reopened by the Duke of York (later King George VI) in its new accommodation on 7 July 1936.

=== Second World War and after: 1939–1966 ===
With the outbreak of the Second World War in 1939, the museum began to collect material documenting the conflict. In November 1939, during the "Phoney War", the museum appeared in the opening sequence of the GPO Film Unit production The First Days, in which children are seen playing on some of the museum's German artillery pieces captured during the First World War. With the Dunkirk evacuation in May–June 1940, the British Army's shortage of equipment saw eighteen of the museum's artillery pieces return to military service. The museum's trench clubs were used by the Home Guard, while other items such as sights and optical instruments were returned to the Ministry of Supply. The museum refused to return some historic items such as a naval gun from HMS Lance (which had fired Britain's first shot of the First World War) or a gun served by Victoria Cross-winning boy seaman Jack Cornwell. The museum was closed for the duration of the war in September 1940 with the onset of the Blitz. On 31 January 1941 the museum was struck by a Luftwaffe bomb which fell on the naval gallery. A number of ship models were damaged by the blast and a Short Type 184 seaplane, which had flown at the Battle of Jutland, was destroyed. While closed to the public the museum's building was used for a variety of purposes connected to the war effort, such as a repair garage for government motor vehicles, a centre for Air Raid Precautions civil defence lectures and a fire fighting training school.

In October 1945 the museum mounted a temporary exhibition, the first since the end of the war in August, which showcased technologies developed by the Petroleum Warfare Department. These included the submarine fuel pipeline PLUTO, the fog dispersal method FIDO, and flame weapons such as the Churchill Crocodile and Wasp Universal Carrier. Due to bomb damage to the building and exhibits, the museum was obliged to reopen its galleries piecemeal and opened a portion of its galleries in November 1946. A third of the galleries were opened in 1948 and a further wing opened in 1949. In 1953, with Commonwealth forces engaged in Korea and Malaya the museum began its current policy of collecting material from all modern conflicts in which British or Commonwealth forces were involved. Despite this expansion of remit, the early postwar period was a period of decline for the museum. Noble Frankland, the museum's director from 1960 to 1982, described the museum's galleries in 1955 as appearing "dingy and neglected [and in a] dismal state of decay" the museum's "numerous stunning exhibits" notwithstanding. The Imperial War Museum Act 1955 (c. 14), enabled the museum to make loans to public exhibts.

=== Redevelopment and expansion: 1966–2012 ===
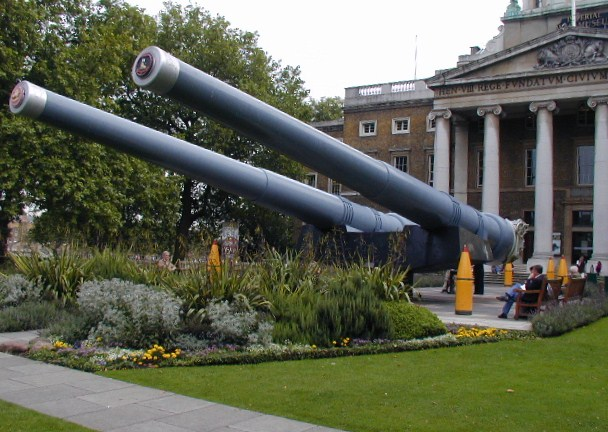
15-inch guns outside the museum; the nearer gun from HMS Ramillies, the other from HMS Resolution

In 1966 the museum's Southwark building was extended to provide collections storage and other facilities, the first major expansion since the museum had moved to the site. The development also included a purpose-built cinema. In 1967 the museum acquired a pair of 15-inch naval guns. One had been mounted on the Royal Navy's HMS Ramillies and the other on both HMS Resolution and HMS Roberts. Both had been fired in action during the Second World War. They went on permanent display outside the museum in May 1968. The acquisition of these guns, representative of the dreadnought era of British battleships, led the museum to seek to acquire a 6-inch triple turret that would be representative of a number of classes of British cruisers. This would eventually lead to the preservation of the Royal Navy light cruiser HMS Belfast, which became a branch of the museum in 1978. Later in 1968 on 13 October the museum was attacked by an arsonist, Timothy John Daly, who claimed he was acting in protest against the exhibition of militarism to children. He caused damage valued at approximately £200,000, not counting the loss of irreplaceable books and documents. On his conviction in 1969 he was sentenced to four years in prison.

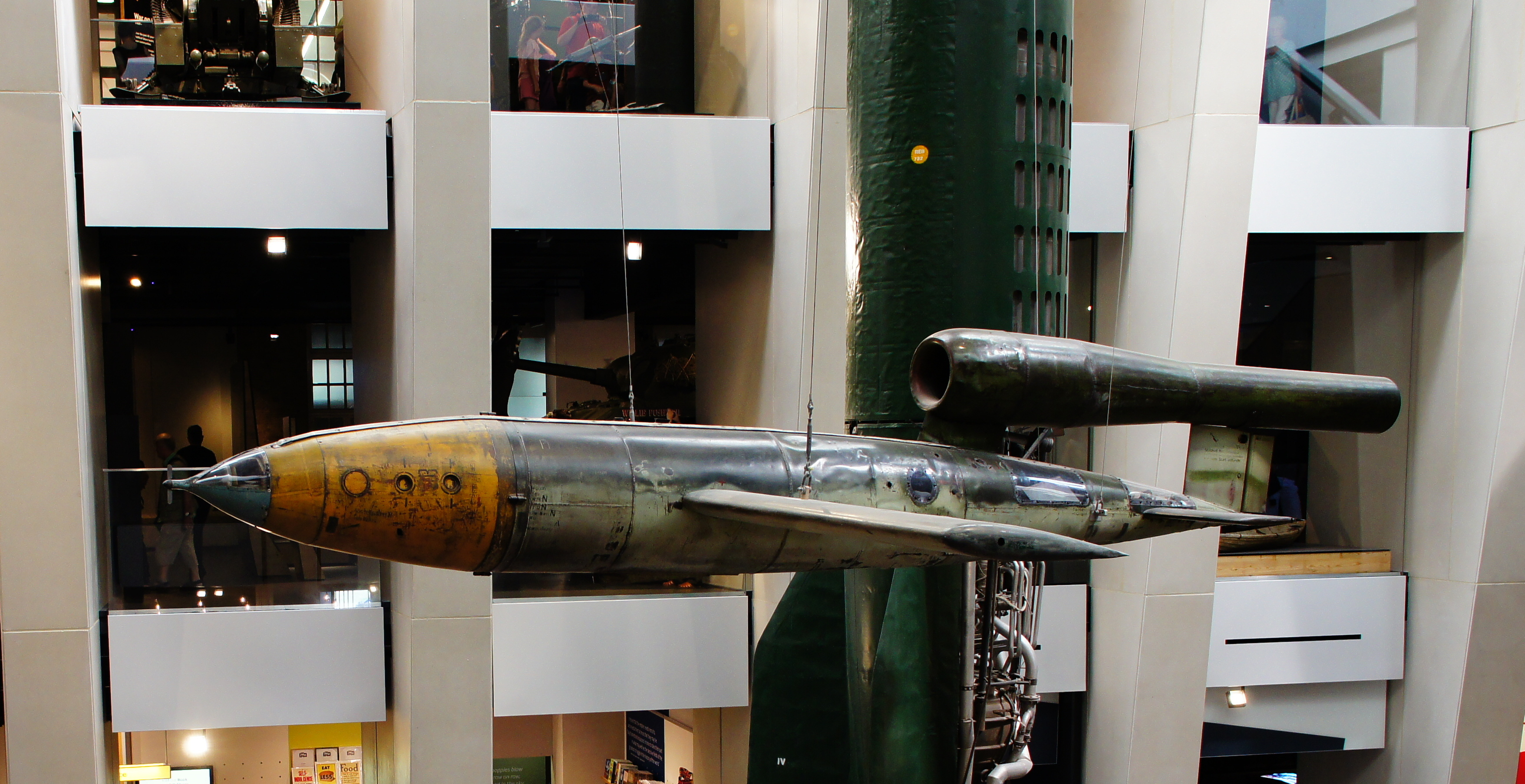
V-1 flying bomb on display

In 1969 RAF Duxford, a Royal Air Force fighter airfield in Cambridgeshire was declared surplus to requirements by the Ministry of Defence. Needing further space, the museum duly requested permission to use part of the site as temporary storage. The entire site was later transferred to the museum in February 1976 and Duxford, now referred to as Imperial War Museum Duxford became the museum's first branch. Also during the 1970s the government raised the possibility of the museum taking over the historic Cabinet War Rooms in Whitehall. The museum was reluctant due to its new commitments related to Duxford and HMS Belfast, but agreed in 1982.

By 1983 the museum was again looking to redevelop the Southwark site and approached engineering firm Arup to plan a phased programme of works that would expand the building's exhibition space, provide appropriate environmental controls to protect collections, and improve facilities for visitors. The following year, in April 1984, the Cabinet War Rooms were opened to the public as a branch of the museum.

The first phase of the works to the Southwark building started in 1986 and were completed in 1989, during which time the museum was closed to the public. The work included the conversion of what was previously the hospital's courtyard into a centrepiece Large Exhibits Gallery. This gallery featured a strengthened ground floor (to support the weight of very heavy exhibits), a first floor mezzanine and second storey viewing balcony. Into this space were placed tanks, artillery pieces, vehicles, ordnance and aircraft from the First World War to the Falklands War. For some years the museum was marketed as "The new Imperial War Museum". This atrium, with its concentration of military hardware, has been described as "the biggest boys' bedroom in London". This first phase cost £16.7 million (of which £12 million was provided by the government) and the museum was reopened by The Queen on 29 June 1989. In 1990, the museum was awarded National Heritage Museum of the Year.

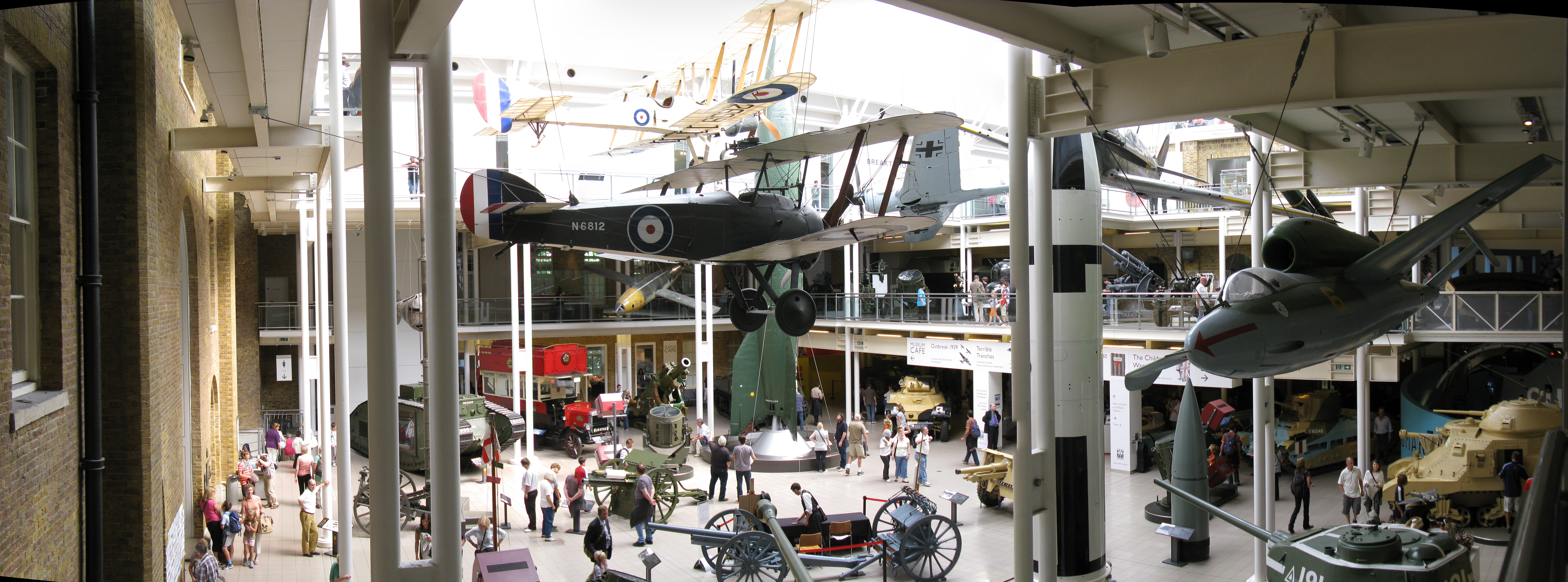
The atrium in August 2009. Ground floor exhibits include: "Devil" a Mark V tank; "Ole Bill" an LGOC B-type bus, V-2 and Polaris missiles, 800 mm shell from Schwerer Gustav, and (sand-coloured, extreme right) a Grant tank used by Bernard Montgomery. Suspended aircraft include a Sopwith Camel, Heinkel He 162 and (partially obscured) Supermarine Spitfire number R/6915, which flew in the Battle of Britain and shot down three aircraft.

In September 1992 the museum was the target of a Provisional Irish Republican Army attack against London tourist attractions. Two incendiary devices were found in a basement gallery, but were extinguished by staff before the arrival of the fire brigade, and caused only minor damage.

The second stage of the redevelopment of the Southwark building, during which the museum remained open to the public, was completed in 1994. During the 1990s, while these works were going on, the museum was also seeking to open a branch in the north of England. 71 sites were offered for consideration by 36 local councils and in January 1999 the then Culture Secretary Chris Smith formally launched a project to construct a new branch of the museum, Imperial War Museum North, in Trafford, Greater Manchester. 1999 also saw the Museum's first Poetry Residency, launching the long-lasting "Search and Create" initiative in which war-themed poems were installed among the artefacts to stimulate public and schools engagement.

The following year, 2000, the final phase of the Southwark redevelopment was completed. The development included the installation of the museum's Holocaust Exhibition which was opened by the Queen on 6 June 2000. This was the first permanent exhibition dedicated to the Holocaust in a UK museum; its development had taken five years at a cost of £5 million. Two years later, in July 2002, Imperial War Museum North was opened.

Between 2004 and 2010 the museum was a partner in a national learning project entitled "Their Past Your Future" (TPYF), part of the Big Lottery Fund's Veterans Reunited programme to commemorate the 60th anniversary of the end of the Second World War. A partnership between the IWM, the Museums, Libraries and Archives Council, and Scottish, Northern Irish and Welsh museum authorities, phase one included a touring exhibition seen by more than two million people, overseas educational visits and further activities run by local authorities. A second phase took a wider 20th-century historical remit; it comprised a learning programme using overseas visits and social media, and a professional development scheme for educators. A digital archive of the project, online exhibitions and learning resources were also produced.

In October 2011 the museum rebranded itself as Imperial War Museums, the initials IWM forming the basis of a new corporate logo.

In September 2011 the museum secured funding from NESTA, the Arts and Humanities Research Council and Arts Council England to develop "social interpretation" systems to allow visitors to comment on, collect, and share museum objects via social media. These systems were incorporated in "A Family in Wartime", an exhibition at IWM London depicting British family life during the Second World War, which opened in April 2012.

=== First World War centenary: 2014 ===
In August 2009 the museum announced the creation of the Imperial War Museum Foundation. Chaired by Jonathan Harmsworth the foundation was charged with raising funds to support the redevelopment of Imperial War Museum London's permanent galleries. In December 2010 plans were announced to redevelop IWM London's First World War gallery in time for the conflict's centenary in 2014, and Prince William, Duke of Cambridge became the foundation's patron. In a speech at IWM London on 11 October 2012, Prime Minister David Cameron announced an additional £5 million of government funding to support the museum's redevelopment, as part of funding arrangements to facilitate national centenary commemorations. The £40 million redevelopment, designed by Foster and Partners, provides new gallery spaces dedicated to the history of the First World War, a new central hall, easier navigation and improved visitor facilities, access and circulation. In preparation for building work, a number of galleries were closed during September 2012, and by December 2012 over sixty large objects had been removed from the IWM London atrium for conservation at Duxford. To allow building work to go ahead, IWM London closed to the public on 2 January 2013. The museum partially reopened on 29 July 2013.

IWM London was formally reopened on 17 July 2014 by Prince William, Duke of Cambridge.

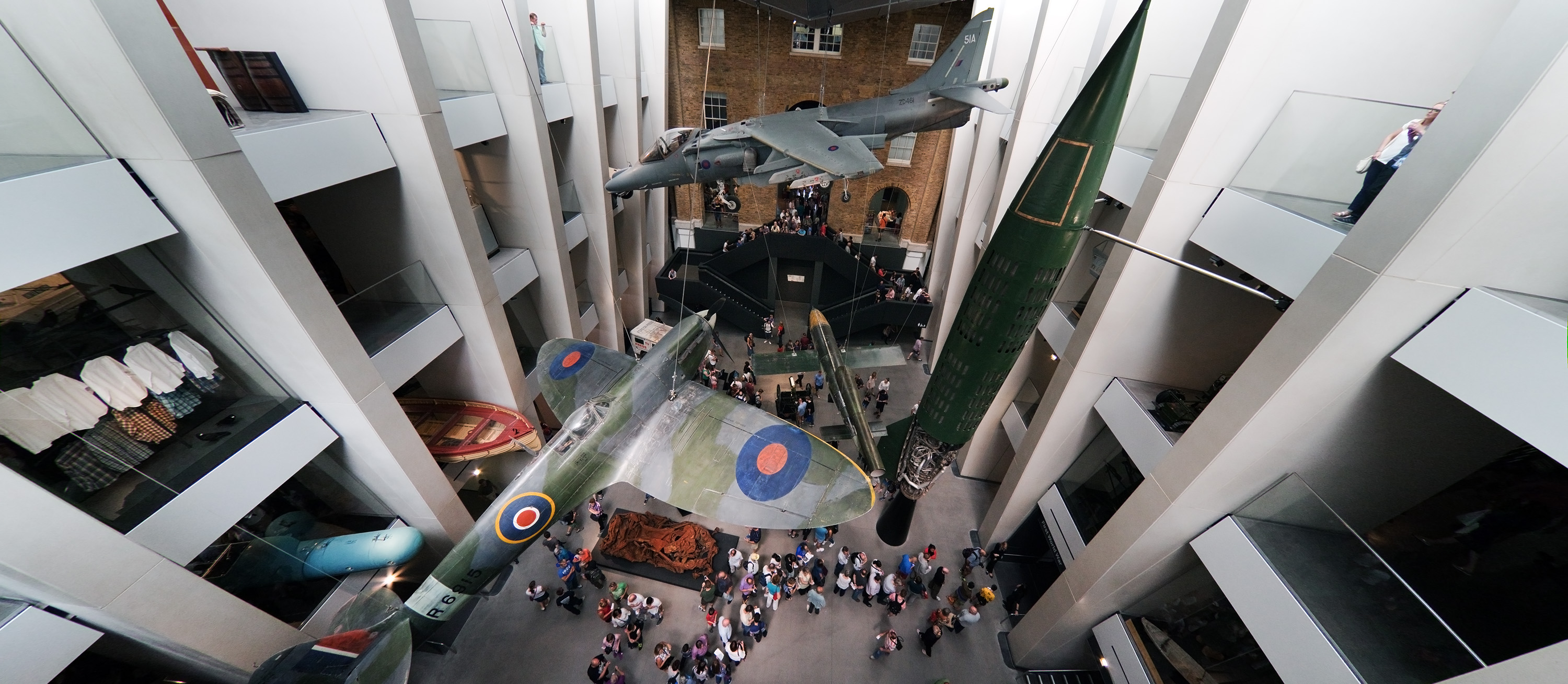
The new atrium, July 2014. The exhibits include a Supermarine Spitfire, a V-1 flying bomb, a V-2 rocket, a Harrier jump jet, and Jeremy Deller's Baghdad, 5 March 2007, the wreckage of a car destroyed by a bomb during the Iraq War.

=== 2020 onward ===
All of the sites of the Imperial War Museum were closed to the public from 17 March to 31 July 2020 inclusive, owing to the COVID-19 pandemic. A further shutdown, for the same reasons, was in place from 16 December 2020 to 18 May 2021 inclusive.

In 2025, the Museum announced the closure of its Lord Ashcroft Gallery. Its Extraordinary Heroes exhibition included around 200 Victoria Crosses, which were placed in storage. The Museum stated it planned instead to expand coverage of "post-second world war conflict, including the cold war, Falklands war and the wars in Afghanistan and Iraq". In 2026, the museum followed by announcing a rebranding project that would de-emphasise the Second World War and emphasise later conflicts instead. In November 2026, the IWM received £10 million in government funding for a new conservation centre at Duxford, scheduled to open in 2029.

== Branches ==
From the 1970s onwards the Imperial War Museum began to expand onto other sites. The first branch, Imperial War Museum Duxford opened to the public on a regular basis in June 1976. HMS Belfast became a branch of the museum in 1978. The Churchill War Rooms opened in 1984, and Imperial War Museum North in 2002.

=== Imperial War Museum London ===
==== Architecture and layout ====
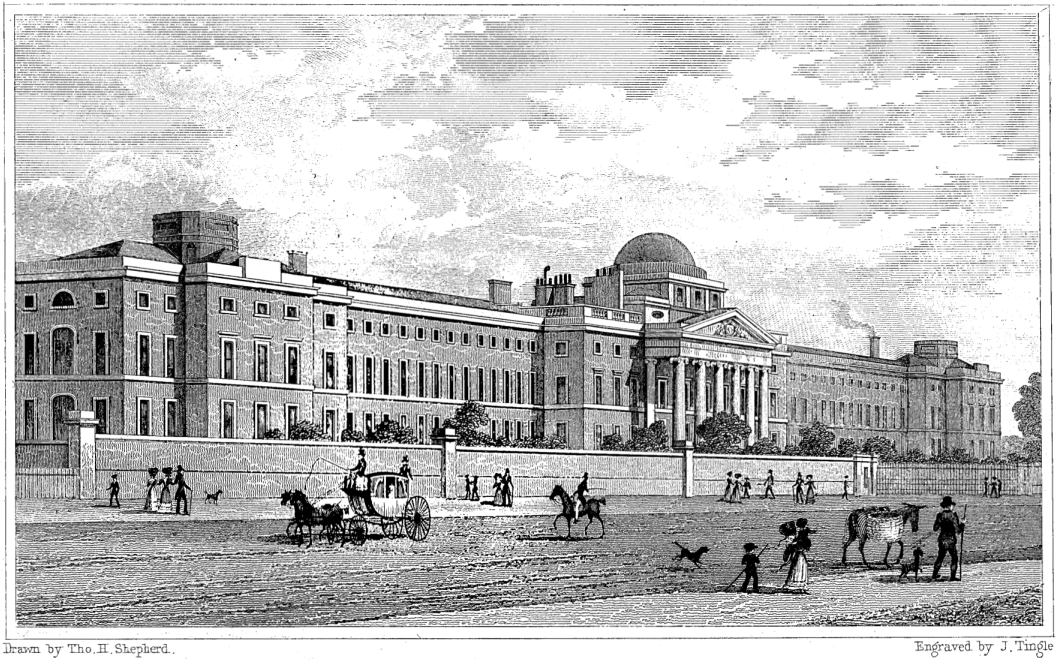
A view of Bethlem Royal Hospital in 1828

The museum has occupied the former Bethlem Royal Hospital on Lambeth Road since 1936. The hospital building was designed by the hospital surveyor, James Lewis, from plans submitted by John Gandy and other architects, and construction completed in October 1814. The hospital consisted of a range of buildings 580 feet long with a basement and three storeys, parallel to Lambeth Road, with a central entrance under a portico.

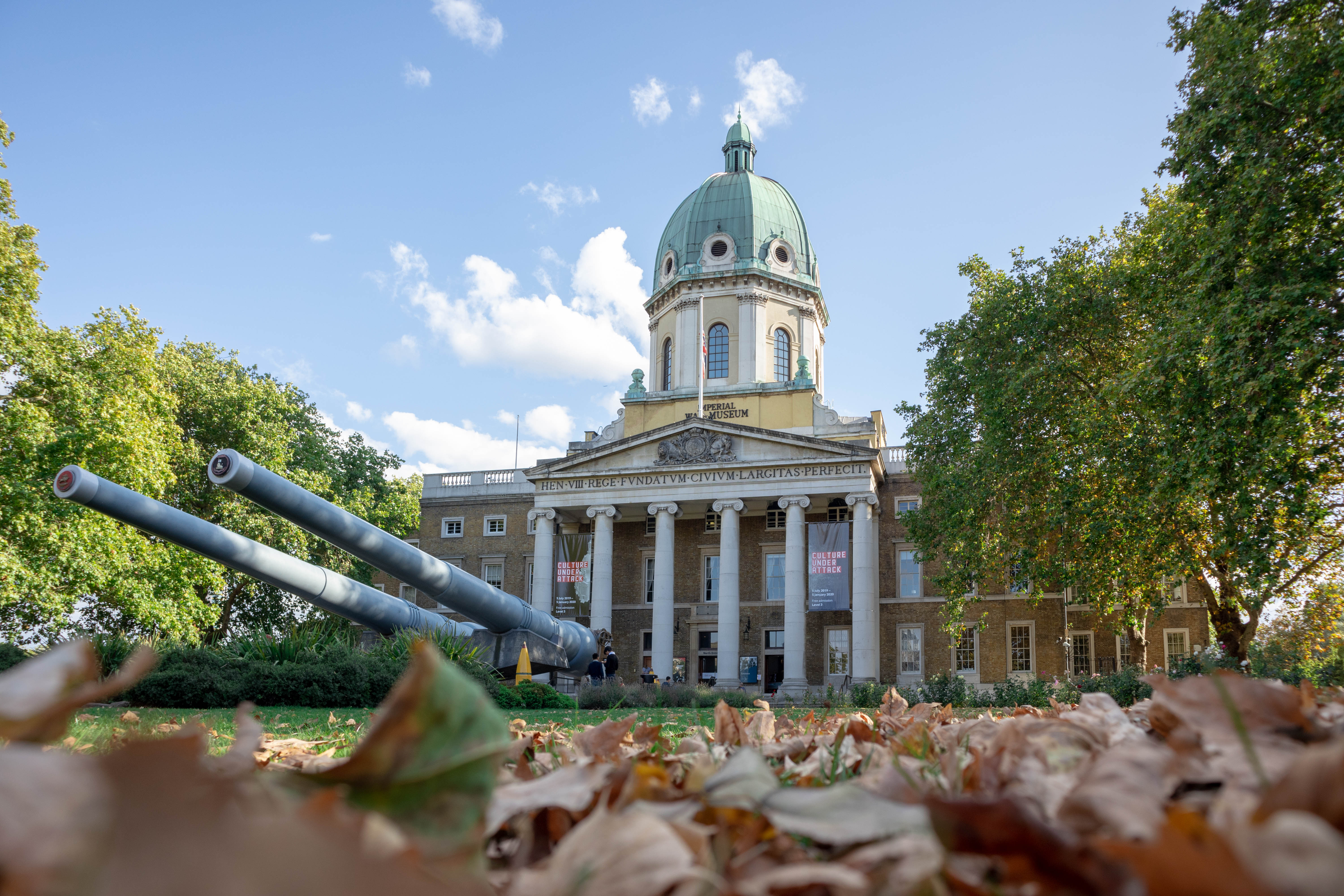
15-inch guns and copper dome

The building was substantially altered in 1835 by architect Sydney Smirke. In order to provide more space, he added blocks at either end of the frontage, and galleried wings on either side of the central portion. He also added a small single-storey lodge, still in existence, at the Lambeth Road gate. Later, between 1844 and 1846, the central cupola was replaced with a copper-clad dome in order to expand the chapel beneath. The building also featured a theatre in a building to the rear of the site.

The building remained substantially unchanged until vacated by the hospital in 1930. After the freehold was purchased by Lord Rothermere, the wings were demolished to leave the original central portion (with the dome now appearing disproportionately tall) and Smirke's later wings. When the museum moved into the building in 1936 the ground floor of the central portion was occupied by the principal art gallery, with the east wing housing the Naval gallery and the west wing the Army gallery. The Air Force gallery was housed in the former theatre. The first floor comprised further art galleries (including rooms dedicated to Sir William Orpen and Sir John Lavery), a gallery on women's war work, and exhibits relating to transport and signals. The first floor also housed the museum's photograph collection. The second floor housed the museum's library in its west wing, and in the east wing the map collection and stored pictures and drawings. This division of exhibits by service, and by civil or military activity, persisted until a wide-ranging redisplay of the galleries from the 1960s onwards. In September 1972 the building received Grade II listed building status.

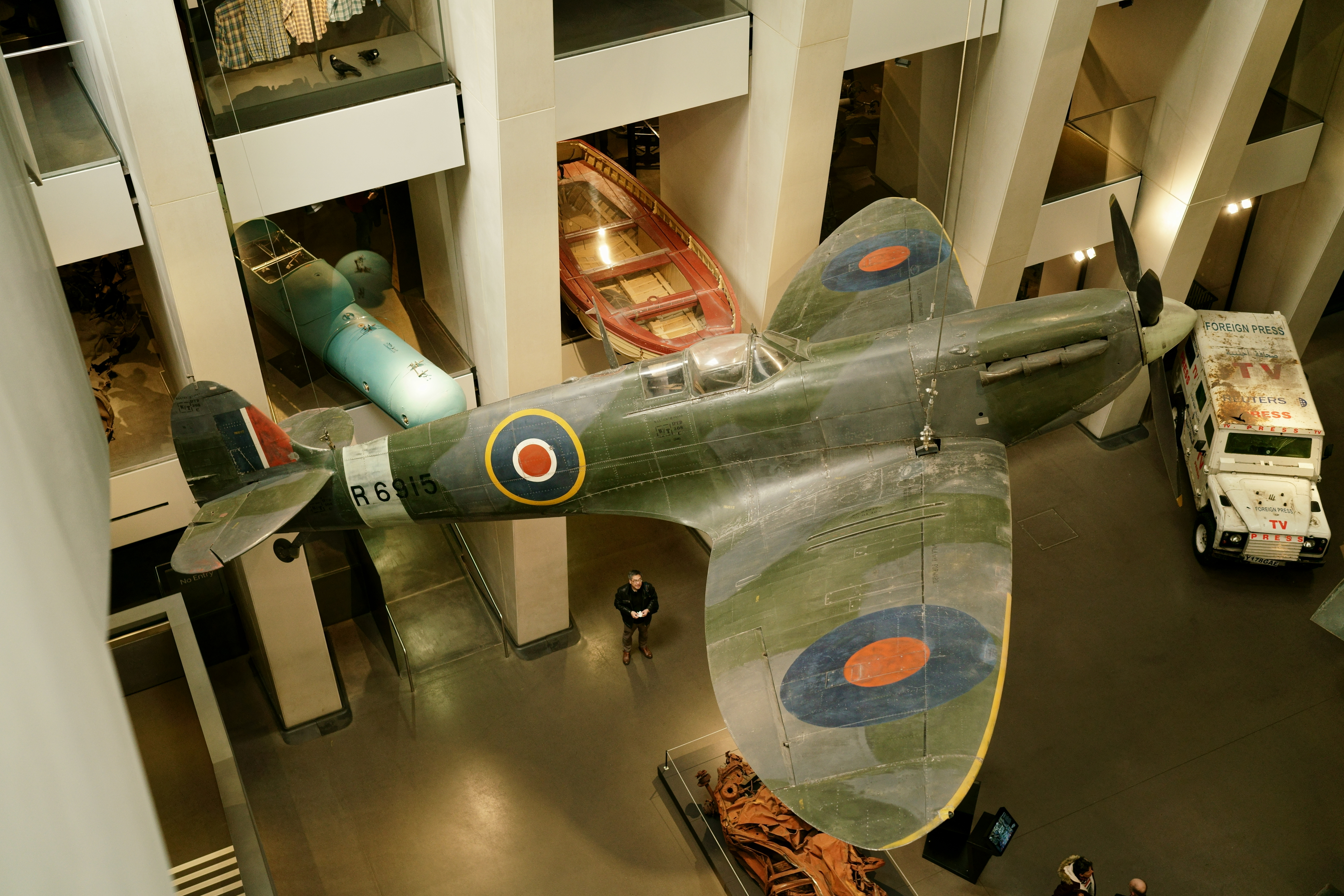
Top view of the Supermarine Spitfire

The original hospital building is now largely occupied by corporate offices. The 1966 extension houses the library, art store, and document archives while the 1980s redevelopments created exhibition space over five floors. The first stage created 8,000 m^{2} of gallery space of which 4,600 m^{2} was new, and the second provided a further 1,600 m^{2}. The final phase, the Southwest Infill, was partly funded by a £12.6 million grant from the Heritage Lottery Fund and provided 5,860m^{2} of gallery space and educational facilities over six floors. Before the 2013–14 redevelopment, the basement was occupied by permanent galleries on the First and Second World Wars, and of conflicts after 1945. The ground floor comprised the atrium, cinema, temporary exhibition spaces, and visitor facilities. The first floor included the atrium mezzanine, education facilities, and a permanent gallery, Secret War, exploring special forces, espionage and covert operations. The second floor included the atrium viewing balcony, two art galleries, a temporary exhibition area and the permanent Crimes against Humanity exhibition. The third floor housed the permanent Holocaust Exhibition, and the fourth floor, a vaulted roof space, accommodated the Lord Ashcroft Gallery. Opened in November 2010 the gallery exhibits the museum's Victoria Cross (VC) and George Cross collection, alongside the private VC collection amassed by Michael Ashcroft, 241 medals in total. The Lord Ashcroft Collection was on loan for ten years, was extended for a further five years because of COVID, and the termination of the loan was first confirmed in July 2024, resulting in the closure on 1 June 2025.

In August 2019, the museum announced plans to spend over £30 million on a new set of galleries over two floors at its London site covering the Holocaust and its importance in World War II. The galleries opened in October 2021 to replace the existing permanent exhibition.

==== All Saints Annexe ====
In 1989 the museum acquired the All Saints Annexe, a former hospital building in Austral Street off West Square. The 1867 building, which backs onto Geraldine Mary Harmsworth Park, was originally an orphanage opened by local philanthropist Charlotte Sharman, then later used as a hospital. It housed the museum's photographic, film and sound archives, and offices.

=== Imperial War Museum Duxford ===
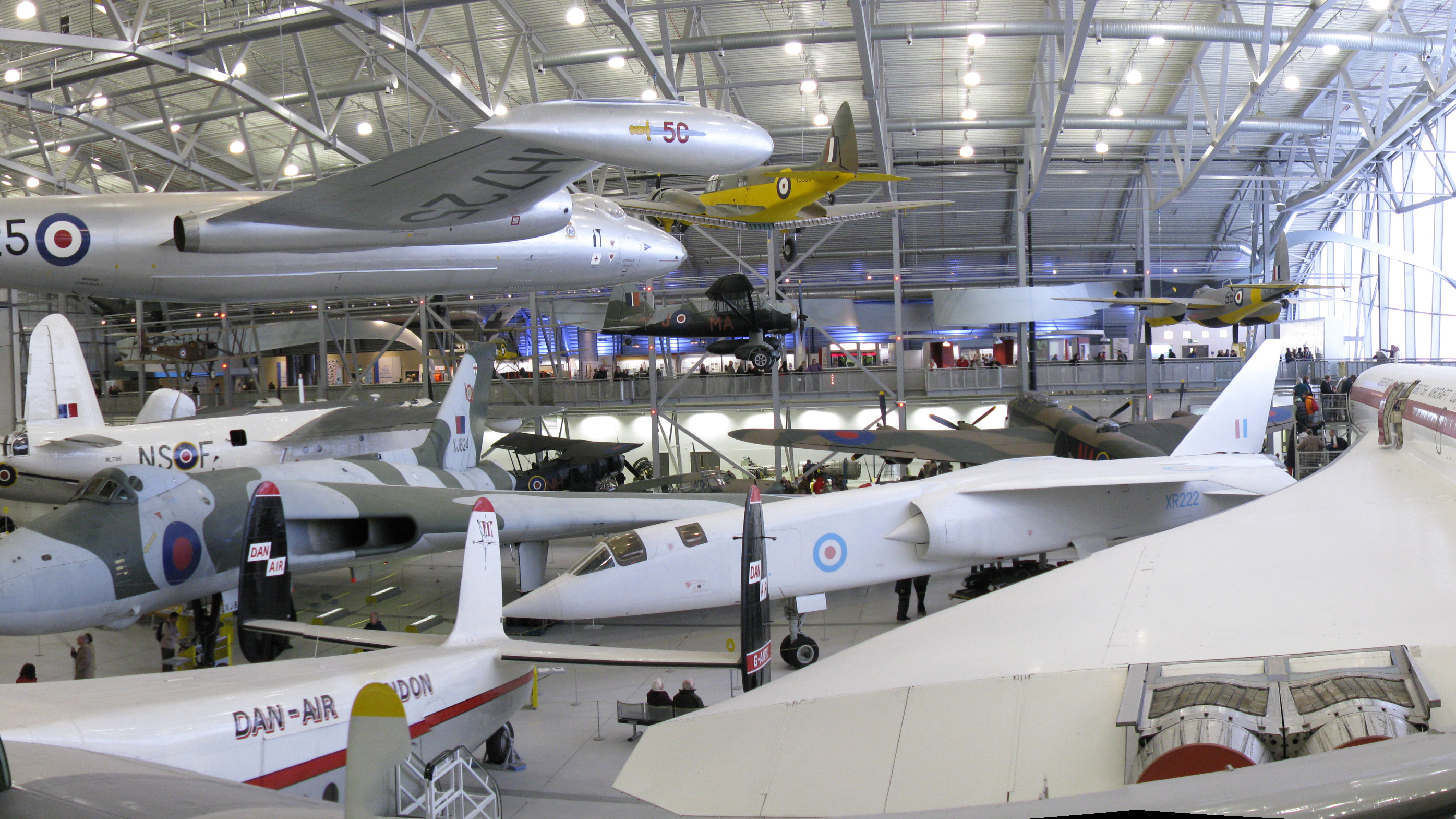
AirSpace at IWM Duxford

Imperial War Museum Duxford, near the village of Duxford in Cambridgeshire, is Britain's largest aviation museum. Duxford houses the museum's large exhibits, including nearly 200 aircraft, military vehicles, artillery and minor naval vessels in seven main exhibitions buildings. The site also provides storage space for the museum's collections of film, photographs, documents, books and artefacts. The site accommodates a number of British Army regimental museums, including those of the Parachute Regiment and the Royal Anglian Regiment.

Based on the historic Duxford Aerodrome, the site was originally operated by the Royal Air Force (RAF) during the First World War. During the Second World War Duxford played a prominent role during the Battle of Britain and was later used by United States Army Air Forces fighter units in support of the daylight bombing of Germany. Duxford remained an active RAF airfield until 1961. Many of Duxford's original buildings, such as hangars used during the Battle of Britain, are still in use. A number of these buildings are of architectural or historic significance and over thirty have listed building status. The site also features a number of purpose-built exhibition buildings, such as the Stirling Prize-winning American Air Museum, designed by Sir Norman Foster. The site remains an active airfield and is used by a number of civilian flying companies, and hosts regular air shows. The site is operated in partnership with Cambridgeshire County Council and the Duxford Aviation Society, a charity formed in 1975 to preserve civil aircraft and promote appreciation of British civil aviation history.

=== HMS Belfast (1938) ===
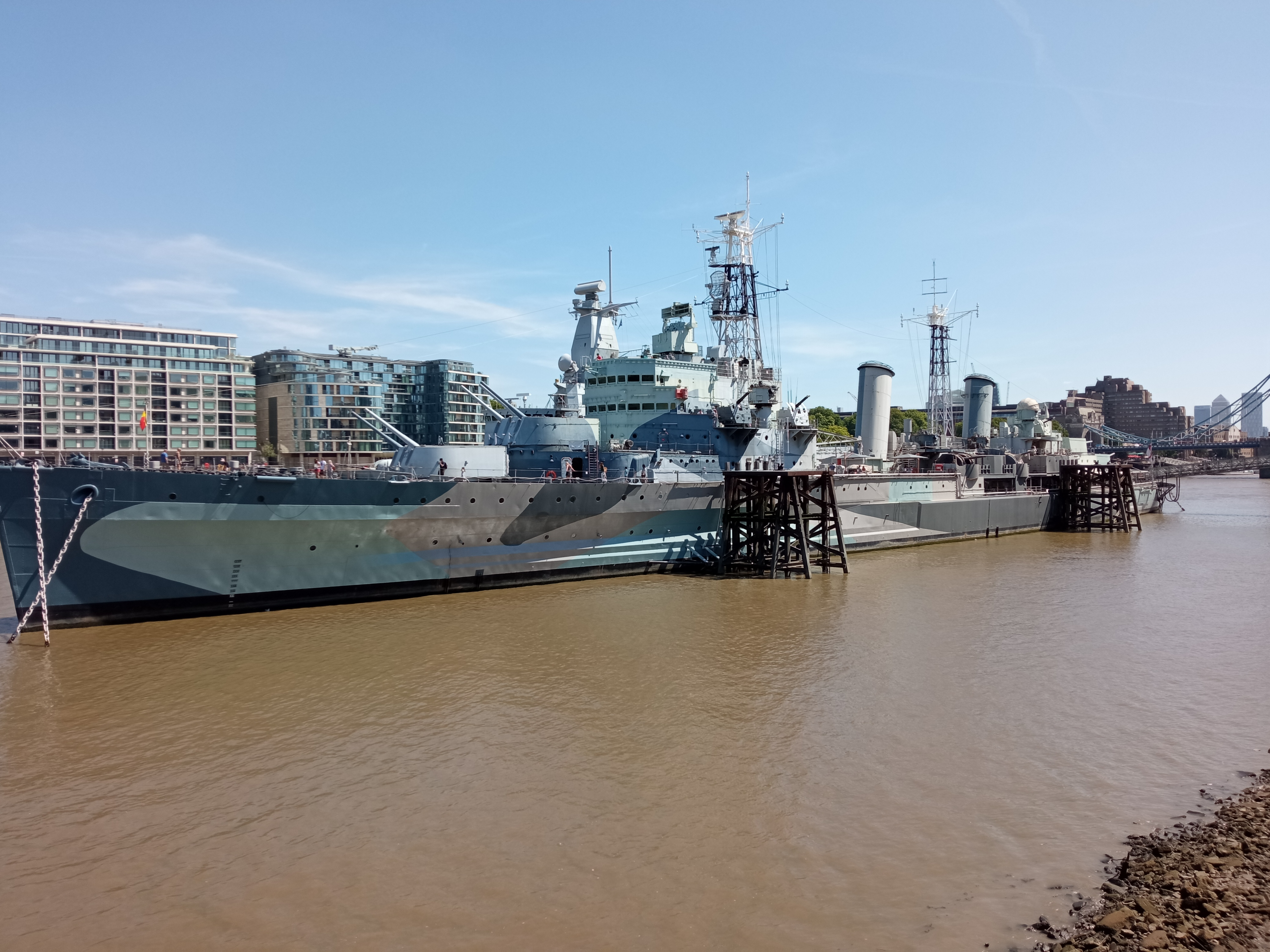
HMS Belfast at her berth in the Pool of London

HMS Belfast, a Town class cruiser, was launched in 1938 and served throughout the Second World War, participating in the December 1943 Battle of North Cape and firing some of the first shots of Operation Overlord, the Allied invasion of Normandy in June 1944. She saw further combat in the Korean War. Expected to be disposed of as scrap after she was decommissioned in 1963, in 1967 efforts were initiated to preserve Belfast as a museum ship. A joint committee of the Imperial War Museum, the National Maritime Museum and the Ministry of Defence was established, and reported in June 1968 that preservation was practical. In 1971 the government decided against preservation, prompting the formation of the private HMS Belfast Trust to campaign for her to be saved for the nation. The Trust was successful in its efforts, and the government transferred the ship to the Trust in July 1971. Brought to London, she was moored on the River Thames near Tower Bridge in the Pool of London. Opened to the public in October 1971 Belfast became a branch of the Imperial War Museum on 1 March 1978, being acknowledged by the then Secretary of State for Education and Science, Shirley Williams, as "a unique demonstration of an important phase of our history and technology". In service for 24 years HMS Belfast was in Frankland's opinion, capable of representing "a whole generation of [historical evidence]".

In 2017, the name of the exhibit was changed to "HMS Belfast 1938" to reflect that one of the Royal Navy's new Type 26 frigates had been given the name HMS Belfast.

=== Churchill War Rooms ===
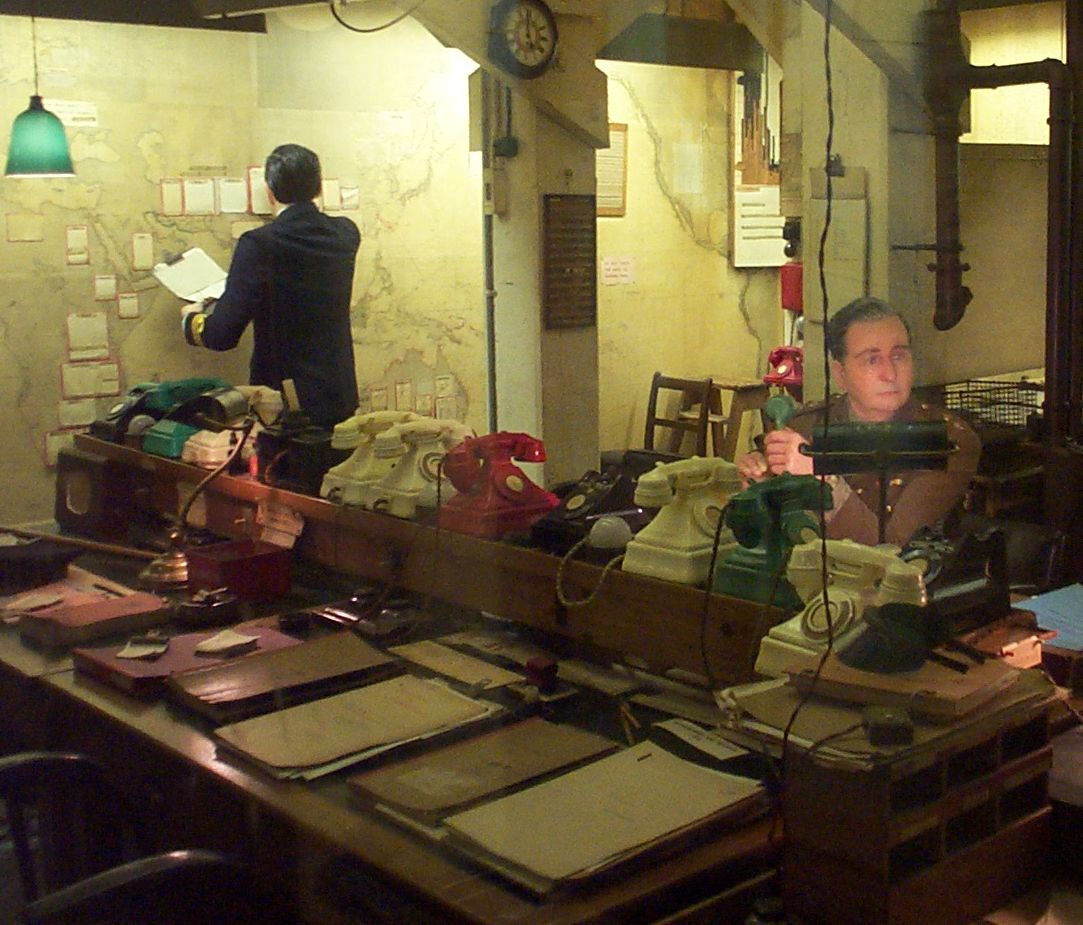
The Map Room of the Cabinet War Rooms

The Cabinet War Rooms is an underground complex that served as a British government command centre throughout the Second World War. Located beneath the Treasury building in the Whitehall area of Westminster, the facilities became operational in 1939 and were in constant use until their abandonment in August 1945 after the surrender of Japan. Their historical value was recognised early on, and the public were able to visit by appointment. However, the practicalities of allowing public access to a site beneath a working government office meant that only 4,500 of 30–40,000 annual applicants to visit the War Rooms could be admitted. The museum agreed to take over the administration of the site in 1982, a development keenly supported by the then Prime Minister Margaret Thatcher, an admirer of Britain's wartime Prime Minister Winston Churchill. Thatcher opened the War Rooms in April 1984. In 2003 a further suite of rooms, used as accommodation by Churchill, his wife and close associates, were added to the museum. The restoration of these rooms, which since the war had been stripped out and used for storage, cost £7.5 million. In 2005 the War Rooms were rebranded as the Churchill Museum and Cabinet War Rooms, with 850 m^{2} of the site redeveloped as a biographical museum exploring Churchill's life. The development of the Churchill Museum cost a further £6 million. The centrepiece is a 15 m interactive table which enables visitors to access digitised material, particularly from the Churchill Archives Centre, via an "electronic filing cabinet". The museum was renamed the Churchill War Rooms in 2010.

=== Imperial War Museum North ===
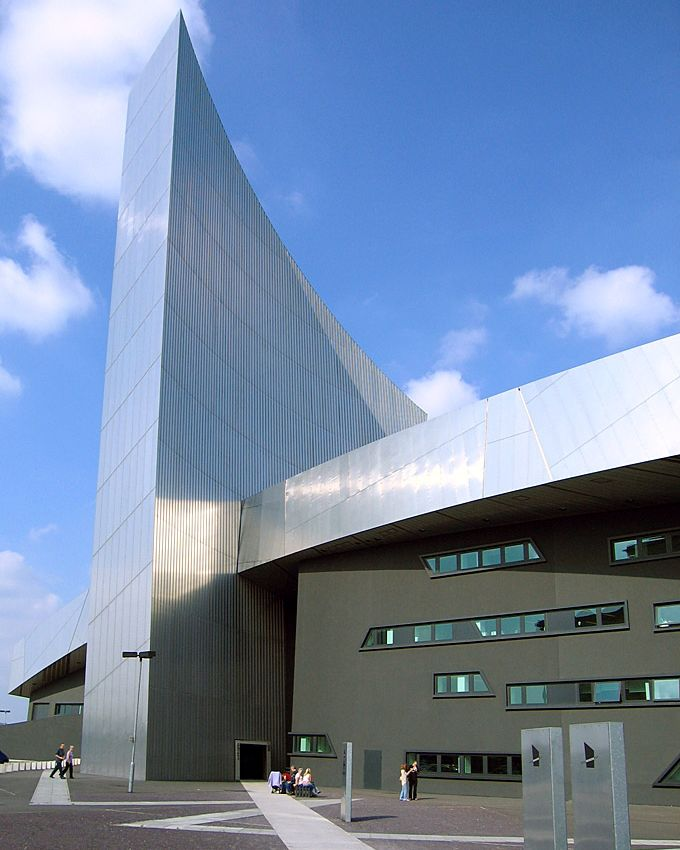
Entrance of Imperial War Museum North in Manchester

The Imperial War Museum North was opened in Trafford, Greater Manchester, in 2002. It was the first branch of the museum outside southeast England, and the first to be purpose-built as a museum. Designed by architect Daniel Libeskind, with Manchester-based architects Leach Rhodes Walker providing implementation services, The Imperial War Museum North was Libeskind's first building in Britain. Libeskind's building, overlooking the Manchester Ship Canal at Salford Quays, was based on the concept of a globe shattered by conflict into shards and reassembled. These shards, representing earth, air and water, give the building its shape. Originally budgeted at £40 million, the museum was completed for £28.5 million after anticipated funding was not forthcoming. The museum was funded by local, national and European development agencies, by private donations and by Peel Holdings, a local transport and property company which contributed £12.5 million.

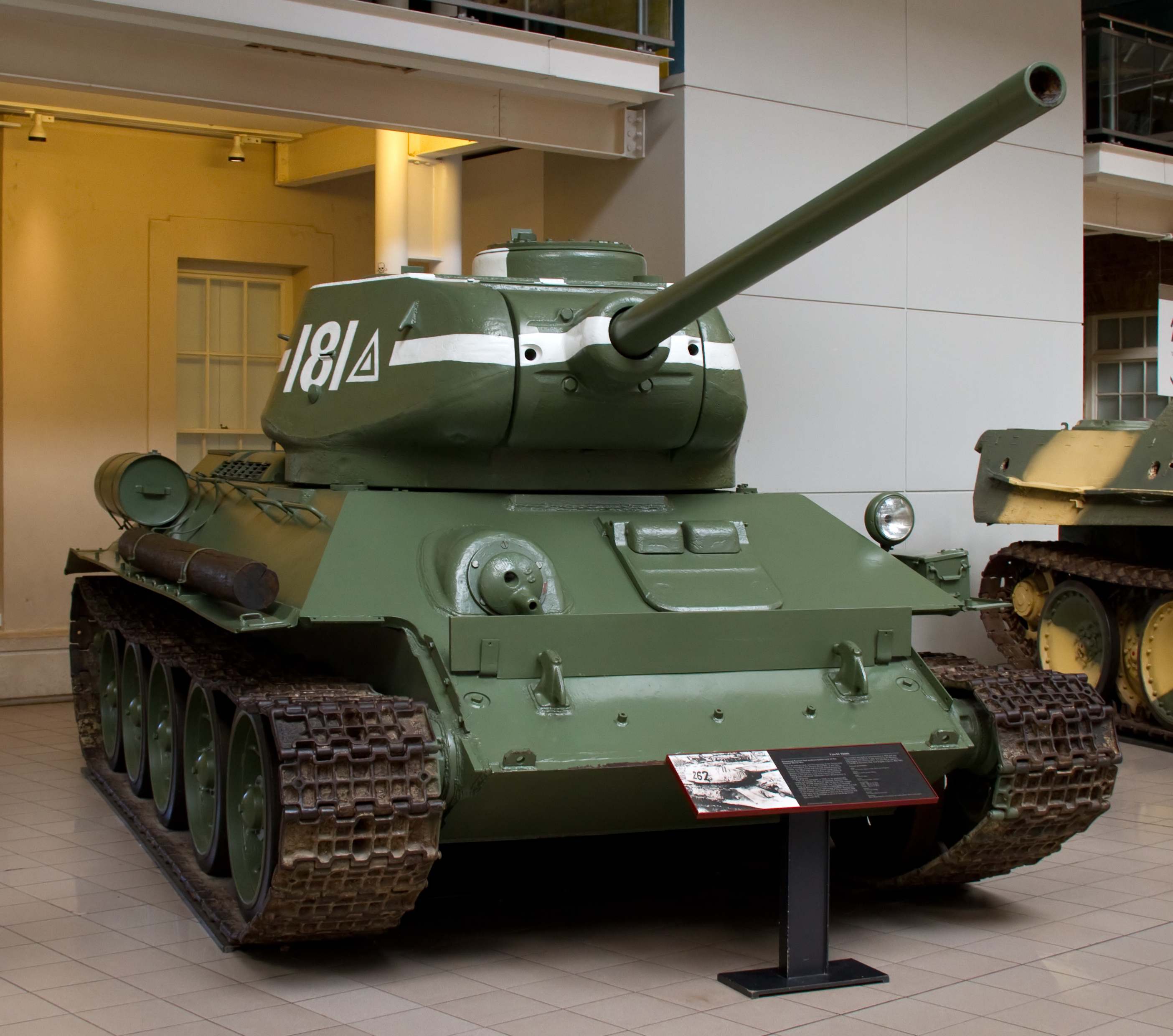
T-34-85 tank on display

The museum's first floor main gallery space houses the permanent exhibitions. These consist of a chronological display which runs around the gallery's 200m perimeter and six thematic displays in "silos" within the space. The walls of the gallery space are used as screens for the projection of an hourly audiovisual presentation, the Big Picture. The main gallery, described as cavernous and dramatic, includes objects such as a Russian T-34 tank, a United States Marine Corps AV-8A Harrier jet, and a British 13-pounder field gun which fired the British Army's first shot of the First World War. The museum also hosts a programme of temporary exhibitions, mounted in a separate gallery.

== Collections ==
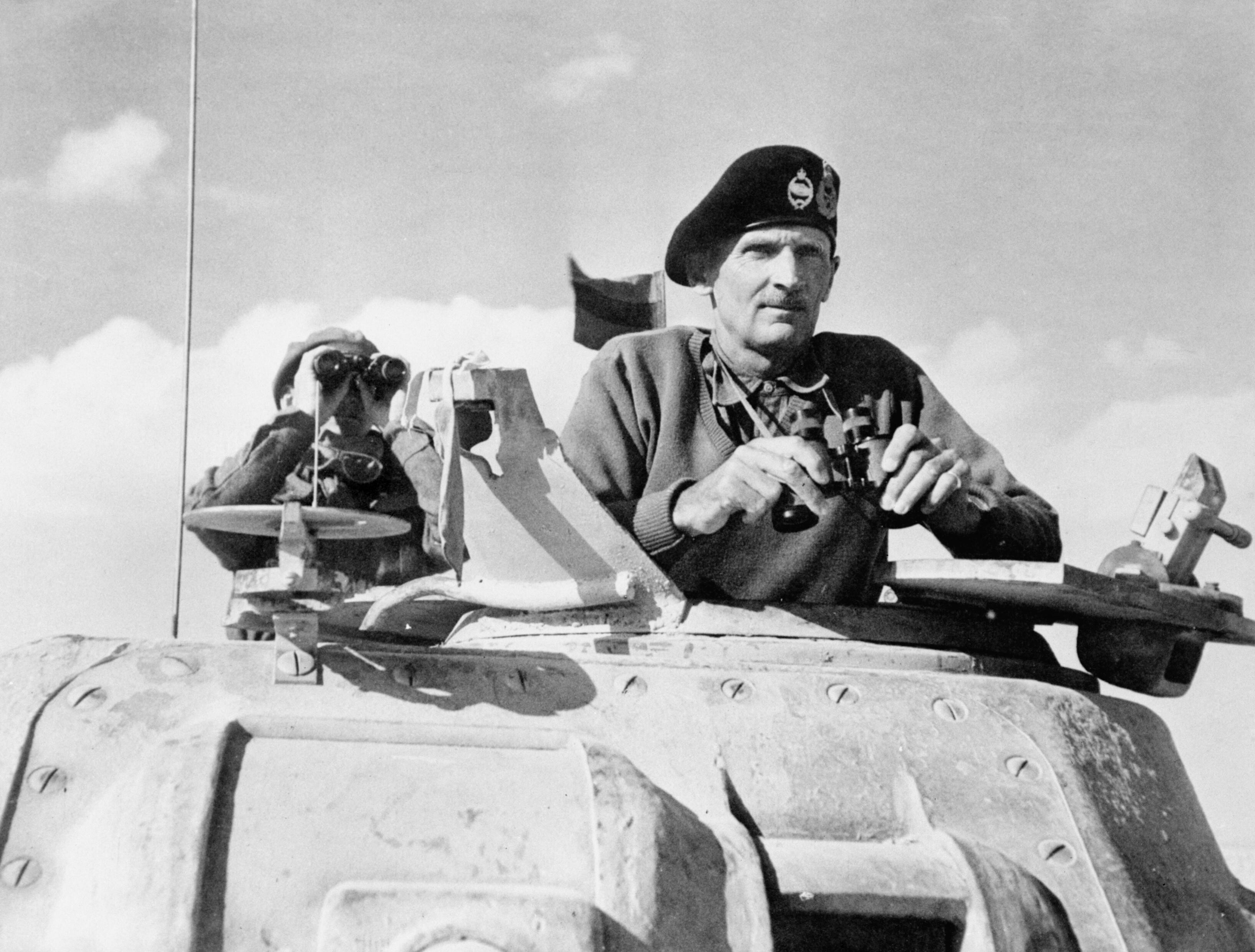
The museum's collection includes this photograph of Montgomery in his tank along with the tank, his command caravans, staff car and his papers.

The Imperial War Museum's original collections date back to the material amassed by the National War Museum Committee. The present departmental organisation came into being during the 1960s as part of Frankland's reorganisation of the museum. The 1970s saw oral history gain increasing prominence and in 1972 the museum created the Department of Sound Records (now the Sound Archive) to record interviews with individuals who had experienced the First World War. The museum maintains an online database of its collections.

=== Documents ===
The museum's documents archive seeks to collect and preserve the private papers of individuals who have experienced modern warfare. The archive's holdings range from the papers of senior British and Commonwealth army, navy and air officers, to the letters, diaries and memoirs of lower-ranked servicemen and of civilians. The collection includes the papers of Field Marshals Bernard Montgomery, and John French. The archive also includes large collections of foreign documents, such as captured German Second World War documents previously held by the Cabinet Office Historical Section, Air Historical Branch and other British government bodies. The foreign collection also includes captured Japanese material transferred from the Cabinet Office. The collection also includes files on Victoria and George Cross recipients, and correspondence relating to the BBC documentary The Great War. The documents collection also includes the UK National Inventory of War Memorials. In 2012 the museum reported its documents collection to contain 24,800 collections of papers.

=== Art ===
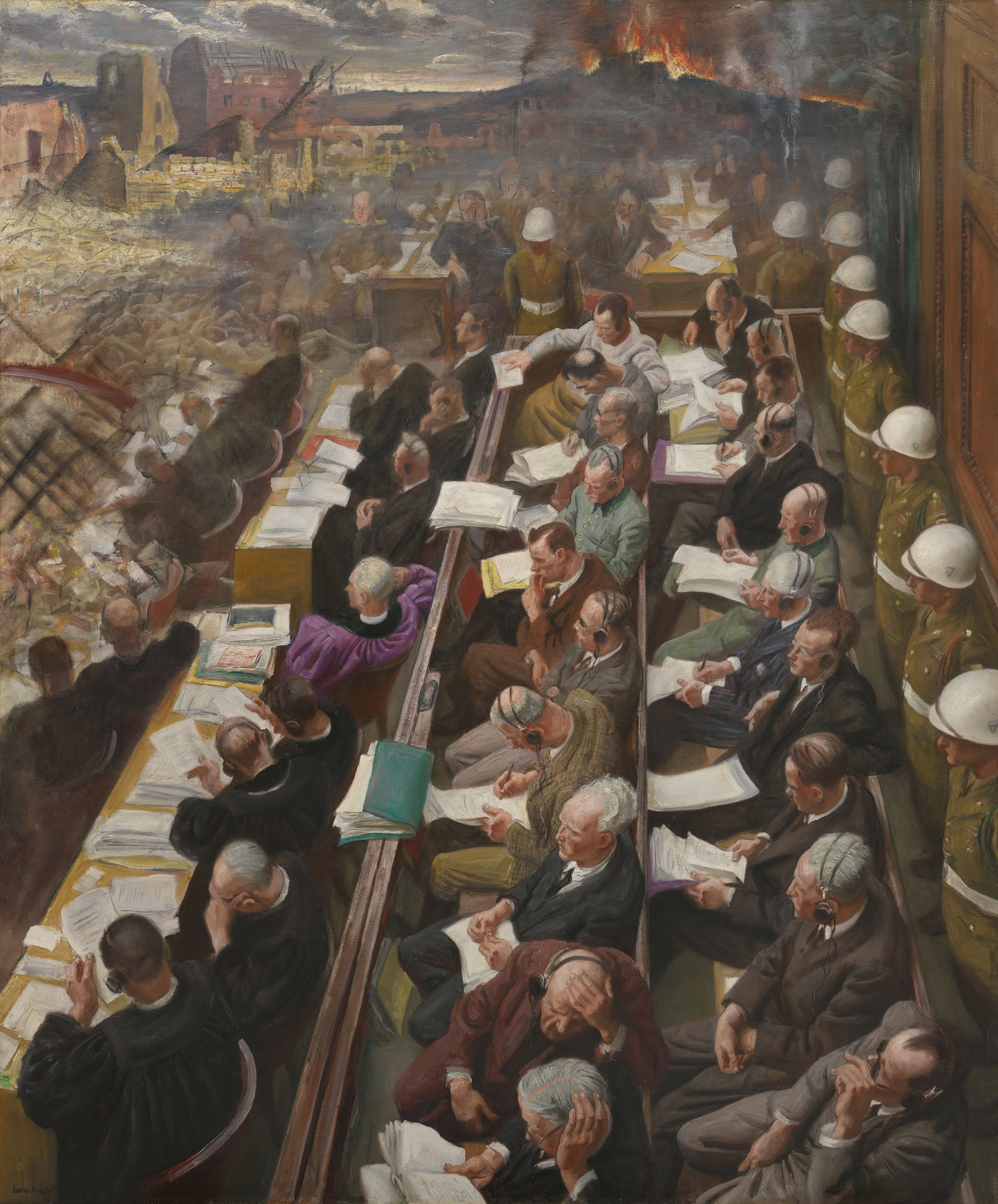
The Nuremberg Trial, 1946, by Laura Knight

The museum's art collection includes paintings, prints, drawings, sculpture, and works in film, photography and sound. The collection originated during the First World War, when the museum acquired works that it had itself commissioned, as well as works commissioned by the Ministry of Information's British War Memorials Committee. As early as 1920 the art collection held over 3,000 works and included pieces by John Singer Sargent, Wyndham Lewis, John Nash and Christopher Nevinson. Notable First World War works include Sargent's Gassed and other works commissioned for an unbuilt Hall of Remembrance. The collection expanded again after the Second World War, receiving thousands of works sponsored by the Ministry of Information's War Artists' Advisory Committee.

In 1972 the museum established the Artistic Records Committee (since renamed the Art Commissions Committee) to commission artists to cover contemporary conflicts. Commissioned artists include Ken Howard, Linda Kitson, John Keane, Peter Howson, Steve McQueen (see Queen and Country) and Langlands & Bell, responding to conflicts in Northern Ireland, the Falklands, the Persian Gulf, Bosnia, Iraq and Afghanistan. The collection also includes over twenty thousand items of publicity material such as posters, postcards, and proclamations from both world wars, and more recent material such as posters issued by anti-war organisations such as the Campaign for Nuclear Disarmament and the Stop the War Coalition. The museum's collection is represented in digital resources such as the Visual Arts Data Service (VADS), and Google Art Project. In 2012 the museum reported the total size of its art collection as 84,980 items.

=== Film ===
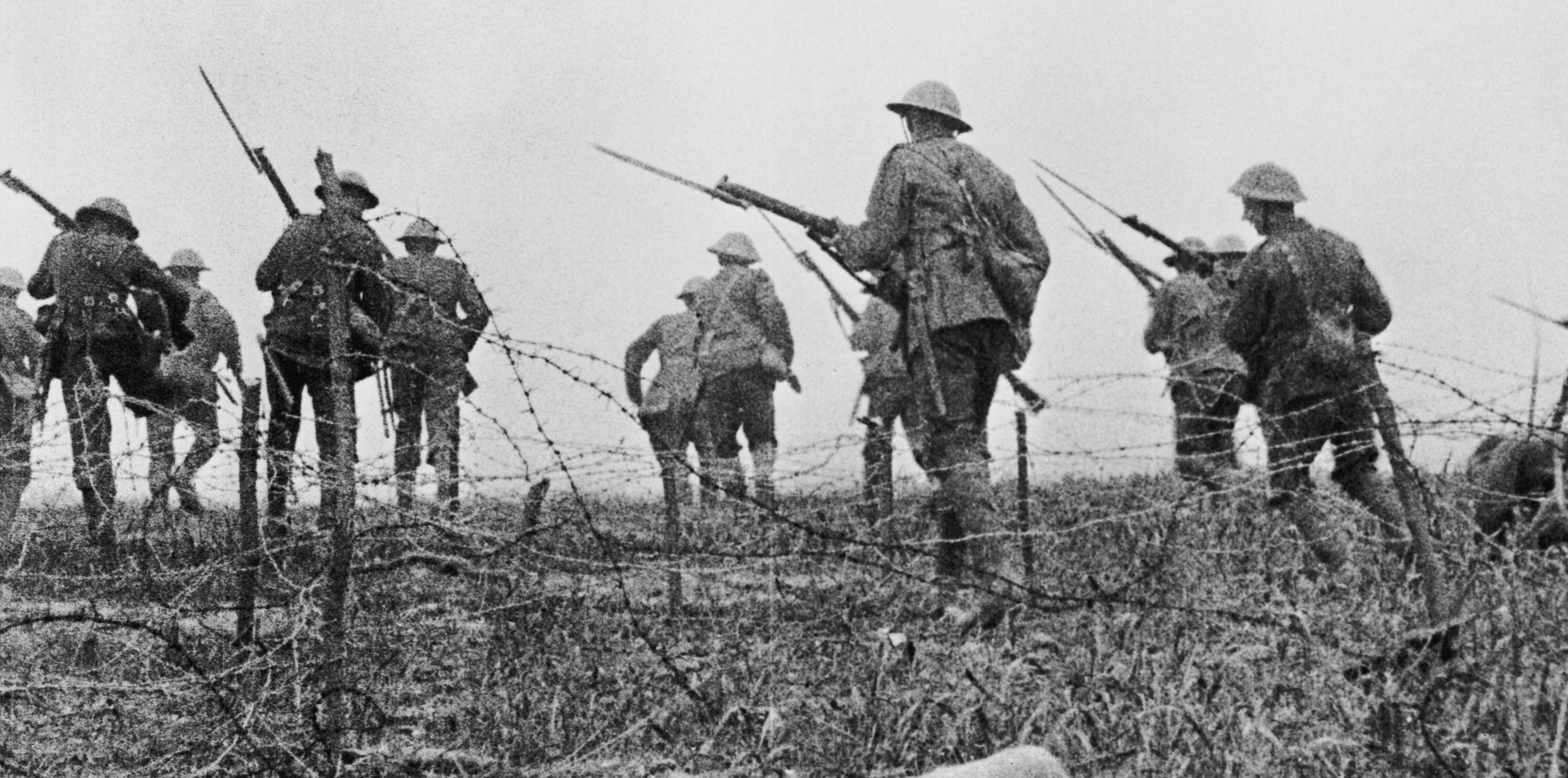
A still from the 1916 documentary and propaganda film The Battle of the Somme, preserved by the museum's film archive

The museum's Film and Video Archive is one of the oldest film archives in the world. The archive preserves a range of historically significant film and video material, including the official British film record of the First World War. Notable among the archive's First World War holdings is The Battle of the Somme, a pioneering 1916 documentary film (which was inscribed on the UNESCO Memory of the World register in 2005), and Der Magische Gürtel, a German 1917 propaganda film about the submarine U-35. The archive's Second World War holdings include unedited film shot by British military cameramen, which document combat actions such as the British landings on D-Day in June 1944, and the liberation of the Bergen-Belsen concentration camp in April 1945.

The archive also holds government information films and propaganda features such as Target for Tonight (1941) and Desert Victory (1943). The archive's post-Second World War collections include material from the Korean War, Cold War material, the former film library of NATO, and material produced by the United Nations UNTV service in Bosnia. As an official repository under the 1958 Public Records Act, the archive continues to receive material from the Ministry of Defence. The archive also seeks to acquire amateur film taken by both service personnel and civilian cameramen. Material from the collection was used in the production of TV documentary series such as The Great War and The World at War. In 2012 the museum reported the size of its film archive as being in excess of 23,000 hours of film, video and digital footage. IWM participated in the national digitising project Unlocking Film Heritage.

=== Photographs ===
The museum's Photograph Archive preserves photographs by official, amateur and professional photographers. The collection includes the official British photographic record of the two world wars; the First World War collection includes the work of photographers such as Ernest Brooks and John Warwick Brooke. The archive also holds 150,000 British aerial photographs from the First World War, the largest collection of its kind. The Second World War collection includes the work of photographers such as Bill Brandt, Cecil Beaton and Bert Hardy. Like the Film Archive, the Photograph Archive is an official repository under the 1958 Public Records Act, and as such continues to receive material from the Ministry of Defence. In 2012 the museum reported the size of its photographic holdings as approximately 11 million images in 17,263 collections.

=== Exhibits ===
The museum's exhibits collection includes a wide range of objects, organised into numerous smaller collections such as uniforms, badges, insignia and flags (including a Canadian Red Ensign carried at Vimy Ridge in 1917, a Union Flag from the 1942 British surrender of Singapore, and another found among the wreckage of the World Trade Center following the September 11 attacks), as well a piece of the towers; personal mementoes, souvenirs and miscellanea such as trench art; orders, medals and decorations (including collections of Victoria and George Crosses); military equipment; firearms and ammunition, ordnance, edged weapons, clubs (such as trench clubs) and other weapons, and vehicles, aircraft and ships. The museum holds the national collection of modern firearms. The firearms collection includes a rifle used by T. E. Lawrence, and an automatic pistol owned by Winston Churchill.

The ordnance collection includes artillery pieces that participated in notable battles, such as the Néry gun, a field gun that was used during the 1914 action at Néry, and equipment captured from enemy forces. The museum's vehicles collection includes Ole Bill, a bus used by British forces in the First World War, and a number of vehicles used by Field Marshal Montgomery during the Second World War. The museum's aircraft collection includes aircraft that are notable for their rarity, such as the only complete and original Royal Aircraft Factory R.E.8 in existence and one of only two surviving TSR-2 strike aircraft, and aircraft associated with particular actions, such as a Supermarine Spitfire flown during the Battle of Britain. The museum's naval collection includes HM Coastal Motor Boat 4 and a midget submarine HMS XE8. In 2012 the museum reported its exhibits collection to contain 155,000 objects and a further 357 vehicles and aircraft.

=== Library ===
The museum's library is a national reference collection on modern conflict, and holds works on all aspects of warfare, including regimental or unit histories (such as 789 rare German unit histories from the First World War), technical manuals, biographical material and works on war's social, cultural, economic, political and military aspects. The library also holds printed ephemera such as the Imperial War Museum Stamp Collection, leaflets and ration books, printed proclamations, newspapers, trench magazines (such The Wipers Times) and trench maps. In 2012 the museum reported its library collection to contain over 80,000 items of historic importance (such as maps, proclamations and rare books) and a further 254,000 items of reference material.

=== Sound ===
The museum's Sound Archive holds 33,000 sound recordings, including a large collection of oral history recordings of witnesses to conflicts since 1914. The museum's sound collection originated in 1972 with the creation of the Department of Sound Records and the instigation of an oral history recording programme. The sound collection opened to the public in July 1977. The collection also includes recordings made by the BBC during the Second World War, actuality sound effects, broadcasts, speeches and poetry. As part of the museum's First World War centenary programme, the museum is producing Voices of the First World War, a podcast series drawing upon the museum's oral history recordings. In 2012 the museum reported the size of its sound collection as 37,000 hours.

=== Databases ===
The IWM has an online database, listing the various items which make up the IWM Collections. In some cases, there are images of the item, or contemporary photos, which can be shared and reused under a Creative Commons Licence.

The War Memorials Register is a database of known war memorials in the United Kingdom. Information such as the material used in construction, the condition of the memorial, its address and coordinates with a satellite map plot are recorded for each of the memorials. Whilst many memorials commemorate those who died in the First World War, the scope of the project is all conflicts. As of 2022, there are over 90,000 memorials on the register.

In 2014, IWM and online genealogy service provider Findmypast entered into a collaboration to launch the "Lives of the First World War" platform. During the centenary period, anyone could sign up for an account, and those who paid for a subscription had the ability to add records from Findmypast's collections.

A number of sources (War Office medal index cards, Canadian Expeditionary Force attestations, Royal Navy service records etc.) had been used as seeding documents to create individual entries in the database. Each person's profile in the database could have been further built up, so as to document when that person was born, when they died, family members etc. If a person needed to be added, or a duplicate existed that needed to be merged, such activity was requested via a support forum handled by IWM volunteers. A user with a subscription had the ability to group person profiles together into a "community". This could be a grouping based around a ship's crew, a unit in the army, or the names of men and women buried in a given war cemetery.

The goal was to encourage crowdsourcing to build up as many details as possible in the database, and to tap into the popularity of online genealogy as a pastime. One selling point of the platform was that the data thus captured would form a "permanent digital memorial [that] will be saved for future generations." The IWM declared that the data from the platform would become part of its archive when the platform ceased to be interactive in 2019, "and will be free to access online for research."

=== Size of collection ===
The museum holds around half a petabyte of digitised data (as of 2017). This is held in Duxford (Cambridgeshire) on two SpectraLogic T950 tape libraries, with a distance of 500m between them. One is a LTO-5 (Linear Tape-Open) tape library, the other is IBM TS1150.

== Selected collection highlights ==
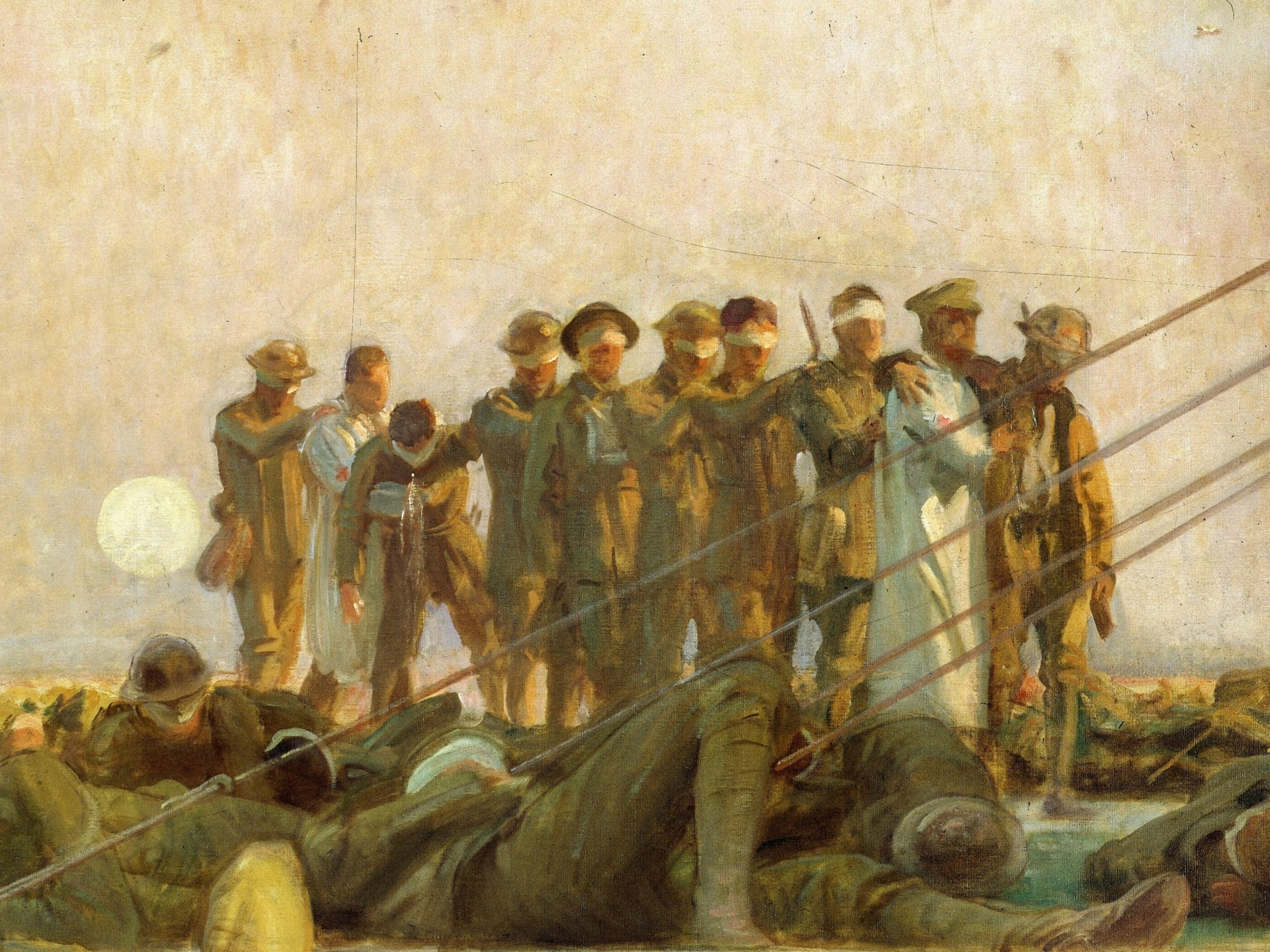
John Singer Sargent

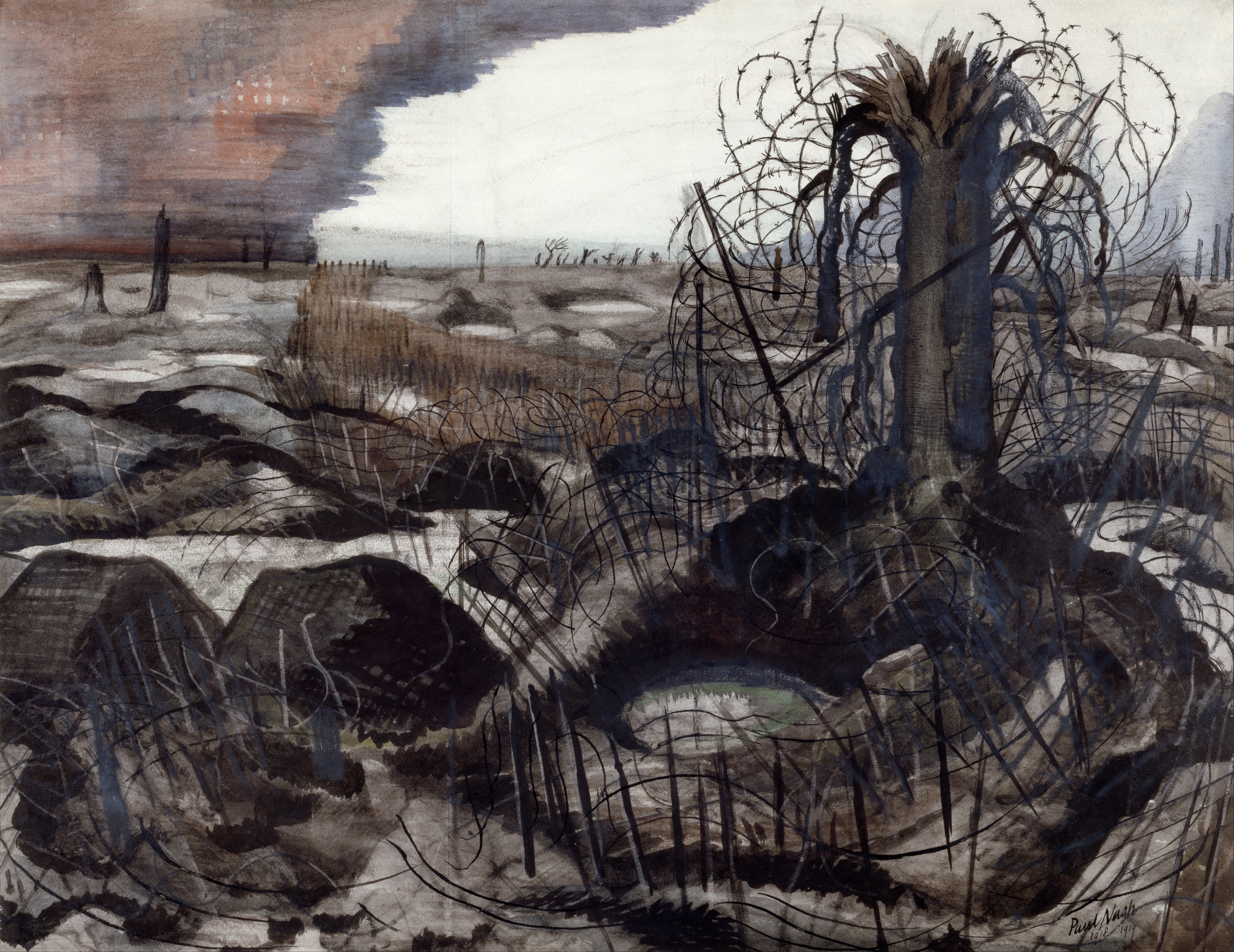
Paul Nash

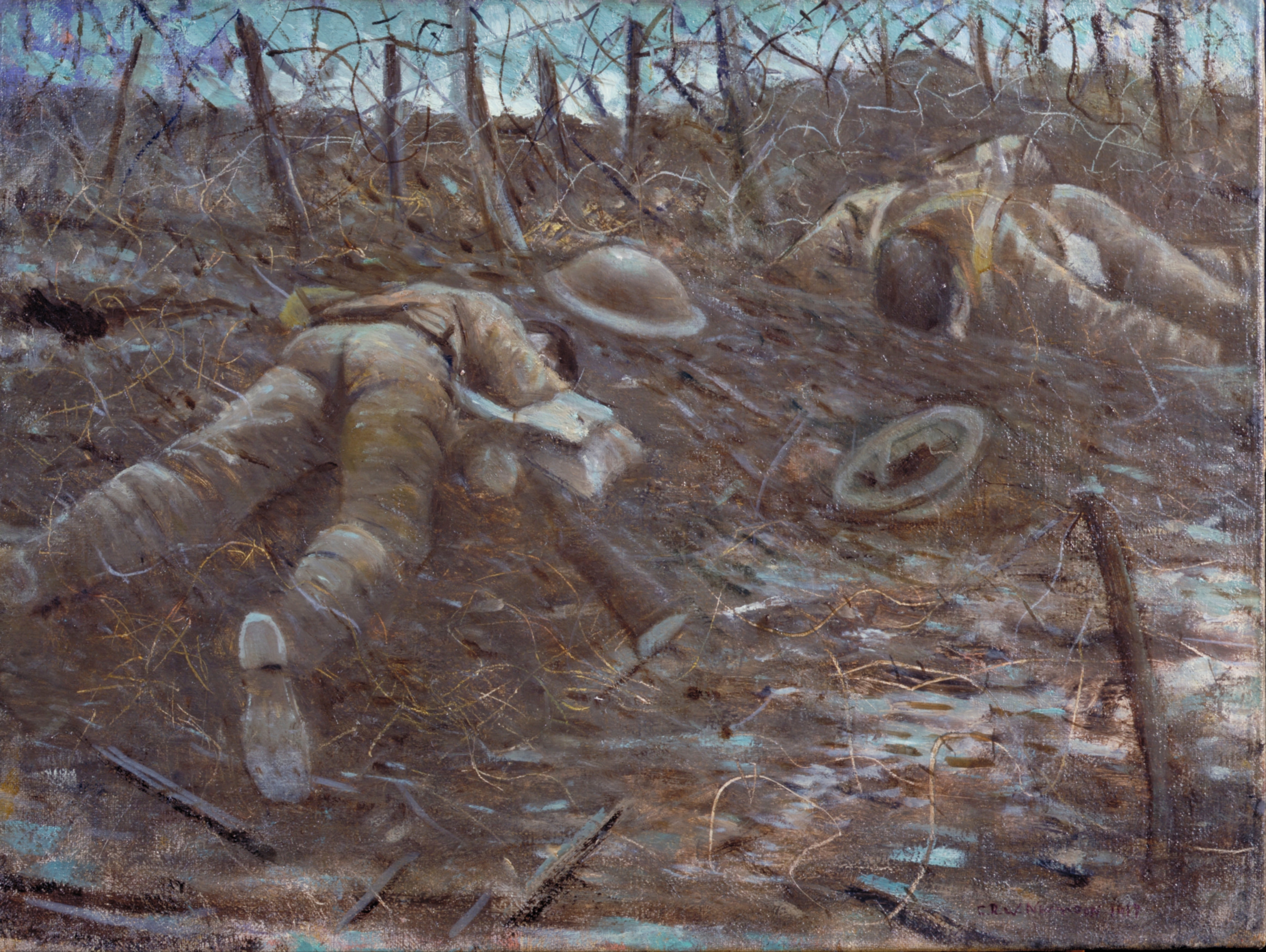
C. R. W. Nevinson

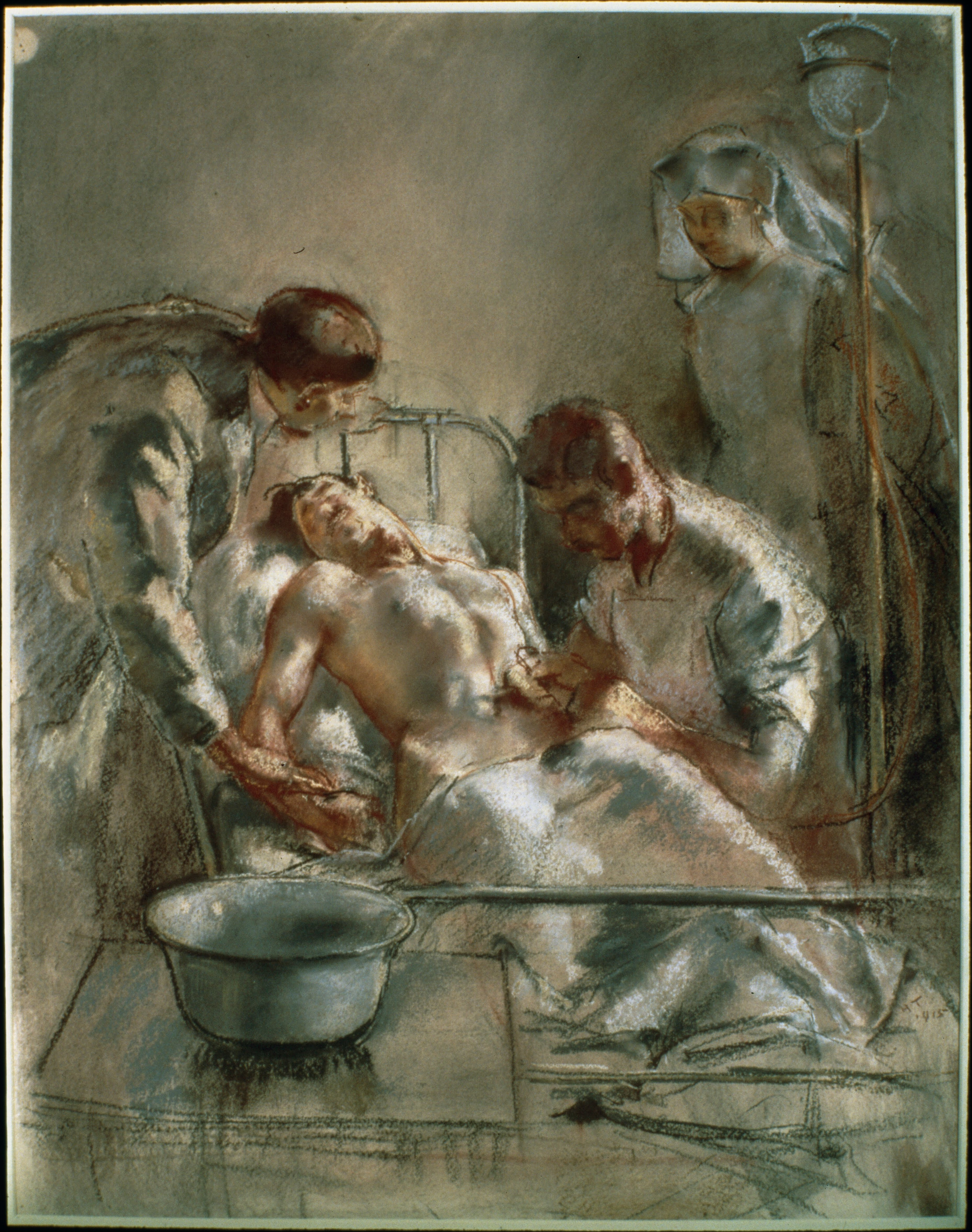
Henry Tonks

== Governance ==
The Imperial War Museum is an executive non-departmental public body under the Department for Culture, Media and Sport, from which it receives financial support in the form of a grant-in-aid. The governance of the museum is the responsibility of a Board of Trustees, originally established by the Imperial War Museum Act 1920, later amended by the Imperial War Museum Act 1955 and the Museums and Galleries Act 1992 and other relevant legislation.

The board comprises a president (currently Prince Edward, Duke of Kent) who is appointed by the sovereign, and fourteen members appointed in varying proportions by the Prime Minister, and the Foreign, Defence, and Culture Secretaries. Seven further members are Commonwealth High Commissioners appointed ex officio by their respective governments. As of December 2023, the Chairman of the Trustees is Sir Guy Weston, Chairman of the Garfield Weston Foundation, and his deputy is Sherin Aminossehe.

Past chairmen have included Admiral Sir Deric Holland-Martin (1967–77), Admiral of the Fleet Sir Algernon Willis and Marshal of the Royal Air Force Sir John Grandy (trustee 1971–78, chairman 1978–89). During the Second World War Grandy had commanded RAF Duxford, and was chairman during the planning of Duxford's American Air Museum, which opened in 1997.

The museum's director-general is answerable to the trustees and acts as accounting officer.

Since 1917 the museum has had six directors. The first was Sir Martin Conway, a noted art historian, mountaineer and explorer. He was knighted in 1895 for his efforts to map the Karakoram mountain range of the Himalayas, and was Slade Professor of Fine Arts at the University of Cambridge from 1901 to 1904. Conway held the post of director until his death in 1937, when he was succeeded by Leslie Bradley. Bradley had served in the First World War in the Middlesex Regiment before being invalided out in 1917. He later became acquainted with Charles ffoulkes, who invited him to join the museum where he was initially engaged in assembling the museum's poster collection. Bradley retired in 1960 and was succeeded by Dr Noble Frankland. Frankland had served as a navigator in RAF Bomber Command, winning a Distinguished Flying Cross. While a Cabinet Office official historian he co-authored a controversial official history of the RAF strategic air campaign against Germany. Frankland retired in 1982 and was succeeded by Dr Alan Borg who had previously been at the Sainsbury Centre for Visual Arts. In 1995 Borg moved to the Victoria and Albert Museum and was succeeded by Sir Robert Crawford, who had originally been recruited by Frankland as a research assistant in 1968. Upon Crawford's retirement in 2008 he was succeeded by Diane Lees, previously director of the V&A Museum of Childhood. She was noted in the media as the first woman appointed to lead a British national museum. The current director-general is Caro Howell, who was previously director of the Foundling Museum, and assumed the role in May 2023.

== Arms ==
Coat of arms of Imperial War Museum
Adopted 10 February 1969 Crest Out of an ancient crown Or, in front of an embattled gate gules, the portcullis raised sable, a lion passant guardant crowned Or. Escutcheon Gules, a trophy composed of a spade and hammer with two swords, all in saltire, and conjoined wings in fess surmounted by an anchor, in chief a chain enarched, all Or. Motto THAT THE PAST MAY SERVE
