= Robert Crawford (historian) =

Sir Robert William Kenneth Crawford, CBE (born 3 July 1945) is a former director general of the Imperial War Museum.

Educated at Culford School in Suffolk and Pembroke College, Oxford (MA, modern history, 1967), he joined the Imperial War Museum as a research assistant in 1968 and progressed to head of research and information, keeper of the department of photographs, and assistant director. Then in 1982 he became deputy director-general before becoming director-general in 1995, which he served as until his retirement in October 2008. He was chairman of the National Museum Directors' Conference from 2001 to 2006. He was also the deputy chairman of the Museums Documentation Association from 1998 to 2006 and a member of the National Historic Ships Committee until 2006.

Crawford is chairman of the Greenwich Foundation for the Old Royal Naval College and a trustee of the Horniman Museum and Gardens, Royal Logistic Corps Museum Trust, National Maritime Museum, National Museums Liverpool, National Museum of the Royal Navy and Chatham Historic Dockyard. He is a Liveryman of the Worshipful Company of Glovers and was made a Freeman of the City of London in 1998.

Crawford was appointed a Commander of the Order of the British Empire in 2002 for services to museums and a Knight Bachelor in the 2007 New Year Honours.
