= Naming Commission =

American military commission

The Naming Commission
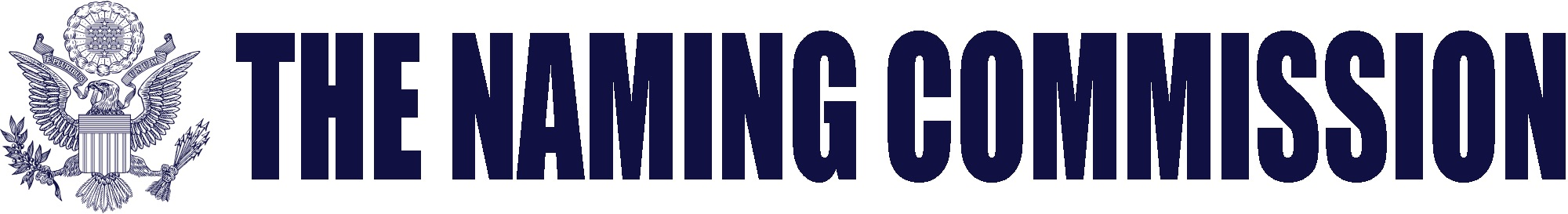
- Commission wordmark

Commission overview
- Formed: March 2, 2021; 5 years ago
- Dissolved: October 1, 2022; 3 years ago
- Type: Federal commission
- Jurisdiction: Department of Defense
- Annual budget: $2 million (total for life of commission)
- Commission executives: Michelle Howard, Chair; Ty Seidule, Vice Chair
- Key document: National Defense Authorization Act for Fiscal Year 2021
- Website: Archived website

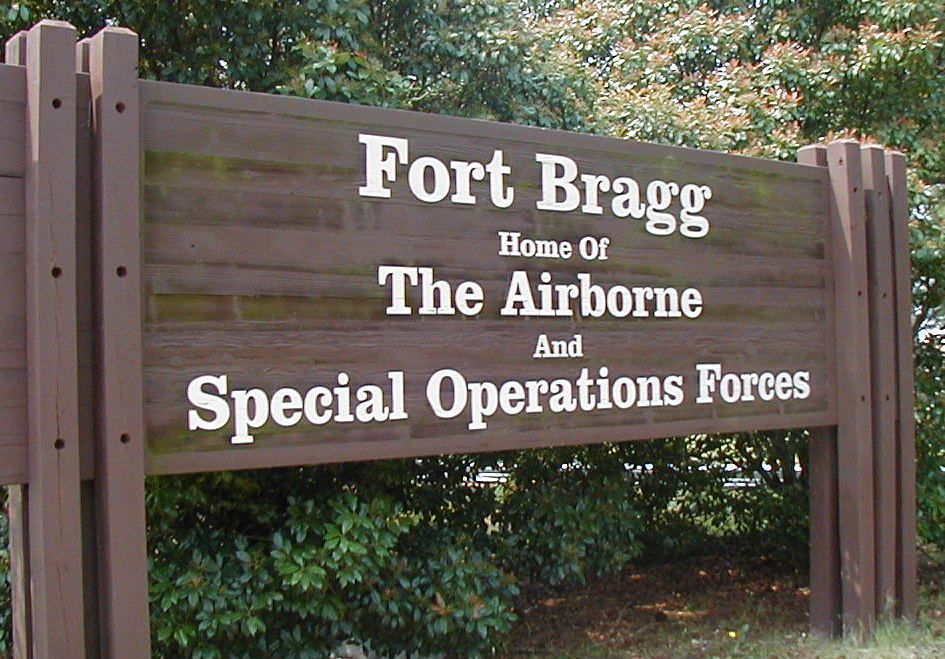
The commission considered and provided recommendations on U.S. bases named for Confederate soldiers, such as Fort Bragg, one of the largest military installations in the world, which was named for Confederate General Braxton Bragg

The Commission on the Naming of Items of the Department of Defense that Commemorate the Confederate States of America or Any Person Who Served Voluntarily with the Confederate States of America, more commonly referred to as the Naming Commission, was a United States government commission created by the United States Congress in 2021 to create a list of military assets with names associated with the Confederate States of America and recommendations for their removal.

In the summer of 2020, the George Floyd protests and resulting removal of Confederate monuments drew attention to the U.S. Army installations named for Confederate soldiers. These installations and other defense property were generally named in the early to mid-20th century at the height of the Jim Crow era to court support from Southerners.

In response, lawmakers added a provision for a renaming commission to the William M. (Mac) Thornberry National Defense Authorization Act for Fiscal Year 2021 (NDAA). Enacted on January 1, 2021, the law was passed over President Donald Trump's veto. The law required the commission to develop a list that could be used to "remove all names, symbols, displays, monuments, and paraphernalia that honor or commemorate the Confederate States of America or any person who served voluntarily with the Confederate States of America from all assets of the Department of Defense." The law required the Secretary of Defense to implement the plan within three years of its enactment.

In summer and fall 2022, the commission delivered its report and recommendations to Congress in three parts. It disbanded on October 1, 2022, after fulfilling its duties to Congress.

On October 6, Secretary of Defense Lloyd Austin declared in a memo that he concurred with all the commission's recommendations and was committed to implementing them as soon as possible, within legal constraints. On January 5, 2023, William A. LaPlante, U.S. under secretary of defense for acquisition and sustainment (USD (A&S)), directed the Department to implement all of the commission's recommendations.

In June 2025, the Army announced that all of the bases that were formerly named after Confederate officers will be reverted to their original names, except with new namesakes being used. The Defense Secretary claimed that the change was “important for morale". The process of restoring the original names of all nine US Army posts was completed on June 11, 2025.

While all of the Naming Commission's recommendations for US Army posts have been reversed under the guise of using new namesakes with identical surnames, the US Navy's changes remain in place as of 2026, such as the Ticonderoga-class cruiser USS Robert Smalls (CG-62) (formerly USS Chancellorsville) and the Superintendent's residence at the United States Naval Academy, Farragut House (formerly Buchanan House).

== Legislative history ==
On June 9, 2020, Sen. Elizabeth Warren (D-MA) announced that she had "filed an amendment to the annual defense bill last week to rename all bases named for Confederate generals." On June 11, 2020, Reps. Anthony Brown (D-MD) and Don Bacon (R-NE) introduced H.R.7155, National Commission on Modernizing Military Installation Designations Act. The bill received support from 30 total co-sponsors, including 3 Republicans.

The Senate Armed Services Committee (SASC) completed its markup of the FY2021 NDAA on June 11, 2020, and the bill reported out by committee included Warren's provision. Warren's provision to direct the renaming of the bases was altered to an approach that used a commission after Sen. Martha McSally (R-AZ) indicated her support to remove the names. Sens. Mike Rounds (R-SD) and Joni Ernst (R-IA) publicly said that they supported the amendment to change base names.

During consideration of the FY2021 NDAA by the House Armed Services Committee (HASC) on July 1, 2020, Brown offered an amendment, which was co-led with Bacon, to directly require the Secretary of Defense to rename any defense property that is named after any person who served in the political or military leadership of any armed rebellion against the United States. The amendment offered by Brown passed by a vote of 33–23, with Republicans Bacon and Paul Mitchell (R-MI) joining in support. The committee unanimously voted to report the NDAA favorably to the House.

At a July 9, 2020, hearing in HASC, Chairman of the Joint Chiefs of Staff Mark Milley said, "I personally think that the original decisions to name those bases after Confederate bases were political decisions back in the 1910s and '20s....The American Civil War was fought, and it was an act of rebellion. It was an act of treason at the time against the Union. Against the stars and stripes. Against the U.S. Constitution. And those officers turned their backs on their oath."

On November 18, 2020, Speaker Nancy Pelosi named the House Democratic members of the conference committee for the NDAA and in doing so stated that "this summer, the House and Senate on a bipartisan basis passed NDAAs with provisions to begin the process of changing the names of military bases and infrastructure named after individuals who served in the Confederacy. It is imperative that the conference report include provisions that secure this essential priority. Our bases should reflect our highest ideals as Americans."

Conference negotiations over the provisions were tense and threatened a failure to pass the NDAA for the first time in its 60-year history. On November 20, 2020, the Congressional Black Caucus adopted a formal position that the final conference report for the NDAA "must include a provision mandating the redesignation of Department of Defense property honoring the Confederacy."

On December 2, 2020, the conference committee reported out the conference report, which receded to the Senate language without amendment and incorporated the text as section 370 in the final bill. The House of Representatives agreed to the conference report by a vote of 335–78 on December 8, 2020, and the Senate followed suit on December 11, 2020, passing it 84–13. On December 23, 2020, President Trump vetoed the legislation, saying, "These locations have taken on significance to the American story and those who have helped write it that far transcends their namesakes...I have been clear in my opposition to politically motivated attempts like this to wash away history and to dishonor the immense progress our country has fought for in realizing our founding principles."

On December 28, 2020, in the last vote of the 116th Congress in the House of Representatives, the House voted to override President Trump's veto by 322–87, including 109 Republicans and 1 Independent who voted yea. On January 1, 2021, in the last vote of the 116th Congress, the Senate voted to override President Trump's veto by 81–13, passing the commission into law. The passage of the FY2021 NDAA was the 60th consecutive time that such legislation had been passed and is the only instance in which it was enacted over the objection of the president.

== Activities of the commission ==
The commission was chartered with five primary activities:

1. Assessing the cost of renaming or removing names, symbols, displays, monuments, or paraphernalia that commemorate the Confederate States of America or any person who served voluntarily with the Confederate States of America.
2. Developing procedures and criteria to assess whether an existing name, symbol, monument, display, or paraphernalia commemorates the Confederate States of America or person who served voluntarily with the Confederate States of America.
3. Recommending procedures for renaming assets of the Department of Defense to prevent commemoration of the Confederate States of America or any person who served voluntarily with the Confederate States of America.
4. Developing a plan to remove names, symbols, displays, monuments, or paraphernalia that commemorate the Confederate States of America or any person who served voluntarily with the Confederate States of America from assets of the Department of Defense, within the timeline established by this Act.
5. Including in the plan procedures and criteria for collecting and incorporating local sensitivities associated with naming or renaming of assets of the Department of Defense.

The commission was authorized $2 million to conduct its work, and had to brief the House and Senate Armed Services Committees on its progress by October 1, 2021, and then present a final briefing and written report to the armed services committees by October 1, 2022, which it accomplished while spending less than half the funding it was authorized. The commission met biweekly and briefed the Secretary of Defense on its progress and recommendations. The commission's focus throughout the summer and fall of 2021 consisted of visiting the nine Army installations named for those who voluntarily served in the Confederacy. The commission met with installation leadership to gauge their level of planning and their local assessments.

The commission expanded their investigation of military assets to include assets with names that commemorate other Civil War era events or places to see if the name has a connection to the Confederacy. Examples given are USS Antietam (CG-54) and Fort Belvoir.

Until December 1, 2021, the commission had collected suggestions from the general public for possible replacement names for the military assets that the Department of Defense may finally decide to rename. After receiving thousands of suggestions, the commission posted a list of 90 names in March 2022 that it plans to consider as possible replacement names for the nine Army installations before the list is further narrowed to produce the list of finalists.

In March 2022, the commission determined that Fort Belvoir does not meet the criteria provided in the 2021 National Defense Authorization Act for a renaming recommendation but the commission recommends that the Department of Defense conduct its own naming review of the post, based on results of the commission's historical research. At end of the same month, the commission posted a list of 758 Defense Department items at U.S. military installations in the United States, Germany and Japan with ties to the Confederacy. Many of the items on the list are streets, signs, paintings and buildings. Included on the list, Arlington National Cemetery has a memorial dedicated to Confederate war dead which includes "highly sanitized depictions of slavery".

== Members ==
The eight-person commission was composed of four representatives appointed by the United States Secretary of Defense and one appointee each by the chairmen and ranking members of the Senate Committee on Armed Services and House Committee on Armed Services.

On January 8, 2021, Christopher C. Miller—the acting Defense Secretary for the outgoing Trump administration—appointed the four DoD representatives: "Sean McLean, a White House associate director; Joshua Whitehouse, the White House liaison to the Defense Department who was involved in some of the post-election purges at the Pentagon; Ann T. Johnston, acting Assistant Secretary of Defense for Legislative Affairs; and Earl G. Matthews, an Army National Guard colonel who previously served as principal deputy general counsel for the Army and on Trump's National Security Council."

On January 29, 2021, following the January 20 inauguration of Joe Biden, the new administration halted all appointments that had not yet completed paperwork, including the four Secretary of Defense appointments to the commission. On February 12, 2021, Defense Secretary Lloyd Austin announced new appointments to the position, followed immediately after by the Democratic chairmen and ranking Republicans on the House and Senate Armed Services Committees.

On March 2, it was announced that Smithsonian Secretary Lonnie Bunch had to withdraw from the commission for personal reasons prior to the swearing-in ceremony. Eight days later, Congressman Smith replaced Bunch with former Obama administration official Lawrence Romo.

Michelle Howard was the chair of the committee with Ty Seidule serving as the vice-chair. U.S. Army Major General Deborah Kotulich served as the chief of staff of the Army Support Team to the Naming Commission starting in November 2021 until it was dissolved.

Photo	Member	Title	Appointed by	Notes
	Michelle Howard	Admiral, U.S. Navy, retired	Secretary of Defense Lloyd Austin	Committee chair. Before retirement from active service in 2017, Howard became the highest ranking woman in United States Armed Forces history and the third African-American to achieve the rank of four-star admiral.
	Ty Seidule	Brigadier General, U.S. Army, retired	Secretary of Defense Lloyd Austin	Committee vice-chair. Emeritus Professor of History at the United States Military Academy, and author of the 2021 book Robert E. Lee and Me: A Southerner's Reckoning with the Myth of the Lost Cause (ISBN 978-1-250-23926-6)
	Robert Neller	General, U.S. Marine Corps, retired	Secretary of Defense Lloyd Austin	Retired as the 37th Commandant of the Marine Corps.
	Kori Schake	Director of Foreign & Defense Policy Studies, American Enterprise Institute	Secretary of Defense Lloyd Austin	Has held senior positions in both the Defense and State Departments and advised the 2008 presidential campaign of John McCain.
	Thomas P. Bostick	Lieutenant General, U.S. Army, retired	Chairman of the Senate Armed Services Committee Jack Reed (D-RI)	The first African American graduate of West Point to serve as Chief of Engineers of the U.S. Army and Commanding General of the U.S. Army Corps of Engineers
	Jerry Buchanan	Oklahoma businessman, Sergeant, U.S. Army, retired	Ranking Member of the Senate Armed Services Committee James Inhofe (R-OK)	An alternate member of the Oklahoma State Election Board, former chairman of the Tulsa County Republican Party, and retired U.S. Army drill sergeant
	Lawrence Romo	Lieutenant Colonel, U.S. Air Force, retired	Chairman of the House Armed Services Committee Adam Smith (D-WA)	Former director of the Selective Service System during the Obama Administration. Currently national commander of the American GI Forum.
	Austin Scott	Congressman (R-GA-8)	Ranking Member of the House Armed Services Committee Mike Rogers (R-AL)	A member of the House Armed Services Committee from a district with several military installations in a state with two bases named after Confederate generals: Fort Benning and Fort Gordon. In 2001, Scott was the first Republican in the Georgia House of Representatives to work with Democrats to remove the Confederate battle emblem from the state's flag.

== Items with Confederate names ==
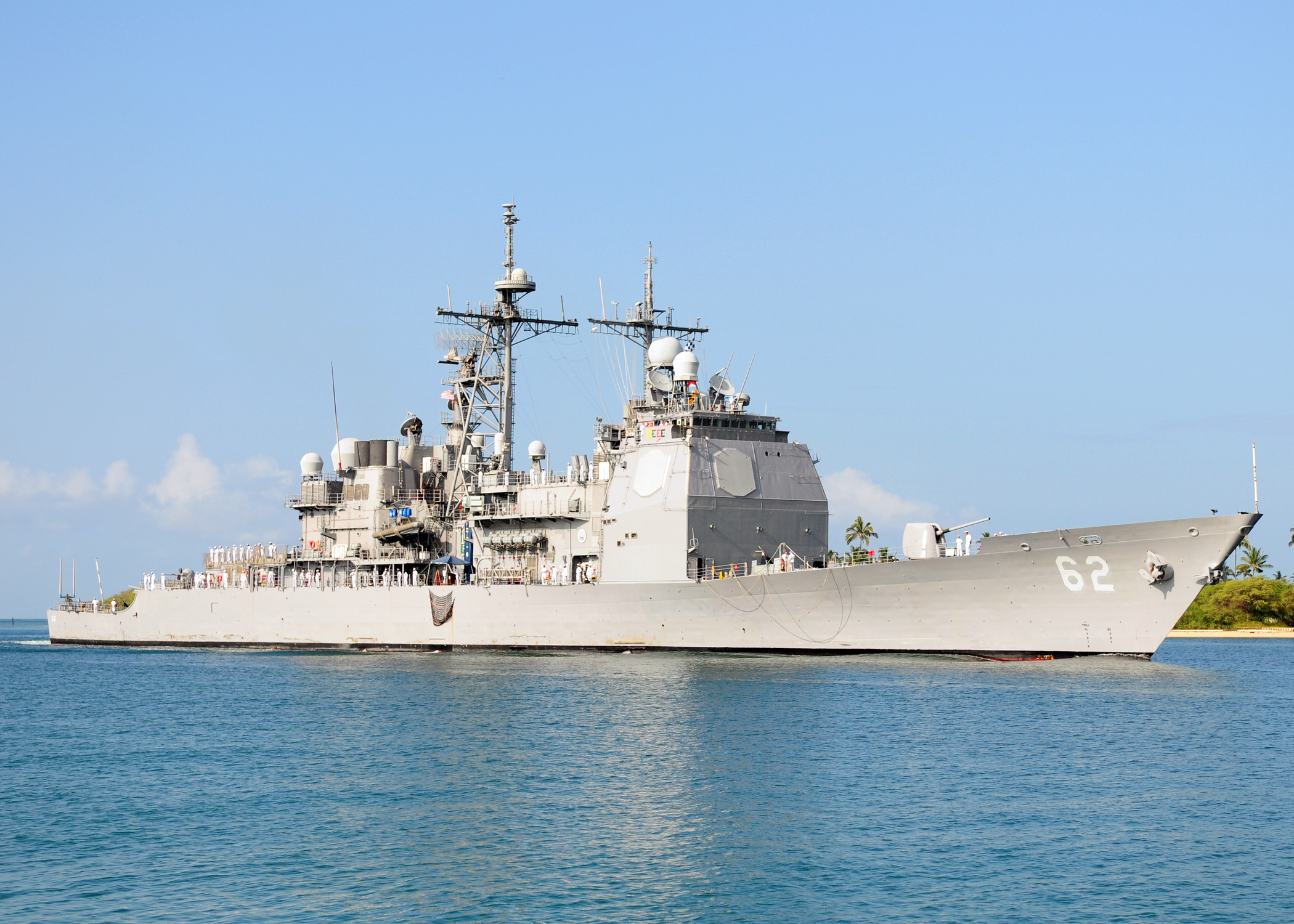
USS Chancellorsville was named after a victory by the Confederate Army over the U.S. Army

Below is a list of U.S. military assets that may be affected by the NDAA:

=== Army ===
- List of U.S. Army installations named for Confederate soldiers
- The United States Military Academy has a dormitory, a road, and an entrance gate that honor alumni who served in the Confederate Army.
- Army National Guard units that can trace their lineage to state militia units that had served as a part of the Confederate Army, such as the 116th Infantry Regiment of the Virginia Army National Guard and the 118th Infantry Regiment of the South Carolina Army National Guard, were allowed under U.S. Army regulations from 1949 until 2023 to carry campaign streamers that commemorate Confederate victories over the United States. In its final report, the Naming Commission recommended that the Secretary of Defense to have the Secretary of the Army revoke the 1949 exemption that allowed the display of campaign streamers not associated with U.S. Army service. The Department of the Army implemented this recommendation the following year.
- Fort Belvoir was added to the list in May 2021 by the commission since the current name of the base commemorates a slave plantation that previously occupied the site. The base opened in 1917 as Camp A. A. Humphreys, named in honor of Union general Andrew A. Humphreys. The fort was renamed in 1935 at the request of Congressman Howard W. Smith (D-VA), an "avowed white supremacist". In March 2022, the commission determined that the fort did not meet the criteria provided in the 2021 NDAA but recommends that the DoD conduct its own naming review of the post.
- Arlington National Cemetery has streets named after Robert E. Lee and Stonewall Jackson, and the Confederate Memorial which includes "highly sanitized depictions of slavery" (dedicated by President Woodrow Wilson on June 4, 1914, the 106th anniversary of the birth of Jefferson Davis). Recommendation for the removal of the Confederate Memorial was included in the final report and must be complete by the end of 2023. The current plan is to remove of all bronze elements from the statue while leaving the granite base and foundation in place to avoid disturbing surrounding graves.
- Redstone Arsenal has a laboratory named after CSA general Josiah Gorgas.

=== Navy ===
- List of United States Navy ships commemorating the Confederate States of America
- USS Chancellorsville, a ship named for a battle in which a larger Union army was defeated by a much smaller Confederate force. As recently as 2016, the ship's wardroom had a painting of Confederate generals Lee and Jackson. In February 2023, the Secretary of the Navy announced that the Chancellorsville will be renamed USS Robert Smalls sometime later in 2023 in commemoration of Robert Smalls, a slave who had commandeered a Confederate transport ship, CSS Planter, and had later served in Congress.
- USNS Maury, a ship named for an officer in the Confederate navy. In March 2023, the Secretary of the Navy announced that the USNS Maury be renamed USNS Marie Tharp in honor of geologist and oceanographic cartographer Marie Tharp who had helped to produce the scientific map of the Atlantic Ocean floor.
- USS Antietam, a ship named after the Battle of Antietam. Although considered a Union victory, the battle was tactically inconclusive since General George B. McClellan failed to crush the much smaller Confederate force under Robert E. Lee
- The United States Naval Academy had an engineering building (Maury Hall) and the superintendent house (Buchanan House) that honor naval officers who had served in the Confederate Navy. In February 2023, the Naval Academy officially renamed Maury Hall as Carter Hall in honor of former U.S. president and USNA alumnus Jimmy Carter. In May 2023, the superintendent's house was officially renamed Farragut House in honor of Admiral David Farragut.

=== Air Force ===
- Fairchild Air Force Base in Spokane, Washington, has a building named after CSA President Jefferson Davis and a street named after Robert E. Lee.

== Lists of names ==
=== List of considered names ===
In March 2022, the commission published a list of 90 names it considered for use in renaming the nine Army bases:

- John Aiso
- Alexander Augusta
- Vernon Baker (Note: Korean War (1950–1953) Medal of Honor recipient)
- Van Barfoot (Note: World War II (1941–1945) Medal of Honor recipient)
- Powhatan Beaty (Note: Civil War (1860–1865) Medal of Honor recipient)
- Roy Benavidez (Note: Vietnam War (1964–1974) Medal of Honor recipient)
- Omar Bradley (Note: War time general)
- Ruby Bradley
- William Bryant (Note: Died in combat during Vietnam War)
- Jose Calugas
- William Carney
- Alwyn Cashe (Note: Iraq War (2003–2011) Medal of Honor recipient)
- Richard Cavazos (Note: Peace time general)
- Cornelius Charlton (Note: Died in combat during Korean War)
- Charles Chibitty
- Ernest Childers
- Mary Clarke
- Mitchell Red Cloud
- Harold Cohen
- Felix Conde-Falcón
- Courage
- Bruce Crandall (Note: One of the few nominees who were still alive at the time of nomination in March 2022) & Ed Freeman
- Benjamin Davis, Sr.
- Ernest Dervishian
- Desmond Doss
- Charity Earley
- Dwight Eisenhower
- Marcario García
- James Gavin
- Eduardo Gomez
- Gary Gordon (Note: Battle of Mogadishu (1993) Medal of Honor recipient) (Note: Died in combat during Battle of Mogadishu) & Randall Shughart
- Arthur Gregg
- Barney Hajiro
- Kimberly Hampton (Note: Died in combat during Iraq War)
- Anna Hays
- Rodolfo Hernández
- Robert Howard
- Lawrence Joel
- William Henry Johnson (Note: World War I (1917–1919) Medal of Honor recipient)
- Hazel Johnson-Brown
- Charles Kelly
- Mildred Kelly
- Charles Kettles
- Milton Lee
- José López
- John Magrath (Note: Died in combat during World War II)
- George Marshall
- Frank Merrill
- Jimmie Monteith
- Hal & Julia Moore (Note: Although Julia Moore was a civilian and never a sworn member of the military, she spent most of her life living on an U.S. Army base as a daughter of colonel and a wife of a general and she had served her country by find ways to improve the lives of the common soldier and their dependents.)
- Sadao Munemori
- Audie Murphy
- Michael Novosel, Sr.
- Elsie Ott
- John Page
- Emmett Paige, Jr.
- Frank Peregory
- Emily Perez
- Pascal Poolaw
- Colin Powell
- Ralph Puckett
- Matthew Ridgway
- Ruben Rivers
- Roscoe Robinson, Jr.
- Tibor "Ted" Rubin
- James Rudder
- Alejandro Ruiz
- Benjamin Salomon
- Ruppert Sargent
- Paul Smith
- Donn Starry
- Freddie Stowers (Note: Died in combat during World War I)
- Jon Swanson
- Central Texas (Note: Of the nine U.S. Army forts, only Fort Hood is located in the state of Texas)
- Charles Thomas
- Hugh Thompson, Jr.
- Harriet Tubman (Note: Harriet Tubman and Mary Walker were civilians who served the U.S. Army in various capacities during the Civil War that put their lives in danger, such as crossing enemy lines, but at the same time were not allowed to enlist because they were women.)
- Humberto Versace (Note: Executed by Viet Cong while POW during Vietnam War)
- John Vessey, Jr.
- Francis Wai
- Mary Walker
- George Watson
- Homer Wise
- Rodney Yano
- Alvin York
- Charles Young
- Rodger Young

=== List of recommended names ===
On May 24, 2022, the Commission issued its final recommendations:

- Fort Benning had its name recommended to be changed to Fort Moore, and was renamed on May 11, 2023 for Lt. Gen. Hal Moore and his wife Julia Compton Moore. The name was reverted to Fort Benning on March 3, 2025, for Distinguished Service Cross recipient Fred G. Benning instead of Henry Lewis Benning.
- Fort Bragg had its name recommended to be changed to Fort Liberty, and was renamed on June 2, 2023 for the American value of Liberty. (As the only recommendation of a non-person name, this choice attracted both criticism and praise in nearby Fayetteville, North Carolina.) The name was reverted to Fort Bragg on February 10, 2025, for Silver Star recipient Roland L. Bragg instead of Braxton Bragg.
- Fort Gordon was renamed Fort Eisenhower on October 27, 2023, for General of the Army, later US President, Dwight D. Eisenhower. On June 11, 2025 it reverted to Fort Gordon, for Medal of Honor recipient Master Sergeant Gary Gordon instead of John Brown Gordon.
- Fort A.P. Hill was renamed on August 25, 2023, for Medal of Honor recipient Dr. Mary Edwards Walker. On June 11, 2025 it was renamed Fort Anderson-Pinn-Hill, shortened as A.P. Hill, for three different Civil War Medal of Honor recipients: Private Bruce Anderson, First Sergeant Robert A. Pinn, and Lieutenant Colonel Edward Hill instead of Ambrose Powell Hill.
- Fort Hood was renamed on May 9, 2023, for Medal of Honor recipient Gen. Richard E. Cavazos. On June 11, 2025 it reverted to Fort Hood for Distinguished Service Cross recipient Colonel Robert B. Hood instead of John Bell Hood.
- Fort Lee was renamed on April 27, 2023, for Lt. Gen. Arthur J. Gregg and Lt. Col. Charity Adams. On June 11, 2025 it reverted to Fort Lee, this time in honor of Medal of Honor recipient Private Fitz Lee instead of Robert E. Lee.
- Fort Pickett was renamed on March 24, 2023, for Medal of Honor recipient Colonel Van T. Barfoot. On June 13, 2025 it reverted to Fort Pickett, for Distinguished Service Cross recipient First Lieutenant Vernon W. Pickett instead of George Pickett.
- Fort Polk was renamed on June 13, 2023, for Medal of Honor recipient Sgt. William Henry Johnson. On June 11, 2025 it reverted to Fort Polk, this time in honor of General James H. Polk instead of Leonidas Polk.
- Fort Rucker was renamed on April 10, 2023, for Medal of Honor recipient CW4 Michael J. Novosel. On June 11, 2025 it reverted to Fort Rucker, for Distinguished Service Cross recipient Captain Edward Rucker instead of Edmund Rucker.

== Aftermath ==
The recommendations were accepted, and by October 27, 2023, each of the bases had been renamed.

In 2024, Donald Trump made campaign promises to restore the Confederate names to the bases.

On February 10, 2025, in the second month of the second Trump administration, Defense Secretary Pete Hegseth ordered the Army to revert the name of Fort Liberty to Fort Bragg, saying that the base would now be named for Silver Star recipient Roland L. Bragg instead of Braxton Bragg.

On March 3, 2025, Hegseth ordered the Army to revert the name of Fort Benning, saying that the base would now be named for Distinguished Service Cross recipient Fred G. Benning instead of Henry Lewis Benning.

On June 5, 2026, members of the House Armed Services Committee voted 29-27 to force the Department of Defense to use the names assigned by the congressional commission as part of the 2027 National Defense Authorization Act.
