= List of U.S. Army installations named for Confederate soldiers =

Numerous military installations in the United States are or were named after general officers in the Confederate States Army (CSA). These are all U.S. Army or Army National Guard posts, typically named following World War I and during the 1940s. In 2021, the United States Congress created The Naming Commission, a United States government commission, in order to rename federally-owned military assets that have names associated with the CSA. On 5 January 2023 William A. LaPlante, US USD (A&S) directed the full implementation of the recommendations of the Naming Commission, DoD-wide.

In June 2025, the Army announced that all of the bases that were formerly named after Confederate officers will be reverted to their original names, except with new namesakes being used. Defense Secretary Pete Hegseth claimed "that military veterans and active-duty troops urged the Trump administration to rename American military bases,” after what critics called “Confederate traitors who took up arms against the government to defend the enslavement of Black people.” The names for Fort Bragg and Fort Benning were reverted in February and March, respectively. All of the U.S. Army posts were reverted back to their original names by June 2025, reversing the majority of the work done by the Naming Commission, although in each case, the namesake has been a different individual with the same last name, such as Colonel Robert B. Hood.

Senator Jack Reed of Rhode Island opposed the defense secretary’s “cynical maneuver” by writing that "By instead invoking the name of World War II soldier Private Roland Bragg, Secretary Hegseth has not violated the letter of the law, but he has violated its spirit."

Although the individual states are not required to rename their state-owned National Guard facilities, Louisiana and Virginia have chosen to do so. Camp Maxey, Texas, is the only state-owned military facility named after a Confederate officer in 2025.

== History ==
During the world wars, the United States established numerous military bases in former states of the Confederacy that were named after Confederate military figures. Calls to rename the bases occurred sporadically during the 2010s.

In 2015, the Pentagon declared it would not rename any military installations named after Confederate generals, saying "the naming occurred in the spirit of reconciliation, not division", and declined to make further comment when the issue was raised in 2017. Following the June 2020 nationwide protests over the murder of George Floyd by a police officer, Congress began rethinking traditional connections to Confederate Army symbols, including base names. President Donald Trump strongly opposed renaming the bases. Partially due to provisions allowing Confederate-named bases to be renamed, Trump vetoed the 2021 National Defense Authorization Act (NDAA), however, the veto was overridden by a bipartisan vote of Congress.

In 2021, per a provision in the NDAA, Congress created The Naming Commission in order to rename military assets with names associated with the Confederacy. The United States Secretary of Defense was required to implement a plan developed by the commission and to "remove all names, symbols, displays, monuments, and paraphernalia that honor or commemorate the Confederate States of America or any person who served voluntarily with the Confederate States of America from all assets of the Department of Defense" within three years of the commission's creation.

== Active installations ==
There are nine major U.S. military bases that were formerly named in honor of Confederate military leaders, all in former Confederate States. All were renamed in 2023, and subsequently renamed again in 2025 but not for the original people, instead people with the same last name:

- Fort Benning (1917), near Columbus, Georgia, named for Confederate General Henry L. Benning, was redesignated Fort Moore on 11 May 2023 in honor of General Hal Moore and his wife Julia Compton Moore. In March 2025, the base reverted to Fort Benning but with a new namesake, World War I hero Corporal Fred G. Benning.
- Fort Bragg (1918), in North Carolina, named for Confederate General Braxton Bragg, was redesignated Fort Liberty on 2 June 2023 in honor of liberty. In February 2025, the base was again renamed to Fort Bragg, this time for World War II paratrooper Private First Class Roland L. Bragg.
- Fort Gordon (1917), near Augusta, Georgia, named for Confederate General John Brown Gordon, was redesignated Fort Eisenhower on 27 October 2023 in honor of President Dwight D. Eisenhower, the ninth renaming. On June 11, 2025, the base was renamed back to Fort Gordon, after Master Sergeant Gary Gordon, a Medal of Honor recipient who fought in Somalia.
- Fort A.P. Hill (1941), near Bowling Green, Virginia, named for Confederate General A. P. Hill, was redesignated Fort Walker on 25 August 2023 in honor of Medal of Honor recipient and civilian army surgeon Dr. Mary Edwards Walker. On June 11, 2025, the base was renamed after three Civil War Medal of Honor recipients, Private Bruce Anderson, First Sergeant Robert Pinn, and Lieutenant Colonel Edward Hill.
- Fort Hood (1942), in Killeen, Texas, named for Confederate General John Bell Hood, was redesignated Fort Cavazos on 9 May 2023 in honor of Medal of Honor recipient General Richard Cavazos. On June 11, 2025, the base was renamed back to Fort Hood, after World War I hero Colonel Robert B. Hood.
- Fort Lee (1917), in Prince George County, Virginia, named for Confederate General Robert E. Lee, was redesignated Fort Gregg-Adams on 27 April 2023 in honor of Lieutenant General Arthur J. Gregg and Lieutenant Colonel Charity Adams. On June 11, 2025, the base was renamed back to Fort Lee, after Private Fitz Lee, commended for heroism in the Spanish–American War.
- Fort Pickett (1942), near Blackstone, Virginia, a Virginia National Guard installation named for Confederate General George Pickett, was redesignated Fort Barfoot on 24 March 2023 in honor of Medal of Honor recipient Colonel Van T. Barfoot. On June 11, 2025, the base was renamed back to Fort Pickett, after First Lieutenant Vernon W. Pickett, decorated for extraordinary heroism in World War II.
- Fort Polk (1941), near Leesville, Louisiana, named for Episcopal bishop and Confederate General Leonidas Polk, was redesignated Fort Johnson on 13 June 2023 in honor of Medal of Honor recipient Sergeant William Henry Johnson. On June 11, 2025, the base was renamed back to Fort Polk, after General James H. Polk, a World War II officer who later commanded U.S. Army Europe.
- Fort Rucker (1942), in Dale County, Alabama, named for Confederate Colonel Edmund Rucker, was redesignated Fort Novosel on 10 April 2023 in honor of Medal of Honor recipient Chief Warrant Officer 4 Michael J. Novosel. On June 11, 2025, the base was renamed back to Fort Rucker, after World War I aviator Captain Edward W. Rucker.

== Former federal installations that were given to the states ==
The following installations were transferred over to their respective state's National Guard units and are not considered to be assets of the Federal government nor part of The Naming Commission's mandate:

- Camp Beauregard, near Pineville, Louisiana, a Louisiana National Guard installation named for Louisiana native and Confederate General Pierre Gustave Toutant Beauregard. In September 2022, the State of Louisiana started the process of renaming this facility. The installation was redesignated Louisiana National Guard Training Center Pineville in October 2023. The name change was reversed by Republican Governor Jeff Landry in July 2025.
- Camp Maxey, near Paris, Texas, a Texas National Guard installation named after Confederate Brigadier General Samuel B. Maxey. As of 2023, the State of Texas has no plans to rename this facility.
- Camp Pendleton, in Virginia Beach, Virginia, a Virginia National Guard installation named after Confederate Brigadier General William N. Pendleton. In January 2021, Virginia Governor Ralph Northam "directed his administration to review and recommend a replacement name for Camp Pendleton". Northam left office in January 2022 before any change could be implemented. By March 2023, the Virginia National Guard added this statement to the installation's official website: "The Virginia National Guard no longer uses the Camp Pendleton designation and now refers to it only by the original name of the State Military Reservation".

== Deactivated installations ==
Other deactivated mid-20th century installations named for Confederate Generals were:

- Camp Breckinridge, in Kentucky, named for John C. Breckinridge. The former camp has been occupied by the Clements Job Corps Center since 1980.
- Camp Forrest, a large WWII-era training base near Tullahoma, Tennessee named for Nathan Bedford Forrest, now the site of Arnold Air Force Base
- Camp Van Dorn, another massive WWII-era training facility near Centreville, Mississippi named for CSA Maj. Gen. Earl Van Dorn. Except for areas still possessing environmental hazards caused by hazardous munitions, most of the area has been transferred to private ownership.
- Camp Wheeler, in Georgia, named for Joseph Wheeler. The former camp is now occupied by a municipal airport and an industrial park.

== See also ==
- Fort Belvoir, in Fairfax County, Virginia, which was renamed from honoring a Union general to one honoring a slave plantation in 1935 and has also attracted support for potential renaming
- List of name changes due to the George Floyd protests
