= George Walton Academy =

Private school in Monroe, Georgia, United States

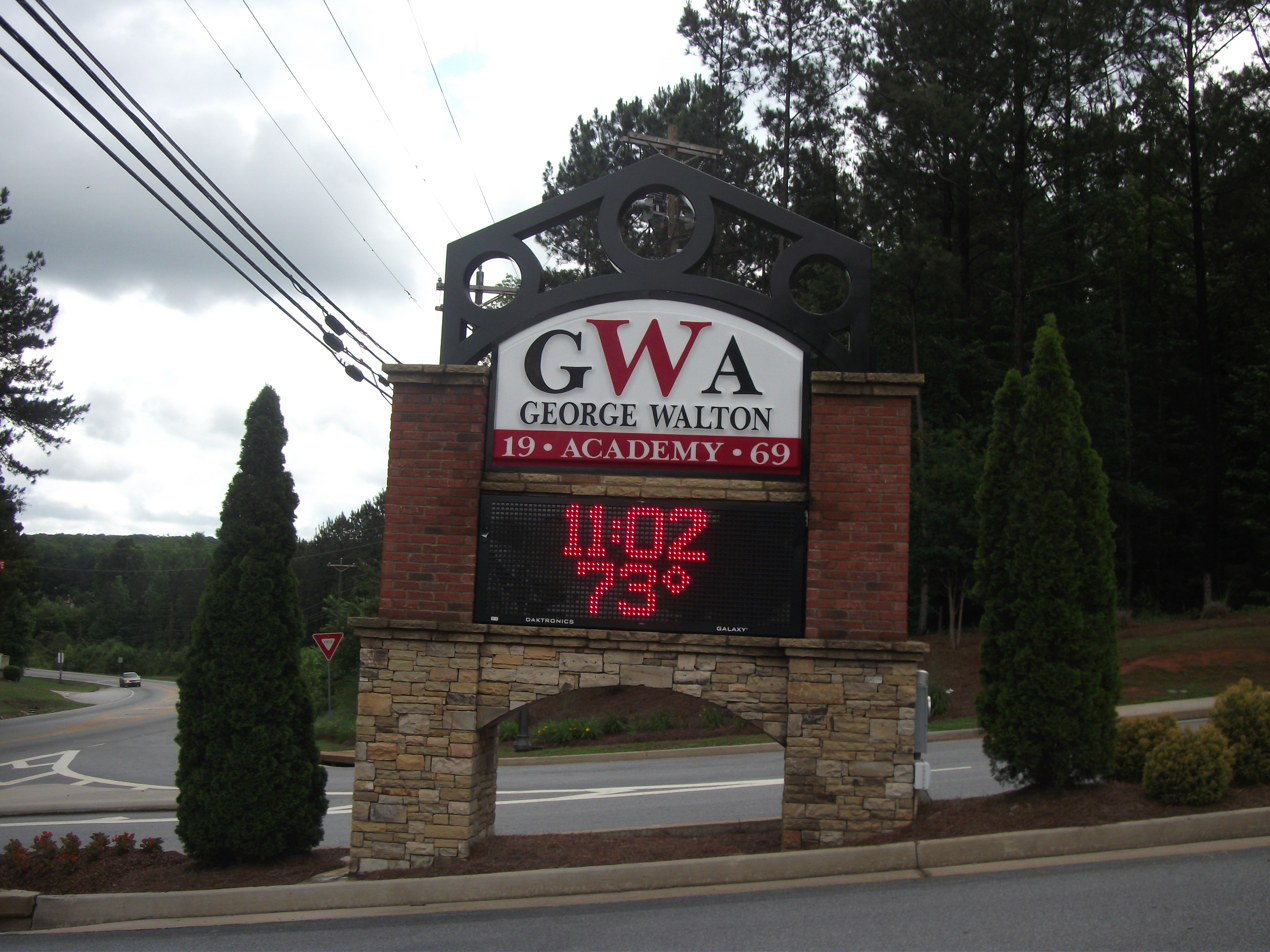
- North entrance to George Walton Academy in 2012

Location
- One Bulldog Drive; Monroe, Georgia 30655; United States; 33°47′24″N 83°44′25″W

Information
- School type: College Preparatory School
- Established: 1969
- Status: Private school
- NCES School ID: 00297281
- Head of school: John Marshall
- Teaching staff: 87.0 (on an FTE basis)
- Age range: 3-18 (preschool–12th grade)
- Enrollment: 762 (790 including preK) (2015–16)
- Student to teacher ratio: 8.8
- Campus: Rural
- Campus size: 60 acres
- Colors: Red, black, and white
- Sports: Currently in the Georgia Independent Athletic Association (GIAA)
- Team name: Bulldogs
- Accreditation: SACS, SAIS, AdvancED
- Newspaper: Bulldog Magazine
- Website: gwa.com

George Walton Academy (GWA) is a K3 (preschool) through twelfth grade private school in Monroe, Georgia. It was established in 1969 as a segregation academy in response to school integration in the United States. It is now a college preparatory school.

== History ==
George Walton Academy was founded in 1969 during school desegregation in Good Hope, Georgia. It is now located in Monroe, Georgia, and serves PK-12th grades with a student-teacher ratio of 10:1. According to General Ty Seidule, an alumnus, the school was founded for one purpose: "Ensure white kids didn't have to go to school with Black kids." Initially, the school was located in Good Hope, Georgia, where the school took over the facilities of two public schools, the previously all-white Good Hope School and the previously all-black Good Hope-Peters School. In 1975, the school moved from Good Hope to Monroe.

As of 1983, several black children had been accepted for admission, but none had enrolled.

As of 1991, George Walton Academy was accredited by the Georgia Accrediting Commission, but not Southern Association of Colleges and Schools, which was considered the legitimate accrediting association for the state.

In 2010, George Walton Academy withdrew from the Georgia Independent School Association, which consists largely of former segregation academies, and started to compete alongside public schools in the Georgia High School Association athletic league. They would later return to the GISA (in the sector of GIAA) and continue athletics there.

In 2017, the school's global studies program was launched and includes educational study opportunities in Belize, France, the Galapagos Islands and Spain. Students have the chance to conduct field work alongside medical students from Johns Hopkins University in Belize.

In 2020, more than $4 million was pledged for the GWA "Go Beyond" campaign to expand and enhance the athletic and arts facilities on campus. The school was also awarded a School Empowerment Grant by Walton EMC to expand the high school physics program and lower school STEM program.

In 2021, George Walton's board decided to fire headmaster Dan Dolan after four years of service. The board later replaced him with Gary Hobbs, the temporary head of school. In 2023, a new head of school, John Marshall, was instated

== Accreditation ==
The academy is accredited by the Georgia Accrediting Commission, Southern Association of Independent Schools and the Southern Association of Colleges and Schools. The academy is a member of the Georgia Independent School Association and the Georgia High School Association.

== Fine arts ==
Visual and performing arts classes are offered during the school day as well as enrichment opportunities after school in the form of co-curricular activities and student clubs. Advanced Placement classes are available in both music and the visual arts. Offerings include marching band, symphonic winds, concert ensemble, percussion, theater, chorus, visual arts, dance, photography, sculpture studio, yearbook.

== Athletics ==
GWA was a member of the Georgia High School Association (GHSA), Region 8, Class A division.

In 2020 the school forfeited 6 football games because of rules violations involving paying players. The team was fined $1,000 per violation, and the coach was fired. In November, 2021, GWA returned to the Georgia Independent Athletic Association (GIAA).

GWA's athletics programs won GISA championships in football (1979, 1991, 2003, and 2009) boys basketball (1975 and 1984), girls basketball (2023), boys lacrosse (2023), and girls lacrosse (2023). Sports include baseball, basketball, cheerleading, cross country, football, golf, lacrosse, majorettes, softball, swimming, equestrian, soccer, tennis, track, volleyball, and wrestling.

== Notable alumni ==
- Kyle Chandler, actor (Friday Night Lights and Super 8)
- Ty Seidule, brigadier general, author
- John Clarence Stewart, actor and singer

== Demographics ==
As of the 2018 school year, the students included 8 Asian, 34 Black, 8 Hispanic, 670 White, and 10 of two or more races.
