= Fort A.P. Hill =

Installation of the US Army near Bowling Green, VA

Fort A.P. Hill Regional Training Center
- Caroline County, Virginia

Site information
- Type: Military base
- Controlled by: United States Army
- Website: home.army.mil/aphill/

Location
- Location of Fort A.P. Hill Fort A.P. Hill Regional Training Center (the United States)
- Coordinates: 38°07′04″N 77°16′35″W

Site history
- Built: 11 June 1941
- In use: 1941—present

Garrison information
- Current commander: Lt. Col. Matthew S. Bauer
- Past commanders: Lieutenant Colonel Andrew Q. Jordan; Lieutenant Colonel David A. Meyer; Lieutenant Colonel Peter E. Dargle; Lieutenant Colonel John W. Haefner; Lieutenant Colonel Michael S. Graese; Lieutenant Colonel James M. Mis; Lieutenant Colonel James B. Balocki; Lieutenant Colonel Michael E. Gates; Lieutenant Colonel Andrew P. Aswell; Lieutenant Colonel Jason P. Duffy

Fort Anderson-Pinn-Hill, commonly and originally known as Fort A.P. Hill (briefly Fort Walker) is a training and maneuver center belonging to the United States Army located near the town of Bowling Green, Virginia. The center focuses on arms training and is used by all branches of the U.S. Armed Forces, independent of any post.

As such, the units being trained will coordinate with Fort A.P. Hill's Installation Safety Office, the Directorate of Plans, Training, Mobilization, and Security, the Regional Training Support Center, Fort A.P. Hill's Plans, Analysis and Integration Office, the Directorate of Public Works, and the Directorate of Resource Management.

A Post Exchange and Commissary are a 60-mile drive away, at Fort Belvoir; online purchases can be trans-shipped to Fort A.P. Hill.

C-17s and C-130s can land at the Fort A.P. Hill Airstrip. There is a jump zone, and drop zone.

== History ==
In the spring of 1940, the War Plans Division of the Army General Staff developed a plan to raise a national army of four million men that would allow it to conduct simultaneous operations in both the Pacific and European theaters. In July 1940, a movement began to locate an area of approximately 60,000 acres (240 km^{2}), independent of any post, and lying somewhere between the Potomac River and the upper Chesapeake Bay.

Lieutenant Colonel Oliver Marston, an artillery officer stationed in Richmond, Virginia and acting as an agent of the Third Corps Area commander, made a detailed investigation of the Bowling Green, Virginia area in September 1940. He enthusiastically recommended that the War Department procure the Caroline County site. The result was a maneuver area that contained 77,332 acres (312.95 km^{2}) and billeting space for 74 officers and 858 enlisted personnel.

The installation was established as an army training facility on 11 June 1941, pursuant to War Department General Order No. 5. In its first year, the installation was used as a maneuver area for the II Corps and for three activated National Guard divisions from the Mid-Atlantic states. In the autumn of 1942, Fort A.P. Hill was the staging area for the headquarters and corps troops of Major General George S. Patton’s Task Force A, which was part of the Western Task Force of the Allied invasion of French North Africa. During the early years of World War II, the post continued to be a training site for corps and division-sized units. Commencing in 1944, field training for Officer Candidate School and enlisted replacements from nearby Forts Lee, Eustis, and Belvoir was conducted.

In 1952, during the Korean War, the installation was designated as Camp A.P. Hill and was a major staging area for units deploying to Europe, including the VII Corps Headquarters and the 3rd Armored Cavalry Regiment. The fort was the major center for the Engineer Officer Candidate School, training students from Fort Belvoir during the Vietnam War.

Construction of the U.S. Army Ordnance Corps Explosive Ordnance Disposal training center was completed in July 2011, with the first day of class being 17 October 2011. It is named after Captain Jason McMahon, who died in Afghanistan in 2010. The center provides explosive ordnance disposal advanced technical training and tactical skills education for both officer and enlisted.

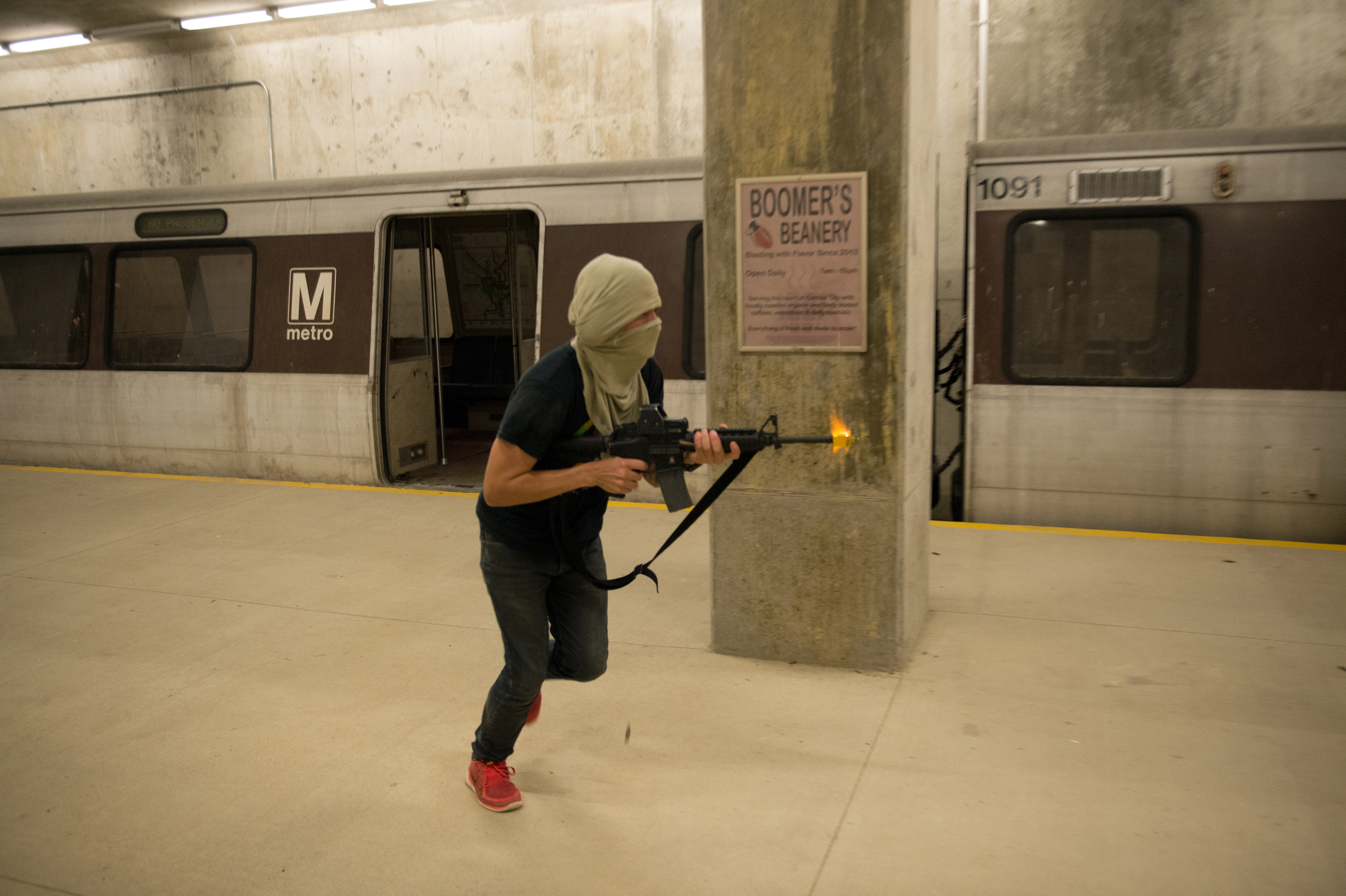
Replica Washington Metro station

The U.S. Army Asymmetric Warfare Group officially opened its $90.1 million Asymmetric Warfare Training Center on 24 January 2014. The 300-acre (120 ha) training complex includes a headquarters, barracks, administrative, training and maintenance facilities, an urban training area, a 12-mile (19 km) mobility range, an 800-metre (2,600 ft) known distance range, a light demolitions range and an indoor shooting range. This center focuses on providing joint and combined arms training. All branches of the U.S. Armed Forces train at the installation, and the installation has also hosted training of foreign allies, ranging from providing support for mobilizations to helping units train for deployment.

=== Redesignation ===
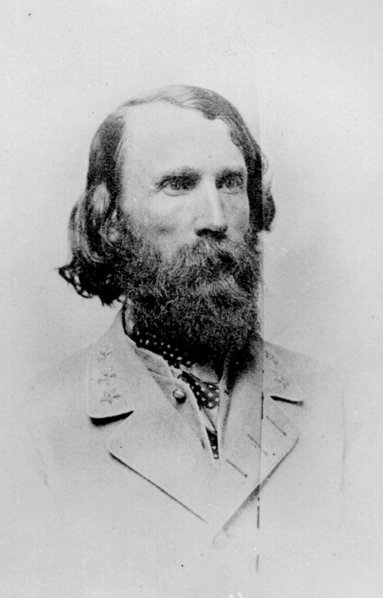
General A. P. Hill, after whom the fort was formerly named

The installation was named for Virginia native and Confederate Lieutenant General A. P. Hill. Fort A.P. Hill was one of the U.S. Army installations named for Confederate soldiers to be recommended for renaming by the Naming Commission. Their recommendation was that the post be renamed Fort Walker, after American abolitionist and Civil War surgeon Mary Edwards Walker. On 5 January 2023, William A. LaPlante, the US under-secretary of defense for acquisition and sustainment, directed the full implementation of the recommendations of the Naming Commission, DoD-wide. The post was redesignated Fort Walker on 25 August 2023.

In June 2025 it was announced that Fort Walker would be renamed to Fort Anderson-Pinn-Hill, shortened as A.P. Hill, to honor three different Civil War soldiers who fought for the Union: Private Bruce Anderson, First Sergeant Robert A. Pinn, and Lieutenant Colonel Edward Hill.

Bruce Anderson	Robert A. Pinn	Edward Hill
No photo available		

=== Collaborative Anti-Mine and Robotic Breaching Exercise ===
On 12 June 2024 the U.S. Army Combat Capabilities Development Command (CCDC) C5ISR demonstrated anti-mine capabilities during a robotic breaching exercise at Fort Walker.

== Organization ==
The Fort A.P. Hill garrison currently includes;

- Directorate of Emergency Services
- Directorate of Family and MWR
- Directorate of Plans, Training, Mobilization, and Security
- Regional Training Support Center
- Plans, Analysis and Integration Office
- Directorate of Public Works
- Directorate of Resource Management
- Installation Safety Office
- Sustainable Range Program

== Training ==
Soldiers participate in a road march at the fort in 2013.

It is used year-round for military training of both active and reserve troops of the U.S. Army, U.S. Navy, U.S. Marine Corps, and U.S. Air Force, as well as Reserve Officers' Training Corps cadets and other government agencies including the Departments of State and Interior, U.S. Customs and Border Protection, and federal, state, and local security and law enforcement agencies.

== Boy Scouts of America National Jamborees ==
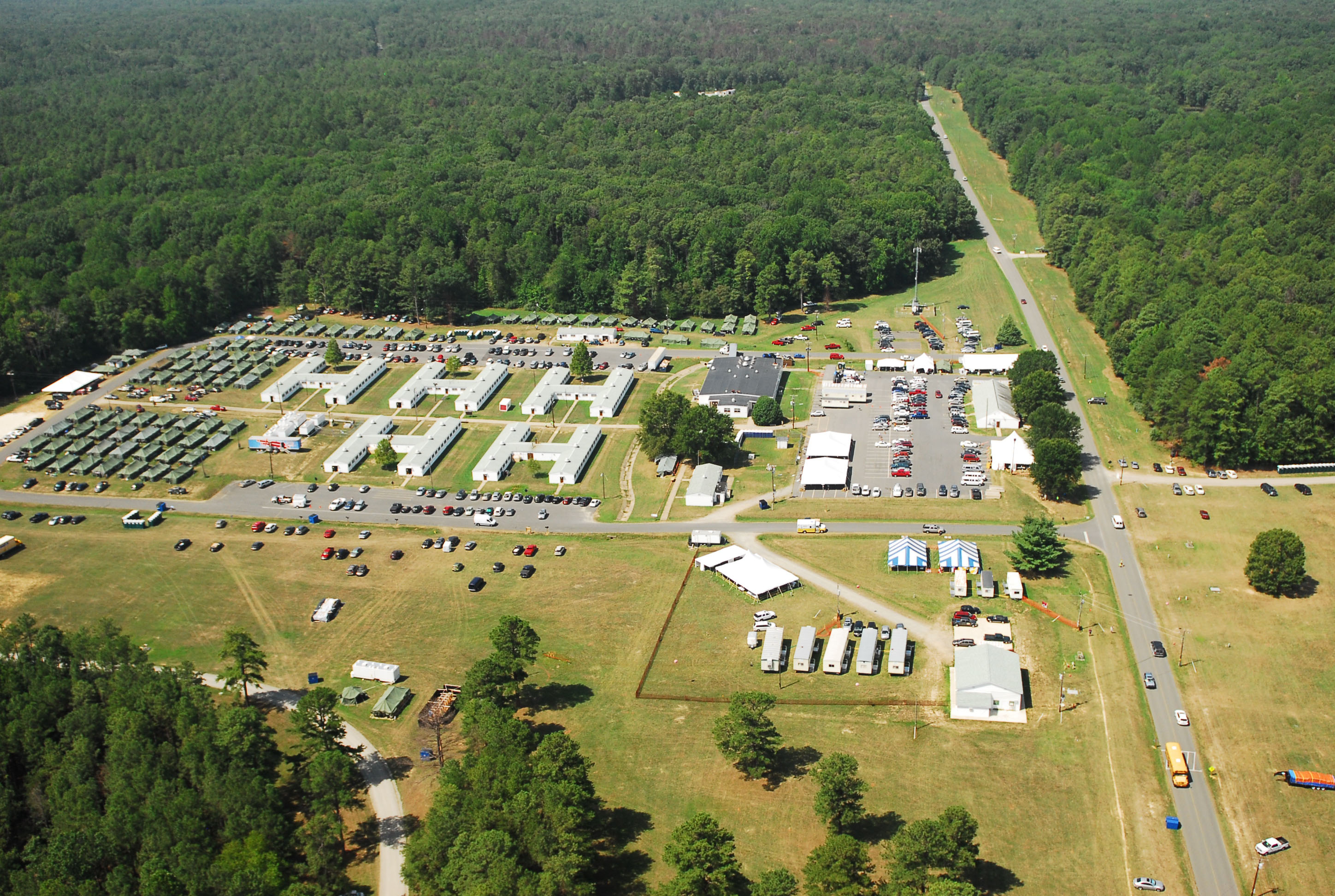
Fort A.P Hill during 2010 Boy Scout Jamboree

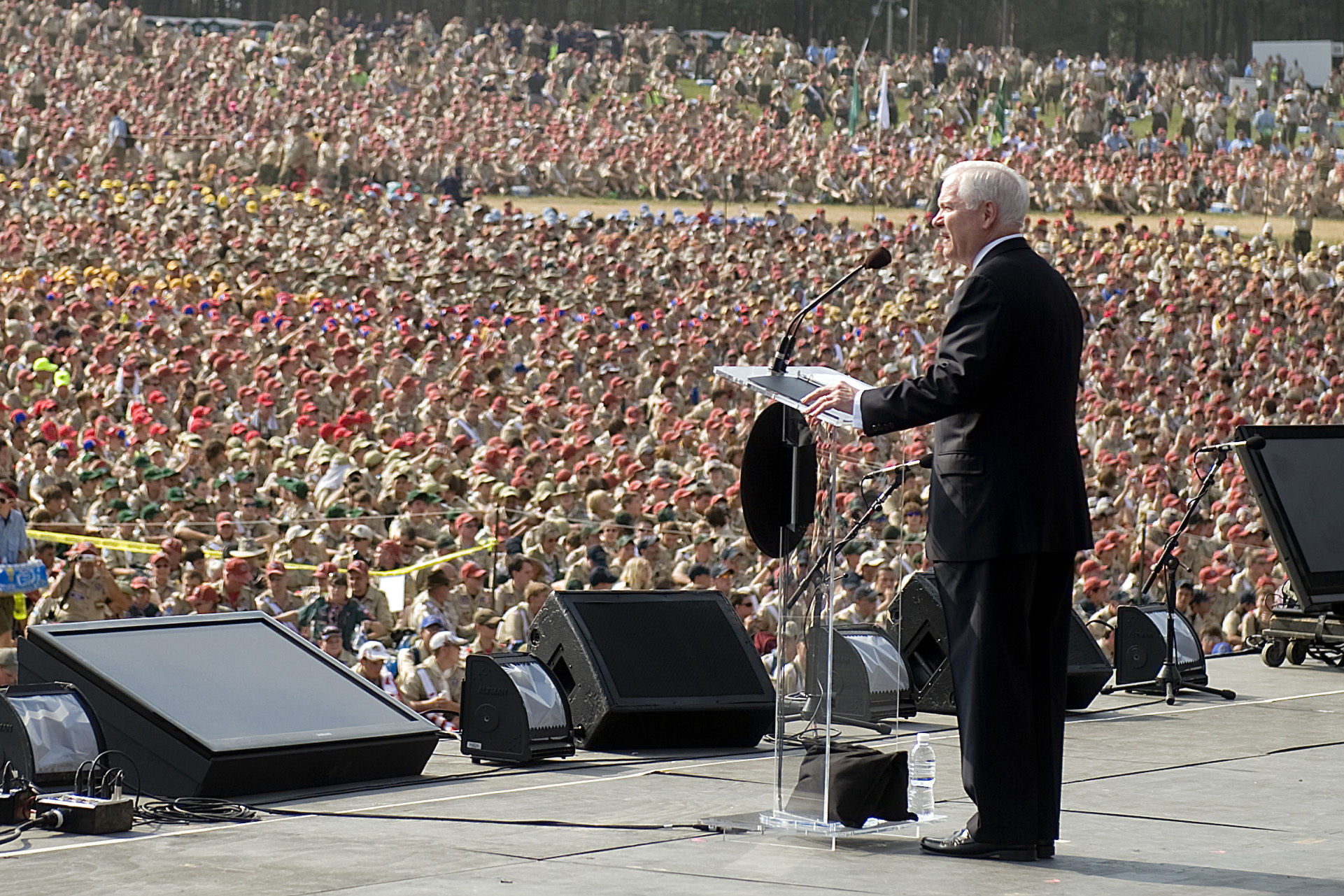
Secretary of Defense Robert Gates addresses the 2010 National Scout Jamboree at the fort

The installation hosted the Boy Scouts of America National Scout Jamboree in 1981, 1985, 1989, 1993, 1997, 2001, 2005, and 2010. The number of participants each time included approximately 35,000 Boy Scouts and some 250,000 visitors. In 2013, the Boy Scouts moved the Jamboree to its new permanent home at Summit Bechtel Reserve high adventure camp in Fayette County, West Virginia.

== In the media ==
An episode of What on Earth?, first shown on Discovery Channel as S8 E1 (8/27/20), features the site in an episode called "Zombietown USA".
