= Ty Seidule =

American historian and former army officer

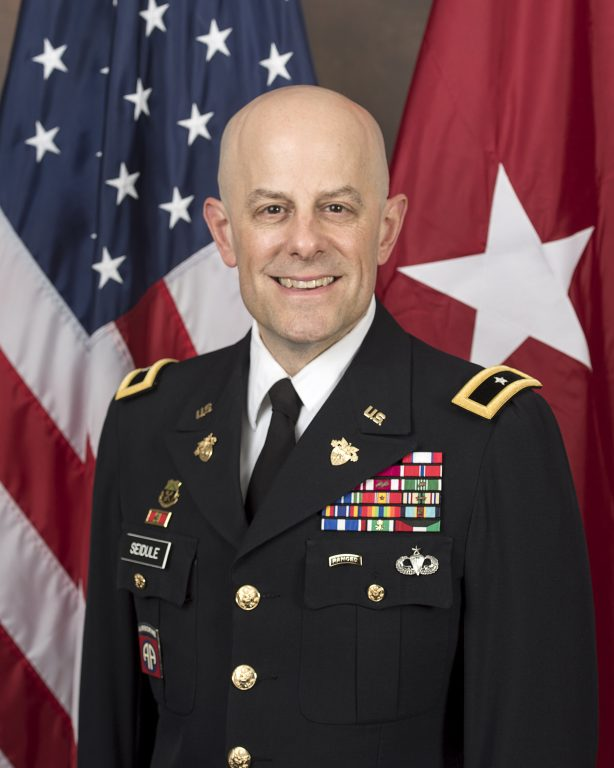
- Born: James Tyrus Seidule; July 3, 1962 (age 64); Alexandria, Virginia, US

Academic background
- Education: Washington and Lee University; Ohio State University
- Thesis: Morale in the American Expeditionary Forces During World War I (1997)
- Doctoral advisor: Allan R. Millett

Academic work
- Discipline: History
- Sub-discipline: American military history
- Institutions: United States Military Academy; Hamilton College
- Main interests: Robert E. Lee; military history of the American Civil War; racial relations in the US military
- Military career
- Branch: United States Army
- Service years: c. 1984 –2020
- Rank: Brigadier general

James Tyrus Seidule (born 1962) is a retired United States Army brigadier general, the former head of the history department at the United States Military Academy, the first professor emeritus of history at West Point, and the inaugural Joshua Chamberlain Fellow at Hamilton College. Seidule is also the Presidential Advisor to The National WWII Museum in New Orleans and a fellow at New America. In February 2021, Defense Secretary Lloyd Austin appointed Seidule as one of four representatives of the US Department of Defense to the Commission on the Naming of Items of the Department of Defense that Commemorate the Confederate States of America or Any Person Who Served Voluntarily with the Confederate States of America, including US Army installations named for Confederate soldiers.

== Early life and later career ==
Ty Seidule was born in Alexandria, Virginia, on July 3, 1962. He was raised just blocks away from the home of Confederate States Army commander Robert E. Lee, a fact that would later play a prominent role in his academic career. He also attended Robert E. Lee Elementary School (which later became the Nannie J. Lee Memorial Recreation Center, named after a prominent African-American resident, after the school was closed in 1978 and the property transferred to the city parks department) in Alexandria, and later earned a Bachelor of Arts degree from Washington and Lee University in 1984. He later obtained an MA in 1994 and PhD in 1997 in history from Ohio State University. While still teaching at the military academy, Seidule continued to work on his doctoral degree in Ohio State graduate program under the direction of professor Allan R. Millett.

Upon completion of the college ROTC program at Washington and Lee University in 1984, Seidule became an officer in the United States Army. Seidule served for 36 years, starting as a tank platoon leader in Germany. His commands include a cavalry unit in the 82nd Airborne Division during the Gulf War, as well as 3rd Battalion, 81st Armor Regiment. His staff positions included crisis planning for NATO in Kosovo and North Macedonia.

After receiving his master's degree in history from Ohio State University in 1994, Seidule was appointed an assistant professor of history at the United States Military Academy while remaining on active duty in the army. Seidule retired from the military academy and the US Army as a brigadier general in 2020.

In 2020, Seidule was appointed the Chamberlain Fellow and visiting professor of history at Hamilton College. He is also a fellow in the International Security program at New America. He is a professor emeritus of history at the United States Military Academy at West Point, where he taught and was the head of the history department for two decades during his time as an officer in the US Army.

In May 2021, Seidule was awarded an honorary doctorate and was the commencement speaker at Hamilton College.

== Publications ==
- "'Treason is Treason:' Civil War Memory at West Point". The Journal of Military History. 76 (2): 427–452. April 2012. EBSCOhost 73944469.
- Rogers, Clifford J.; Seidule, Ty; Watson, Samuel J., eds. (2014), The West Point History of the Civil War, The West Point History of Warfare Series, vol. 1, Simon and Schuster, ISBN 978-1476782621
- The West Point History of Warfare, editors Clifford J. Rogers and Ty Seidule, four volumes, 71-chapter enhanced e-book (New York: Rowan Technology Solutions, 2015).
- Seidule, Ty; Whitt, Jacqueline E., eds. (2015), Stand Up and Fight! The Creation of U.S. Security Organizations, 1942-2005, US Army War College Press
- Rogers, Clifford J.; Seidule, Ty; Stapleton, John M. Jr., eds. (2016), The West Point History of Warfare: Medieval, The West Point History of Warfare Series, Rowan Technologies Solutions
- Rogers, Clifford J.; Seidule, Ty; Waddell, Steve R., eds. (2016), The West Point History of World War II, Vol. 2, The West Point History of Warfare Series, vol. 3, Simon and Schuster, ISBN 978-1476782775
- Seidule, Ty (2017), "From Slavery to Black Power: Racial Intolerance at West Point, 1778-2014", in Tully, Robert; Chilton, Bruce (eds.), Intolerance: Political Animals and Their Prey, New York: Hamilton Books, ISBN 978-0761869153
- Rogers, Clifford J.; Seidule, Ty; Watson, Samuel J., eds. (2017), The West Point History of the American Revolution, The West Point History of Warfare Series, vol. 4, Simon and Schuster, ISBN 978-1476782751
- "Black Power Cadets: How African American Students Defeated President Nixon's Confederate Monument and Changed West Point, 1971-1976", Hudson River Valley Review, 36 (1): 55–82, Autumn 2019
- Robert E. Lee and Me: A Southerner's Reckoning with the Myth of the Lost Cause, New York: St. Martin's Press, 2021, ISBN 978-1250239266
