= Mildred Kelly =

United States Army non-commissioned officer (1928–2003)

- Born: Mildred Catherine Kelly; January 24, 1928; Chattanooga, Tennessee, US
- Died: January 27, 2003 (aged 75)
- Burial place: Arlington National Cemetery
- Education: Knoxville College
- Military career
- Branch: United States Army
- Service years: 1950–1976
- Rank: Command Sergeant Major

Mildred Catherine Kelly (January 24, 1928 – January 27, 2003) served in the United States Army from March 1947 to April 1976. She became the first African-American woman to hold the rank of sergeant major and command sergeant major in the US Army and became the first female command sergeant major of a predominantly male Army installation.

== Life and service ==
Born in Chattanooga, Tennessee, Kelly graduated from Knoxville College with a bachelor's degree in chemistry in 1949. She taught high school for only one year before enlisting in the Women's Army Corps in 1950 and serving for 26 years. She rose through the ranks to become the first black female sergeant major in the Army while serving at the Pentagon in 1972. In 1974, she became the first female command sergeant major of an Army installation (the Aberdeen Proving Ground in Maryland) with a predominantly male base population. Kelly retired from the army on April 1, 1976.

Kelly went on to serve on various boards and commissions, including the Women in Military Service for America Memorial Foundation, the Maryland Veterans Commission, the Veterans Advisory Board, and the National Association of Black Military Women. She was president of Chapter 16 of the Women's Army Corps Veterans Association. She contributed to the campaign to erect the Women in Military Service for America Memorial at the ceremonial entrance to Arlington National Cemetery.

Kelly died of cancer on January 27, 2003. She was buried with full military honors in Section 67 of Arlington National Cemetery. In 2022, the Naming Commission placed Kelly on its shortlist of potential new names for nine Army installations named in commemoration of the Confederacy. Ultimately, her name was not used.
