= Edward Hill (Medal of Honor) =

American Civil War Medal of Honor recipient

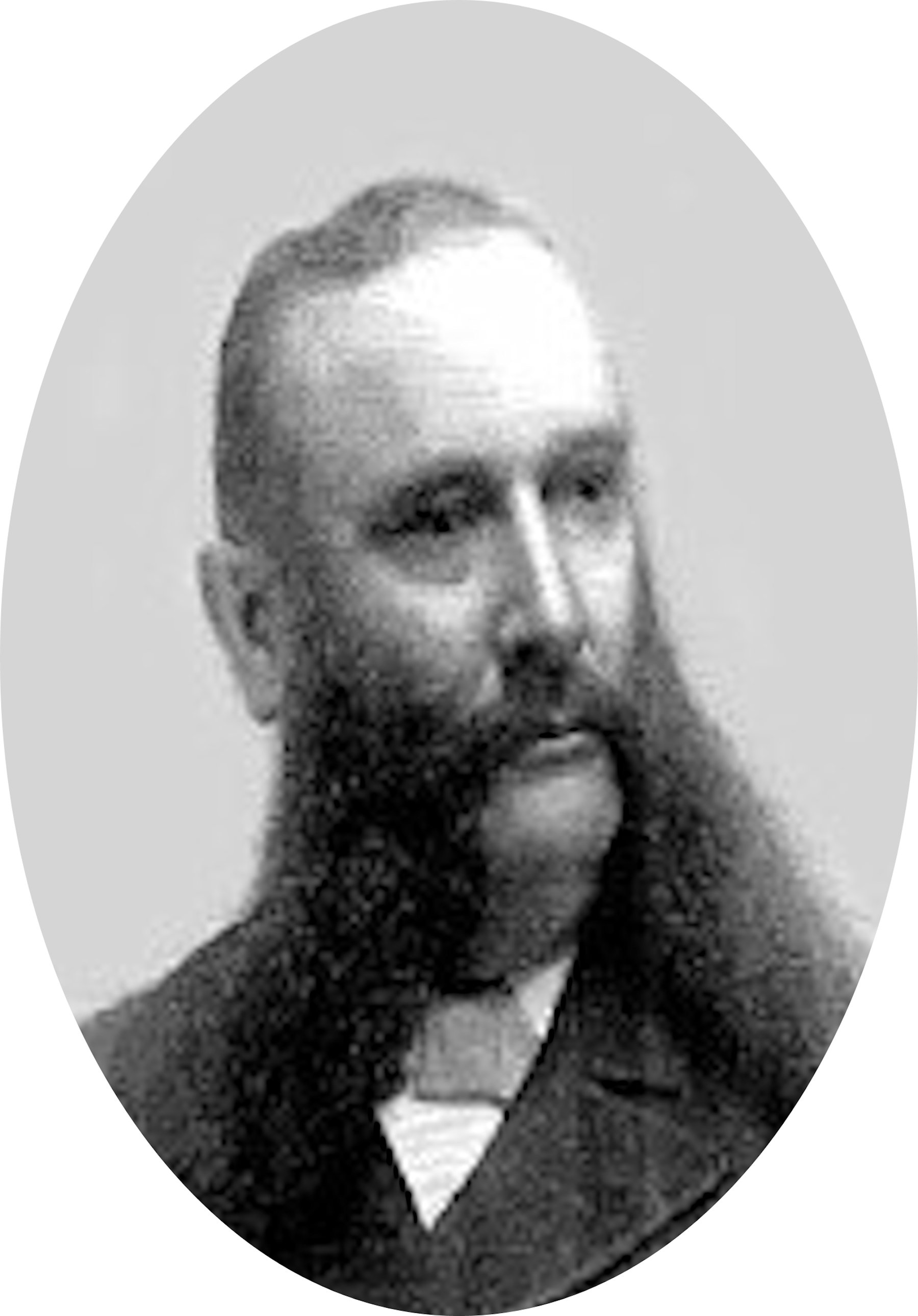
- Born: April 13, 1835; Liberty, New York, US
- Died: October 23, 1900 (aged 65)
- Burial place: Fredericksburg National Cemetery; Fredericksburg, Virginia, US
- Military career
- Allegiance: United States of America; Union
- Branch: United States Army; Union Army
- Rank: Lieutenant colonel
- Units: Company K, 16th Michigan Infantry
- Conflicts: American Civil War
- Awards: Medal of Honor

Edward Hill (April 13, 1835 – October 23, 1900) was an officer in the United States Army during the American Civil War. He received the Medal of Honor.

He is one of three namesakes of Fort A.P. Hill, an Army installation in Bowling Green, Virginia, alongside First Sergeant Robert Pinn, and Private Bruce Anderson, having originally named after Confederate lieutenant general A. P. Hill and later renamed after Mary Edwards Walker.

== Biography ==
Hill was born on April 13, 1835, in Liberty, New York.

On June 1, 1864, as the Captain of Company K, 16th Michigan Infantry during the Battle of Cold Harbor, Hill "led the brigade skirmish line in a desperate charge on the enemy's masked batteries to the muzzles of the guns, where he was severely wounded."

Hill survived and rose to the rank of lieutenant colonel. He was awarded the Medal of Honor on December 4, 1893.

Hill died on October 23, 1900, and was buried in Fredericksburg National Cemetery, in Fredericksburg, Virginia. His grave can be located in Section OS, Grave 2.

== Medal of Honor citation ==
Rank and organization: Captain, Company K, 1 6th Michigan Infantry. Place and date: At Cold Harbor, Va., June 1, 1864. Entered service at: Detroit, Mich. Birth: Liberty, N.Y. Date of issue: December 4, 1893.

Citation:

Led the brigade skirmish line in a desperate charge on the enemy's masked batteries to the muzzles of the guns, where he was severely wounded.

== See also ==
- List of Medal of Honor recipients
- List of American Civil War Medal of Honor recipients: G–L
