= Bruce Anderson (soldier) =

American Union Army soldier (1845–1922)

- Born: June 19, 1845; Mexico (Note: 1910 Census lists Anderson and his parent as born in Mexico, the country with immigration to the US in 1855.)
- Died: August 22, 1922 (aged 77); Albany, New York, US
- Burial place: Green Hill Cemetery; Amsterdam, New York, US
- Military career
- Allegiance: United States of America; Union
- Branch: United States Army; Union Army
- Service years: 1864 - 1865
- Rank: Private
- Units: Company K, 142nd Regiment New York Volunteer Infantry
- Conflicts: American Civil War; Second Battle of Fort Fisher
- Awards: Medal of Honor

Bruce Anderson (June 19, 1845 – August 22, 1922) was an African American Union Army soldier in the American Civil War and a recipient of America's highest military decoration, the Medal of Honor, for his actions during the Second Battle of Fort Fisher.

After working as a farmer in New York, Anderson joined the military to fight in the Civil War. He volunteered with a group of other soldiers to dismantle a palisade blocking his unit's advance. After completing the mission and destroying the palisade, Anderson and twelve others were recommended for the Medal of Honor, but the paperwork was lost. Anderson hired an attorney to get the Medal, and he and two other soldiers received it in 1914.

He is one of three namesakes of Fort A.P. Hill, an Army installation in Bowling Green, Virginia, alongside Lieutenant Colonel Edward Hill and First Sergeant Robert Pinn, having originally named after Confederate lieutenant general A. P. Hill and later renamed after Mary Edwards Walker.

== Biography ==
Anderson was born June 19, 1845, in Mexico City but by the beginning of the Civil War was working as a farmer in New York. He enlisted for service in the military from Schenectady (Note: Anderson's Medal of Honor citation incorrectly records his place of enlistment as Ephratah, New York.) on August 31, 1864, as a private in Company K, 142nd New York Volunteer Infantry. Anderson has the unusual, but not unique, distinction of being an African American soldier who served in a white Civil War regiment.

On January 15, 1865, Anderson participated in the Union's second attack on Fort Fisher in North Carolina. He and twelve other men answered a call for volunteers to advance of the main attack and cut down the palisade which blocked their path. Despite intense fire from the Confederate defenders, Anderson and the others were successful in destroying the obstacle. General Adelbert Ames recommended all thirteen men for the Medal of Honor, but his report was misplaced, and not all of the medals were issued.

Forty-nine years after the end of the war, in 1914, Anderson hired a lawyer in an effort to receive the Medal of Honor. One of the other soldiers in the palisade-cutting group, Private Zachariah C. Neahr, had successfully petitioned for the award decades earlier. At Anderson's prompting, the Adjutant General of the Army launched an investigation that uncovered General Ames' letter of recommendation and sought out the other men of the group. Three men, Alaric B. Chapin, George Merrill, and Dewitt C. Hotchkiss, were found to be still alive and were, along with Anderson, again recommended for the medal. Anderson, Merrill, and Chapin were each issued the Medal of Honor on December 28, 1914; Hotchkiss' recommendation was overlooked a second time, and he was never decorated.

Anderson lived for a time in Illinois, but eventually returned to New York and settled there in the city of Amsterdam. He died August 22, 1922, at age 77 in St. Peter's Hospital in Albany, New York, and was buried at Green Hill Cemetery in Amsterdam.

== Medal of Honor citation ==
The President of the United States of America, in the name of Congress, takes pleasure in presenting the Medal of Honor to Private Bruce Anderson, United States Army, for extraordinary heroism on 15 January 1865, while serving with Company K, 142d New York Infantry, in action at Fort Fisher, North Carolina. Private Anderson voluntarily advanced with the head of the column and cut down the palisading.

General Orders: Date of Issue: December 28, 1914

Action Date: January 15, 1865

Service: Army

Rank: Private

Company: Company K

Regiment: 142nd New York Infantry

== See also ==
- List of Medal of Honor recipients
- List of American Civil War Medal of Honor recipients: A–F
- List of Medal of Honor recipients for the Second Battle of Fort Fisher
- List of African-American Medal of Honor recipients
