= Fred G. Benning =

U.S. Army soldier (1900–1974)

- Benning while mayor of Neligh, Nebraska

Mayor of Neligh, Nebraska
- In office April 22, 1948 – April 29, 1952
- Preceded by: Elven A. Butterfield
- Succeeded by: Walter Bradley

Personal details
- Born: January 12, 1900 Norfolk, Nebraska, U.S.
- Died: May 17, 1974 (aged 74) Neligh, Nebraska, U.S.
- Resting place: New Lutheran Cemetery; Norfolk, Nebraska, U.S.
- Spouse: Florence M. Reiter
- Children: 2
- Awards: Distinguished Service Cross; World War I Victory Medal; Croix de Guerre

Military service
- Allegiance: United States
- Branch/service: United States Army
- Rank: Corporal
- Unit: Machine Gun Company, 16th Infantry Regiment, 1st Division
- Battles/wars: Meuse–Argonne offensive (World War I)

Fred G. Benning (January 12, 1900 – May 17, 1974) was a United States Army soldier during World War I, businessman, and public servant. For his heroic actions while deployed in France with the American Expeditionary Forces, Benning was awarded the Distinguished Service Cross by President Woodrow Wilson. Later in life, Benning served two terms as mayor of Neligh, Nebraska. Since 2025, Benning has been the new namesake of Fort Benning, a U.S. military base near Columbus, Georgia.

== Early life and family ==
Benning was born on January 12, 1900, in Norfolk, Nebraska, where he was raised, and attended Norfolk's public schools. His parents were both immigrants from Germany, and he was a first-generation American.

Benning was married to Florence M. Reiter in 1926, and they had two daughters, one of whom died in infancy.

== Military service ==
Benning entered the Army on April 18, 1917 and served with a machine gun company of the 1st Division of the American Expeditionary Forces in Germany and France, with the rank of corporal. Benning was cited for his heroism on October 9, 1918, near Exermont, France, during the Meuse–Argonne offensive, when he took command of his platoon after his commander was killed and the senior noncommissioned officers were disabled. Under heavy fire, he led his unit of twenty men to their assigned position.

== Later life ==
After returning home from the war, Benning settled in Neligh, Nebraska, where he entered the baking trade. He opened the Neligh Bakery (later marketed as "Benning's Bakery") in 1926, which he operated until his retirement in 1965.

Benning was active in community affairs, including volunteering with the Masonic Lodge and Veterans of Foreign Wars, serving as a member of the Antelope County Committee on Jurors, and serving as president of the Neligh Chamber of Commerce. In 1946, he helped organize fundraising activities for the Neligh Memorial Hospital fund.

In 1940 Benning was elected commander of American Legion post No. 172, a role he held for seventeen years. Benning delivered speeches to World War II draftees and assisted in home front efforts during the war. Despite registering for the draft, he was not called to serve during the war.

=== Public service ===
In 1945, Benning was appointed to the State of Nebraska Veterans Loan Certifying Committee.

In April 1948, Benning was elected Mayor of Neligh with 66 percent of the vote, and sworn in on April 22, 1948. In 1949, Benning accidentally discharged a firearm and shot a city councilman. At the request of a night watchman, he was examining a .38 caliber revolver for defects, unaware that the gun was loaded after he had examined it a few minutes prior. The councilman received a minor wound in the finger, and was otherwise unharmed.

Benning was reelected without opposition in 1950. Benning also served on the local Disaster Relief Committee which coordinated with the Red Cross to serve 1,200 families during snowbound emergencies in the severe winter storms of 1948. In 1950, Benning led the implementation of a new modern switchboard and phone system in the city. In 1951, he presided over the creation and establishment of Street Improvement Districts within the city.

Benning did not seek reelection in 1952. Benning's time in office was referred to as a "turbulent period," with his main notable accomplishments being utility improvements, disaster relief, and a city-wide repaving project. In the 1950s and 1960s, Benning served on the local Retail Trade Committee and County Veterans Service Committee.

In 1973 Benning was co-chair of the Neligh centennial celebrations.

==== Freeman v. City of Neligh ====
In 1952 the lawsuit Freeman v. City of Neligh sought to prevent Benning and the city from proceeding with street improvement projects, arguing that the ordinance authorizing them was invalid due to procedural and constitutional issues. The Nebraska Supreme Court ruled in favor of Benning and the city, upholding the ordinance and rejecting claims of improper procedure.

== Death ==
Benning died on May 17, 1974, at age 74. He is interred at New Lutheran Cemetery in Norfolk.

== Awards and honors ==
Benning's military awards include the World War I Victory Medal, the Croix de Guerre, and the Distinguished Service Cross. Benning received his Distinguished Service Cross via U.S. mail, as he declined to have it presented to him in a ceremony with military honors.

=== Distinguished Service Cross citation ===

Benning, Fred G.
Corporal, U.S. Army
16th Infantry Regiment, 1st Division, American Expeditionary Forces
Date of Action: October 9, 1918

Citation: The President of the United States of America, authorized by Act of Congress, takes pleasure in presenting the Distinguished Service Cross to Corporal Fred G. Benning (ASN: 45097), United States Army, for extraordinary heroism in action while serving with Machine-Gun Company, 16th Infantry Regiment, 1st Division, American Expeditionary Forces, south of Exermont, France, 9 October 1918. After his platoon commander had been killed and two senior noncommissioned officers disabled, Corporal Benning took command of the platoon and, by his able leadership and courage, conducted it through heavy fire to its assigned position on Hill 240.

=== Fort Benning ===
Fort Benning was originally named for Confederate general Henry L. Benning, until it was renamed to Fort Moore in 2023, due to an act of Congress that prohibited naming federal installations after Confederate officials. Benning's name was one of thousands submitted by the public before the naming commission's decision to rename Fort Benning to Fort Moore.

In March 2025 U.S. Secretary of Defense Pete Hegseth issued a memorandum restoring the name "Fort Benning" to the facility, this time honoring Corporal Benning rather than the base's original namesake.
