= Elsie Ott =

United States Army officer

Elise Ott
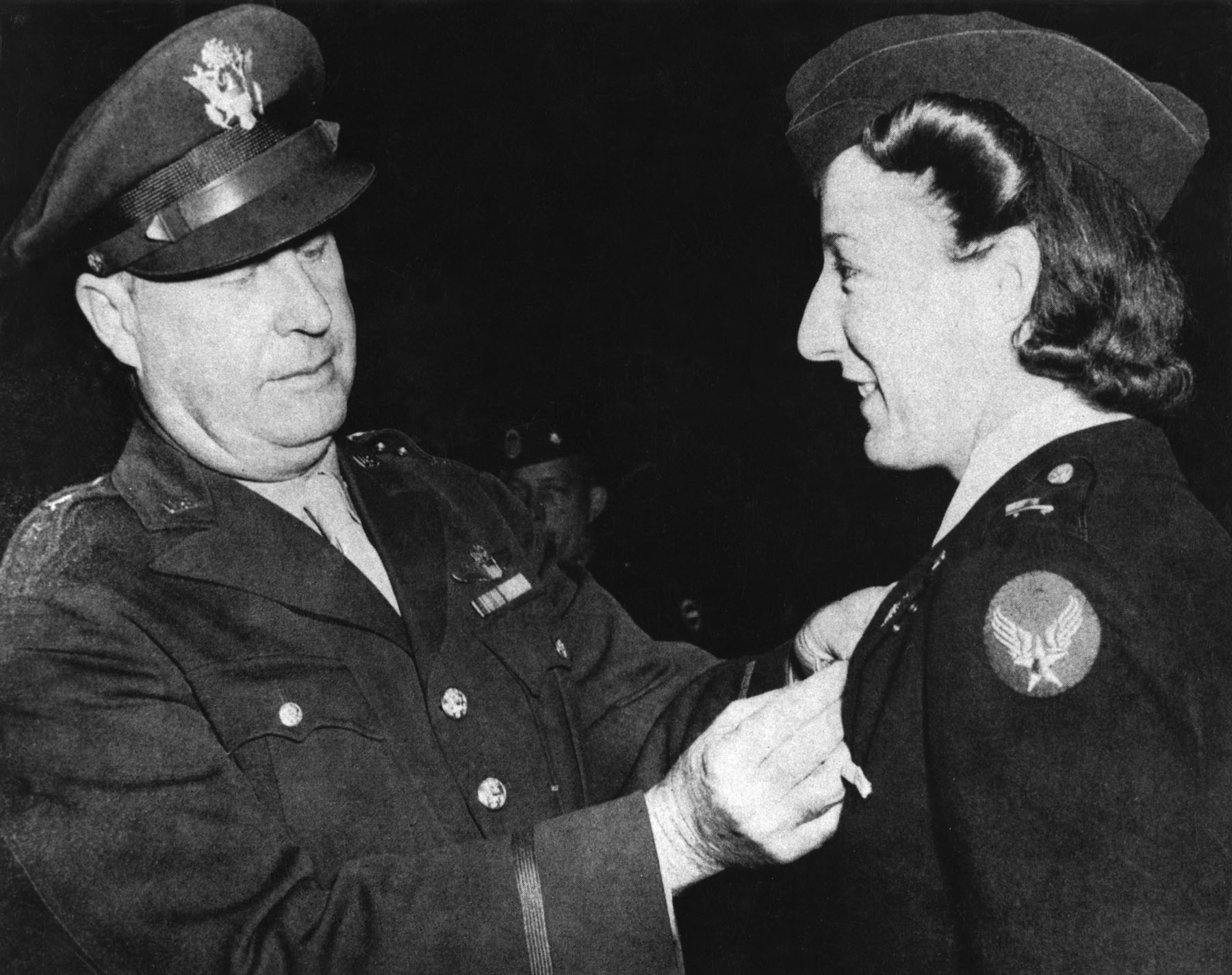
- Brig. Gen. Fred S. Borum presents the United States Air Medal to Lt. Elsie Ott (1943)
- Born: 1913; Smithtown, New York
- Died: 2006 (aged 92–93)
- Occupations: Nurse; Air Force Officer (Rank of Second Lieutenant)

Second Lieutenant Elsie Ott (1913–2006) was the first woman to receive the United States Air Medal. She was awarded this medal in recognition of her heroism in determining a way to evacuate the wounded from the front line.

Elsie S. Ott was born in 1913 in Smithtown, New York. After completing high school Ott attended the Lenox Hill Hospital School of Nursing in New York City. She worked various positions at several different hospitals before she joined the Army Nurse Corps in September 1941. Given the position of second lieutenant soon after entering the corps, Ott immediately went on assignments in Louisiana and Virginia before making the long journey to Karachi, India.

In India, Ott would be a part of the first ever intercontinental air evacuation. She was assigned the flight with only 24 hours notice, had zero air-evacuation training, and had never flown in a plane before. On January 17, 1943, Ott served as an in-flight nurse for five soldiers during a week-long venture — a trip that previously could only have been accomplished by ship and would have taken three months. The flight was a success, and Ott helped transport wounded soldiers from Karachi all the way to the Walter Reed Hospital in Washington D.C.

Knowing that her log of how she handled the flight would be important, Ott made sure to take careful notes. She listed things that would have been of benefit and suggested them for future evacuations. Among the things that Ott recommended for subsequent trips were: more bandages, extra blankets and oxygen.

Two months after her flight, Ott was awarded the first Air Medal presented to a woman.

Later, Ott was promoted to captain. She was discharged in 1946. Twenty years later, she was called back to debut the C-9 Nightingale, the new air ambulance for the Vietnam War.

== See also ==
- Flight nurse
- Medical evacuation
- McDonnell Douglas C-9
