= Robert Pinn =

United States Army Medal of Honor recipient (1843–1911)

Robert Alexander Pinn
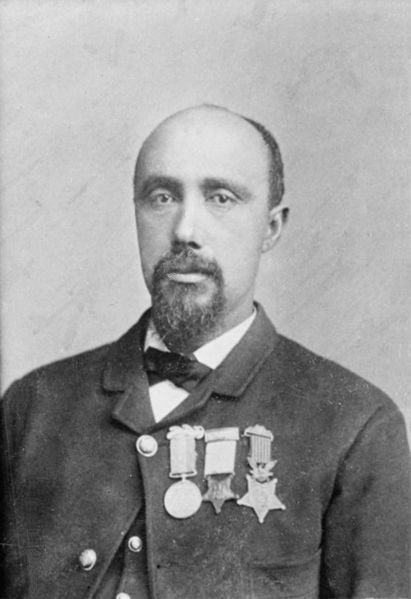
- First Sergeant Robert Pinn
- Born: March 1, 1843; Perry Township, Stark County, Ohio, U.S.
- Died: January 5, 1911 (aged 67)
- Burial place: Massillon City Cemetery; Massillon, Ohio, U.S.
- Military career
- Allegiance: United States of America; Union
- Branch: United States Army; Union Army
- Service years: 1863-1865
- Rank: First sergeant
- Unit: 5th U.S. Colored Infantry Regiment
- Conflicts: American Civil War; Battle of Shiloh; Battle of Chaffin's Farm (WIA); Battle of Fort Harrison
- Awards: Medal of Honor

Signature
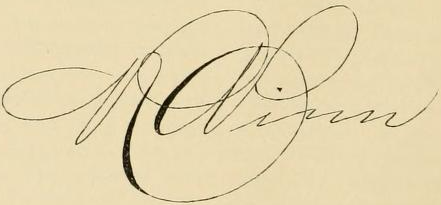

Robert Alexander Pinn (March 1, 1843 – January 5, 1911) was an African American Union Army soldier during the American Civil War and a recipient of America's highest military decoration—the Medal of Honor—for his actions at the Battle of Chaffin's Farm.

== Early life ==
Robert A. Pinn was born on March 1, 1843, in Perry Township, Stark County, Ohio, to Zilphia (née Broxon) and William Pinn. His father was from Fauquier County, Virginia, and was born a slave. His mother was of English ancestry and was born in Mercer County, Pennsylvania. His father worked as a farmer and blacksmith. Pinn grew up on the family farm and at the age of 11 started to learn the trade of broom manufacturer.

== Career ==
=== Military service ===
In 1861, Pinn joined the 19th Ohio Infantry Regiment as a civilian worker under Major Surgeon Hurxthal during the Civil War, but did not enlist since black troops were not allowed to enlist. He was at the Battle of Shiloh in April 1862. He then enlisted in June 1863 and joined Company I of the 5th U.S. Colored Infantry Regiment, also called the 127th Ohio. He was appointed sergeant on October 18, 1863, and later as first sergeant on February 29, 1864. He marched from Norfolk, Virginia, and fought guerilla forces in southern Virginia and North Carolina. He was also at the battles of Chaffin's Farm and New Market Heights and Fort Harrison. He was wounded on September 29, 1864, while leading his company against the enemy's works known as Fort Gilmer south of Richmond during the Battle of Chaffin's Farm. He was wounded three times: once in the left thigh, the left leg and the right shoulder. The wound to his shoulder left his arm disabled. He received the Medal of Honor for his service at the Battle of Chaffin's Farm. He was awarded the Medal of Honor six months later, on April 6, 1865. He was discharged from service on September 20, 1865, in Carolina City and returned to Stark County.

=== Medal of Honor citation ===

Rank and Organization:

First Sergeant, Company I, 5th U.S. Colored Troops. Place and date: At Chaffin's Farm, Va., September 29, 1864. Entered service at: Massillon, Ohio. Born: March 1, 1843, Stark County, Ohio. Date of issue: April 6, 1865.

Citation:

Took command of his company after all the officers had been killed or wounded and gallantly led it in battle.

=== Later career ===
After returning to Ohio, Pinn worked in teaming and contracting until the spring of 1874. He then sold his business and studied at Oberlin Academy from 1874 to 1876 and Oberlin College from 1876 to 1877. He read law with Professor Thomas. He also attended law school in South Carolina. He served as principal of Cairo High School and taught school in Illinois and South Carolina. He finished studying law with R. H. Folger in Massillon. He was admitted to the bar in 1879 and started to practice law. He was a pensions and claims agent for the U.S. Pension Bureau. He was the first black attorney in Stark County.

Pinn was a Republican. He served as a delegate at the state convention that nominated William McKinley as governor. He ran for justice of the peace of Perry Township in 1901. He was a member of the Grand Army of the Republic (G.A.R.). He was elected as commander of the Hart Post No. 134 in 1886 and was elected as junior vice commander of the Ohio department of the G.A.R. in 1888

== Personal life ==
Pinn married Emily J. Manzilla of Mahoning County in 1867. They had a daughter, Grace R. (died 1938). His wife died in 1890. He owned eighty acres in Tuscarawas Township and had a home at 96 Akron Street in Massillon. He could speak German fluently.

Pinn died in 1911, at age 67, and was buried in Massillon City Cemetery in Massillon.

== Legacy ==
In 1973, the Ohio National Guard named its new armory in Stow, Ohio, in his honor. It was the first armory in Ohio named after a black soldier.

In 1998, the shooting facility at the University of Akron was renamed the Robert A. Pinn Shooting Range in his honor. The range, used by the university's ROTC component and NCAA rifle team, is one of the premier shooting facilities in the state of Ohio.

He is one of three namesakes of Fort A.P. Hill, an Army installation in Bowling Green, Virginia, alongside Lieutenant Colonel Edward Hill and Private Bruce Anderson, having originally named after Confederate lieutenant general A. P. Hill and later renamed after Mary Edwards Walker.

== See also ==
- List of Medal of Honor recipients
- List of American Civil War Medal of Honor recipients: M–P
- List of African American Medal of Honor recipients
- Melvin Claxton and Mark Puls, Uncommon valor : a story of race, patriotism, and glory in the final battles of the Civil War, (Wiley, 2006) (ISBN 0471468231)
