= Vernon W. Pickett =

American military officer (1912–1944)

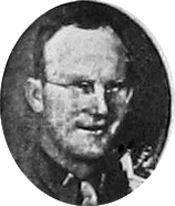
- Born: August 12, 1912; Pineville, Louisiana, U.S.
- Died: September 14, 1944 (aged 32); Azelot, Vichy France
- Burial place: Alexandria National Cemetery
- Alma mater: Louisiana College
- Spouse: Louise Maddox
- Military career
- Allegiance: United States of America
- Branch: United States Army
- Service years: 1941–1944
- Rank: First lieutenant
- Units: 137th Infantry Regiment; 35th Infantry Division
- Conflicts: World War II (POW) (WIA)
- Awards: Purple Heart Medal; Distinguished Service Cross; Prisoner of War Medal

Vernon W. Pickett (August 12, 1912 – September 14, 1944) was a United States Army officer during World War II. He was decorated with the Distinguished Service Cross for escaping from a prisoner of war camp. He is the current namesake of Fort Pickett.

== Early life ==
Vernon W. Pickett was born on August 12, 1912, in Pineville, Louisiana, to C. E. Pickett. He graduated from Bolton High School in 1930. He attended Louisiana College for four years.

== Military career ==
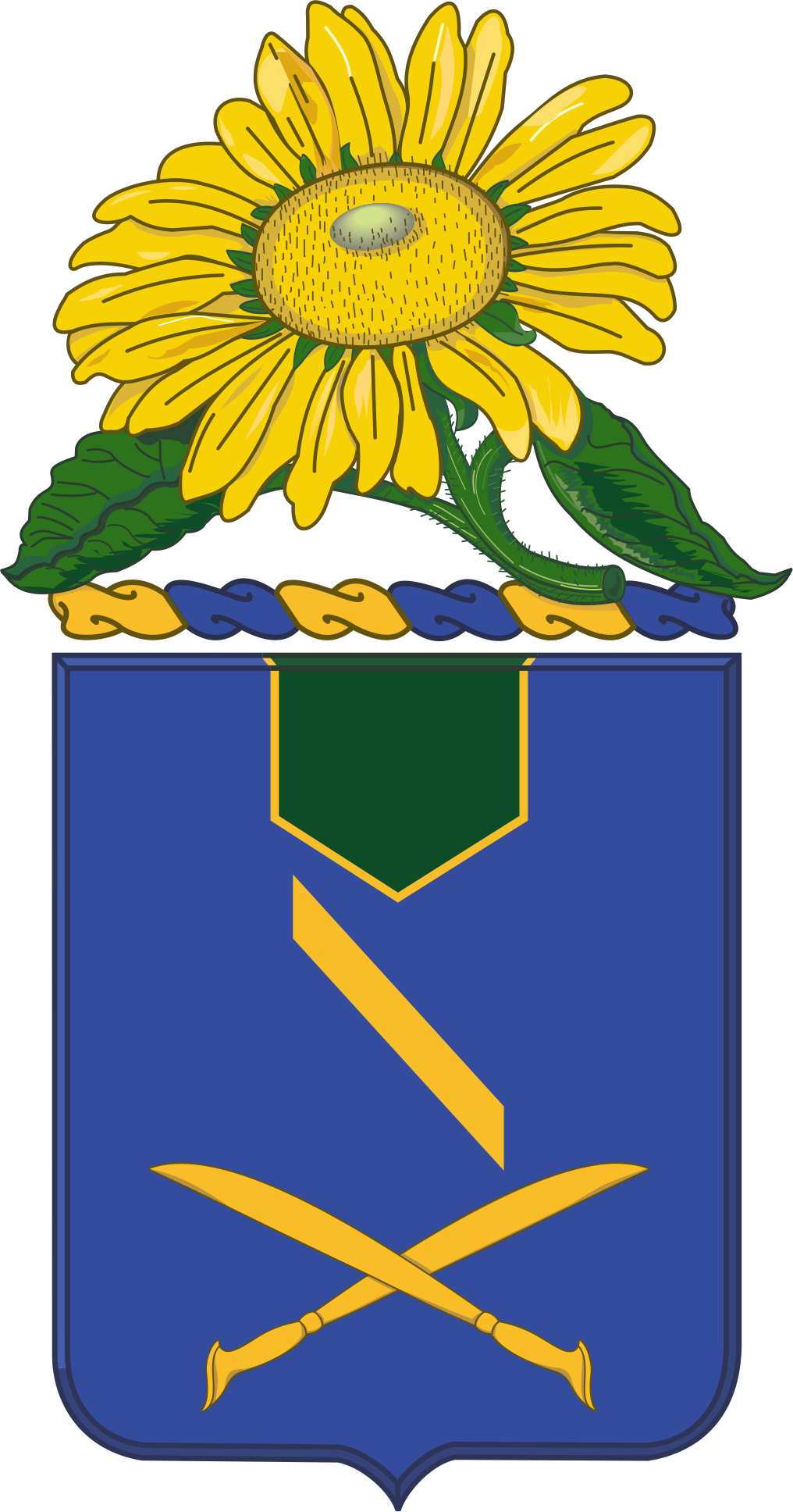
137th Infantry Regiment DUI

Pickett was a member of the National Guard. He worked for Hemenway-Johnson Furniture Company. He joined the Army in June 1941 and attended officer's school in 1942. He was assigned to Headquarters Company, 3rd Battalion, 137th Infantry Regiment. In April 1944, he was promoted to first lieutenant. The regiment went first to England and then on to Normandy, France on June 8, 1944 as part of the 35th Infantry Division. The regiment was sent right into the fight. On July 15, Pickett was wounded and captured by the enemy near Saint-Lô, France while leading a communications team to set up a forward observations post. His team came under heavy machine gun fire and had to retreat during the night. He single handedly destroyed several machine gun nests with grenades in the early morning hours but was wounded and knocked unconscious. He was taken to Frontstammlager 221 (Front Stalag 221) a prisoner of war camp near Rennes, France. On August 3, he and 300 other prisoners were being moved in boxcars from the prison and on the night of August 5, they were able to cut the wire holding the boxcar door shut and escaped. After returning to allied lines on August 12, Pickett returned to his unit. He was killed in action on September 14, 1944, in France. For his actions on July 15, 1944, Pickett was posthumously awarded the Distinguished Service Cross on November 12, 1944. He was also awarded the Prisoner of War Medal.

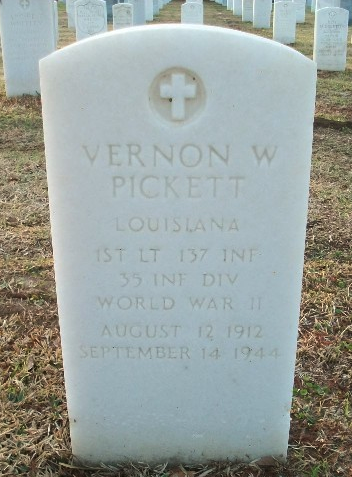
1st Lieutenant Vernon W. Pickett

Pickett married Louise Maddox. He is buried at Alexandria National Cemetery near Pineville, Louisiana.

== Legacy ==
Fort Barfoot in Virginia was renamed back to Fort Pickett in June 2025 after Vernon Pickett. The fort had previously been named for Colonel Van T. Barfoot, a World War II Medal of Honor recipient, from 2023 to 2025. It was previously named Camp Pickett (later Fort Pickett) after Confederate General George Edward Pickett, who commanded a division under General Robert E. Lee at the Battle of Gettysburg. The Camp was dedicated on July 3, 1942, to commemorate Pickett's Charge 79 years earlier against the federal position at Gettysburg.
