= Robert B. Hood =

U.S. Army colonel (1891–1964)

Robert Benjamin Hood
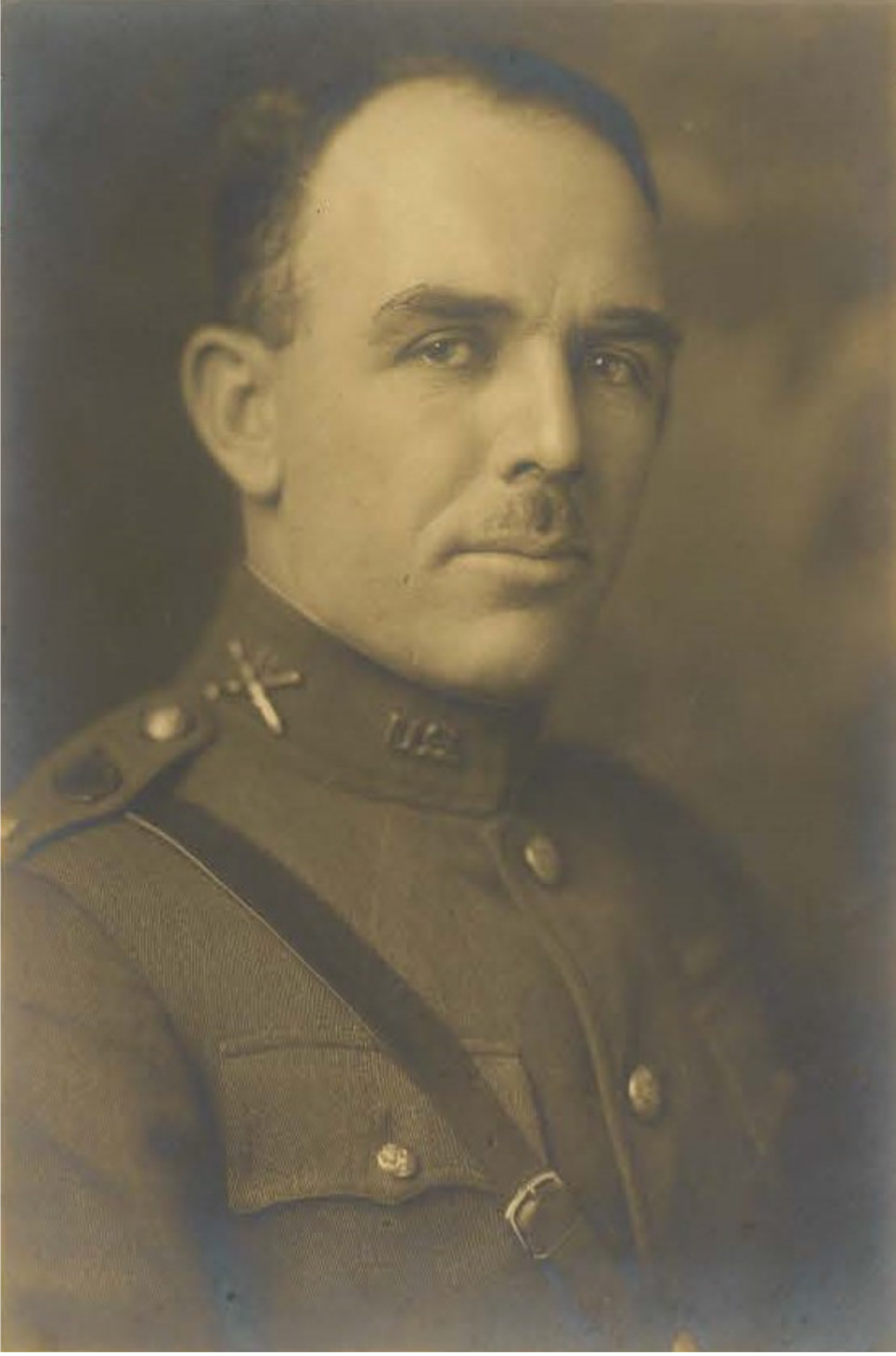
- Born: 8 April 1891; Wellington, Kansas, U.S.
- Died: 12 October 1964 (aged 73); Jasper County Missouri, U.S.
- Relatives: Hazel McMinn (wife); Mary Louise Hood (daughter); Margaret Jane Williams (daughter)
- Military career
- Allegiance: United States
- Branch: United States Army
- Service years: 1917–1961
- Rank: Colonel
- Unit: 12th Field Artillery Regiment
- Conflicts: World War I World War II
- Awards: Distinguished Service Cross

Robert B. Hood (April 8, 1891 – October 12, 1964) was a United States Army officer.

== Early life and education ==
Hood was born in Wellington, Kansas on April 8, 1891, and graduated from Kansas State Agricultural College (now Kansas State University) with a horticulture degree in 1914.

== Career ==
Hood was commissioned into the Army on August 8, 1917, as a lieutenant and was sent with his unit, Battery E, 12th Field Artillery Regiment, 2nd Infantry Division to France. On September 12, 1918, Captain Hood directed his battery while under direct fire near Thiaucourt, France. The citation for his Distinguished Service Cross reads, "Captain Hood brought the battery into action under fire, superintended the placing of the guns and the unloading of the ammunition, and directed the fire of the battery under an intense enfilading fire. When the entire gun crew of his first piece was wiped out, he hastily formed a supplementary gun squad and succeeded in getting the first piece into action again within four minutes."

In 1919, Hood commanded the regiment's supply company as they returned to the United States.

After the war, he remained in the Army and married Hazel McMinn and had two daughters Mary Louise and Margaret Jane.

As a major, Hood was stationed at Schofield Barracks, Hawaii on December 7, 1941, and he and his family survived the Pearl Harbor attack. During World War II, Lt. Colonel Hood commanded an artillery training unit at Fort Sill, Oklahoma. He retired as a "full-bird" colonel in 1961.

Hood died on Oct. 12, 1964 in Jasper County, Missouri.

== Namesake ==
In June 2025, Fort Cavazos (named for Medal of Honor recipient General Richard E. Cavazos) was renamed back to Fort Hood after Colonel Robert Hood. The Fort had previously been named both Camp Hood and Fort Hood after Confederate general John Bell Hood.
