= Mary Edwards Walker =

American feminist and doctor (1832–1919)

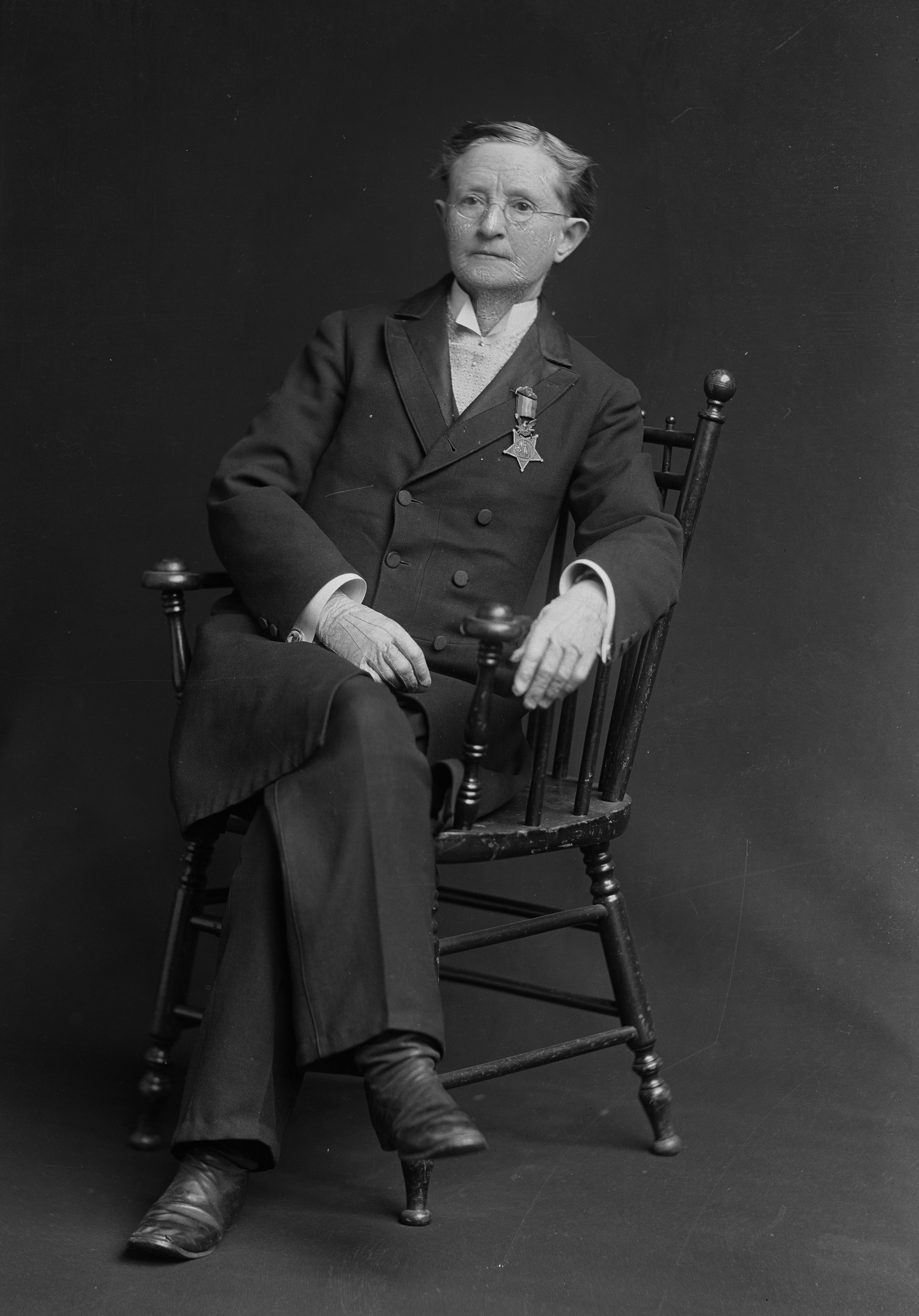
- Walker with her Medal of Honor, photographed by C. M. Bell
- Born: November 26, 1832; Oswego, New York, U.S.
- Died: February 21, 1919 (aged 86); Oswego, New York, U.S.
- Resting place: Rural cemetery, Oswego
- Education: Falley Seminary (1850–1852); Syracuse Medical College (1853–1855); Hygeio-Therapeutic College (1862)
- Occupation: Surgeon
- Employer: United States Army
- Known for: Receiving the Medal of Honor during the American Civil War, was the first female U.S. Army surgeon, prohibitionist, abolitionist, first and only female Medal of Honor recipient
- Spouse: Albert Miller (m. 1855; div. 1869)
- Awards: Medal of Honor

Mary Edwards Walker (November 26, 1832 – February 21, 1919), commonly referred to as Dr. Mary Walker, was an American abolitionist, prohibitionist, prisoner of war in the American Civil War, and surgeon. She is the only woman to receive the Medal of Honor.

In 1855, she earned her medical degree at Syracuse Medical College in New York, married and started a medical practice. She attempted to join the Union Army at the outbreak of the Civil War, but was turned away. She served as a surgeon at a temporary hospital in Washington, D.C. before being hired by Union Forces and assigned to Army of the Cumberland and later the 52nd Ohio Infantry, becoming the first female surgeon in the US Army. She was captured by Confederate forces after crossing enemy lines to treat wounded civilians and arrested as a spy. She was sent as a prisoner of war to Richmond, Virginia, until released in a prisoner exchange.

After the war, she was approved for the Medal of Honor, for her efforts to treat the wounded in battle and across enemy lines during the Civil War. Notably, the award was not expressly given for gallantry in action at that time, and in fact was the only military decoration during the Civil War. Walker is the only woman to receive the medal and one of only eight civilians to receive it. Her name was deleted from the Army Medal of Honor Roll in 1917 (along with over 900 other recipients); however, it was restored in 1977.

After the war, she was a writer and lecturer supporting the women's suffrage movement until her death in 1919.

== Early life and education ==
Mary Edwards Walker was born in the Town of Oswego, New York, on November 26, 1832, the daughter of Alvah (father) and Vesta (mother) Walker. She had four older sisters and one younger brother. Alvah and Vesta raised both their son and their daughters in a progressive manner that was revolutionary for the time. Their nontraditional parenting nurtured Mary's spirit of independence and sense of justice that she actively demonstrated throughout her life. While they were devoted Christians, the Walkers were Freethinkers who raised their children to question the regulations and restrictions of various denominations. The Walker parents also demonstrated non-traditional gender roles to their children regarding sharing work around the farm: Vesta often participated in heavy labor while Alvah took part in general household chores. Walker worked on her family farm as a child. She did not wear women's clothing during farm labor because she considered it too restricting. Her mother reinforced her views that corsets and tight lacings were unhealthy.

Her elementary education consisted of attendance at the local school that her parents had started. The Walkers were determined that their daughters be as well-educated as their son, so they founded the first free schoolhouse in Oswego in the late 1830s. After finishing primary school, Mary and two of her older sisters attended Falley Seminary in Fulton, New York. Falley was not only an institution of higher learning, but a place that emphasized modern social reform in gender roles, education, and hygiene. Its ideologies and practices further cemented Mary's determination to defy traditional feminine standards on a principle of injustice. In her free time, Mary would pore over her father's medical texts on anatomy and physiology; her interest in medicine is attributable to her exposure to medical literature at an early age. As a young woman, she taught at a school in Minetto, New York, eventually earning enough money to pay her way through Syracuse Medical College, where she graduated with honors as a medical doctor in 1855, the only woman in her class.

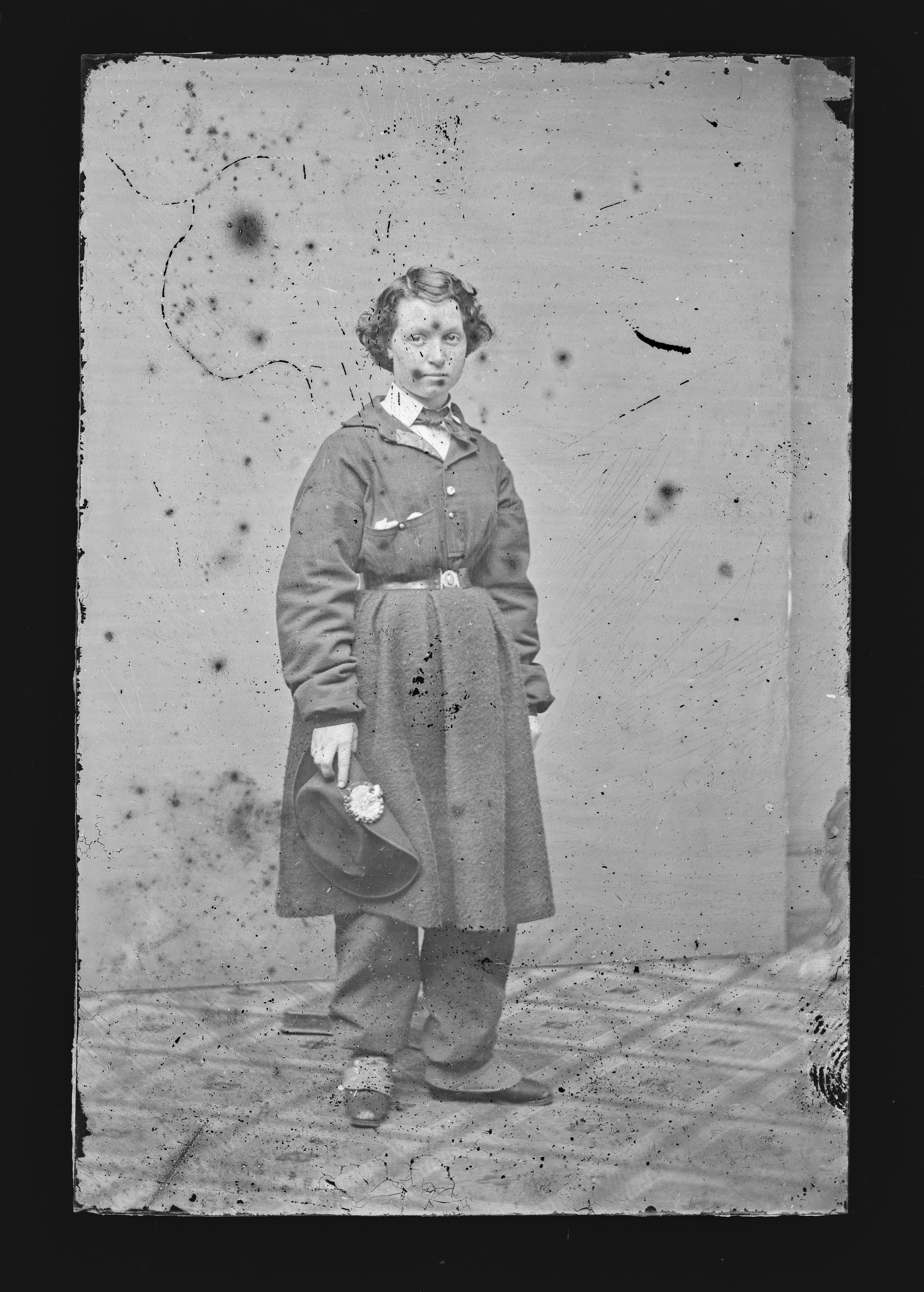
Photograph of Mary E. Walker by Mathew Brady Studio sometime during the period of c. 1860–1870.

She married a fellow medical school student, Albert Miller, on November 16, 1855, shortly before she turned 23. Walker wore a short skirt with trousers underneath, refused to include "obey" in her vows, and retained her last name. They set up a joint practice in Rome, New York. The practice did not flourish, as female physicians were generally not trusted or respected at that time. They later divorced, on account of Miller's infidelity.

Walker briefly attended Bowen Collegiate Institute (later named Lenox College) in Hopkinton, Iowa, in 1860, until she was suspended for refusing to resign from the school's debating society, which until she joined had been all male.

== American Civil War ==
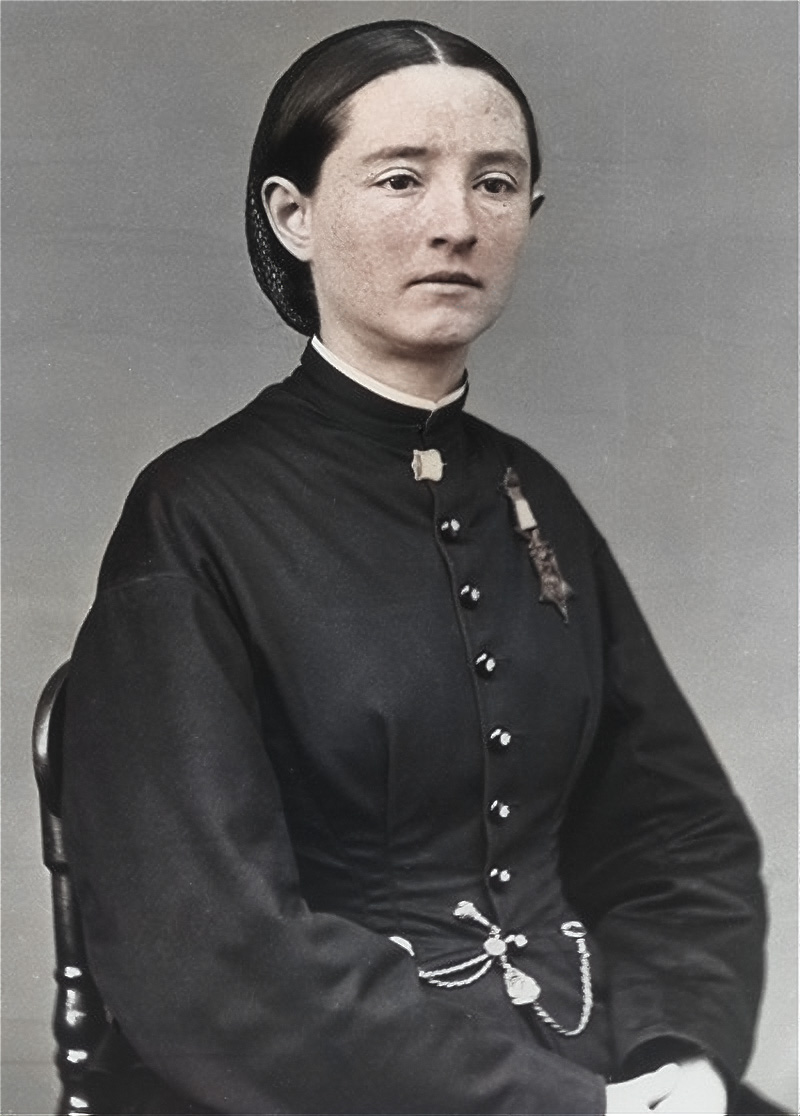
Photo of Walker wearing her Medal of Honor, awarded in 1865

Walker volunteered at the outbreak of the American Civil War as a surgeon – first for the Army, but was rejected because she was a woman (despite having kept a private practice for many years). She was offered the role of a nurse but declined and chose to volunteer as a surgeon for the Union Army as a civilian. The U.S. Army had no female surgeons, and at first, she was allowed to practice only as a nurse. During this period, she served at the First Battle of Bull Run, July 21, 1861, and at the Patent Office Hospital in Washington, D.C. She worked as an unpaid field surgeon near the Union front lines, including at the Battle of Fredericksburg and in Chattanooga after the Battle of Chickamauga. As a suffragist, she was happy to see women serving as soldiers, and alerted the press to the case of Frances Hook, in Ward 2 of the Chattanooga hospital, a woman who served in the Union forces disguised as a man. Walker was the first female surgeon of the Union army. She wore men's clothing during her work, claiming it to be easier for high demands of her work.

In September 1862, Walker wrote to the War Department requesting employment as a spy, but her proposal was declined. In September 1863, she was employed as a "Contract Acting Assistant Surgeon (civilian)" by the Army of the Cumberland, becoming the first female surgeon employed by the U.S. Army Surgeon. Walker was later appointed assistant surgeon of the 52nd Ohio Infantry. During her service, she frequently crossed battle lines and treated civilians.

On April 10, 1864, she was captured by Confederate troops, and arrested as a spy, just after she finished helping a Confederate doctor perform an amputation. She was sent to Castle Thunder in Richmond, Virginia, and remained there until August 12, 1864, when she was released as part of a prisoner exchange. While she was imprisoned, she refused to wear the clothes provided her, said to be more "becoming of her sex". Walker was exchanged for a Confederate surgeon from Tennessee on August 12, 1864.

She went on to serve as supervisor of a female prison in Louisville, Kentucky, and as the head of an orphanage in Tennessee.

== Later career ==
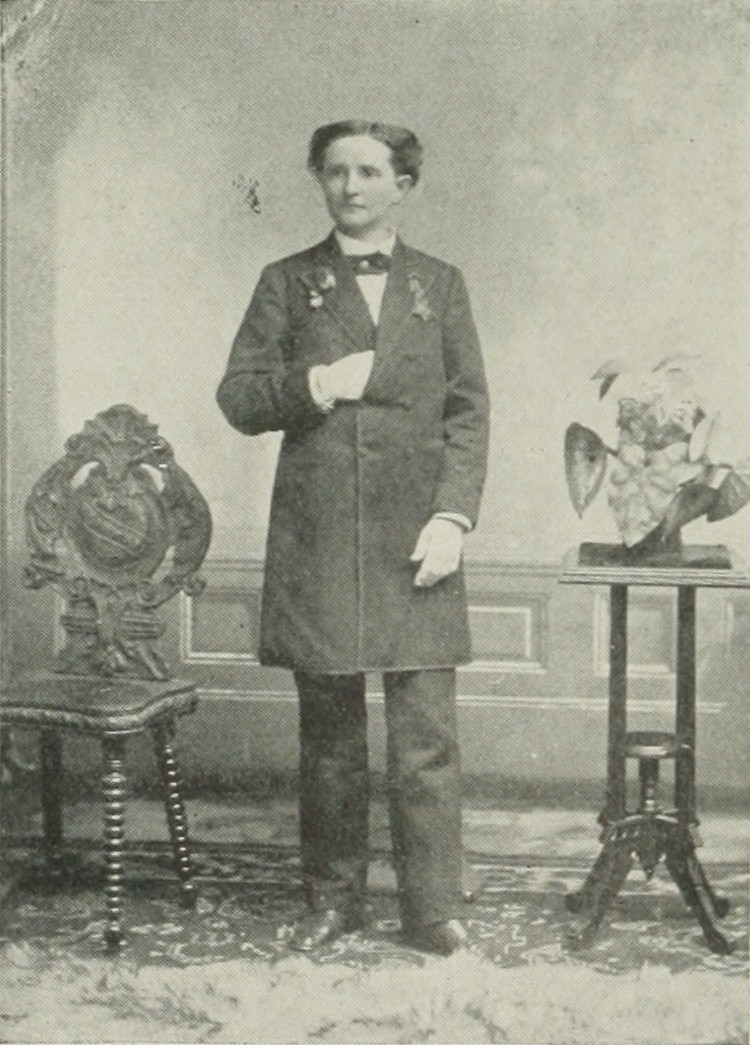
Walker, c. 1870.

After the war, Walker was awarded a disability pension for partial muscular atrophy suffered while she was imprisoned by the enemy. She was given $8.50 a month, beginning June 13, 1865, but in 1899 that amount was raised to $20 per month. She was awarded the Medal of Honor on Saturday, November 11th, 1865.

She became a writer and lecturer, supporting such issues as health care, temperance, women's rights, and dress reform for women. She was frequently arrested for wearing men's clothing, and insisted on her right to wear clothing that she thought appropriate. She wrote two books that discussed women's rights and dress. She replied to criticism of her attire: "I don't wear men's clothes, I wear my own clothes."

Walker was a member of the Central Woman's Suffrage Bureau in Washington, DC and solicited funds to endow a chair for a female professor at Howard University medical school. She attempted to register to vote in 1871, but was turned away. The initial stance of the movement, following her lead, was to claim that women already had the right to vote, and Congress needed only to enact enabling legislation. After a number of fruitless years advocating this position, the movement promoted the adoption of a constitutional amendment. This was diametrically opposed to her position, and she fell out of favor with the movement. She continued to attend suffrage conventions and distribute her own literature, but was virtually ignored by the rest of the movement. Her penchant for wearing masculine clothing, including a top hat, only exacerbated the situation. She received a more favorable reception in England than in the United States.

In 1907, Walker published "Crowning Constitutional Argument", in which she argued that some states, as well as the federal Constitution, had already granted women the right to vote. She testified on women's suffrage before committees of the U.S. House of Representatives in 1912 and 1914.

After a long illness, Walker died at home on February 21, 1919, at the age of 86. She was buried at Rural Cemetery in Oswego, New York, in a plain funeral, with an American flag draped over her casket, and wearing a black suit instead of a dress. Her death in 1919 came 544 days before the passage of the Nineteenth Amendment to the United States Constitution, which guaranteed women the right to vote.

== Dress reform ==
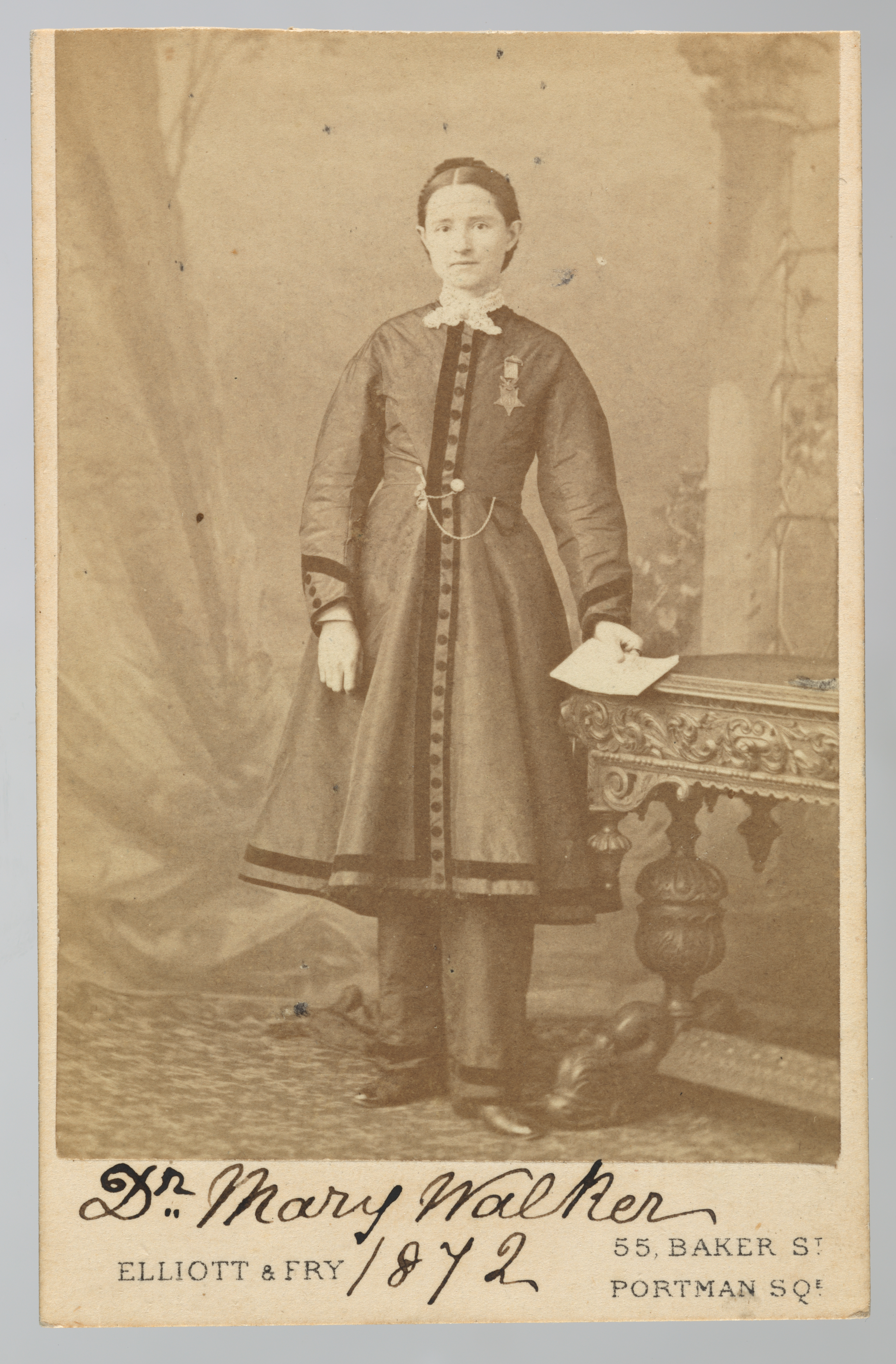
Mary E. Walker, photographed after the Civil War. As a prominent advocate for women's “reform dress,” she donned a shortened dress and “bloomer” pants for this photograph, along with her Medal of Honor.

Inspired by her parents' novel standard of dressing for health purposes, Walker was infamous for contesting traditional female wardrobe, a campaign then known as rational dress. In 1871, she wrote, "The greatest sorrows from which women suffer to-day are those physical, moral, and mental ones, that are caused by their unhygienic manner of dressing!" She strongly opposed women's long skirts with numerous petticoats, not only for their discomfort and their inhibition to the wearer's mobility but for their collection and spread of dust and dirt. As a young woman, she began experimenting with various skirt-lengths and layers, all with men's trousers underneath. By 1861, her typical ensemble included trousers with suspenders under a knee-length dress with a tight waist and full skirt.

While encouraged by her family, Walker's wardrobe choices were often met with criticism. Once, while a schoolteacher, she was assaulted on her way home by a neighboring farmer and a group of boys, who chased her and attacked her with eggs and other projectiles. Female colleagues in medical school criticized her choices, and patients often gawked at her and teased her. She nevertheless persisted in her mission to reform women's dress. Her view that women's dress should "protect the person, and allow freedom of motion and circulation, and not make the wearer a slave to it" made her commitment to dress reform as great as her zeal for abolitionism. She famously wrote to the women's journal, The Sibyl: A Review of the Tastes, Errors, and Fashions of Society, about her campaign against women's fashion, among other things, for its injuries to health, its expense, and its contribution to the dissolution of marriages. Her literature contributed to the spread of her ideas and made her a popular figure among other feminists and female physicians.

In 1870, Walker was arrested in New Orleans and mocked by men because she was dressed as a man. The arresting officer twisted her arm and asked her if she had ever been in a relationship with a man. Walker was released from custody when she was recognized at Police Court.

== Honors and awards ==
=== Medal of Honor ===
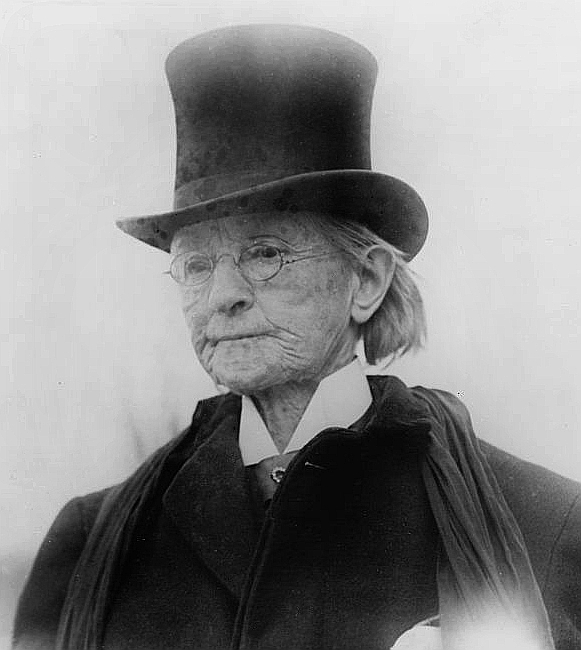
Walker, around 1911.

After the war, Walker sought a retroactive brevet or commission to validate her service. President Andrew Johnson directed Secretary of War Edwin Stanton to study the legality of the issue, and he solicited an opinion from the Army's Judge Advocate General, who determined that there was no precedent for commissioning a female, but that a "commendatory acknowledgment" could be issued in lieu of the commission. This led Johnson to personally award the Medal of Honor as an alternative. Thus, Walker was not formally recommended for the Medal of Honor, and this unusual process may also explain why authorities overlooked her ineligibility, ironically on the grounds of lacking a commission.

In 1916, the U.S. Congress created a pension act for Medal of Honor recipients, and in doing so created separate Army and Navy Medal of Honor Rolls. The Army was directed to review eligibility of prior recipients in a separate bill not related to the pension rolls, but which had been requested by the Army in order to retroactively police undesirable awards. The undesirable awards resulted from the lack of regulations on the medal.

The Army had published no regulations until 1897, and the law had very few requirements, meaning that recipients could earn a medal for virtually any reason, resulting in nearly 900 awards for non-combat enlistment extensions.

The Army's Medal of Honor Board deliberated from 1916 to 1917, and struck 911 names from the Army Medal of Honor Roll, including those of Dr. Mary Edwards Walker and William F. "Buffalo Bill" Cody. Both were considered ineligible for the Army Medal of Honor because 1862, 1863, and 1904 laws strictly required recipients to be officers or enlisted service members. In Walker's case, she was a civilian contract surgeon, not a commissioned officer.

Nevertheless, the Medal of Honor Board perhaps discriminated against Walker because it declined to revoke the Medal of at least two other contract surgeons who were likewise ineligible. One of these, Major General Leonard Wood, was a former Army Chief of Staff who was a civilian contract surgeon of the same status as Walker when he was recommended for the award. All of this was known to the Medal of Honor Board, as board president General Nelson Miles had twice recommended Wood for the medal, and knew that he was ineligible.

The dis-enrolled recipients were not ordered to return their medals per a recommendation from the Army Judge Advocate General, who noted that Congress did not grant the Army the jurisdiction to enforce this provision of the statute, rendering both the repossession and criminal penalties inoperative.

Although several sources attribute President Jimmy Carter with restoring Walker's medal posthumously in 1977, this is probably incorrect. The action was taken well below the Secretary of the Army, at the level of the Army's Assistant Secretary for Manpower and Reserve Affairs, which was acting on a recommendation from the Board for Correction of Military Records. In fact, both the Ford and Carter Administrations opposed the restoration; the Carter White House reacted with confusion to the announcement of the Board's decision.

A recent historical work documented that the Board for Correction probably exceeded its authority in making a unilateral restoration of the medal, since the Board is merely a delegation arm of the authority of the Secretary of the Army, and thus cannot contradict a standing law. Therefore, the Board's decision was controversial because its mandate was to only correct errors or injustices within its authority, not act against the authority of public law.

This very point was illustrated by the awarding of Garlin Conner's Medal of Honor in early 2018, which also originated from the Board for Correction, but instead went through the President and required a statutory waiver from Congress—seen to be a requirement because the Board lacked the authority to contravene a public law and the associated statutes of limitations.

Walker felt that she had been awarded the Medal of Honor because she had gone into enemy territory to care for the suffering inhabitants, when no man had the courage to do so, for fear of being imprisoned.

==== Attribution and citation ====
Rank and organization: Contract Acting Assistant Surgeon (civilian), U.S. Army. Places and dates: Battle of Bull Run, July 21, 1861; Patent Office Hospital, Washington, D.C., October 1861; Chattanooga, Tennessee, following Battle of Chickamauga, September 1863; Prisoner of War, April 10, 1864 – August 12, 1864, Richmond, Virginia; Battle of Atlanta, September 1864. Entered service at: Louisville, Kentucky. Born: 26 November 1832, Oswego County, New York.

Citation:

The President of the United States of America, in the name of Congress, takes pleasure in presenting the Medal of Honor to Assistant Surgeon - Civilian Mary Edwards Walker, United States Civilian, for extraordinary heroism as a Contract Surgeon to the Union Forces. Whereas it appears from official reports that Dr. Mary E. Walker, a graduate of medicine, "has rendered valuable service to the Government, and her efforts have been earnest and untiring in a variety of ways," and that she was assigned to duty and served as an assistant surgeon in charge of female prisoners at Louisville, Kentucky, upon the recommendation of Major Generals Sherman and Thomas, and faithfully served as contract surgeon in the service of the United States, and has devoted herself with much patriotic zeal to the sick and wounded soldiers, both in the field and hospitals, to the detriment of her own health, and has also endured hardships as a prisoner of war four months in a Southern prison while acting as contract surgeon; and Whereas by reason of her not being a commissioned officer in the military service, a brevet or honorary rank cannot, under existing laws, be conferred upon her; and Whereas in the opinion of the President an honorable recognition of her services and sufferings should be made: It is ordered, That a testimonial thereof shall be hereby made and given to the said Dr. Mary E. Walker, and that the usual medal of honor for meritorious services be given her. Given under my hand in the city of Washington, D.C., this 11th day of November, A.D. 1865. /s/ Andrew Johnson, President.

=== National Women's Hall of Fame ===
Walker was inducted into the National Women's Hall of Fame in 2000. The citation states, in part: "Today, society recognizes her achievements and her insistence that women be treated with the same respect as men."

=== In popular culture ===
Mary Walker was used as a character in the comic album Les Tuniques Bleues 54, entitled Miss Walker.

== Legacy ==
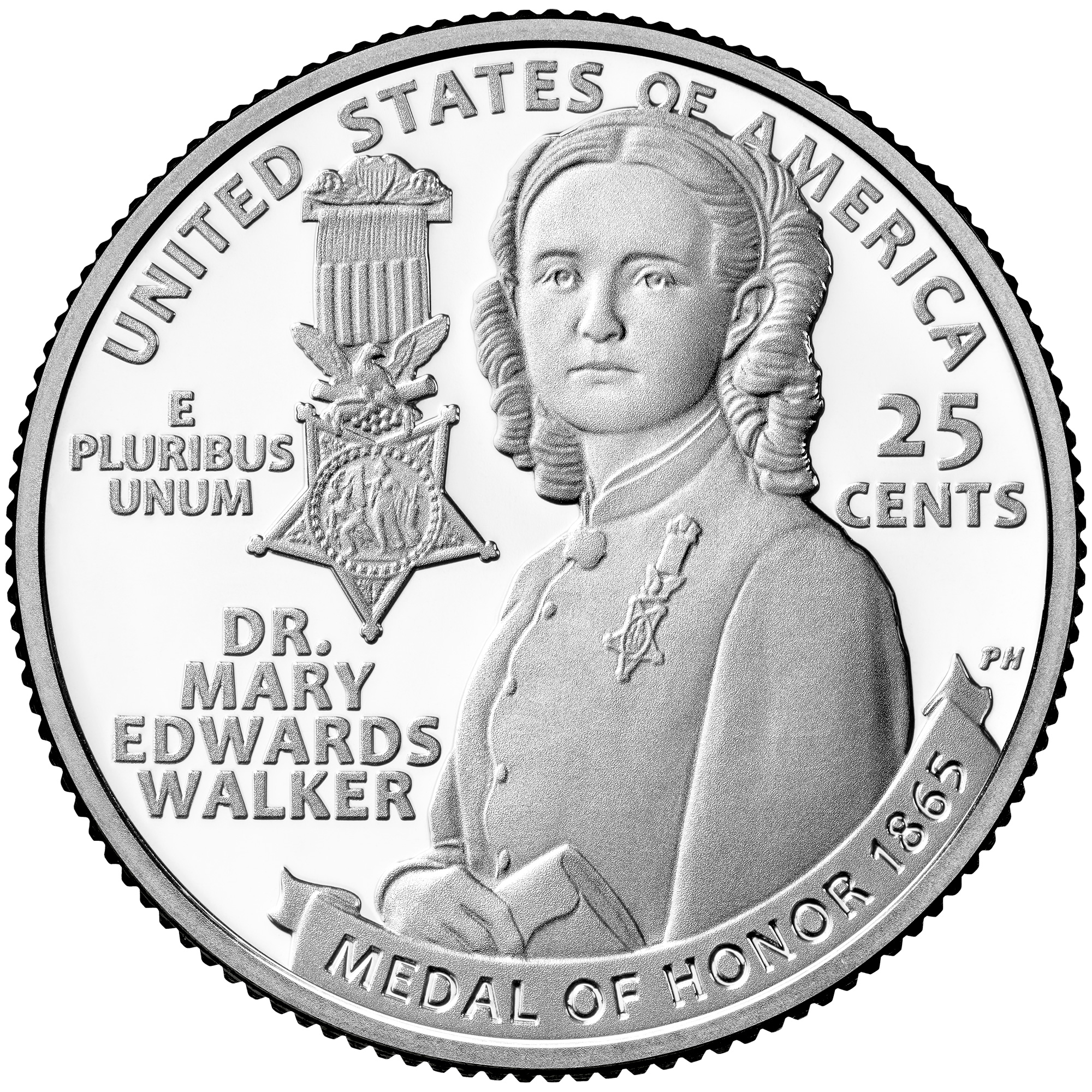
Walker is honored on a 2024 American Women quarter

During World War II, a Liberty ship, the SS Mary Walker, was named for her.

In 1982, the U.S. Postal Service issued a twenty five-cent stamp in her honor, commemorating the anniversary of her birth.

The medical facilities at SUNY Oswego are named in her honor (Mary Walker Health Center). On the same grounds a plaque explains her importance in the Oswego community.

There is a United States Army Reserve center named for her in Walker, Michigan.

The Whitman-Walker Clinic in Washington, D.C., is named in honor of Walker, and poet Walt Whitman, who was a nurse in D.C. during the Civil War.

The Mary Walker Clinic at Fort Irwin National Training Center in California is named in honor of Walker.

The Mary E. Walker House is a thirty-bed transitional residence run by the Philadelphia Veterans Multi-Service & Education Center for homeless women veterans.

In May 2012, a 900-pound bronze statue honoring Walker was unveiled in front of the Oswego, New York Town Hall.

In 2019, Walker was included in Hillary and Chelsea Clinton's book The Book of Gutsy Women: Favorite Stories of Courage and Resilience.

On August 25, 2023, Fort A.P. Hill in Virginia was officially renamed Fort Walker in her honor, as part of the US Defense Department's decision to change the names of military bases named after Confederate soldiers. Walker thus became the first woman in US History to have a United States military installation exclusively named after her. The Fort was renamed To Fort Anderson-Pinn-Hill (aka A.P. Hill) by the Trump Administration in June 2025.

Walker is an honoree on a 2024 American Women quarter. The design depicts Walker holding her pocket surgical kit with the Medal of Honor and a surgeon's pin on her uniform.

== Works ==
- Mary Edwards Walker (1912). Woman suffrage, No.1: hearings before the Committee on the Judiciary, House of Representatives, Sixty-second Congress, second session, statement of Dr. Mary E. Walker. February 14, 1912. United States. Congress. House. Committee on the Judiciary, Edward Thomas Taylor, Jane Addams. Government Printing Office. "Mary Edwards Walker."
- Walker, Mary Edwards (1871). Hit: Essays on Women's Rights. The American News Company. Reissued in paperback with a new introduction in 2003.
- Mary Edwards Walker (1878). Unmasked, or the Science of Immorality, To Gentlemen by a Woman Physician and Surgeon.

== Works about her ==
- Negley, Keith. Mary Wears What She Wants, January 15, 2019
- DiMeo, Nate. Mary Walker Would Wear What She Wanted The Memory Palace Podcast Episode 76, October 19, 2015. (Podcast detailing Mary Walker, her early life and accomplishments.)
- Gall-Clayton, Nancy. I'm Wearing My Own Clothes! (Full-length play commissioned and produced by Looking for Lilith Theatre Company, July 2017. I’m Wearing My Own Clothes!)
- Kaminski, Theresa. Dr. Mary Walker's Civil War: One Woman's Journey to the Medal of Honor and the Fight for Women's Rights. Guilford, CT: Lyons Press, 2020, ISBN 978-1-4930-3609-7.
- Lambil, Willy & Cauvin, Raoul. Miss Walker, Dupuis 2010, is a Belgian comic book in the "Bluecoats"-series (Les Tuniques Bleues). The comic album portrays Mary Walker in a caricatural way as a combative feminist during the civil war.

== See also ==
- Mary Ann Bickerdyke (1817–1901), a hospital administrator for the Union during the Civil War
