= List of Antiques Roadshow episodes =

Programmes of a British television series

Antiques Roadshow is a long-running British television series about the appraisal of antiques, broadcast on BBC One since the show's launch on 18 February 1979. It is currently in its forty-ninth series, with more than 850 episodes to date.

== Broadcast history ==
=== Regular series ===
==== Series 1 (1979) ====
Series 1: 8 editions from 18 February – 8 April 1979

- Newbury (18 February 1979)
- Bedworth (25 February 1979)
- Yeovil (4 March 1979)
- Northallerton (11 March 1979)
- Mold (18 March 1979)
- Buxton (25 March 1979)
- Perth (1 April 1979)
- Hereford (8 April 1979)

==== Series 2 (1980) ====
Series 2: 8 editions from 9 March – 27 April 1980

- Ely (9 March 1980)
- Llandrindod Wells (16 March 1980)
- Trowbridge (23 March 1980)
- Oldham (30 March 1980)
- Maidstone (6 April 1980)
- Camberley (13 April 1980)
- Stoke-on-Trent (20 April 1980)
- Guernsey (27 April 1980)

==== Series 3 (1981) ====
Series 3: 8 editions from 15 March – 3 May 1981

- Cheltenham (15 March 1981)
- Troon (22 March 1981)
- Aberystwyth (29 March 1981)
- Aylesbury (5 April 1981)
- Salisbury (12 April 1981)
- Monmouth (19 April 1981)
- Derby (26 April 1981)
- Bognor Regis (3 May 1981)

==== Series 4 (1982) ====
Series 4: 8 editions from 4 April – 23 May 1982

- Winchester (4 April 1982)
- Lancaster (11 April 1982)
- St Austell (18 April 1982)
- Leamington Spa (25 April 1982)
- Bolton (2 May 1982)
- Exeter (9 May 1982)
- Scarborough (16 May 1982)
- Malvern (23 May 1982)

==== Series 5 (1983) ====
Series 5: 8 editions from 3 April – 22 May 1983

- Harrogate (3 April 1983)
- Gloucester (10 April 1983)
- Dundee (17 April 1983)
- Leicester (24 April 1983)
- Torquay (1 May 1983)
- Norwich (8 May 1983)
- Southport (15 May 1983)
- Folkestone (22 May 1983)

==== Series 6 (1984) ====
Series 6: 7 editions from 8 April – 20 May 1984

- Poole (8 April 1984)
- Crewe (15 April 1984)
- Reading (22 April 1984)
- Aberdeen (29 April 1984)
- Eastbourne (6 May 1984)
- Blackburn (13 May 1984)
- Jersey (20 May 1984)

==== Series 7 (1985) ====
Series 7: 8 editions from 31 March – 19 May 1985

- Brangwyn Hall, Swansea (31 March 1985)
- Kendal (7 April 1985)
- Banbury (14 April 1985)
- Plymouth (21 April 1985)
- Nottingham (28 April 1985)
- Sunderland (5 May 1985)
- Guildhall, Portsmouth (12 May 1985)
- Douglas, Isle of Man (19 May 1985)

==== Series 8 (1986) ====
Series 8: 10 editions from 16 March – 18 May 1986

- Wolverhampton (16 March 1986)
- Edinburgh (23 March 1986)
- Corn Exchange, Ipswich (30 March 1986)
- Llandudno (6 April 1986)
- Bedford (13 April 1986)
- Doncaster (20 April 1986)
- Watford (27 April 1986)
- Hull (4 May 1986)
- Swindon (11 May 1986)
- Southend-on-Sea (18 May 1986)

==== Series 9 (1987) ====
Series 9: 12 editions from 4 January – 22 March 1987

- Barnstaple (4 January 1987)
- Dunfermline (11 January 1987)
- Southampton (18 January 1987)
- Chester (25 January 1987)
- Bath (1 February 1987)
- Newcastle-upon-Tyne (8 February 1987)
- Preston (15 February 1987)
- Carlisle (22 February 1987)
- Worthing (1 March 1987)
- Peterborough (8 March 1987)
- Camborne (15 March 1987)
- Margate (22 March 1987)

==== Series 10 (1988) ====
Series 10: 12 editions from 3 January – 20 March 1988

- Worcester (3 January 1988)
- Great Yarmouth (10 January 1988)
- Ventnor, Isle of Wight (17 January 1988)
- Bradford (24 January 1988)
- Cambridge (31 January 1988)
- Glasgow (7 February 1988)
- Cardiff (14 February 1988)
- Chelmsford (21 February 1988)
- Middlesbrough (28 February 1988)
- Belfast (6 March 1988)
- Maidenhead (13 March 1988)
- Cutlers' Hall, Sheffield (20 March 1988)

==== Series 11 (1989) ====
Series 11: 12 editions from 1 January – 19 March 1989

- Liverpool (1 January 1989)
- Harrow (8 January 1989)
- Birmingham (15 January 1989)
- Bournemouth (22 January 1989)
- Bristol (29 January 1989)
- Dublin, Ireland (5 February 1989) (Note: International edition.)
- Guildford (12 February 1989)
- Leeds (19 February 1989)
- Newark (26 February 1989)
- Hastings (5 March 1989)
- Glenrothes, Fife (12 March 1989)
- Tavistock (19 March 1989)

==== Series 12 (1989–90) ====
Series 12: 12 editions from 31 December 1989 – 18 March 1990

- Lincoln (31 December 1989)
- Tower Ballroom, Blackpool (7 January 1990)
- Paignton (14 January 1990)
- Elgin (21 January 1990)
- Elsinore Castle, Denmark (28 January 1990)
- Leominster (4 February 1990)
- Manchester Town Hall (11 February 1990)
- Royal Tunbridge Wells (18 February 1990)
- Malmö, Sweden (25 February 1990)
- Derngate Centre, Northampton (4 March 1990)
- Hornchurch (11 March 1990)
- Corn Exchange, Brighton (18 March 1990)

==== Series 13 (1990–91) ====
Series 13: 12 editions from 30 December 1990 – 17 March 1991

- Islington (30 December 1990)
- Darlington (6 January 1991)
- Merthyr Tydfil (13 January 1991)
- Stowmarket (20 January 1991)
- Hexham (27 January 1991)
- St. Ives (3 February 1991)
- Ayr (10 February 1991)
- Salisbury Cathedral (17 February 1991)
- Valletta, Malta (24 February 1991)
- Whitehaven (3 March 1991)
- Stafford (10 March 1991)
- Church of St George, Gillingham, Kent (17 March 1991)

==== Series 14 (1991–92) ====
Series 14: 12 editions from 29 December 1991 – 15 March 1992

- Alexandra Palace (29 December 1991)
- Queensferry (5 January 1992)
- Cleethorpes (12 January 1992)
- Farnham (19 January 1992)
- Enniskillen (26 January 1992)
- Chippenham (2 February 1992)
- Civic Hall, Stratford-upon-Avon (9 February 1992)
- Fleet Air Arm Museum, Yeovilton (16 February 1992)
- York (23 February 1992)
- Hemel Hempstead (1 March 1992)
- Stromness Academy, Orkney (8 March 1992)
- Rochdale (15 March 1992)

==== Series 15 (1992–93) ====
Series 15: 13 editions from 27 December 1992 – 21 March 1993

- Special: The Next Generation; National Railway Museum, York (27 December 1992)
- National Motor Museum, Beaulieu (3 January 1993)
- Berwick-upon-Tweed (10 January 1993)
- Kingsbridge (17 January 1993)
- Chesterfield (24 January 1993)
- Spalding (31 January 1993)
- Arts Centre of Warwick University (7 February 1993)
- Kingston, Jamaica (14 February 1993)
- Macclesfield (21 February 1993)
- Aberdeen (28 February 1993)
- Royal Borough of Kensington and Chelsea (7 March 1993)
- Pembroke (14 March 1993)
- Arundel Castle, Sussex (21 March 1993)

==== Series 16 (1993–94) ====
Series 16: 15 editions from 26 December 1993 – 3 April 1994

- Special: The Next Generation; Science Museum (26 December 1993)
- Trentham Gardens, Stoke-on-Trent (2 January 1994)
- Barrow-in-Furness (9 January 1994)
- Exeter (16 January 1994)
- Kidderminster (23 January 1994)
- Beaumaris, Anglesey (30 January 1994)
- Heveningham Hall, Suffolk (6 February 1994)
- Cork, Ireland (13 February 1994)
- Crawley (20 February 1994)
- Motherwell (27 February 1994)
- Olympia (6 March 1994)
- Gibraltar (13 March 1994)
- Ashford, Kent (20 March 1994)
- King's Lynn (27 March 1994)
- Raby Castle, County Durham (3 April 1994)

==== Series 17 (1995) ====
Series 17: 20 editions from 1 January – 14 May 1995

- Special: The Next Generation; Sherlock Holmes Baker Street film set, Manchester (1 January 1995)
- Truro Cathedral (8 January 1995)
- Colchester (15 January 1995)
- Wrekin College, Shropshire (22 January 1995)
- Bridlington (29 January 1995)
- De La Warr Pavilion, Bexhill-on-Sea (5 February 1995)
- Assembly Rooms, Derby (12 February 1995)
- Luton Hoo, Bedfordshire 1 (19 February 1995)
- Luton Hoo, Bedfordshire 2 (26 February 1995)
- Inverness (5 March 1995)
- Basingstoke (12 March 1995)
- St Peter Port, Guernsey (19 March 1995)
- Newcastle Emlyn, Dyfed (26 March 1995)
- Huddersfield (2 April 1995)
- Taunton (9 April 1995)
- Brussels, Belgium (16 April 1995)
- Accrington (23 April 1995)
- Wymondham, Norfolk (30 April 1995)
- Blenheim Palace, Oxfordshire 1 (7 May 1995)
- Blenheim Palace, Oxfordshire 2 (14 May 1995)

==== Series 18 (1995–96) ====
Series 18: 20 editions from 24 December 1995 – 5 May 1996

- Special: The Next Generation; Ulster Folk and Transport Museum (24 December 1995)
- Ely Cathedral (31 December 1995)
- Dover (7 January 1996)
- Llangollen, Clwyd (14 January 1996)
- Jersey (21 January 1996)
- Stirling (28 January 1996)
- Cheltenham (4 February 1996)
- Alnwick Castle 1 (11 February 1996)
- Alnwick Castle 2 (18 February 1996)
- Weymouth (25 February 1996)
- Mansfield (3 March 1996)
- Peebles (10 March 1996)
- Henley (17 March 1996)
- Windermere (24 March 1996)
- Penarth, South Glamorgan (31 March 1996)
- Fountains Abbey (7 April 1996)
- Broxbourne (14 April 1996)
- Apsley House (21 April 1996)
- Amsterdam, Netherlands (28 April 1996)
- Bishop's Palace, Wells, Somerset (5 May 1996)

==== Series 19 (1996–97) ====
Series 19: 26 editions from 27 October 1996 – 27 April 1997

- Portsmouth Dockyard (27 October 1996)
- Ludlow (3 November 1996)
- Skye (10 November 1996)
- Chepstow, Gwent (17 November 1996)
- Market Harborough (24 November 1996)
- Compilation: unseen bits/experts' favourites (1 December 1996)
- Penzance Harbour, Isles of Scilly (8 December 1996)
- Michelham Priory (15 December 1996)
- Special: The Next Generation; Royal Museum of Scotland, Edinburgh (29 December 1996)
- Christ's Hospital School, Horsham (5 January 1997)
- Bebington (12 January 1997)
- Lyme Regis (19 January 1997)
- Waddesdon Manor, Buckinghamshire 1 (26 January 1997)
- Waddesdon Manor, Buckinghamshire 2: Special (2 February 1997)
- Pickering (9 February 1997)
- Aberystwyth (16 February 1997)
- Saffron Walden (23 February 1997)
- Chatsworth House 1 (2 March 1997)
- Chatsworth House 2: Special (9 March 1997)
- City Hall, Perth (16 March 1997)
- Skegness (23 March 1997)
- Indoor School, Lord's Cricket Ground (30 March 1997)
- Moreton-in-Marsh (6 April 1997)
- Scone Palace (Perth) Special (including unseen bits) (13 April 1997)
- Hôtel de Ville (Town Hall), Arras, France (20 April 1997)
- Lanhydrock House, Bodmin (27 April 1997)

==== Series 20 (1997–98) ====
Series 20: 28 editions from 2 November 1997 – 17 May 1998

- Britannia Royal Naval College, Dartmouth (2 November 1997)
- Barnsley (9 November 1997)
- Woking (16 November 1997)
- Walsall Town Hall (23 November 1997)
- Marlborough College (30 November 1997)
- Claverton Manor (7 December 1997)
- Blickling Hall, Norfolk (14 December 1997)
- Special: The Next Generation; Techniquest, Cardiff Bay (28 December 1997)
- Christ Church, Oxford (4 January 1998)
- RAF Locking (11 January 1998)
- Durham (18 January 1998)
- West Dean College, Chichester 1 (25 January 1998)
- West Dean College, Chichester 2 (1 February 1998)
- Altrincham (8 February 1998)
- Fort William (15 February 1998)
- Newport, Isle of Wight (22 February 1998)
- Hull (1 March 1998)
- Burghley House 1 (8 March 1998)
- Burghley House 2 (15 March 1998)
- Porthmadog (22 March 1998)
- Reebok Stadium (29 March 1998)
- Bishop's Palace, St Davids, Pembrokeshire (5 April 1998)
- Minehead railway station (12 April 1998)
- Compilation: Harewood House Special (including unseen bits) (19 April 1998)
- Brecon, Powys (26 April 1998)
- Canterbury (3 May 1998)
- Cannock (10 May 1998)
- Dromoland Castle, County Clare (17 May 1998)

==== Series 21 (1998–99) ====
Series 21: 25 editions (including 21st anniversary special) from 27 September 1998 – 14 March 1999

- Welshpool (27 September 1998)
- Stranraer, Dumfries and Galloway (plus archive footage compilation) (4 October 1998)
- Coalville (11 October 1998)
- Royal Naval College, Greenwich (18 October 1998)
- Old Observatory, Greenwich (25 October 1998)
- Poole (1 November 1998)
- Bletchley (8 November 1998)
- Ormskirk (15 November 1998)
- Dorking (22 November 1998)
- Ickworth House, Suffolk 1 (29 November 1998)
- Ickworth House, Suffolk 2 (6 December 1998)
- Chapel of Lancing College, Sussex (13 December 1998)
- Special: The Next Generation; Heritage Motor Centre, Warwickshire (27 December 1998)
- Westonbirt School, Gloucestershire (3 January 1999)
- Gateshead (10 January 1999)
- Highclere Castle 1, Hampshire (17 January 1999)
- Highclere Castle 2, Hampshire 2 (plus unseen bits) (24 January 1999)
- Northallerton (31 January 1999)
- Carnoustie, Angus (7 February 1999)
- Gainsborough, Lincolnshire (14 February 1999)
- Syon Park 1 (21 February 1999)
- Syon Park 2 (plus unseen bits) (28 February 1999)
- Plymouth (7 March 1999)
- Lyme Park, Cheshire (14 March 1999)

==== Series 22 (1999–2000) ====
Series 22: 26 editions from 31 October 1999 – 21 May 2000

- Athelhampton House, Dorset (31 October 1999)
- Lowestoft (7 November 1999)
- Oldham (14 November 1999)
- Clydebank, Glasgow (21 November 1999)
- Castle Howard 1 (28 November 1999)
- Castle Howard 2 (plus unseen bits) (5 December 1999)
- Torquay (12 December 1999)
- Worcester Cathedral (19 December 1999)
- Eltham Palace (hosted from; with satellite links to four village halls elsewhere in UK) (2 January 2000)
- Winchester College 1 (16 January 2000)
- Winchester College 2 (plus unseen bits) (23 January 2000)
- Morpeth, Northumberland (30 January 2000)
- Llanelli (6 February 2000)
- Grantham, Lincolnshire (13 February 2000)
- Douglas, Isle of Man (20 February 2000)
- Castle Ashby 1 (5 March 2000)
- Castle Ashby 2 (plus unseen bits) (12 March 2000)
- Wrexham (19 March 2000)
- Clacton-on-Sea (26 March 2000)
- Halifax, West Yorkshire (2 April 2000)
- Reading, Berkshire (9 April 2000)
- Coleraine (16 April 2000)
- Keswick, Cumbria (23 April 2000)
- Bowes Museum (7 May 2000)
- Penshurst Place 1 (14 May 2000)
- Penshurst Place 2 (21 May 2000)

==== Series 23 (2000–01) ====
Series 23: 26 editions from 1 October 2000 – 1 April 2001

- Victoria and Albert Museum 1 (1 October 2000)
- Barnstaple (8 October 2000)
- Biddulph (15 October 2000)
- Glamis Castle 1 (22 October 2000)
- Glamis Castle 2 (29 October 2000)
- Selby (5 November 2000)
- Wisbech (12 November 2000)
- Blackpool (19 November 2000)
- Newport, Gwent (26 November 2000)
- Knebworth House 1 (3 December 2000)
- Knebworth House 2 (includes unseen bits) (10 December 2000)
- University of Birmingham (17 December 2000)
- Cliveden 1 (7 January 2001)
- Cliveden 2 (14 January 2001)
- Lochgilphead (21 January 2001)
- Salford (28 January 2001)
- Eastnor Castle 1 (4 February 2001)
- Eastnor Castle 2: Special (includes unseen bits) (11 February 2001)
- Eston (18 February 2001)
- Melksham (25 February 2001)
- Caernarfon (4 March 2001)
- Rugby (11 March 2001)
- Victoria and Albert Museum 2 (includes unseen bits) (18 March 2001)
- Forde Abbey 1 (25 March 2001)
- Forde Abbey 2 (1 April 2001)

==== Series 24 (2001–02) ====
Series 24: 26 editions from 2 September 2001 – 5 May 2002

- Buxton (2 September 2001)
- Kettering (9 September 2001)
- Hartlepool (16 September 2001)
- Hayward's Heath (23 September 2001)
- Newmarket 1 (30 September 2001)
- Newmarket 2 (7 October 2001)
- Bridgend (21 October 2001)
- Victoria and Albert Museum 3 (28 October 2001)
- Nottingham (4 November 2001)
- Mellerstain House 1 (11 November 2001)
- Mellerstain House 2 (includes unseen bits) (18 November 2001)
- Stroud (25 November 2001)
- Carlisle (2 December 2001)
- Royal Holloway 1 (9 December 2001)
- Royal Holloway 2 (16 December 2001)
- Special: The Next Generation; Milestones Museum, Basingstoke (31 December 2001)
- National Gallery of Canada, Ottawa, Canada (13 January 2002)
- Whitchurch, Shropshire (20 January 2002)
- Knightshayes Court 1 (3 February 2002)
- Knightshayes Court 2 (includes unseen bits) (24 February 2002)
- Witney (3 March 2002)
- St Austell (10 March 2002)
- Shetland (17 March 2002)
- Houghton Hall 1 (31 March 2002)
- Houghton Hall 2 (28 April 2002)
- Harrogate (5 May 2002)

==== Series 25 (2002–03) ====
Series 25: 28 editions (Including 25 Years On! special) from 1 September 2002 – 16 March 2003

- Special: 25 Years On! (1 September 2002)
- St. George's Hall, Liverpool (8 September 2002)
- Tenby (15 September 2002)
- Tidworth (22 September 2002)
- Warwick Castle 1 (29 September 2002)
- Warwick Castle 2 (6 October 2002)
- Harrogate (13 October 2002)
- Royal Yacht Britannia, Edinburgh (includes unseen bits) (20 October 2002)
- Chichester Cathedral (27 October 2002)
- Shugborough Hall 1 (3 November 2002)
- Shugborough Hall 2 (10 November 2002)
- Ramsgate (17 November 2002)
- Oban (24 November 2002)
- Leeds Town Hall (1 December 2002)
- Royal Armouries Museum, Leeds (8 December 2002)
- Uppingham School, Rutland (15 December 2002)
- Mansion House (22 December 2002)
- Special: The Next Generation; Imperial War Museum, Cambridgeshire (29 December 2002)
- Toronto, Canada (5 January 2003)
- Clitheroe (12 January 2003)
- Chartwell (19 January 2003)
- Sherborne School 1 (2 February 2003)
- Sherborne School 2 (9 February 2003)
- Dunrobin Castle 1 (16 February 2003)
- Dunrobin Castle 2 (includes unseen bits) (23 February 2003)
- Renishaw Hall 1 (2 March 2003)
- Renishaw Hall 2 (9 March 2003)
- Compilation of viewers' favourite clips (16 March 2003)

==== Series 26 (2003–04) ====
Series 26: 26 editions from 7 September 2003 – 29 February 2004

- Sudeley Castle, near Winchcombe, Gloucestershire (7 September 2003)
- Bala (14 September 2003)
- Burton-upon-Trent (21 September 2003)
- Redruth (28 September 2003)
- National Maritime Museum Special (5 October 2003)
- Dumfries (12 October 2003)
- Cressing Temple (19 October 2003)
- Chichester Cathedral (26 October 2003)
- Kendal Castle (2 November 2003)
- Dyrham Park 1 (9 November 2003)
- Dyrham Park 2 (16 November 2003)
- Boston (23 November 2003)
- Clitheroe (30 November 2003)
- Abergavenny (7 December 2003)
- Mount Stewart, County Down 1 (14 December 2003)
- Mount Stewart, County Down 2 (21 December 2003)
- Special: The Next Generation; (28 December 2003)
- Woburn Abbey, Bedfordshire 1 (4 January 2004)
- Woburn Abbey, Bedfordshire 2 (11 January 2004)
- Scarborough (18 January 2004)
- St Ives (25 January 2004)
- Royal Hospital Haslar (1 February 2004)
- Wigan (8 February 2004)
- London to Brighton (15 February 2004)
- Royal Horticultural Society Gardens, Wisley 1 (22 February 2004)
- Royal Horticultural Society Gardens, Wisley 2 (29 February 2004)

==== Series 27 (2004–05) ====
Series 27: 25 editions from 5 September 2004 – 20 March 2005

- Portmeirion (5 September 2004)
- Haltwhistle (12 September 2004)
- Hastings (19 September 2004)
- Witley Court (26 September 2004)
- Magna Centre (3 October 2004)
- Rotherham (10 October 2004)
- The National Archives (17 October 2004)
- Hampton Court Palace 1 (24 October 2004)
- Hampton Court Palace 2 (31 October 2004)
- Hornsea (7 November 2004)
- Dyrham Park (14 November 2004)
- Edinburgh (21 November 2004)
- Wilton House (28 November 2004)
- City Hall, Cardiff (5 December 2004)
- Cardiff Castle (12 December 2004)
- King's College, Cambridge 1 (2 January 2005)
- King's College, Cambridge 2 (9 January 2005)
- Special: The Next Generation; Birmingham (16 January 2005)
- Tyntesfield House (23 January 2005)
- Stornoway, Isle of Lewis (30 January 2005)
- Victoria Baths, Manchester (6 February 2005)
- HMS Victory, Portsmouth (13 February 2005)
- The Leisure Centre, Abergavenny (20 February 2005)
- Ipswich (27 February 2005)
- Dartington Hall 1 (6 March 2005)
- Dartington Hall 2 (13 March 2005)
- Season's retrospective (20 March 2005)

==== Series 28 (2005–06) ====
Series 28: 25 editions from 4 September 2005 – 19 March 2006

- Lichfield Cathedral (4 September 2005)
- University of Wales, Lampeter (11 September 2005)
- Edinburgh (18 September 2005)
- Normanby Hall (25 September 2005)
- Pannier Market, Tavistock (2 October 2005)
- Compilation episode (9 October 2005)
- Ipswich (16 October 2005)
- Beamish Museum (23 October 2005)
- Manderston House (30 October 2005)
- Rochdale Town Hall (6 November 2005)
- Royal Hospital, Chelsea (13 November 2005)
- Ventnor Winter Gardens, Ventnor (20 November 2005)
- Compilation episode (27 November 2005)
- Lancaster Town Hall (4 December 2005)
- Coughton Court 1 (11 December 2005)
- Coughton Court 2 (18 December 2005)
- Special: The Next Generation; British Empire and Commonwealth (28 December 2005)
- Sydney (1 January 2006)
- Norwich Cathedral 1 (15 January 2006)
- Norwich Cathedral 2 (22 January 2006)
- Millennium Forum, Derry (12 February 2006)
- Compilation episode (19 February 2006)
- Montacute House, Somerset 1 (26 February 2006)
- Montacute House, Somerset 2 (5 March 2006)
- Royal Exhibition Building, Melbourne (12 March 2006)
- Season's retrospective (19 March 2006)

==== Series 29 (2006–07) ====
Series 29: 31 editions, including Greatest Finds and Season's Retrospective, from 3 September 2006 – 29 April 2007

- Greatest Finds 1 (3 September 2006)
- Greatest Finds 2 (10 September 2006)
- Greatest Finds 3 (17 September 2006)
- Gloucester Cathedral 1 (24 September 2006)
- Carter's Steam Fair, London (1 October 2006)
- Kedleston Hall 1 (8 October 2006)
- Auckland Castle 1 (15 October 2006)
- Auckland Castle 2 (22 October 2006)
- Guildhall, Swansea (29 October 2006)
- Hughenden Manor (5 November 2006)
- Hughenden Manor; unseen items (12 November 2006)
- Kedleston Hall 2 (19 November 2006)
- Music Hall, Aberdeen (26 November 2006)
- Prideaux Place, Padstow 1 (3 December 2006)
- Prideaux Place, Padstow 2 (10 December 2006)
- Arundel Castle (17 December 2006)
- Special: The Next Generation; Edinburgh (31 December 2006)
- Gloucester Cathedral 2 (7 January 2007)
- Australia Special: Sydney and Melbourne (14 January 2007)
- Symphony Hall, Birmingham (28 January 2007)
- Holkham Hall 1 (4 February 2007)
- Holkham Hall 2 (11 February 2007)
- Southport 1 (18 February 2007)
- Southport 2 (25 February 2007)
- Wakehurst Place, Ardingly (18 March 2007)
- Kelvingrove Art Gallery and Museum 1 (25 March 2007)
- Kelvingrove Art Gallery and Museum 2 (1 April 2007)
- Tavistock (8 April 2007)
- Lacock Abbey 1 (15 April 2007)
- Lacock Abbey 2 (22 April 2007)
- Season's retrospective (29 April 2007)

==== Series 30 (2007–08) ====
Series 30: 27 editions from 2 September 2007 – 30 March 2008

- The Courtyard Centre for the Arts, Hereford (2 September 2007)
- Arundel Castle (9 September 2007)
- Alnwick Castle (16 September 2007)
- Burleigh Pottery, Middleport (23 September 2007)
- Wills Memorial Building, Bristol (30 September 2007)
- Coventry Cathedral (7 October 2007)
- Banqueting House, London 1 (14 October 2007)
- Banqueting House, London 2 (21 October 2007)
- Highcliffe Castle, Dorset (28 October 2007)
- Compilation episode (4 November 2007)
- Aviation Centre, East Kirkby 1 (11 November 2007)
- Aviation Centre, East Kirkby 2 (18 November 2007)
- Exmouth (25 November 2007)
- Powis Castle (2 December 2007)
- Rochester Cathedral 1 (16 December 2007)
- Rochester Cathedral 2 (23 December 2007)
- De La Warr Pavilion, Bexhill-on-Sea 1 (30 December 2007)
- Castle of Mey, Scotland (6 January 2008)
- St. George's Hall, Liverpool 1 (13 January 2008)
- St. George's Hall, Liverpool 2 (20 January 2008)
- Kentwell Hall, Long Melford 1 (27 January 2008)
- De Montfort Hall, Leicester (3 February 2008)
- Coronation Hall, Ulverston (10 February 2008)
- Special: Sport Relief: Lord's Cricket Ground (16 February 2008)
- De La Warr Pavilion, Bexhill-on-Sea 2 (17 February 2008)
- Sheffield City Hall (2 March 2008)
- Special: Farewell to Michael Aspel (30 March 2008)

==== Series 31 (2008–09) ====
Series 31: 26 editions from 7 September 2008 – 12 April 2009

- Bolton Abbey, Wharfedale (7 September 2008)
- Althorp, Northamptonshire (14 September 2008)
- Chester Cathedral 1 (21 September 2008)
- Ascot Racecourse, Ascot (28 September 2008)
- Compilation 1 (5 October 2008)
- Lanhydrock, near Bodmin, Cornwall (12 October 2008)
- Southwell Minster 1 (19 October 2008)
- Southwell Minster 2 (26 October 2008)
- Leeds Castle, Kent 1 (2 November 2008)
- Leeds Castle, Kent 2 (9 November 2008)
- The Sage Gateshead (16 November 2008)
- Bodnant Garden, near Tal-y-Cafn (23 November 2008)
- Compilation 2 (30 November 2008)
- Hertford College, Oxford 1 (7 December 2008)
- Dumfries House, Ayrshire, Scotland (21 December 2008)
- Bridlington Spa Royal Hall, Bridlington 1 (28 December 2008)
- RMS Titanic Drawing Offices, Belfast 1 (4 January 2009)
- RMS Titanic Drawing Offices, Belfast 2 (11 January 2009)
- Bishop's Palace, Wells, Somerset 1 (18 January 2009)
- Bishop's Palace, Wells, Somerset 2 (25 January 2009)
- Caird Hall, Dundee, Scotland (1 February 2009)
- Dulwich Picture Gallery 1 (8 February 2009)
- Dulwich Picture Gallery 2 (15 February 2009)
- Bridlington Spa Royal Hall, Bridlington 2 (29 March 2009)
- Oxburgh Hall, Oxborough, near Swaffham (5 April 2009)
- Season's retrospective (12 April 2009)

==== Series 32 (2009–10) ====
Series 32: 30 editions from 20 September 2009 – 9 May 2010

- Samarès Manor, Jersey (20 September 2009)
- Blackpool Tower Ballroom 1 (27 September 2009)
- Blackpool Tower Ballroom 2 (4 October 2009)
- Hertford College, Oxford 2 (11 October 2009)
- Morwellham Quay, Devon (25 October 2009)
- Lincoln Cathedral 1 (1 November 2009)
- Lincoln Cathedral 2 (8 November 2009)
- Bowes Museum, Barnard Castle (15 November 2009)
- Bletchley Park 1 (22 November 2009)
- Bletchley Park 2 (29 November 2009)
- Burghley House, Stamford (6 December 2009)
- Abbotsford House, near Melrose (20 December 2009)
- Saumarez Park, Guernsey (3 January 2010)
- Brooklands Museum, Weybridge 1 (10 January 2010)
- Brooklands Museum, Weybridge 2 (17 January 2010)
- Aberglasney Gardens, Carmarthenshire (24 January 2010)
- Bath Assembly Rooms 1 (31 January 2010)
- Bath Assembly Rooms 2 (7 February 2010)
- Blists Hill Victorian Town, Ironbridge (14 February 2010)
- Leeds Town Hall 1 (21 February 2010)
- Leeds Town Hall 2 (28 February 2010)
- Somerleyton Hall, Somerleyton 1 (7 March 2010)
- Hopetoun House, South Queensferry 1 (21 March 2010)
- Stanway House, Gloucestershire 1 (28 March 2010)
- Stanway House, Gloucestershire 2 (4 April 2010)
- Compilation episode: Abbotsford House and Burghley House (11 April 2010)
- Chester Cathedral 2 (18 April 2010)
- Old Royal Naval College, Greenwich 1 (25 April 2010)
- Old Royal Naval College, Greenwich 2 (2 May 2010)
- Season's Retrospective (9 May 2010)

==== Series 33 (2010–11) ====
Series 33: 29 editions from 19 September 2010 – 17 July 2011

- Beverley Minster 1 (19 September 2010)
- Beverley Minster 2 (26 September 2010)
- Somerleyton Hall, Somerleyton 2 (3 October 2010)
- STEAM – Museum of the Great Western Railway, Swindon 1 (10 October 2010)
- Brighton College 1 (17 October 2010)
- Brighton College 2 (24 October 2010)
- Hopetoun House, South Queensferry 2 (31 October 2010)
- British Museum 1 (7 November 2010)
- Tatton Park, near Knutsford 1 (14 November 2010)
- Tatton Park, near Knutsford 2 (21 November 2010)
- Hatfield House 1 (28 November 2010)
- Chatsworth House, Derbyshire 1 (5 December 2010)
- Chatsworth House, Derbyshire 2 (26 December 2010)
- Blair Castle, near Blair Atholl, Scotland 1 (2 January 2011)
- Hampton Court Castle, Herefordshire 1 (20 February 2011)
- Britannia Royal Naval College, Dartmouth 1 (27 February 2011)
- Britannia Royal Naval College, Dartmouth 2 (6 March 2011)
- Victoria Hall, Saltaire 1 (13 March 2011)
- Victoria Hall, Saltaire 2 (20 March 2011)
- St Fagans National History Museum, Cardiff (27 March 2011)
- British Museum 2 (3 April 2011)
- STEAM – Museum of the Great Western Railway, Swindon 2 (10 April 2011)
- Hatfield House 2 (17 April 2011)
- Winchester Cathedral 1 (24 April 2011)
- Winchester Cathedral 2 (1 May 2011)
- Hutton-in-the-Forest, near Penrith, Cumbria (8 May 2011)
- Hampton Court Castle, Herefordshire 2 (29 May 2011)
- Season's retrospective (5 June 2011)
- Compilation episode (17 July 2011)

==== Series 34 (2011–12) ====
Series 34: 29 editions (including Shakespeare and Diamond Jubilee specials) from 18 September 2011 – 8 July 2012

- Manchester Town Hall 1 (18 September 2011)
- Charlecote Park, near Stratford-upon-Avon 1 (25 September 2011)
- Lulworth Castle, Dorset 1 (2 October 2011)
- Blair Castle, near Blair Atholl, Scotland 2 (9 October 2011)
- Hever Castle, Kent 1 (16 October 2011)
- Hever Castle, Kent 2 (23 October 2011)
- Birmingham University 1 (30 October 2011)
- Aberystwyth University 1 (6 November 2011)
- Remembrance Special, Staffordshire (13 November 2011)
- Seaton Delaval 1 (20 November 2011)
- Castle Coole, Enniskillen 1 (27 November 2011)
- Layer Marney Tower, Essex 1 (4 December 2011)
- Layer Marney Tower, Essex 2 (11 December 2011)
- Christmas Retrospective 2011 (18 December 2011)
- Hartland Abbey, Devon 1 (8 January 2012)
- Hartland Abbey, Devon 2 (19 February 2012)
- Saint Andrews University 1 (26 February 2012)
- Lulworth Castle, Dorset 2 (4 March 2012)
- Weald and Downland Museum, Sussex 1 (11 March 2012)
- Yorkshire Museum, York 1 (18 March 2012)
- Yorkshire Museum, York 2 (25 March 2012)
- Wimbledon 1 (1 April 2012)
- Wimbledon 2 (8 April 2012)
- Manchester Town Hall 2 (15 April 2012)
- Special: Shakespeare, filmed in Stratford-upon-Avon (29 April 2012)
- Seaton Delaval 2 (7 May 2012)
- Special: Diamond Jubilee, filmed at Kensington Palace, London (10 June 2012)
- Birmingham University 2 (17 June 2012)
- Weald and Downland Museum, Sussex 2 (8 July 2012)

Extracts from this series

No. in series	Location	Filming date	Original release date	UK viewers (millions)
1	"Manchester Town Hall, Manchester"	TBA	18 September 2011	5.60
Experts: Jon Baddeley, Eric Knowles, Elaine Binning, David Battie, Will Farmer, Justin Croft, Rupert Maas, Lars Tharp, John Benjamin, Graham Lay, Andy McConnell, John Foster, Judith Miller, Steven Moore, Mark Hill, John Axford, Duncan Campbell – Great Hall of Manchester Town Hall, including 12 murals by Ford Madox Brown – toy Alfa Romeo P2 racing car made by CIJ (=Compagnie industrielle du jouet) of France in 1920s, £3,000 – 1920s mechanical Teddybear by Schuko of Nuremberg, Germany, £1,200 – Italian Renaissance revival bust in bronze and Alabaster, sculpted by Gustave Varenburg (poss. G.V. Wehrenberg) style of Naples or Turin, £1,800 – musical chair, ornately carved and inlaid with Chamois motifs, made in Brienz, Switzerland, £2,000 – Japanese figure carrying sword, net and monkey. Carved in ivory by Harojama of the 'Tokyo School' (set up by Ishikawa Komei), c. 1890, £8,000 – leather belt with silver buckle concealing a Cyma Watches Swiss watch, 1920s, £600 – decorated 'fireplace' tiles made by Pilkingtons, decorated by John Chambers for William and Joseph Burton, £150 per tile – score of Der Ring des Nibelungen – Die Walkiere by Richard Wagner. Donated by the great-granddaughters of music conductor Doctor Hans Richter, to The Hallé orchestra archive. A personal wedding gift from Wagner to Richter, £20,000 – faux copy of George Stubbs painted panel of Horses Fighting 1787, which disappeared, £2,000 – peacock blue vase from the Aesthetic movement 1890s Manufacture nationale de Sèvres, £500 – gold necklace Classical revival 1865–70, made by Robert Phillips, £3,000 – collection of drawings by John Mennie. Singapore in World War II, including the Selarang Square Squeeze from September 1942. Mennie (died 1982) trained at Gray's School of Art in Aberdeen and Westminster School of Art in London. He worked as an art teacher, £1,200 – glass bowl decorated in Vienna Secession style, the Habsburg Empire version of Art Nouveau (Jūgendstils), £300 – award-winning photograph of clog-maker and his apprentice c1910, plus the clogs in the photo, £30 – lesson in pearl quality – 1900s toy In the country – The Model Village with hand-written message 'Father wishes Ernest a happy Christmas'. Made in Bavaria, £1,000 – Clarice Cliff Mr Fish wall pocket, 1930s, £150, and fake Clarice Cliff ornament – collection of cartoon Careless Talk Costs Live posters from World War II by Fougasse (=Cyril Kenneth Bird), £1,500 – broken Japanese Arita porcelain cat, made in 1680, £300 – silver cigarette case, autographed book and decorated scroll, presented to Lieutenant Glover and engraved/signed with the names of the White Russian Aristocracy who escaped to Crimea, Yalta and Malta in 1918, £10,000 – Suffragette scarf from 1918, depicting Women's Rights in 1981.
2	"Charlecote Park, Warwickshire"	TBA	25 September 2011	5.79
Experts: Geoffrey Munn, Mark Poltimore, Fergus Gambon, Katherine Higgins, Ben Wright, Andy McConnell, Hilary Kay, Dominic Winter, John Axford, Clive Stewart Lockhart, Geoffrey Munn – George Hammond Lucy and his wife Elizabeth extensively remodelled Charlecote House in the 19th century. – Gold lapel pin with feather motif and Ouroboros (snake formed as an eternal circle) made by P.Orr and Sons, Madras, gift from Edward VII, £1,000 – painting of Polish cavalry officer by Michał Gorstkin-Wywiórski, marked 1885 Munich, £7,000 – collection of ceramic Cream jugs shaped like cows. Range including William Taylor Copeland, Spode, and fake Delft. Black glazed late 19th century Staffordshire, £30; Welsh jugs from Glamorgan Pottery £500 each; Pair of Yorkshire jugs, sponge decorated, £2,000, pair of Staffordshire creamware jugs, with 'Wealden type' glaze, £4,000 – Art Deco sofa, 1930s, £800 – Swiss pocket watch in 'hunter case' with complex movement showing day, date, hours, minutes, month and moon. Belonged to Polish pilot who was a prisoner of war in WWII, £600 – 1900s Glass vase from John Walsh Walsh of Stourbridge, £500 – mannequin from Drapery shop window, 1930s, £150 – Marcel Breuer chair, £600 – Sanderson Miller 1810, Regency Gothic Revival with trompe-l'œil features. £500 – 1953 Charles and Ray Eames Eames Lounge Chair, £3,000 – 1901 oil painting of Agnes Bowman (daughter of Sir William Bowman, 1st Baronet) by Valentine Cameron Prinsep (Professor of the Royal Academy of Art), £12,000 – toilet roll rejected by the Beatles from Abbey Road Studio (too hard and shiny) – two volumes (of three) of Buck's Antiquities; or Venerable Remains published by Samuel and Nathaniel Buck in 1774. Bound in 'Red Morrroccan' leather by 'Rivière and Son'Fletcher, W.Y. "Riviere, Robert" . Dictionary of National Biography. Vol. 48. pp. 334–335., £6,000 (£40,000 with third volume) – stone carvings from the Gandhara Kingdom in 2nd century AD, developed their skills from Alexander the Great's empire. ££600, £1,000 and £2,500 respectively – photograph of witness who gave evidence at trial of George Joseph Smith, The Brides in the Bath murderer. – coronation cup and saucer presented by Queen Alexandra to Mrs Crossley, 1903 – automaton moving scene to advertise 'Armitages Chicken Feed', 1930s, £700 – army record book, medals and memorabilia of William Henry Dale, born 1869, served from 14-year-old trumpeter to be Lieutenant Colonel, £15,000 – nutbrown glass knife – amethyst and diamond ring, platinum, 1900, £1,000 – The Archers memorabilia, cups, jigsaws. Autographed by Hedli Niklaus (aka Kathy Perks). – painting on wooden panel by Swiss artist Edouard Castres, 1873, £5,000 – collection of gold boxes, £50,000 – enameled scene made in Geneva for Turkish market, £6,000 – micro mosaic, tesseret of coloured glass, £15,000 – 1900s Siberian Jade Rococo revival cigarette case, made by satellite firm of the House of Fabergé, £20,000
3	"Lulworth Castle, Lulworth Cove, Dorset"	TBA	2 October 2011	5.98
Experts: Hilary Kay, Paul Atterbury, Nicholas Mitchell, Grant Ford, Judith Miller, Richard Price, David Battie, Elaine Binning, Rupert Maas, John Sandon, Joanna Hardy, Henry Sandon, John Foster – cameo from Bovington Tank Museum – a selection of Whitanco toys, c1920s (Whiteley Tansey & Company Ltd, registered in 1912 at Beech Street, Liverpool but grew after the First World War when German toys became unpopular): - 1920s car £1,000; - Spinning top £100; - Tank £300. – the Statement of Abdication (see also s:Statement of Abdication) made by Edward VIII sent as a letter to a select group of national dignitaries and administrators. £1,000 – ornate aneroid barometer, 1870s, with painted porcelain face in the style of the Aesthetic movement. Possibly painted by G. Sisirges. Value more than £3,000 – 1888 painting of sheep by Charles Jones R.A. (aka Sheep Jones) £5,000 – Queen Victoria's knickers (or a sail) £600 – 1875-1880 carriage clock by J.M. Badollet & Co of Geneva (Jean Badollet, 1635-1718 founded the 300-year dynasty of clock makers) £3,500 – Japanese Budai - the God of Good Fortune, one of the Seven Lucky Gods, carved in Ivory by 'Katsuragi' in 1919. £800 – collection of silver spoons £40,000. Apostle spoon from Barnstaple £6,000; Puritan spoon £3,000; Funeral spoon; Lion spoon by Robert Wade of Bridgwater and Taunton £4,000 – 'mongrel' desk in multiple styles, woods and periods. Stained beech, pine and Oak. 17th century through 20th century. £200 – 1890 painting of cats by Théophile Steinlen from Montmartre, Paris. (Designer of posters for Le Chat Noir) £2,500 – 1900s fake HMS Eagle (1774) wine glass, engraved with Success to the Eagle Frigate. (Eagle was one of Nelson's fleet). £400 – The Beatles single, Please Please Me, autographed at The Cavern Club by John, Paul, George and Ringo. £3,000 – Cravat stick pin. Late 19th century English men's jewellery with carved moonstone face wearing a diamond tiara. £1,500 – Posset pot, 1680, 'tin glazed' English Delftware (riveted), £1,000 – painting of Ladies in a landscape by Spanish artist Francisco Morales, 1879 (trained in Barcelona and Madrid, but achieved success in Paris), value £12,000 – two blown glass decanters, 1865–75, one decorated with a 'wreath of thistles' and a 'fighting lassie' symbolising Scottish culture, the other decorated with 'Spider, web and ivy' plus a 'figure of death' taking the soul. Possibly made by Ford of Edinburgh. but probably by 'Stevens and Williams' of Stourbridge. £1,500 and £2,500 – Tankard (Jack) made from the skin of Oliver Cromwell's war-horse, decorated with his crest and inscribed. Deposited at C. Hoare & Co bank in Fleet Street. c1653. £30,000 – Rolls-Royce Limited armoured car.
4	"Blair Castle, Blair Atholl, Perthshire"	TBA	9 October 2011	5.96
Experts: Paul Atterbury, Lars Tharp, John Benjamin, Lennox Cato, Andy McConnell, Hilary Kay, Bunny Campione, John Axford, Steven Moore, Grant Ford, Alastair Dickenson – Cartoon titled Finsbury Circus of the Red Cross parcel handling offices during World War II, painted by Mary McNeil £500 – pair of Chinese vases, decorated with '1000 scholar's objects', including a Chúi, mid 19th century, £5,000 – Russian brooch, 1880, diamonds, yellow sapphire, aquamarine, pink topaz, pearls. £10,000 – diamond ring, 1830s £5,000 – Toby Jug based on Sir Toby Philpott, Yorkshire Pottery, 1815–1820, £1,000 – Flemish sideboard, 1890, hand carved solid walnut (Juglans regia), £800 – glass paper weight decorated with myriad monkeys, goats, donkeys, and stuff, 1848, made by Cristallerie de Baccarat, £800 – Royal Caledonian Curling Club silver trophy (hot water jug) and Eve Muirhead (hot curler). Engraved scene 'after' Sir George Harvey (painter), made by 'Barnard Brothers of London' (Edward, Edward junior, John & William Barnard), in 1841. £3,000 – Russian impressionistic painting by Belarusian artist Alexander Komarov, 1956, £3,000 – McPherson clan 'broth spoon', property of Captain John McPherson, Army recruiting officer, 1790s – Threads, bobbin spinner and weaving machine, made of brass and ivory in mahogany box, owned by Mrs Mary Delany companion and Lady in Waiting to Queen Charlotte (and George III). Her needlework is exhibited in New York and the British Museum, £10,000 – 1930s Minnie Mouse by Margarete Steiff GmbH – £4,000, and Mickey Mouse made by 'The Dean's Company ' (Britain's Oldest Teddy Bear Company, founded in 1903), £300 – 1680 figurine of the Goddess of Mercy Guanyin, 'blondechin' porcelain (White of China), £5,000 – 1760s painting of boy by 'studio of' John James Masquerier, £6,000 – collection of miniatures – by John Smart the elder. Man (1765), £15,000; Lady (1770), £30,000 – glass novelty pipe, Yorkshire Glass, 1880, £200 – porcelain models of 1950s theatrical stars Paul Robeson, Laurence Olivier, Margot Fonteyn, John Gielgud, and Vivien Leigh. Designed and made by Susan Parkinson at Richard Parkinson Pottery Ltd., Brabourne Lees, Kent for the Briglin Pottery in London, founded by Brigitte Goldschmidt, £10,000 – 1920 painting of Edinburgh by Moonlight by William Crozier (Scottish artist) of The Edinburgh School, £3,000 – silver stag table lighter, made by George Lambert (Major George Lambert – Silversmith to the Queen by Royal warrant of appointment), 1888 £3,000 – 1930s Shōji Hamada pot, £1,000 – toy train set that belonged to John Stewart-Murray, 7th Duke of Atholl in c.1845, made by (CB) Buchna of Nurenburg, Germany, £35,000

==== Series 35 (2012–13) ====
Series 35: 25 editions from 7 October 2012 – 23 June 2013

- RAF Marham, Norfolk 1 (7 October 2012)
- Port Sunlight 1 (14 October 2012)
- Port Sunlight 2 (21 October 2012)
- Saint Andrews University 2 (28 October 2012)
- Grand Spa Hall, Scarborough 1 (4 November 2012)
- Wind Tunnels, Farnborough 1 (11 November 2012)
- Falmouth National Maritime Museum, Cornwall 1 (18 November 2012)
- Falmouth National Maritime Museum, Cornwall 2 (25 November 2012)
- Aberystwyth University 2 (2 December 2012)
- Wightwick Manor, near Wolverhampton 1 (9 December 2012)
- Christmas Special 2012 (23 December 2012)
- Fountains Abbey 1 (30 December 2012)
- Stowe House 1 (6 January 2013)
- Cawdor Castle, near Inverness, Scotland (13 January 2013)
- Chatham Historic Dockyard 1 (17 March 2013)
- Chatham Historic Dockyard 2 (24 March 2013)
- Newstead Abbey 1 (31 March 2013)
- Cheltenham Town Hall 1 (7 April 2013)
- Cheltenham Town Hall 2 (14 April 2013)
- Castle Coole, Enniskillen 2 (21 April 2013)
- Wind Tunnels, Farnborough 2 (28 April 2013)
- Chepstow Racecourse (5 May 2013)
- Stowe House 2 (19 May 2013)
- Grand Spa Hall, Scarborough 2 (16 June 2013)
- RAF Marham, Norfolk 2 (23 June 2013)

==== Series 36 (2013–14) ====
Series 36: 26 editions from 18 August 2013 – 20 July 2014

- Polesden Lacey, Surrey 1 (18 August 2013)
- Wightwick Manor, near Wolverhampton 2 (25 August 2013)
- Eastbourne Bandstand 1 (1 September 2013)
- Eastbourne Bandstand 2 (8 September 2013)
- Fountains Abbey 2 (15 September 2013)
- Royal Marines Museum, Southsea, Portsmouth 1 (22 September 2013)
- Royal Agricultural University, Cirencester 1 (29 September 2013)
- Newstead Abbey 2 (6 October 2013)
- Towneley Hall 1 (13 October 2013)
- Scottish National Gallery of Modern Art 1 (22 December 2013)
- Retrospective (29 December 2013; shown in Scotland on 16 February 2014)
- The Royal Ballet School, Richmond 1 (5 January 2014)
- Sainsbury Centre, Norwich 1 (12 January 2014)
- Exeter Cathedral 1 (23 March 2014)
- Scone Palace, near Perth, Scotland 1 (30 March 2014)
- World War I Special 1: filmed at the Thiepval Memorial to the Missing of the Somme, France (6 April 2014)
- Royal Agricultural University, Cirencester 2 (13 April 2014)
- Polesden Lacey, Surrey 2 (20 April 2014)
- Gregynog, Powys (27 April 2014)
- Royal Marines Museum, Southsea, Portsmouth 2 (4 May 2014)
- Exeter Cathedral 2 (11 May 2014)
- Scottish National Gallery of Modern Art 2 (25 May 2014)
- The Royal Ballet School, Richmond 2 (1 June 2014)
- Sainsbury Centre, Norwich 2 (22 June 2014)
- Wentworth Woodhouse 1 (29 June 2014)
- Wentworth Woodhouse 2 (20 July 2014)

==== Series 37 (2014–15) ====
Series 37: 27 editions from 14 September 2014 – 28 June 2015

- Hillsborough Castle 1 (14 September 2014)
- Kirby Hall 1 (21 September 2014)
- Kirby Hall 2 (28 September 2014)
- Scone Palace, near Perth, Scotland 2 (5 October 2014)
- Derby Roundhouse (12 October 2014)
- Chenies Manor 1 (19 October 2014)
- Chenies Manor 2 (26 October 2014)
- World War I Special 2: filmed at Somme Battlefields, France (2 November 2014)
- Tredegar House 1 (23 November 2014)
- Towneley Hall 2 (30 November 2014)
- Walthamstow Town Hall 1 (7 December 2014)
- Christmas Special: filmed at Tredegar House (21 December 2014)
- Durham Cathedral 1 (28 December 2014; not shown in Scotland until 6 January 2015, BBC2 repeat)
- Walthamstow Town Hall 2 (11 January 2015)
- Liverpool Metropolitan Cathedral 1 (22 March 2015)
- Liverpool Metropolitan Cathedral 2 (29 March 2015)
- Belton House 1 (5 April 2015)
- Belton House 2 (12 April 2015)
- Lowther Castle 1 (19 April 2015)
- Lowther Castle 2 (26 April 2015)
- Kelvingrove Art Gallery and Museum, Glasgow 1 (3 May 2015)
- Barrington Court 1 (17 May 2015)
- Barrington Court 2 (24 May 2015)
- Ashton Court 1 (31 May 2015)
- Scottish National Gallery of Modern Art 3 (14 June 2015)
- Tredegar House 2 (21 June 2015)
- Compilation: Ashton Court and Hillsborough Castle 2, unseen footage (28 June 2015)

==== Series 38 (2015–16) ====
Series 38: 26 editions (including Balmoral Royal Special) from 6 September 2015 – 15 May 2016

- Plas Newydd 1 (6 September 2015)
- Compilation: Balmoral Royal Special (13 September 2015)
- RAF Coningsby 1 (20 September 2015)
- Broughton Castle 1 (27 September 2015)
- Durham Cathedral 2 (4 October 2015)
- The Royal William Yard 1 (11 October 2015)
- The Royal William Yard 2 (18 October 2015)
- Bolsover Castle 1 (25 October 2015)
- Bolsover Castle 2 (1 November 2015)
- RAF Coningsby 2 (8 November 2015)
- Walmer Castle 1 (15 November 2015)
- Walmer Castle 2 (22 November 2015)
- Plas Newydd 2 (29 November 2015)
- Balmoral 1 (6 December 2015)
- Balmoral 2 (13 December 2015)
- Christmas Special: Lyme Park 1 (30 December 2015)
- Bowood House 1 (3 January 2016)
- Bowood House 2 (10 January 2016)
- India Special: Filmed in BAPS Shri Swaminarayan Mandir (Neasden Temple) in London (13 March 2016)
- The Royal Hall, Harrogate 1 (27 March 2016)
- The Royal Hall, Harrogate 2 (3 April 2016)
- Kelvingrove Art Gallery and Museum, Glasgow 2 (10 April 2016)
- Hanbury Hall 1 (17 April 2016)
- Trentham Gardens 1 (24 April 2016; shown on BBC2 in Northern Ireland)
- Lyme Park 2 (1 May 2016)
- Trentham Gardens 2 (15 May 2016)

==== Series 39 (2016–17) ====
Series 39: 27 editions (including the Golden Age of Travel, Highlights of 2016, and Holocaust Memorial specials) from 28 August 2016 – 2 July 2017

- Tewkesbury Abbey 1 (28 August 2016)
- Audley End, Essex 1 (4 September 2016)
- Audley End, Essex 2 (11 September 2016)
- Hanbury Hall 2 (18 September 2016)
- Arley Hall 1 (25 September 2016)
- Arley Hall 2 (2 October 2016)
- Broughton Castle 2 (9 October 2016)
- Baddesley Clinton 1 (16 October 2016)
- Baddesley Clinton 2 (23 October 2016)
- Special: Golden Age of Travel, filmed aboard the famous locomotive, Flying Scotsman (30 October 2016)
- Special: Highlights of 2016 (28 December 2016)
- Tewkesbury Abbey 2 (8 January 2017)
- Special: Holocaust Memorial, filmed in the Foreign and Commonwealth Office (15 January 2017)
- Burton Constable Hall 1 (19 March 2017; shown on BBC Two in Northern Ireland)
- Burton Constable Hall 2 (26 March 2017; shown on BBC Two in Northern Ireland)
- BBC Caversham, near Reading 1 (2 April 2017)
- Pembroke Castle 1 (9 April 2017)
- Pembroke Castle 2 (16 April 2017)
- Senate House, London 1 (23 April 2017)
- Trelissick, Cornwall 1 (30 April 2017)
- Ightham Mote 1 (7 May 2017)
- Ightham Mote 2 (21 May 2017; shown in Scotland on 16 July 2017)
- New Lanark Cotton Mills 1 (28 May 2017)
- New Lanark Cotton Mills 2 (11 June 2017)
- BBC Caversham, near Reading 2 (18 June 2017)
- Holker Hall 1 (25 June 2017)
- Compilation: Unscreened Gems (2 July 2017)

==== Series 40 (2017–19) ====
Series 40: 26 editions, including Pioneering Women, from 24 September 2017 – 30 September 2018

- Castle Howard 1 (24 September 2017)
- Minehead Railway Station 1 (1 October 2017)
- Nymans 1 (8 October 2017)
- Nymans 2 (15 October 2017)
- Senate House, London 2 (22 October 2017)
- Entertainment Special: Filmed on the EastEnders set for Albert Square in Elstree (31 December 2017)
- Black Country Living Museum 1 (15 April 2018)
- Castle Howard 2 (22 April 2018)
- Floors Castle, Scotland 1 (29 April 2018)
- Helmingham Hall 1 (6 May 2018)
- Black Country Living Museum 2 (20 May 2018)
- Coronation Special: Filmed from Royal Yacht Britannia in Edinburgh (28 May 2018)
- Helmingham Hall 2 (3 June 2018)
- Special: Pioneering Women, filmed in the Houses of Parliament, London (10 June 2018)
- Newcastle Civic Centre 1 (17 June 2018)
- Osborne House, Isle of Wight 1 (24 June 2018)
- Floors Castle, Scotland 2 (1 July 2018)
- Cardiff Castle 1 (8 July 2018)
- Minehead Railway Station 2 (15 July 2018)
- Cardiff Castle 2 (22 July 2018)
- Stormont Parliament Buildings and Estate 1 (29 July 2018)
- Trelissick 2 (5 August 2018)
- Helmingham Hall 3 (19 August 2018)
- Abbey Pumping Station 1 (16 September 2018)
- Stormont Parliament Buildings and Estate 2 (23 September 2018)
- Abbey Pumping Station 2 (30 September 2018)

==== Series 41 (2019) ====
Series 41: 24 editions from 4 November 2018 – 23 June 2019

- Special: World War I, filmed at the Étaples Military Cemetery (4 November 2018)
- Compilation 1: The Past 40 Years (30 December 2018)
- Eltham Palace 1 (6 January 2019)
- Erddig 1 (13 January 2019)
- Crathes Castle 1 (20 January 2019)
- Cromer Pier (1) (3 February 2019)
- Buckfast Abbey 1 (10 February 2019)
- Aerospace Bristol 1 (24 February 2019)
- Piece Hall 1 (3 March 2019)
- Wrest Park 1 (10 March 2019)
- MediaCityUK 1 (17 March 2019)
- Eltham Palace 2 (24 March 2019)
- Crathes Castle 2 (31 March 2019)
- Aerospace Bristol 2 (7 April 2019)
- Erddig 2 (14 April 2019; not shown in Northern Ireland)
- Buckfast Abbey 2 (21 April 2019)
- Piece Hall 2 (28 April 2019)
- Newcastle Civic Centre 2 (5 May 2019)
- Wrest Park 2 (19 May 2019)
- Osborne House, Isle of Wight 2 (26 May 2019)
- MediaCityUK 2 (2 June 2019)
- Cromer Pier 1 (2) (9 June 2019)
- Eltham Palace 3 (16 June 2019)
- Compilation 2 (23 June 2019)

==== Series 42 (2019–20) ====
Series 42: 25 editions (including 8 specials) from 1 September 2019 – 27 December 2020

- Morden Hall Park 1 (1 September 2019)
- Special: World War II 1, filmed at Dover Castle (8 September 2019)
- Salisbury Cathedral 1 (15 September 2019)
- V&A Dundee, Design Museum 1 (22 September 2019)
- Lytham Hall 1 (29 September 2019)
- Compton Verney 1 (6 October 2019)
- Morden Hall Park 2 (13 October 2019)
- Battle Abbey 1 (20 October 2019)
- Castle Ward 1 (27 October 2019)
- Special: What Happened Next 1, filmed at Strawberry Hill House (29 December 2019)
- Battle Abbey 2 (1 March 2020)
- Salisbury Cathedral 2 (8 March 2020)
- V&A Dundee, Design Museum 2 (15 March 2020)
- National Botanic Garden of Wales 1 (22 March 2020)
- Morden Hall Park 3 (29 March 2020)
- Lytham Hall 2 (5 April 2020)
- Compton Verney 2 (12 April 2020)
- Castle Ward 2 (26 April 2020)
- National Botanic Garden of Wales 2 (3 May 2020)
- Special Compilation: VE Day, including unseen items (10 May 2020)
- Special: The Best of the Summer 1 (6 September 2020)
- Special: The Battle of Britain and the Blitz, filmed at Biggin Hill Airfield (13 September 2020)
- Special: The Best of the Summer 2 (27 September 2020)
- Special: The Best of the Summer 3 (18 October 2020)
- Special: What Happened Next 2, filmed at Pinewood Studios (27 December 2020)

==== Series 43 (2021) ====
Series 43: 18 editions (including World War II special) from 3 January 2021 – 18 July 2021

- Forty Hall 1 (3 January 2021)
- Christchurch Mansion 1 (17 January 2021)
- Newby Hall 1 (31 January 2021)
- Culzean Castle 1 (7 February 2021)
- Bodnant Garden 1 (14 February 2021)
- Windermere Jetty 1 (21 February 2021)
- Stonor Park 1 (28 February 2021)
- Kenilworth Castle 1 (7 March 2021)
- Forty Hall 2 (14 March 2021)
- Christchurch Mansion 2 (28 March 2021)
- Culzean Castle 2 (4 April 2021)
- Newby Hall 2 (18 April 2021)
- Bodnant Garden 2 (25 April 2021)
- Special: World War II - The Aftermath, filmed at Coventry Cathedral (2 May 2021)
- Windermere Jetty 2 (9 May 2021; 12 May 2021 in Scotland)
- Stonor Park 2 (16 May 2021)
- Forty Hall 3 (23 May 2021)
- Kenilworth Castle 2 (18 July 2021)

==== Series 44 (2021–22) ====
Series 44: 20 editions (including Christmas special) from 12 September 2021 – 28 August 2022

- Ham House 1 (12 September 2021)
- Dyffryn Gardens 1 (19 September 2021)
- Royal Botanic Garden Edinburgh 1 (26 September 2021)
- Aston Hall 1 (7 November 2021)
- Christmas Special (19 December 2021)
- Portchester 1 (13 February 2022; shown on BBC2 in Northern Ireland)
- Ulster Folk Museum 1 (20 February 2022)
- Woodhorn Museum 1 (27 February 2022)
- Ham House 2 (6 March 2022)
- Bishop's Palace 1 (27 March 2022)
- Royal Botanic Garden Edinburgh 2 (3 April 2022)
- Aston Hall 2 (10 April 2022)
- Dyffryn Gardens 2 (24 April 2022)
- Ulster Folk Museum 2 (1 May 2022)
- Woodhorn Museum 2 (8 May 2022)
- Portchester 2 (15 May 2022)
- Royal Botanic Garden Edinburgh 3 (22 May 2022)
- Bishop's Palace 2 (14 August 2022)
- Ham House 3 (21 August 2022)
- Ulster Folk Museum 3 (28 August 2022)

==== Series 45 (2022–23) ====
Series 45: 22 editions (including 4 specials) from 4 September 2022 – 2 July 2023

- Wollaton Hall 1 (4 September 2022)
- Sefton Park Palm House 1 (25 September 2022)
- Brodie Castle & Estate, Moray 1 (2 October 2022)
- Clissold Park 1 (9 October 2022)
- Brodie Castle & Estate, Moray 2 (16 October 2022)
- Special: 100 Years of the BBC, filmed at Alexandra Palace (23 October 2022)
- Wollaton Hall 2 (30 October 2022)
- Special: Toys and Childhood, filmed at Museum of the Home with guest star Jonathan Ross (29 December 2022)
- Special: Nursing, filmed at the St Thomas' and St Bartholomew's hospitals in London (26 February 2023)
- Eden Project 1 (5 March 2023)
- Belmont House 1 (12 March 2023)
- Clissold Park 2 (19 March 2023)
- Sefton Park Palm House 2 (26 March 2023)
- Powis Castle and Gardens 1 (2 April 2023)
- Brodie Castle & Estate, Moray 3 (9 April 2023)
- Special: Royal Treasures, filmed at Fulham Palace and Westminster Abbey (7 May 2023)
- Belmont House 2 (21 May 2023)
- Powis Castle and Gardens 2 (28 May 2023)
- Clissold Park 3 (4 June 2023)
- Eden Project 2 (11 June 2023)
- Sefton Park Palm House 3 (18 June 2023)
- Powis Castle and Gardens 3 (2 July 2023)

==== Series 46 (2023–24) ====
Series 46: 20 editions (including the At Christmas special) from 3 September 2023 – 2 June 2024

- Swanage Pier and Seafront 1 (3 September 2023)
- Crystal Palace Park 1 (10 September 2023)
- Pollok Park 1 (17 September 2023)
- Swanage Pier and Seafront 2 (24 September 2023)
- Roundhay Park, Leeds 1 (1 October 2023)
- Alexandra Gardens, Cardiff 1 (8 October 2023)
- Crystal Palace Park 2 (15 October 2023)
- Ebrington Square, Derry 1 (22 October 2023)
- Special: At Christmas, filmed at Uppark House (24 December 2023)
- Roundhay Park, Leeds 2 (31 December 2023)
- Pollok Park 2 (7 January 2024)
- Alexandra Gardens, Cardiff 2 (14 January 2024)
- Ebrington Square, Derry 2 (21 January 2024)
- Crystal Palace Park 3 (28 January 2024)
- Roundhay Park, Leeds 3 (4 February 2024)
- Pollok Park 3 (11 February 2024)
- Ebrington Square, Derry 3 (17 March 2024)
- Swanage Pier and Seafront 3 (24 March 2024)
- Alexandra Gardens, Cardiff 3 (31 March 2024)
- Special: D-Day, filmed at the D-Day Museum in Portsmouth and Normandy, France

==== Series 47 (2024–25) ====
Series 47: 17~ Editions from 25 August 2024 – Unknown Date

- Pitzhanger Manor and Gallery 1 (25 August 2024)
- Cromford Mills, Derbyshire 1 (1 September 2024)
- Firstsite 1 (8 September 2024)
- Pitzhanger Manor and Gallery 3 (15 September 2024)
- Thirlestane Castle 1 (22 September 2024)
- Cromford Mills 2 (20 October 2024)
- Pitzhanger Manor and Gallery 2 (27 October 2024)
- Thirlestane Castle 2 (3 November 2024)
- Beaumaris Castle 1 (10 November 2024)
- Firstsite 2 (17 November 2024)
- Botanic Gardens, Belfast 1 (24 November 2024)
- Cromford Mills 3 (1 December 2024)
- Beaumaris Castle 2 (8 December 2024)
- Botanic Gardens, Belfast 2 (15 December 2024)
- Special: Antiques Roadshow at Christmas, filmed at Anglesey Abbey (22 December 2024)
- Special: A History of Food, with guest star Dame Mary Berry (29 December 2024)
- Firstsite 3 (5 January 2025)
- Thirlestane Castle 3 (27 April 2025)
- Beaumaris Castle 3 (18 May 2025)
- Botanic Gardens, Belfast 3 (25 May 2025)

==== Series 48 (2025-26) ====
Series 48: 5 May 2025 - Present

- Special: VE Day, Berlin and Bletchley Park (5 May 2025)

Announced Locations and Dates for Series 48

- Shuttleworth House, Old Warden, Bedfordshire (18 May 2025)
- Stephens House and Gardens, Finchley, North London (1 June 2025)
- Lister Park and Cartwright Hall, Bradford, West Yorkshire (15 June 2025)
- Hill of Tarvit, Mansion and Garden, Fife (8 July 2025)
- National Waterfront Museum, Swansea (20 July 2025)

=== Specials ===
- Antiques Roadshow: The First Ten Years (20 December 1987)
- Antiques Roadshow: Going Live! (26 December 1991)
- Antiques Roadshow: The Next Generation (12 editions, broadcast 27 December 1992 – 29 December 2006)
- Antiques Roadshow: Fifteen Priceless Years (28 March 1993)
- Antiques Roadshow: Junior Roadshow (13 August 1993)
- Antiques Roadshow: Unwrapped – 21st Anniversary (20 December 1998) – Jill Dando introduces a special edition to celebrate the programme's 21st anniversary
- Antiques Roadshow: 25 Years On! (1 September 2002)
- Antiques Roadshow: Greatest Finds (3 editions, broadcast 3 – 17 September 2006)
- Antiques Roadshow: Farewell To Michael Aspel (30 March 2008)
- Priceless Antiques Roadshow Series 1 (15 editions, broadcast 9 – 27 March 2009)
- Priceless Antiques Roadshow Series 2 (20 editions, broadcast 1 – 26 February 2010)
- Restoration Roadshow (20 editions, broadcast 9 August – 3 September 2010; presented by Eric Knowles)
- Shakespeare Special (29 April 2012)
- Diamond Jubilee Special (10 June 2012)
- Antiques Roadshow Detectives (15 editions, broadcast 6–24 April 2015) – a series of programmes looking at some of the stories behind featured objects in more detail
- Balmoral Royal Special (13 September 2015)
- Golden Age of Travel Special (30 October 2016) – a look at items from the golden age of rail, air and sea including the world's most famous steam locomotive 60103 Flying Scotsman
- Highlights of 2016 (28 December 2016)
- Holocaust Memorial (15 January 2017)
- Pioneering Women Special (10 June 2018)
- World War I Special (4 November 2018)
- Compilation 1 (31 December 2018)
- Compilation 2 (23 June 2019)
- Second World War Special (8 September 2019)
- What Happened Next (29 December 2019)
- VE Day Special (10 May 2020)
- The Best of the Summer (6 September 2020)
- The Battle of Britain and the Blitz (13 September 2020)
- The Best of the Summer, part 2 (27 September 2020)
- The Best of the Summer, part 3 (18 October 2020)
- What Happened Next (27 December 2020)
- World War II – The Aftermath (2 May 2021)
- Christmas Special (19 December 2021)
- 100 Years of the BBC (23 October 2022)
- Toys & Childhood Special (29 December 2022) – a look at the best-loved toys of the past 100 years, featuring Jonathan Ross and shot at Museum of the Home in Hoxton
- Nursing Special (26 February 2023)
- Royal Treasures (7 May 2023)
- At Christmas (24 December 2023)
- D-Day (2 June 2024)
- Antiques Roadshow at Christmas (22 December 2024, Series 47)
- A History of Food (29 December 2024, Series 47)
