= Martin Miller =

Martin Miller may refer to:

- Martin Miller (actor) (1899–1969), Czech actor
- Martin Miller (cricketer, born 1940) (1940–2016), English cricketer
- Martin Miller (cricketer, born 1972), English cricketer
- Martin Miller (footballer) (born 1997), Estonian footballer
- Martin A. Miller, American historian of modern Russia
- Martin M. Miller (1888–1974), member of the Mississippi House of Representatives
- Martin Miller (antiquarian) (1946–2013), British antiquarian

== See also ==
- Johann Martin Miller (1750–1814), German theologian and writer
- Martin Millar (disambiguation)
- Miller (name), a surname of English and Scottish origin
- Martin Milner (1931–2015), American actor
