= Susan Parkinson =

English potter (1925–2012)

- Born: Susan Elizabeth Sanderson; 8 January 1925; Calcutta, British India
- Died: 15 October 2012 (aged 87)
- Education: Royal College of Art
- Known for: Pottery
- Spouse: Richard Parkinson

Susan Parkinson (8 January 1925 – 15 October 2012) is best known as an English potter and for her work with the Arts Dyslexia Trust.

== Early life and education ==
She was born Susan Elizabeth Sanderson in Calcutta (Kolkata). Her father was a wine merchant with an interest in sport and natural history, while her mother was proficient in dress making and craft works. Parkinson and her elder sister Diana were brought to England and pursued their schooling at Maltman's Green School, Gerrard's Cross. At Maltman's, she became good friends with Sylvia Priestly, and the two were given their own studio in one of the school turrets.

Parkinson completed her education at the Royal College of Art, where she studied under Frank Dobson and John Skeaping. She won fourth year scholarship and the RCA Life Drawing Prize, the first time this had ever been won by a Sculpture School student.

== Career ==
After her marriage to Richard Parkinson (1927–1985) and a summer working for Harry Davis at the Crowan Pottery, Cornwall, Parkinson and Richard set up Richard Parkinson Ltd., generally referred to as the "Parkinson Pottery". In the stables and oast house of the home at Brabourne Lees, Kent, Richard's primary role was to provide the physical and technical resources, the materials and the workshop facilities, to support Parkinson's creative talents in designing and decorating the company's distinctive pottery ware.

Slipcasting in porcelain was the technique used to reproduce Parkinson's sculptures for a mass market. Output ranged from animals (including mice, cats, dogs, sheep, pigs, birds, fish and mythological creatures) to humans (including schoolchildren, judicial figures and classical busts) together with more practical tableware (throwing or moulding primarily by Richard). Highly stylised, distorted, flattened or elongated forms were finished with Parkinson's monochromatic graphic designs achieved with wax resist techniques, brown and later green-black pigments and gloss or matt glazes. At its peak, there were several assistants, production took place around the clock and Parkinson Pottery was being sold not only in British department stores such as Heal's, Liberty, and Dunns of Bromley but across the Atlantic in America.

A series of models of contemporary actors designed and made for the Briglin Pottery featured in a 2011 broadcast of the Antiques Roadshow and can also be seen on the Victoria and Albert Museum web site. One of Parkinson's final pieces of pottery was a bust of Winston Churchill, who personally approved reproduction of the design.

In the early 1960s, a combination of the tragic accidental death of the Parkinsons' talented young model maker and the extreme physical exhaustion involved in running the Pottery lead to financial difficulties and the break up of both the company and the marriage. Although some of the moulds were sold to George Gray at the Cinque Ports Pottery, an officer from HM Customs and Excise insisted on the destruction of stock and moulds in an adjacent field to ensure no further income could be made.

=== Designing and teaching ===
Teaching life drawing and sculpture at Maidstone School of Art, Parkinson accepted several design commissions including film animation (for John Ryan on Captain Pugwash), portraiture, model making, and graphics before taking up a teaching post at Brickwall House, Northiam (now Frewen College). In over twenty years in charge of art at the school, she was able to develop her theories on the connection between dyslexia and above average gifts of visual-spatial ability.

=== Artist Dyslexia Trust (ADT) ===
Upon retiring from teaching in 1985, Parkinson worked on an Open University degree before setting up the Arts Dyslexia Trust as a registered charity with two other members of the Brickwall teaching staff. In 1994, after a trial ADT exhibition at Carmel College, Oxfordshire, she organised the first major exhibition of work by artists with dyslexia at the Mall Galleries, London. Parkinson became Registered Secretary and CEO of the Trust and for 25 years, the ADT has pursued its objectives through research and education in "focusing on the visual-spatial abilities as demonstrated in the work of talented dyslexics". The Gallery on the ADT web site is a testament to the success of Parkinson Parkinson and her colleagues.

=== Later life ===
An article in Crafts, the Crafts Council magazine in 2001 brought Parkinson's ceramic work to new audiences. In 2004, an exhibition of her designs at the Gary Grant Gallery, London coincided with the publication of the book Parkinson Parkinson and the Richard Parkinson Pottery by Carol Cashmore and Tim Smith-Vincent. Cataract operations in 2011 were successful, but the eyesight problems meant that Parkinson had to give up driving. As her mobility became more restricted, Parkinson's living room became the hub of ADT activities.

== Personal life ==
A fall at home and a brief period in hospital, Parkinson died on 15 October 2012.
