= Antiques Roadshow (series 31) =

2008-9 television season

Antiques Roadshow is a British television series produced by the BBC since 1979. Series 31 (2008/09) comprised 26 editions that were broadcast by the BBC from 7 September 2008 – 12 April 2009

The dates in brackets given below are the dates each episode was filmed at the location. The date not in brackets is the episode's first UK airing date on BBC One.

== Series 31 (2008/09) ==
1. Bolton Abbey, near Skipton, North Yorkshire, 7 September 2008 (29 May 2008)
2. Althorp Part 1, near Northampton, Northamptonshire, 14 September 2008 (22 May 2008)
3. Chester Cathedral Part 1, Chester, Cheshire, 21 September 2008 (3 April 2008)
4. Chester Cathedral Part 2, Chester, Cheshire, 28 September 2008 (3 April 2008)
5. Compilation 1, The Pavilion, Ascot Racecourse, Berkshire, and Althorp Part 2, 5 October 2008 (26 April & 22 May 2008)
6. Lanhydrock Part 1, near Bodmin, Cornwall, 12 October 2008 (12 June 2008)
7. Southwell Minster Part 1, Southwell, Nottinghamshire, 19 October 2008 (15 May 2008)
8. Southwell Minster Part 2, Southwell, Nottinghamshire, 26 October 2008 (15 May 2008)
9. Leeds Castle Part 1, near Maidstone, Kent, 2 November 2008 (3 July 2008)
10. Leeds Castle Part 2, near Maidstone, Kent, 9 November 2008 (3 July 2008)
11. The Sage Gateshead, St Mary's Square, Gateshead, Tyne & Wear, 16 November 2008 (31 August 2008)
12. Bodnant Garden Part 1, Tal-y-Cafn, near Colwyn Bay, Wales, 23 November 2008 (11 September 2008)
13. Compilation 2, Lanhydrock Part 2, near Bodmin, Cornwall and Bodnant Garden Part 2, Tal-y-Cafn, near Colwyn Bay, Wales, 30 November 2008 (12 June & 11 September 2008)
14. Hertford College, Oxford, Oxfordshire, 7 December 2008 (28 June 2008)
15. Dumfries House, Cumnock, Ayrshire, 21 December 2008 (10 July 2008)
16. Bridlington Spa Royal Hall Part 1, Bridlington, East Riding of Yorkshire, 28 December 2008 (16 October 2008)
17. RMS Titanic Drawing Offices Part 1, the former Harland and Wolff offices, Queens Road, Belfast, Northern Ireland, 4 January 2009 (13 April 2008)
18. Titanic Drawing Offices Part 2, the former Harland and Wolff offices, Queens Road, Belfast, Northern Ireland, 11 January 2009 (13 April 2008)
19. Bishop's Palace Part 1, Wells, Somerset, 18 January 2009 (18 September 2008)
20. Bishop's Palace Part 2, Wells, Somerset, 25 January 2009 (18 September 2008)
21. Caird Hall, City Square, Dundee, 1 February 2009 (4 September 2008)
22. Dulwich Picture Gallery Part 1, Dulwich, London, 8 February 2009 (19 June 2008)
23. Dulwich Picture Gallery Part 2, Dulwich, London, 15 February 2009 (19 June 2008)
24. Bridlington Spa Royal Hall Part 2, Bridlington, East Riding of Yorkshire, 29 March 2009 (16 October 2008)
25. Oxburgh Hall, near King's Lynn, Norfolk, 5 April 2009 (17 July 2008)
26. Retrospective (favourite moments and item updates from this series), 12 April 2009
