= Saltaire gymnastics club =

Gymnastics club in West Yorkshire, England

Saltaire Gymnastics Club was set up in 1929 and ran sessions from Victoria Hall in Saltaire, West Yorkshire, England. During the 1940s several of the gymnasts represented Great Britain in the Olympic Games.

In the 1980s the club moved to Windhill and changed to the discipline of Sports Acrobatics in which they continue to train and compete based at Baildon C of E Primary School near Shipley. In recent years the club has had many gymnasts represent Yorkshire at the British Finals and has produced several British champions.
