= Judith Miller (antiques expert) =

British antiques expert, writer, and broadcaster (1951–2023)

- Born: Judith Henderson Cairns; 16 September 1951; Galashiels, Scotland
- Died: 8 April 2023 (aged 71); London, England
- Occupations: Antiques expert, author, broadcaster
- Spouses: Martin Miller (m. 1978; div. 1992); John Wainwright (m. 2015)
- Children: 3

Judith Henderson Miller (née Cairns; 16 September 1951 – 8 April 2023) was a Scottish antiques expert, writer, and broadcaster.

== Early career ==
Born Judith Henderson Cairns in Galashiels, Scotland, Miller first began collecting antiques while studying history at the University of Edinburgh. In 1979, she co-wrote the Miller's Antiques Price Guide with her first husband, Martin Miller, whom she had married the year before, and had two children with.

== Television presenter ==
Miller worked as a consultant to and co-presenter of eight series of The Antiques Trail (Meridian, HTV and Discovery), run on ITV. She had also presented It's Your Bid for the Discovery Channel. She was a regular expert on the BBC's Antiques Roadshow, and also appeared on Priceless Antiques Roadshow.

Miller co-presented The House Detectives on BBC Two.

== Journalism and lecturer ==
Miller was a regular contributor to newspapers and magazines including BBC Homes & Antiques, where she wrote a four-page feature on "Starting a Collection". She also wrote the antiques column for The Scotsman magazine and a monthly feature for the Financial Times weekend supplement "House and Home". She was the antiques and collecting columnist for The Daily Telegraph. Miller was also the antiques agony aunt with Antiques and Collectables magazine. She wrote a monthly feature in Canadian Home and Country magazine and was a regular contributor to US Traditional Home and Country Living.

Miller also regularly lectured at the Victoria and Albert Museum in London and the Smithsonian.

== Publishing and select bibliography ==
In 2001, Miller embarked on a joint venture with Dorling Kindersley to publish two full-colour annual price guides to antiques and collectables, a series of specialist collectors guides and price guides beginning with costume jewellery. In 2007 she returned to Miller's, an imprint of Octopus Books (a division of Hachette Livre).

== Personal life and death ==
After her marriage to Martin Miller ended in divorce in 1992, Miller began a relationship with John Wainwright, and they had one son. The family lived in North London as of 2004. Miller and Wainwright married in 2015.

Miller died at a hospital in North London on 8 April 2023, at the age of 71.

== Bibliography ==
Miller published more than 100 books on antiques and interiors, including:

- Co-founder Miller's Antiques Price Guide (first edition 1979)
- Miller's Collectables Price Guide (first edition 1989)
- Classic Style (Mitchell Beazley), ISBN 978-1-84000-050-4
- Country Finishes and Effects (Mitchell Beazley), ISBN 978-1-85732-888-2
- Country Style (Mitchell Beazley), ISBN 978-1-85732-465-5
- Miller's How to Make Money out of Antiques, ISBN 978-1-85732-584-3
- Miller's Antiques and Collectables
- Miller's Antiques Checklists – 12 titles
- Miller's Antiques Encyclopedia, ISBN 978-1-84533-433-8
- Miller's Pine and Country Furniture Buyer's Guide, ISBN 978-1-84000-374-1
- Miller's Understanding Antiques, ISBN 978-1-85732-857-8
- Period Details (Mitchell Beazley), ISBN 978-1-85732-043-5
- Period Details Sourcebook (Mitchell Beazley), ISBN 978-1-84000-137-2
- Period Paint Finishes (Mitchell Beazley)
- Period Style (Mitchell Beazley), ISBN 978-0-85533-731-5
- Period-style Soft Furnishings (Mitchell Beazley), ISBN 978-1-85732-792-2
- The Style Source Book (Mitchell Beazley)
- Victorian Style (Mitchell Beazley), ISBN 978-1-85732-955-1
- Wooden Houses (Ryland Peters & Small), ISBN 978-1-84172-175-0
- Victoriana, ISBN 978-0-905879-06-2
- Miller's Pocket Antiques Factfile, ISBN 978-0-670-82059-7
- Period Finishes and Effects (Mitchell Beazley), ISBN 978-0-8478-1569-2
- Miller's Classic Motorcycles Price Guide (Mick Walker), ISBN 978-1-84000-962-0
- More Period Details: The House Renovator's Bible (Mitchell Beazley), ISBN 978-0-609-60410-6
- Care & Repair of Antiques & Collectables (Mitchell Beazley), ISBN 978-1-84533-418-5
- Great Escapes (Ryland, Peters & Small), ISBN 978-1-84172-000-5
- Judith Miller's Guide to Period-Style Curtains and Soft Furnishings (Mitchell Beazley), ISBN 978-1-58567-054-3
- A Closer Look at Antiques (Marshall Publishing), ISBN 978-0-8212-2734-3
- Colour (Marshall Publishing), 978-1840282917
- The Illustrated Dictionary of Antiques and Collectables (Marshall Publishing), ISBN 978-1-84028-337-2
- The Antiques Hunter's Guide to Europe (Marshall Publishing), ISBN 978-1-84028-334-1
- BBC Antiques Roadshow Antiques Price Guide 2008 (30th Anniversary Edition), ISBN 978-1-4053-2543-1
- Dorling Kindersley Antiques Price Guide US 2003–2008 (annual)
- Dorling Kindersley Collectables Price Guide UK 2003–2008 (annual)
- Dorling Kindersley Collectibles Price Guide US 2003–2008 (annual)
- Dorling Kindersley German Antiques Price Guide 2004–2005 & 2006–2007
- Grund French Antiques Price Guide 2004–2008 (annual)
- Dorling Kindersley Collectors Guide to Costume Jewellery, ISBN 978-1405318129
- Dorling Kindersley Collectors Guide to Art Nouveau, ISBN 978-1-4053-0251-7
- Dorling Kindersley Collectors Guide to Art Deco, ISBN 978-1-4053-0754-3
- Dorling Kindersley Collectors Guide to Arts & Crafts, ISBN 978-1-4053-0882-3
- Dorling Kindersley Collectors Guide to 20thC Glass, ISBN 978-1-4053-0592-1
- Dorling Kindersley Collectors Guide to Tribal Art, ISBN 978-1-4053-1289-9
- Inspired Interiors, Jacqui Small Editions, Aurum Press, ISBN 978-1-903221-55-6
- Reader's Digest Buy Keep or Sell, ISBN 978-1-4053-4514-9
- Dorling Kindersley Encyclopedia of Furniture, ISBN 978-0-13-243642-7
- Dorling Kindersley Encyclopedia of Decorative Arts, ISBN 978-1-4053-1290-5
- Dorling Kindersley Collectors Pocket Book: Handbags, ISBN 978-0-7566-1920-6
- Dorling Kindersley Collectors Pocket Book: Metal Toys, ISBN 978-1-4053-0624-9
- Dorling Kindersley Collectors Pocket Book: Perfume Bottles, ISBN 978-1-4053-0625-6
- Dorling Kindersley Collectors Pocket Book: The Sixties, ISBN 978-1-4053-0628-7
- "Modern Country or Country by Jacqui Small Editions", Aurum Press
- Dorling Kindersley The Antiques Detective, ISBN 978-1-4053-4196-7
- Dorling Kindersley BBC Antiques Roadshow A-Z of Antiques and Collectables, ISBN 978-1-4053-1765-8
- Miller's Antiques Price Guide 2009, ISBN 978-1-84533-313-3
- Miller's Collectables Price Guide 2009, ISBN 978-1-84533-442-0
- Miller's Fact Book, ISBN 978-1-84533-430-7
- Miller's Shoes, ISBN 978-1-84533-475-8
- Miller's Watches, ISBN 978-1-84533-476-5
- Chairs, ISBN 978-1-84091-523-5
- 20th Century Design, ISBN 978-1-84533-513-7
- Miller's Collectables Handbook 2010–2011, ISBN 978-1-84533-514-4
- Miller's Antiques Handbook & Price Guide 2010–2011, ISBN 978-1-84533-515-1
