= Martin Millar (disambiguation) =

Martin Millar (born 1959) is a Scottish writer.

Martin Millar may also refer to:

- Martin Millar (Doctors)
- Martin Millar (sport shooter) (born 1960), Northern Irish sport shooter

== See also ==
- Martin Miller (disambiguation)
