= Van T. Barfoot =

United States Army Medal of Honor recipient (1919–2012)

Van Thomas Barfoot
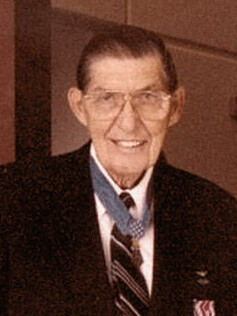
- Van T. Barfoot, Medal of Honor recipient
- Born: Van Thurman Barfoot; June 15, 1919; Edinburg, Mississippi, U.S.
- Died: March 2, 2012 (aged 92); Richmond, Virginia, U.S.
- Burial place: H. C. Smither Memorial Cemetery, Hudgins, Virginia
- Military career
- Allegiance: United States of America
- Branch: United States Army
- Service years: 1940–1974
- Rank: Colonel
- Units: 3rd Battalion, 157th Infantry Regiment, 45th Infantry Division
- Conflicts: World War II; Italian Campaign; Allied invasion of Sicily; Allied invasion of Italy; Battle of Salerno; Battle of Anzio; Korean War; Vietnam War
- Awards: Medal of Honor; Silver Star; Legion of Merit (2); Bronze Star; Purple Heart (3)

Van Thomas Barfoot (born Van Thurman Barfoot; June 15, 1919 – March 2, 2012) was a United States Army officer and a recipient of the United States military's highest decoration, the Medal of Honor, for his actions in World War II.

== Early life ==
Barfoot was born on June 15, 1919, in Edinburg, Mississippi. His parents were Simon and Martha Barfoot. His maternal grandmother was Choctaw, but Barfoot himself was not a citizen of any Choctaw tribe; although he was eligible to become an enrolled citizen of a Choctaw tribe, his parents never did so.

== Military career ==
After enlisting in the Army from Carthage, Mississippi, in 1940 and completing his training, Barfoot served with the 1st Infantry Division in Louisiana and Puerto Rico. In December 1941, he was promoted to sergeant and reassigned to the Headquarters Amphibious Force Atlantic Fleet in Quantico, Virginia, where he served until the unit was deactivated in 1943. He next joined the 157th Infantry Regiment, 45th Infantry Division ("Thunderbird"), and was shipped to Europe.

=== World War II ===
During the Italian Campaign Barfoot participated in a series of amphibious landings: the Allied invasion of Sicily in July 1943, the invasion of mainland Italy at Salerno in September 1943, and finally the landings at Anzio in late January 1944. His unit pushed inland from Anzio, and by May 1944 had reached the small town of Carano in southern Italy, in the province of Latina. They set up defensive positions and Barfoot conducted patrols to scout the German lines. When his company was ordered to attack on the morning of May 23, 1944, Barfoot, now a technical sergeant, asked for permission to lead a squad. Because of the patrols he had made, he knew the terrain and the layout of the minefield which was in front of the German position. He advanced alone through the minefield, following ditches and depressions, until he came within a few yards of a machine gun nest on the German flank. After taking out the gun and its crew with a hand grenade, he entered the German trench and advanced on a second machine gun, killing two soldiers and capturing three others. When he reached a third machine gun, the entire crew surrendered to him. Others also surrendered, and Barfoot captured a total of seventeen German soldiers and killed eight.

When the Germans launched an armored counterattack with three Tiger tanks directly against his positions later that day, Barfoot disabled the lead tank with a bazooka, killed part of its crew with his Thompson submachine gun, and turned back the German attack. He then advanced into enemy-held territory and destroyed an abandoned German artillery piece. He returned to his own lines and helped two wounded soldiers from his squad to the rear.

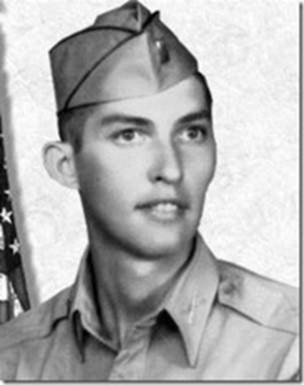
Van Thomas Barfoot newly promoted US Army Lieutenant circa 1944.

Barfoot was subsequently commissioned as a second lieutenant. His division moved into France, and by September 1944 was serving in the Rhone valley. Lt. Barfoot learned he would be awarded the Medal of Honor, and chose to have the presentation ceremony in the field so his soldiers could attend. He was formally presented with the medal on September 28, 1944, in Épinal, France, by Lieutenant General Alexander Patch.

==== Medal of Honor citation ====
Second Lieutenant Barfoot's official Medal of Honor citation reads:

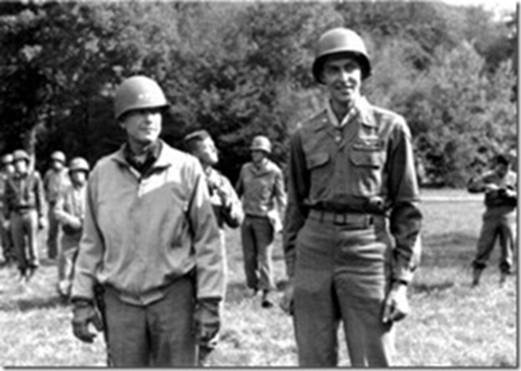
Lt. Van Thomas Barfoot (right) after being awarded the Medal of Honor by Lt. General Alexander Patch on September 22, 1944, in Epinal, France.

For conspicuous gallantry and intrepidity at the risk of life above and beyond the call of duty on 23 May 1944, near Carano, Italy. With his platoon heavily engaged during an assault against forces well entrenched on commanding ground, 2d Lt. Barfoot (then Tech. Sgt.) moved off alone upon the enemy left flank. He crawled to the proximity of 1 machinegun nest and made a direct hit on it with a hand grenade, killing 2 and wounding 3 Germans. He continued along the German defense line to another machinegun emplacement, and with his tommygun killed 2 and captured 3 soldiers. Members of another enemy machinegun crew then abandoned their position and gave themselves up to Sgt. Barfoot. Leaving the prisoners for his support squad to pick up, he proceeded to mop up positions in the immediate area, capturing more prisoners and bringing his total count to 17. Later that day, after he had reorganized his men and consolidated the newly captured ground, the enemy launched a fierce armored counterattack directly at his platoon positions. Securing a bazooka, Sgt. Barfoot took up an exposed position directly in front of 3 advancing Mark VI tanks. From a distance of 75 yards his first shot destroyed the track of the leading tank, effectively disabling it, while the other 2 changed direction toward the flank. As the crew of the disabled tank dismounted, Sgt. Barfoot killed 3 of them with his tommygun. He continued onward into enemy terrain and destroyed a recently abandoned German fieldpiece with a demolition charge placed in the breech. While returning to his platoon position, Sgt. Barfoot, though greatly fatigued by his Herculean efforts, assisted 2 of his seriously wounded men 1,700 yards to a position of safety. Sgt. Barfoot's extraordinary heroism, demonstration of magnificent valor, and aggressive determination in the face of pointblank fire are a perpetual inspiration to his fellow soldiers.

=== Post-World War II ===
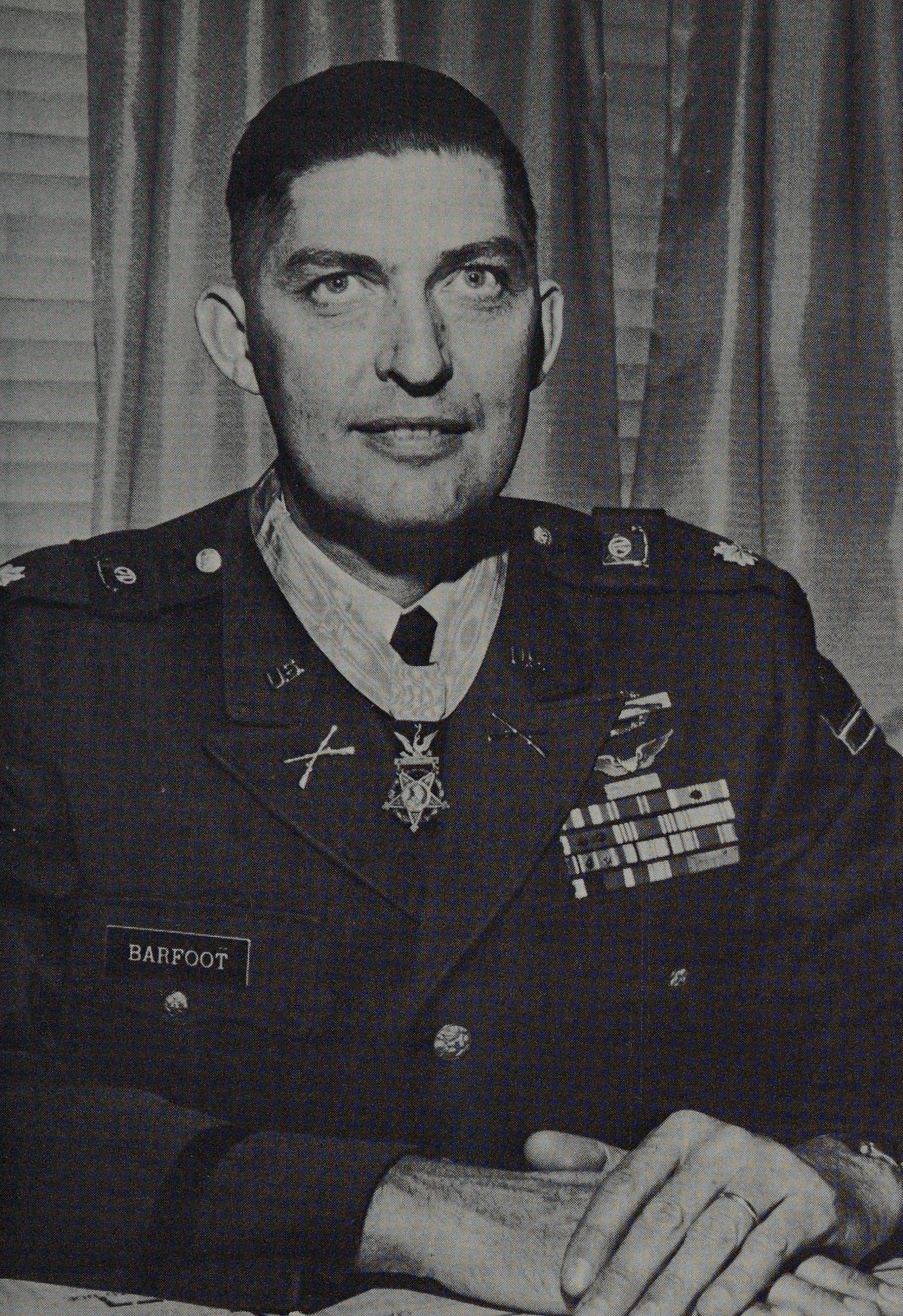
Barfoot as 501st Aviation Battalion commander c. 1965

Having grown up in the strictly segregated south, Barfoot was noted for a comment he made in 1945 regarding African-Americans. Democrat Mississippi senator and Ku Klux Klan member Theodore G. Bilbo asked Barfoot if he had much trouble with the African-American soldiers he had served with during the war. To Bilbo's embarrassment, Barfoot responded, "I found out after I did some fighting in this war that the colored boys fight just as good as the white boys...I've changed my idea a lot about colored people since I got into this war and so have a lot of other boys from the south".

Barfoot later served in the Korean War and Vietnam War. During the Vietnam War, he served as a deputy aviation officer and flew over 177 combat hours. He reached the rank of colonel before retiring from the Army in 1974. In retirement, he lived on a farm in Amelia County, Virginia, and later moved to Henrico County, Virginia, near his daughter.

== Flagpole dispute ==
In December 2009, the homeowners' association (HOA) of the Sussex Square, where Barfoot lived in Henrico County, Virginia, ordered him to remove the 21-foot (6.4 m) flagpole he had erected without their approval and from which he began flying the US flag regularly on Veterans Day. The HOA retained the Coates & Davenport law firm to threaten legal action to enforce their order. This news story first became public when Barfoot's son-in-law reported the story on local talk radio show Elliot in the Morning. Then Fox News and several other news networks picked up the story nationally. The association's bylaws do not forbid flagpoles, but the HOA ruled Barfoot, then aged 90, would not be allowed to use it "for aesthetic reasons." Barfoot contested their order, and received support from the public (48,000 people on a Facebook page), from the American Legion, from military groups, and from many politicians, including Virginia Senators Mark Warner and Jim Webb, and White House Press Secretary Robert Gibbs. Because of the backlash and outrage it received, the association dropped its request on December 8, 2009, ending the controversy within one week.

== Personal life and death ==
Barfoot married Norma Louise, née Davis in October 1944. The couple had four children, and several grandchildren and great-grandchildren. Norma Barfoot died in 1992.

Barfoot suffered a skull fracture and bleeding in the brain due to a bad fall in front of his home, and died two days later on March 2, 2012, at the age of 92.

== Honors ==

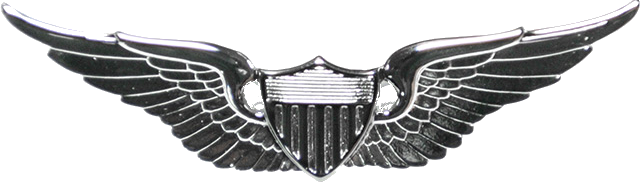

Combat Infantryman Badge
Army Aviator Badge
Medal of Honor		Silver Star
Legion of Merit with bronze oak leaf cluster	Bronze Star	Purple Heart with two bronze oak leaf clusters
Meritorious Service Medal	Air Medal with two bronze oak leaf clusters	Army Commendation Medal with bronze oak leaf cluster
Army Good Conduct Medal	American Defense Service Medal	American Campaign Medal
European–African–Middle Eastern Campaign Medal with arrowhead device and silver campaign star	World War II Victory Medal	Army of Occupation Medal with 'Germany' clasp
National Defense Service Medal with service star	Vietnam Service Medal with two bronze campaign stars	Vietnam Campaign Medal
Italian Medal of Military Valor	Vietnam Armed Forces Honor Medal (1st Class)	

On October 9, 2009, the portion of Mississippi Highway 16 which runs from Carthage through his hometown of Edinburg to the border between Leake and Neshoba counties was named the Van T. Barfoot Medal of Honor Highway. A building at Richmond Veterans Administration Medical Center in Richmond, Virginia, also carries his name. In May 2022, The Naming Commission recommended that Fort Pickett in Blackstone, Virginia be renamed Fort Barfoot, as part of a larger program of renaming installations named for Confederate Army leaders. The change was made official on March 24, 2023.

== See also ==
- List of Medal of Honor recipients for World War II
