= Edinburg, Mississippi =

- Unincorporated community
- Location within Mississippi Location within the United States
- Coordinates: 32°47′57″N 89°20′10″W
- Country: United States
- State: Mississippi
- County: Leake
- Elevation: 377 ft (115 m)
- Time zone: UTC-6 (Central (CST))
  - Summer (DST): UTC-5 (CDT)
- ZIP code: 39051
- Area codes: 601 & 769
- GNIS feature ID: 690913

Edinburg is an unincorporated community located in Leake County, Mississippi, United States. It is situated mainly on the right bank of the Pearl River at the junction of Mississippi Highway 16 and Mississippi Highway 427.

== History ==
Edinburg takes its name from Edinburgh, in Scotland.

In 1900, the community was home to the Edinburg High School and had a population of 123. A post office first began operation under the name Edinburgh in 1841.

== Notable people ==
- Van T. Barfoot, Medal of Honor recipient
- Jim Barnett, physician and politician
- Martin M. Miller, former member of the Mississippi House of Representatives
- Bill Stribling, football player
