= Jim Barnett (Mississippi politician) =

American politician

Jim C. Barnett

Member of the Mississippi House of Representatives from the 92nd district
- In office 1992–2008
- Succeeded by: Becky Currie

Personal details
- Born: December 8, 1926 Edinburg, Mississippi, U.S.
- Died: July 26, 2013 (aged 86) Jackson, Mississippi, U.S.
- Resting place: Riverwood Memorial Park in Brookhaven, Mississippi
- Party: Republican
- Children: 9
- Education: Millsaps College; Tulane University; University of Mississippi Medical Center; University of Texas Southwestern Medical Center
- Occupation: Physician and surgeon

Military service
- Branch/service: United States Navy
- Battles/wars: World War II; Korean War

Jim C. Barnett (December 8, 1926 – July 26, 2013) was an American physician and politician who served from 1992 to 2008 in the Mississippi House of Representatives.

Born in Edinburg in Leake County in central Mississippi, Barnett served in the United States Navy during World War II and as a naval flight surgeon during the Korean War. He went to Millsaps College in the capital city of Jackson, Mississippi, Tulane University in New Orleans, Louisiana, and the University of Mississippi Medical School. He graduated from the University of Texas Southwestern Medical Center in Dallas. Engaged in family practice and surgery in Lincoln County, he resided in Brookhaven. He died at St. Dominic Hospital in Jackson at the age of eighty-six.

In the legislature, Barnett worked successfully to bring the Mississippi School of the Arts to Brookhaven. A pilot, Barnett served for twelve years as the chairman of the Mississippi Aeronautics Commission. He was a member and chairman of the Mississippi Board of Mental Health. The mental health unit in Brookhaven is named in his honor.
