= Martin Miller (antiquarian) =

British antiquarian

Martin Miller (24 November 1946 - 24 December 2013) was a British antiquarian. He co-founded the bestselling Miller's Antiques Handbook & Price Guide. He was the husband of antiques expert Judith Miller from 1978 to 1992.
