= Martin M. Miller =

American politician

Member of the Mississippi House of Representatives from the Leake-Winston Counties district Leake County (1916-1920)
- In office January 1944 – January 1948
- In office January 1916 – January 1920

Personal details
- Born: September 14, 1888 Edinburg, Mississippi
- Died: June 1974 (aged 85)
- Party: Democrat

Martin Morgan Miller (September 14, 1888 - June 1974) was a Democratic member of the Mississippi House of Representatives from 1916 to 1920 and from 1944 to 1948.

== Biography ==
Martin Morgan Miller was born on September 14, 1888, in Edinburg, Mississippi. He was the son of James Thomas Miller and Treassie (Mooney) Miller. He attended the elementary schools of Leake County, Mississippi. He then attended Edinburg High School. After finishing high school, he attended Queen City Business College in Meridian, Mississippi, from which he graduated in April 1910. He became a farmer. In 1911, he was the County Lecturer for the Farmers' Union of Leake County. He represented Leake County as a Democrat in the Mississippi House of Representatives from 1916 to 1920. He represented Leake and Winston Counties in the Mississippi House as a floater representative from 1944 to 1948. He died in June 1974. His last residence was in Carthage, Mississippi.
