= Antiques Roadshow (series 33) =

Antiques Roadshow is a British television series produced by the BBC since 1979. Series 33 (2010/11) comprised 30 editions that were broadcast by the BBC from 19 September 2010 – 5 June 2011

The dates in brackets given below are the dates each episode was filmed at the location. The date not in brackets is the episode's first UK airing date on BBC One.

== Series 33 (2010/11) ==
1. Beverley Minster Part 1, East Riding of Yorkshire, inside, 19 September 2010 (14 May 2010)
2. Beverley Minster Part 2, East Riding of Yorkshire, inside, 26 September 2010 (14 May 2010)
3. Somerleyton Hall Part 2, Lowestoft, Suffolk, 3 October 2010 (10 September 2009) – Note: Part 1 was in Series 32 episode 22
4. STEAM – Museum of the Great Western Railway Part 1, Swindon, Wiltshire, inside, 10 October 2010 (originally scheduled for 15 October 2009, 22 April 2010)
5. Brighton College Part 1, East Sussex, outside, 17 October 2010 (3 June 2010)
6. Brighton College Part 2, East Sussex, outside, 24 October 2010 (3 June 2010)
7. Hopetoun House Part 2, West Lothian, 31 October 2010 (25 March 2009)
8. The British Museum Part 1, London, outside, 7 November 2010 (2 September 2010)
9. Tatton Park Part 1, near Knutsford, Cheshire, outside, 14 November 2010 (20 May 2010)
10. Tatton Park Part 2, near Knutsford, Cheshire, outside, 21 November 2010 (20 May 2010)
11. Hatfield House Part 1, Hertfordshire, outside, 28 November 2010 (15 July 2010)
12. Chatsworth House Part 1, Derbyshire, outside, 5 December 2010 (8 July 2010)
13. Chatsworth House Part 2, Derbyshire, outside, 26 December 2010 (8 July 2010)
14. Blair Castle 1, near Pitlochry, Perthshire, outside, 2 January 2011 (9 September 2010)
15. Hampton Court Castle Part 1, near Leominster, Herefordshire, outside, 20 February 2011 (22 July 2010)
16. Britannia Royal Naval College, Dartmouth Part 1, Devon, inside and outside, 27 February 2011 (18 June 2010)
17. Britannia Royal Naval College, Dartmouth Part 2, Devon, inside and outside, 6 March 2011 (18 June 2010)
18. Victoria Hall, Saltaire Part 1, West Yorkshire, inside, 13 March 2011 (29 April 2010)
19. Victoria Hall, Saltaire Part 2, West Yorkshire, inside, 20 March 2011 (29 April 2010)
20. St Fagans National History Museum, near Cardiff, outside, 27 March 2011 (10 June 2010)
21. The British Museum Part 2, London, outside, 3 April 2011 (2 September 2010)
22. STEAM – Museum of the Great Western Railway Part 2, Swindon, Wiltshire, inside, 10 April 2011 (22 April 2010)
23. Hatfield House Part 2, Hertfordshire, outside, 17 April 2011 (15 July 2010)
24. Winchester Cathedral Part 1, Hampshire, inside, 24 April 2011 (23 September 2010)
25. Winchester Cathedral Part 2, Hampshire, inside, 1 May 2011 (23 September 2010)
26. Hutton-in-the-Forest Part 1, near Penrith, Cumbria, outside, 8 May 2011 (1 July 2010)
27. Hampton Court Castle Part 2, near Leominster, Herefordshire, outside, 29 May 2011 (22 July 2010)
28. Retrospective, 5 June 2011
29. Compilation
  1. Hutton-in-the-Forest Part 2, near Penrith, Cumbria, outside, 17 July 2011 (1 July 2010)
  2. Chatsworth House Part 2, Derbyshire, outside, 17 July 2011 (8 July 2010)
  3. The British Museum Part 2, London, outside, 17 July 2011 (2 September 2010)
30. Colchester Town Hall (Moot Hall), Colchester, Essex, inside, 24 July 2011
