= Victoria Hall, Saltaire =

Building in Saltaire, West Yorkshire, England

Victoria Hall
- Facade of Victoria Hall, Saltaire

- Location within West Yorkshire

General information
- Status: Completed
- Location: Saltaire, England
- Coordinates: 53.837073°N 1.789786°W

Design and construction
- Architecture firm: Lockwood and Mawson
- Awards: Grade II* listed

Victoria Hall, Saltaire (originally the Saltaire Club and Institute) is a Grade II* listed building in the village of Saltaire, near Bradford, West Yorkshire, England, designed by architects Lockwood and Mawson.

== History ==
Saltaire Club and Institute was designed in 1867 by the architectural firm of Lockwood and Mawson for the industrialist and philanthropist Sir Titus Salt. It was built by John Barry of Scarborough at an initial cost £23,000 It was opened in 1871. In the original design, the building contained a main hall seating 800, a lecture room, two art rooms, a laboratory, a gymnasium, a library of 8,500 books and a reading room. For use of the building, a quarterly fee was charged. This ranged downwards from 2 shillings for adult males.

== Architecture ==
Victoria Hall is a T-plan, two-storey building with a basement, constructed in ashlar, with rock-faced stone and a Welsh slate roof.

=== Exterior ===
To the front, the exterior has a symmetrical, eleven-bay Italianate facade, with vermiculated quoins at ground floor level and pilaster quoins to the first floor. The central bay of the building breaks forward. On top of this bay is an elaborate square tower with pyramidal ashlar roof. Each side of the tower has a modillioned segmental pediment on an enriched entablature, supported by Corinthian columns, framing slender, round-arched windows. The central portal has double, panelled doors, fanlight, and large open segmental pediment supported on large consoles. The tympanum has a cartouche bearing the Salt family coat of arms, flanked by the carved figures of Art and Science by Thomas Milnes.

At basement level, the windows are square-headed, while at ground and first floor level the windows are round-arched and archivolted, the first floor windows being framed by fluted Corinthian colonnettes, and with carved head keystones and blind balustrade with turned balusters. There is a dentilled cornice between the ground and first floors. The modillioned cornice forms the base to a deep, panelled parapet decorated with rosettes and pedimented piers with grotesque winged beasts supporting iron finials. Three-bay return elevations.

The main hall projects at the rear. It is seven bays long by five bays wide with tall slender round-arched windows with glazing bars and circles in heads.

=== Interior ===
The entrance hall has a large, stone dog-leg staircase with large square piers and vertically symmetrical turned balusters. The main hall has an elaborately plastered, coffered roof. Pilasters mark the bay divisions and support a bracketed entablature. There is a raking gallery at the rear, on fluted cast-iron columns. The former side galleries have been removed and there is glass panelling at the rear.

=== Grounds ===
The building is set back from Victoria Road, on which it sits. There is a gardened square outside, bounded by a dwarf wall. At the front corners, on large square bases, are 2 sculpted lions by Thomas Milnes of London, representing War and Peace. At the rear of the wall are round section cast-iron railings with spear-head finials on a dwarf wall.

== Modern use ==
At the present time, it is commonly used as a concert venue. Memorable concerts held there include the homecoming gig of local group Terrorvision after they reunited in 2007.

in 2009 a 1937 three manual twelve rank Wurlitzer theatre pipe organ (ex Gaumont Cinema Oldham) was installed in the main hall by the Cinema Organ Society, with the pipes and percussion housed in chambers under the stage. The console rises up on a lift on to the stage when in use for concerts, weddings and other events, classic and silent film presentations, dances and practice sessions. The Society has also installed a projection system.

On 29 April 2010, the BBC TV series Antiques Roadshow was filmed at Victoria Hall. The show was broadcast in two parts on 13 and 20 March 2011.

== See also ==
- Antiques Roadshow, Series 33 (2010–11)
- Saltaire gymnastics club
