= Antiques Roadshow (series 32) =

British television series

Antiques Roadshow is a British television series produced by the BBC since 1979. The thirty-second series comprised 30 episodes broadcast from 20 September 2009 to 9 May 2010.

== Episodes ==
No. in series	Location	Filming date	Original release date	UK viewers (millions)
1	"Samarès Manor, Jersey"	12 June 2009	20 September 2009	5.59
2	"Blackpool Tower Ballroom Part 1, Lancashire"	3 April 2009	27 September 2009	5.35
3	"Blackpool Tower Ballroom Part 2, Lancashire"	3 April 2009	4 October 2009	5.26
4	"Hertford College, Oxford, Oxfordshire"	28 June 2008	11 October 2009	5.62
5	"Morwellham Quay, near Tavistock, Devon"	25 June 2009	25 October 2009	5.06
6	"Lincoln Cathedral Part 1, Lincolnshire"	19 March 2009	1 November 2009	5.86
7	"Lincoln Cathedral Part 2, Lincolnshire"	19 March 2009	8 November 2009	6.03
8	"Bowes Museum, Barnard Castle, County Durham"	27 August 2009	15 November 2009	5.85
9	"Bletchley Park Part 1, Milton Keynes, Buckinghamshire"	12 July 2009	22 November 2009	5.57
10	"Bletchley Park Part 2, Milton Keynes, Buckinghamshire"	12 July 2009	29 November 2009	5.74
11	"Burghley House, Stamford, Lincolnshire"	21 May 2009	6 December 2009	6.26
12	"Abbotsford House, Melrose, Roxburghshire"	2 July 2009	20 December 2009	6.17
13	"Saumarez Park, Guernsey"	9 June 2009	3 January 2010	6.33
14	"Brooklands Museum Part 1, Weybridge, Surrey"	31 May 2009	10 January 2010	6.64
15	"Brooklands Museum Part 2, Weybridge, Surrey"	31 May 2009	17 January 2010	6.78
16	"Aberglasney Gardens, Carmarthenshire"	16 July 2009	24 January 2010	6.24
17	"Bath Assembly Rooms Part 1, Somerset"	23 April 2009	31 January 2010	6.88
18	"Bath Assembly Rooms Part 2, Somerset"	23 April 2009	7 February 2010	6.93
19	"Blists Hill Victorian Town, Ironbridge, Shropshire"	17 September 2009	14 February 2010	7.09
20	"Leeds Town Hall Part 1, West Yorkshire"	3 September 2009	21 February 2010	7.17
21	"Leeds Town Hall Part 2, West Yorkshire"	3 September 2009	28 February 2010	6.92
22	"Somerleyton Hall Part 1, Lowestoft, Suffolk"	10 September 2009	7 March 2010	7.09
Note: Part 2 is in Series 33 episode 3
23	"Hopetoun House Part 1, West Lothian"	25 March 2009	21 March 2010	7.06
24	"Stanway House Part 1, Gloucestershire"	14 May 2009	28 March 2010	6.96
25	"Stanway House Part 2, Gloucestershire"	14 May 2009	4 April 2010	5.23
26	"Burghley House, Stamford, Lincolnshire; Abbotsford House, Melrose, Roxburghshire"	21 May 2009; 2 July 2009	11 April 2010	5.75
Compilation special
27	"Hopetoun House Part 2, West Lothian"	25 March 2009	18 April 2010	5.48
28	"Old Royal Naval College Part 1, Greenwich, London"	1 October 2009	25 April 2010	4.81
29	"Old Royal Naval College Part 2, Greenwich, London"	1 October 2009	2 May 2010	4.65
30	"Retrospective"	-	9 May 2010	4.84
