= Briglin Pottery =

The Briglin Pottery was a studio pottery founded in 1948 by Brigitte Goldschmidt (later known as Brigitte Appleby) and Eileen Lewenstein in the basement of premises at 66 Baker Street, London. Its object was "to produce well designed, attractive pots that could be used in the home, and to sell them at affordable prices." It produced a large quantity of domestic pottery, much of it recognisable from its dark earthenware body, muted colours, white glaze and wax resist designs. In some ways Briglin was atypical of post-war studio potteries: it made tin-glazed earthenware when most others were making stoneware, it employed staff at the time when most studio potters worked alone or with a few assistants, and its pottery and shop were in the West End of London when many potters preferred the country.

Appleby said of the pottery, “While the London location presupposes high salaries and overheads, it has the advantage of easy access to raw materials, a perpetually changing patronage as well as an unlimited choice of assistants. We employ at our studio fifteen people and make over three thousand pieces a week.” One of her staff, Michael Crosby-Jones, commented, “Yes, Briglin is very commercial. This means that the pottery is a viable concern and the ten full-time employees plus half a dozen part-time employees are very pleased about this.” Their staff included Donald Mills, who worked with them from 1948 to 1952, and Anthony Barson who specialised in painted decoration.

Due to a fire in 1952, the pottery moved to 22 Crawford Street where it continued until its closure in 1990. Lewenstein left the pottery in 1959 to set up her own studio. Both she and Appleby were active in forming the Craft Potters Association and served it for many years. Lewenstein co-edited its journal Ceramic Review from 1970 until 1997.

Brigitte Appleby died in April, 2000 and Eileen Lewenstein in March, 2005.

In 2002 Anthea Arnold published a history of the pottery.

Example of Briglin's pottery are included in the collection of the University of Warwick
