= Bridlington Spa =

Conference centre in England

- The Spa Bridlington
- Bridlington Spa adaptive logo
- Interactive map of Bridlington Spa
- Address: Bridlington Spa; South Marine Drive; Bridlington; YO15 3JH; East Riding of Yorkshire; England
- Coordinates: 54.07928°N 0.19643°W
- Owner: East Riding of Yorkshire Council
- Capacity: 3,800 Royal Hall standing 1,700 seated / 675 Spa Theatre (incl. wheelchair spaces)
- Type: Traditional
- Current use: Concert venue, theatre and conference centre

Construction
- Opened: 1896
- Rebuilt: 1932
- Years active: 1896–present

Website
- bridspa.com

Bridlington Spa is a dance hall, theatre and conference centre in Bridlington, East Riding of Yorkshire, England. Refurbished between 2006 and 2008 and further updated with a new branding in 2016, the venue boasts a large Art Deco ball room, Edwardian theatre, art gallery and a selection of other meeting and event spaces; all featuring outstanding views over Bridlington's South Bay.

The original Spa on the site was built in 1896; which consisted of a theatre and seaside pavilion. A fire in 1906 saw the theatre destroyed and a replacement opera house was built in 1907 and still forms part of the building today. The local authority took control of the buildings in 1914, acquired it in 1919 and rebuilt all but the theatre in 1926. A further fire destroyed these later buildings in 1932 and work started almost immediately to construct their replacements. Bridlington Spa continues to be owned and operated by East Riding of Yorkshire Council.

Bridlington Spa serves as a popular venue on the UK concert circuit, having a maximum capacity for a standing concert of 3,800. The venue has most recently hosted gigs by Madness, Last Shadow Puppets, The 1975 and Kasabian. It was at Bridlington Spa that Oasis played their final indoor concert.

== History ==
The extensive gardens and buildings opened on 27 July 1896, with the introduction of Herr Meyer Lutz's Grand Band and under the astute management of Henry Hague, proved to be an enormous success, with the Spa Theatre and the glass dome for ballroom dancing being the jewels in the crown. People could stay all day for sixpence. On the evening of 20 October 1906, at around 9 p.m. a fire broke out. The fire spread rapidly and the building was engulfed by the time the horse-drawn fire engine arrived from its depot in Ashville Street. The fire crew, led by Chief Captain Rennard, managed to save the famous glass dome adjoining the northern end of the theatre. Plans were drawn up for a replacement by Messers Whittaker Bros and the New Spa Company, under the guidance of the architect, Mr W. S. Walker. The general building contract went to Thomas Spink, of Bridlington. Just nine months later in July 1907, the opening ceremony was performed by Mrs Beerbohm Tree, a renowned actress of the British stage, and the wife of Mr Herbert Beerbohm Tree, the actor and famous impresario.

In 1914 the council took a lease on the Spa and in 1919 they purchased it. In 1925 the council replaced the last of the 1890s Spa with new Spa Royal Hall. It opened in 1926 and was built at a cost of £50,000 it was a flagship art deco building. On the night of 29 January 1932 it burnt down though fortunately the theatre was not badly damaged and able to reopen at Easter. In a remarkable feat of design and construction the new Royal Hall was designed by the borough architect Peter Newton and built in 52 days to re-open on 29 July 1932.

Before 1939 the Spa provided plays and variety in the theatre and dancing in the Royal Hall. Herman Darewski was the well-known and very successful musical director at the Spa from 1924 to 1939. After the Second World War the traditional holiday trade and entertainments continued but as the 1960s dawned, the motorcar, increased wealth and the package tour brought about changes. The British seaside resort was changing again, the Spa moved away from weekly shows, and the theatre and dances in the hall, to a new broader entertainment base. The Royal hall has been a feature of the British Rock circuit now for over 30 years with many famous artists playing it. The world darts championship used this venue before its refurbishment and the World Finals of the 2008 Winmau World Masters returned to The Spa. Conference and association use of the facilities has increased to balance the decline in traditional entertainments.

Between 2006 and 2009 the venue was completely refurbished at a cost of £20.5 million with funding provided by Yorkshire Forward, European Development Fund and council funding. It reopened in May 2008 under the name The Spa Bridlington.

Oasis on 15 July 2009 sold out the Bridlington Spa within two minutes of the tickets coming on sale, Oasis played at the theatre on 20 August 2009 as a warm up before headlining the V Festival later in the week.

In May 2016, Bridlington Spa's theatre was further developed bringing a centre aisle to the stalls auditorium. The seat rows on each side of the new aisle were reinstalled in sweeping curves to improve the sight lines in the space.

In December 2016, the venue undertook a full rebranding in advance of the imminent commencement of Hull UK City of Culture 2017. The rebrand, conceived and designed by Fred Marketing in Hull, changed the name back to Bridlington Spa and introduced a new multi-adaptive logo and a unified style for the building exteriors, interiors, website and printed media.

== Facilities ==
The facilities of the Spa at Bridlington include the Royal Hall, with a maximum standing capacity 3,800, the Spa Theatre which seats 675, the Harbour Suite with views over the bay and the Gallery Suite which is used as an art gallery featuring differing local artists' work each week. Other facilities include the Promenade Bar and Bay View Lounge; both featuring panoramic sea views and a Board Room allowing seating around a large table for 22 people. The main entrance on South Marine Drive leads to the Box Office and the Spa Café Bar. This Café bar is another space within the refurbished building with a huge window over Bridlington's South Bay and is a vantage point whatever the weather. A range of pianists play over lunchtimes during the week.

Spa Theatre

This is an Edwardian auditorium with a traditional theatre layout of stalls and circle seating provides an environment for music, dance and drama. The Spa Theatre is equipped with sound and lighting systems and has the ability to fly scenery. An earlier theatre burned down in 1906, the replacement theatre is basically intact today. The interior, with restrained ornament in what was described as Italian Renaissance style, consisted of a pit (with separate entrance) now seated and a single balcony, returned to the proscenium wall and divided into three areas: grand, upper and back circle. The proscenium arch is almost square with a central cartouche containing a female mask. In the ceiling is a round saucer dome with four relief plaster leaf scrolls and four smaller swags dividing the dome. The whole is surrounded by a moulded cornice. In the main part, above the stalls, there is an octagonal raised cornice. The balcony, supported on plain columns, has a panelled front with rich plaster scrolls. The walls at both levels are simply decorated with panels. The balcony is now divided into two areas separated by a barrier approximately two feet high. The disused entrance on the Esplanade (dated 1907) is in three bays, modestly detailed in classical style with a segmental pediment over the centre. The two entrance doors set in a projecting enclosed porch under a curved-fronted balcony supported on consoles. The entrance on South Marine Drive gives access to a good sized foyer nearly at circle level with the former main entrance on the Esplanade at stalls/pit level. In January 1932 the adjacent Royal Hall was gutted by fire. The Spa Theatre suffered minor smoke and water damage. An insurance settlement allowed rapid repair and full redecoration, the theatre reopening at Easter 1932. It remained open whilst the Royal Hall was reconstructed.

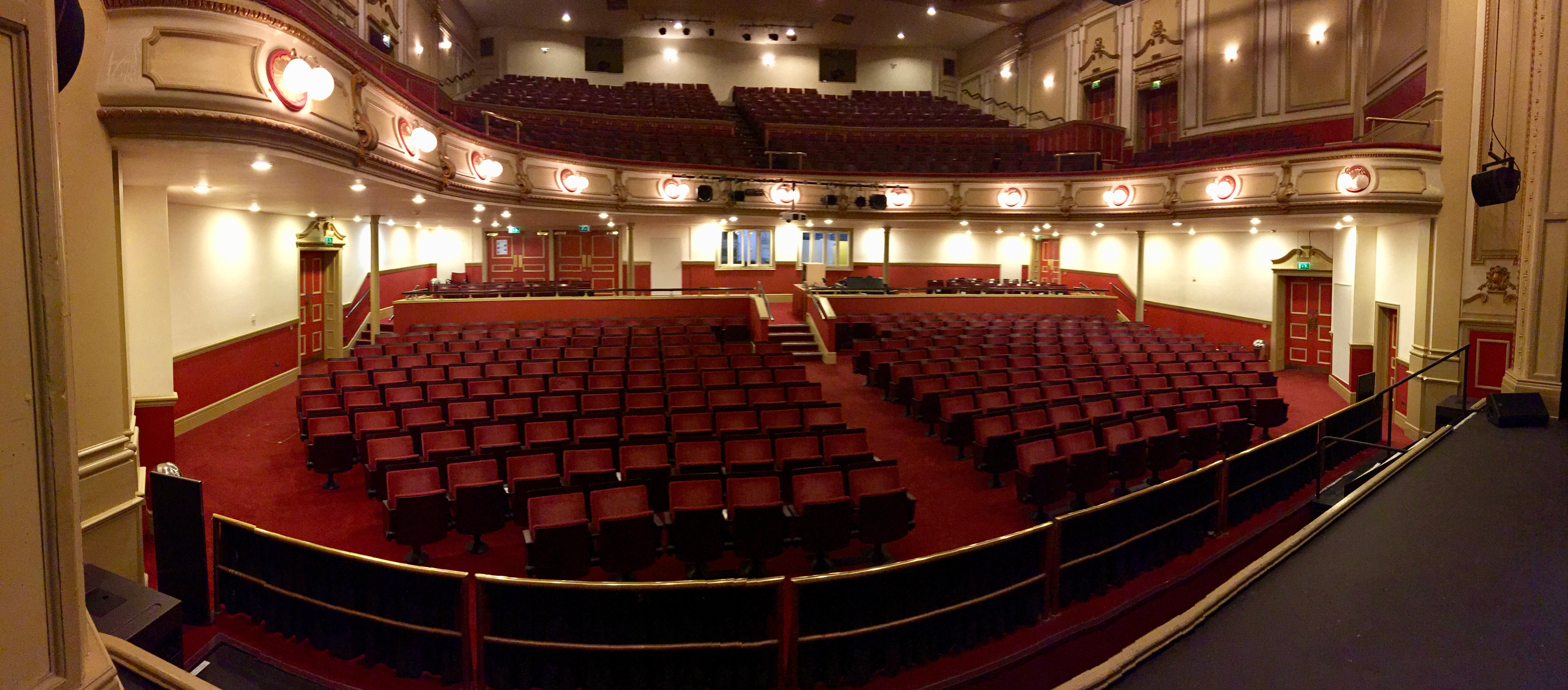
Bridlington Spa Theatre Auditorium showing the centre aisle in the stall introduced in May 2016

Royal Hall

The 1930s decor of the Royal Hall/Ballroom provides the setting for dances and social functions. The Royal Hall has hosted a number of prestigious events throughout the year including televised sports and major rock concerts. Overlooking the dance floor is a balcony with fixed seating. The Royal Hall holds a maximum of 3,800 people for a standing concert or 1,700 theatre style.

The Harbour Suite has views across the sea and a bar, and is made up of two rooms, it has a total seating capacity of around 120, dependent on seating configuration.

The 'Gallery Suite' is a long room with a removable wall in the centre. It is a very light and airy room with windows opening onto South Marine Drive. It is permanently configured as an art gallery with weekly exhibitions of local artists' work, but is also a hireable space for businesses and organisations who benefit from the exhibitions on the walls. This room has very easy access from the foyer and box office.

== Redevelopment ==
Bridlington Spa and Theatre is situated on the south promenade on the sea front adjacent to the harbour. Whilst the building is protected from the ravages of the North Sea by Bridlington Bay it has nevertheless been subjected to tidal flooding and sea air for almost 100 years. As a consequence much of the structural steelwork and concrete had been contaminated, resulting in rusting, spalling and water penetration.

Bosa Contracts were invited by Hall Construction Limited and Wates to provide recommendations to overcome the specific problems in the structural concrete elements including beams and retaining walls within the original structure. With the assistance of Sika Ltd and EPMS proposals and costings were produced using Sika Monotop for concrete repairs, Icosit Activ Primers for structural steelwork and a Vapour-Proof Sika 1 Structural Waterproofing System for ground retaining walls.

Details of the £20.5 million refurbishment include:

- New main entrance and associated alterations to the South Marine Drive elevation
- Remodelling the north end of the building, involving the removal of the single-storey offices and construction of a much more compact two-storey conference suite
- Addition of new glazed bays to the promenade elevation
- New infill to the façade of the Royal Hall
- Repair, refurbishment and renewal of the external element of the building including doors and windows.

Spa Theatre

This two-tier Edwardian theatre has been stripped back to the bone and rebuilt with 675 new seats, a strengthened structure and modern backstage facilities for moving scenery. A larger lighting and sound box with state-of-the-art technology is now in place at the back of the stalls.

Royal Hall

The 1930s ballroom has kept its art deco character while being given an extensive facelift. Big changes include a new east-facing wall, modern technical facilities and new colour scheme, but most importantly the floor foundations have been entirely rebuilt and a new sprung wooden dance floor laid down. Unseen for years, having been blacked out, every pane of the Dome's arching, patterned, leaded glass canopy has been cleaned and restored to its original condition when it opened in 1932. It is now fitted with a black-out curtain to shut out the light if required. The ornate, circular frieze has been repainted in colours of the period and reaching out across the ceiling is sunburst gilding.

Harbour Suite

A new wing at the north end of the building houses conference and meeting facilities. The Harbour Suite has large bay windows with extensive sea views, as well as modern technical requirements from laptops and projectors to Wi-Fi, AV and video links to other rooms.

Kitchens

New equipment has been installed in much larger kitchens that will enable The Spa's chefs to cater for up to 700 guests in one go. It has been equipped with hi-tech cookers, blast chillers, and specialist tools.

The Spa project forms an important aspect of the Bridlington Regeneration Strategy, a 10-year programme to transform Bridlington with upwards of £50 million of investment and the creation of 2,500 new jobs. It is hoped that the modernisation of facilities at the venue, will help boost tourist numbers to the town, contribute to the regeneration of the economy. Additional European funding which takes the grant funding to £10.4 million. The Spa's reopening week ran from 31 May to 7 June 2008 and included a concert by rock band, The Pigeon Detectives, business events and an open day.

The Spa Bridlington now hosts free venue tours on at least one Sunday a month to allow local residents and visitors alike an opportunity to view this venue. These tours are, in the main, guided by members of the senior management team to allow guests to ask any question and receive a reply immediately.

== 2016 venue rebranding ==
On Wednesday 14 December 2016, Bridlington Spa revealed its new branding to a business audience in the venue's theatre. The announcement was the culmination of over eighteen months planning and showcased a new adaptive design developed in conjunction with Fred Marketing in Hull.
