= Abbie Noel Campbell =

African-American soldier (1918 –2007)

- Born: Abbie Noel Mitchell; December 21, 1918; Tuskegee, Alabama, U.S.
- Died: July 2, 2007 (aged 88); Tuskegee, Alabama, U.S.
- Military career
- Allegiance: United States
- Branch: Women's Army Auxiliary Corps; United States Army
- Service years: 1942–1946
- Rank: Captain (executive officer)
- Units: 3rd Training Regiment WAAC, Fort Des Moines 6888th Central Postal Directory Battalion ("Six Triple Eight")
- Conflicts: World War II
- Awards: Congressional Gold Medal (2022, collectively with 6888th)

Abbie Noel Campbell (née Mitchell December 21, 1918 – July 2, 2007) was an African American officer. She served as the executive officer of the 6888th Central Postal Directory Battalion, the only African-American and multi-ethnic US Women’s Army Corps (WAC) unit sent overseas during World War II. In 2022, Campbell alongside other member of the unit were awarded the Congressional Gold Medal in honor of its service.

== Early life and education ==
Abbie Noel Campbell was born on December 21, 1918, in Tuskegee, Alabama, the youngest child of Thomas Monroe Campbell and Anna M Ayers. Her father was an agricultural educator and her mother was a homemaker. She grew up in Tuskegee and attended local schools before enrolling at Tuskegee Institute, where she graduated in 1940. After graduating, Campbell worked as a junior high school teacher in Cartersville, Georgia.

== Military service ==
Campbell enlisted in the WAAC on July 16, 1942, and was among the first African American women to be commissioned as officers. She graduated with the first WAC officer candidate class in August 1942 and went on to command a WAC detachment at Camp Breckinridge, Kentucky.

In 1945, Campbell was appointed the 6888th Central Postal Directory Battalion executive officer, serving under Major Charity Adams. They travelled to Europe together with other civilians and military personnel. Having arrived in the UK, Campbell was among the officers who faced the challenges of war, including experiencing racial discrimination from certain U.S. military personnel directed at Black women officers. She accompanied Adams to Paris to present a report to the commanding officers and played an important role in the first steps of the deployment of the battalion, particularly in welcoming the new arrivals in Scotland from the Atlantic Ocean in early 1945.

In 2022, the Congressional Gold Medal was awarded to the 6888th in recognition of its members' contributions.

== Media coverage and legacy ==
Campbell's contributions, along with those of her fellow members of the 6888th, have gained recognition in recent years for their pivotal role in World War II and their trailblazing efforts toward racial and gender integration in the U.S. military.

- The biographical film The Six Triple Eight was released in 2024 by Netflix and was created by Tyler Perry. It stars Milauna Jackson as Campbell and co-stars Kerry Washington as Major Charity Adams.
