= Ebony Obsidian =

American actress (born 1994)

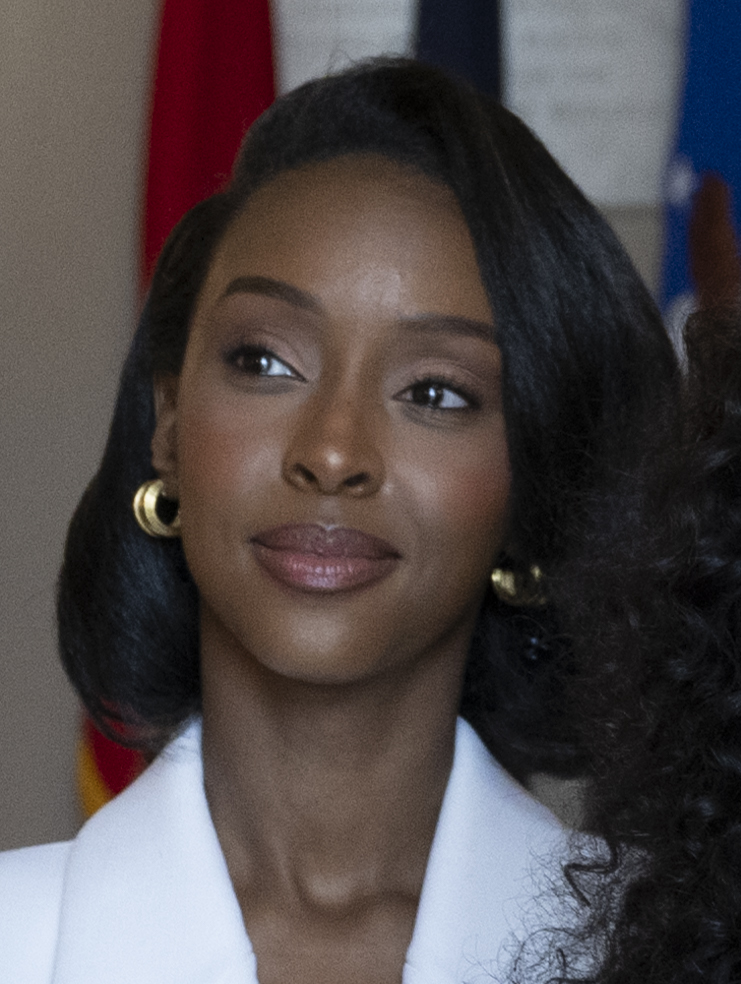
- Obsidian in 2024
- Born: New Paltz, New York, U.S
- Occupation: Actress
- Years active: 2014–present

Ebony Obsidian is an American actress. She had a supporting role in the 2018 drama film If Beale Street Could Talk and the following year began starring as Karen Mott in the BET comedy-drama series, Sistas. In 2024, Obsidian played Lena Derriecott Bell King in the war drama film, The Six Triple Eight, earning her an NAACP Image Award for Outstanding Supporting Actress in a Motion Picture as well as Outstanding Breakthrough Performance.

== Early life ==
Obsidian was born and raised in New Paltz, New York. She is of West Indian and Eritrean descent. She began performing in her childhood but never really saw it as a career. She later went into college for journalism. Obsidian left college while working on three jobs for acting and trained at the William Esper Studio. While studying, she began acting; she appeared in independent films, including The Vixens and Where Hearts Lie opposite Malik Yoba and Clifton Powell, as well as an uncredited appearance in the superhero film, The Amazing Spider-Man 2.

== Career ==
In 2015, Obsidian starred in Tough Love, a web series that aired on YouTube. The series started as a micro budget project that eventually attracted more than 45,000 unique viewers with over 1 million channel views. In 2017 she made a guest-starring appearance in an episode of the Netflix comedy-drama series, Master of None. In 2018, Obsidian co-starred in the drama film If Beale Street Could Talk, playing Adrienne Hunt, one of two sisters of the lead character Alonzo "Fonny" Hunt.

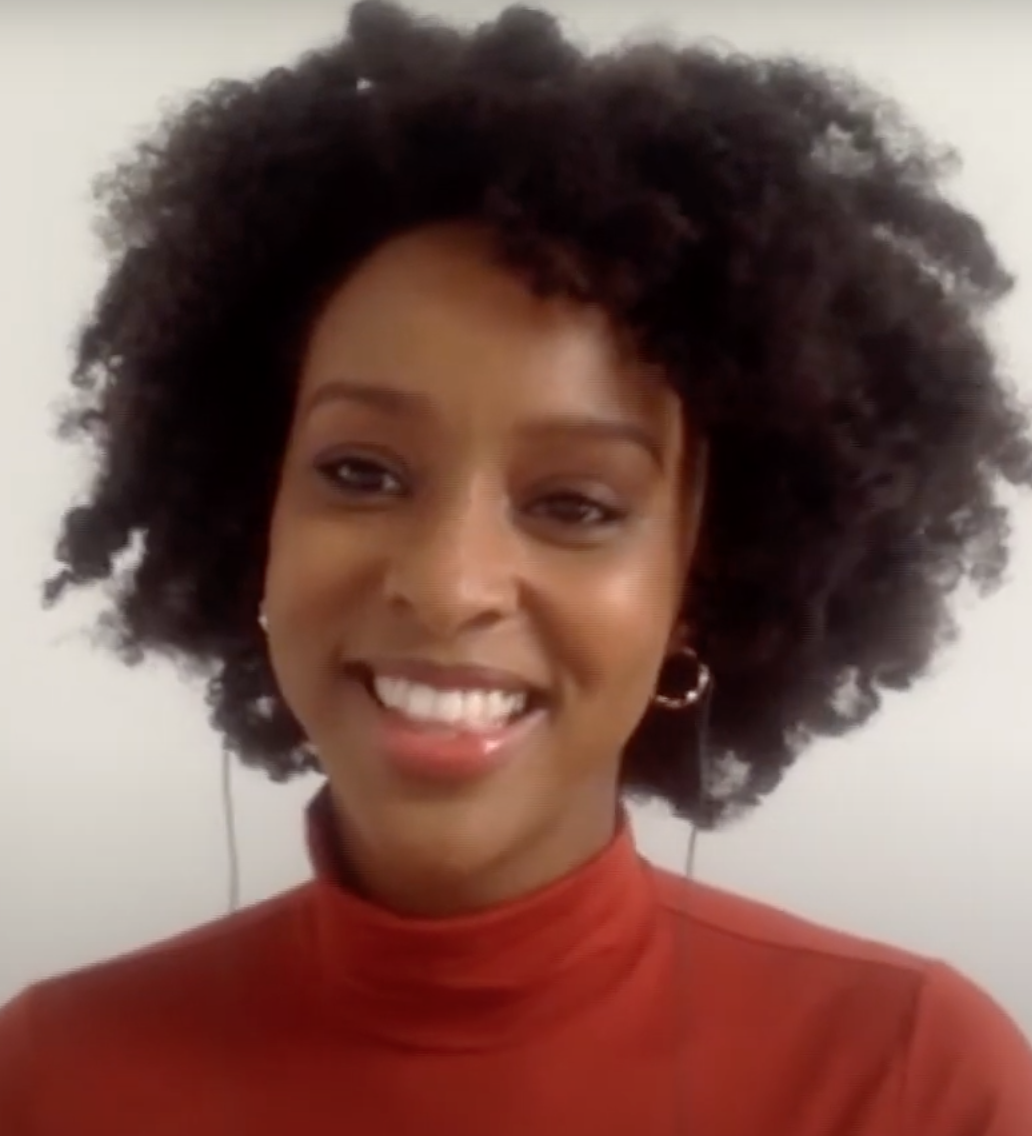
Obsidian in 2021

In 2019, Obsidian was cast in the Hulu biographical drama series, Wu-Tang: An American Saga playing Nia. The series ended in 2023 after three seasons. Later in 2019, she began starring as Karen Mott, one of the lead characters, in the BET comedy-drama series, Sistas by Tyler Perry. In 2020, she had a recurring role as Carol Hawthorne in the Amazon drama series Hunters during the show's first season.

In 2023, Obsidian was cast opposite Kerry Washington, Susan Sarandon and Oprah Winfrey in the war drama film, The Six Triple Eight. The Six Triple Eight was released in some cinemas on December 6, 2024, before its streaming debut by Netflix on December 20, 2024. She played Lena Derriecott King, a member of the 6888th Central Postal Directory Battalion, the only all-Black, all-female unit to serve overseas during World War II; Derricott was one of the Battalion's last five surviving members. Obsidian received positive reviews from critics for her performance. Ian Thomas wrote in a review for Black History Month: "Ebony Obsidian shines as Lena Derriecott King, a battalion member whose personal journey reflects the broader struggles and triumphs of the unit." At the 56th NAACP Image Awards, Obsidian won awards for Outstanding Supporting Actress in a Motion Picture and Outstanding Breakthrough Performance in a Motion Picture for playing Lena Derriecott King.

Obsidian is an Ambassador of the International Rescue Committee organization. In 2023, she visited South Sudan, where she witnessed the country’s mounting humanitarian needs and the effects of the climate crisis.

== Filmography ==
=== Film ===
Year	Title	Role	Notes
2014	The Amazing Spider-Man 2	Graduate	Uncredited
2015	Punkin Pie	Katrina Richardson	Short; IndieFEST Film Award of Merit Special Mention
2015	The Vixens	Etta Onwago	
2016	Where Hearts Lie	Sheila	
2016	Twelve Dollar Words	Treasure	Short
2017	Capital Inferno	Jamie	Short
2017	My Brothers Keeper	Lady Macbeth	
2018	If Beale Street Could Talk	Adrienne Hunt	Nominated — Florida Film Critics Circle Award for Best Ensemble; Nominated — Georgia Film Critics Association Award for Best Ensemble; Nominated — Seattle Film Critics Society Award for Best Ensemble Cast; Nominated — Washington D.C. Area Film Critics Association Award for Best Ensemble
2019	Swipe	-	Short; Independent Horror Movie Award for Best Actress
2019	Such A Deal	Grace	Short
2019	About The People	The Janitor	Short
2024	The Six Triple Eight	Lena Derriecott King	Won — NAACP Image Award for Outstanding Supporting Actress in a Motion Picture; Won — NAACP Image Award for Outstanding Breakthrough Performance in a Motion Picture; Won — NAACP Image Award for Outstanding Ensemble Cast in a Motion Picture

=== Television ===
Year	Title	Role	Notes
2015–18	Tough Love	Alicia Davis	Series regular, 18 episodes
2016	I Am Homicide	Juanita	Episode: "Serial Shooter"
2017	Master of None	Michelle	Episode: "Thanksgiving"
2019–23	Wu-Tang: An American Saga	Nia	Recurring role, 12 episodes
2019–25	Sistas	Karen Mott	Series regular
2020	Hunters	Carol Lockhart	Recurring role, 6 episodes
