= The Six Triple Eight (soundtrack) =

Film score by Aaron Zigman
- Released: December 6, 2024
- Length: 53:59
- Label: Netflix Music
- Producers: Aaron Zigman; Tyler Perry; Joel C. High

Aaron Zigman chronology
Zigman: Émigré (2024)	The Six Triple Eight (2024)

The Six Triple Eight is the soundtrack album to the 2024 film The Six Triple Eight directed by Tyler Perry. The original score is composed by Aaron Zigman and was released through Netflix Music on December 6, 2024. The film also features an original song "The Journey" written by Diane Warren and performed by H.E.R. which was nominated for the Academy Award for Best Original Song.

== Background ==
The Six Triple Eight features an original score composed by Aaron Zigman in his eleventh collaboration with Tyler Perry since Why Did I Get Married? (2007). Zigman also renewed his association with music supervisor Joel C. High, film editor Maysie Hoy, and music editor Johnny Caruso, on this film. As the film is about the 6888th Central Postal Directory Battalion, an all-black, all-female battalion, in World War II, Zigman felt it important "to create a score that would support the story, and not overpower its primary purpose". He was influenced by the big band era, as well as composers Aaron Copland and Samuel Barber, but the approach was driven by the emotional depth of the characters.

The first cue written for the film was for the scene where the battalion come off the ship after arriving in Europe. He added, "The power of the scene and its sheer awe is one of the most powerful cinematic moments in the film. The way it was shot when the soldiers come off of the ship is breathtaking and also for me has such an emotional impact. You see the subtle emotion of the British, relieved to have the allies in their corner." The sequence motivated him to write a cue that would represent these women as an elegant form, and used an "open Americana kind of feel, just an open elegance to celebrate them." Zigman played most of the themes at piano for the creative process, where the piano essentially contains the whole orchestra, and that would help him provide the collection of sonic data and sounds for the score.

The film also features an original song "The Journey" which played in the film's end credits and was written by Diane Warren and performed by H.E.R., who also played guitar and piano on the track. The song was initially incorporated in a particular scene at the latter part which as "very emotional scene, that I quote her stunning theme and kind of half-time it". "The Journey" was previously used to soundtrack ESPN's coverage of the 2023 NBA Finals. A music video, featuring H.E.R. performing in concert intercut with clips from the film, was released in November 2024. The Six Triple Eight (Soundtrack from the Netflix Film) was released digitally on December 6, 2024, through Netflix Music.

== Reception ==
Pete Hammond of Deadline Hollywood wrote "Aaron Zigman's score is effective as is a soaring Diane Warren song "The Journey," emotionally sung by H.E.R." Tara Brady of The Irish Times wrote "Aaron Zigman's soaring score carries the film to a teary finale." Peter Debruge from Variety and Frank Scheck from The Hollywood Reporter described the score rousing and inspirational.

== Track listing ==
All tracks are written by Aaron Zigman.

The Six Triple Eight (Soundtrack from the Netflix Film) track listing
No.	Title	Length
1.	"Trenches"	2:55
2.	"Kiss Me"	1:38
3.	"Mail Delivery"	1:02
4.	"Abram Letter"	1:52
5.	"Boarding the Train"	1:15
6.	"Women Arriving at Camp"	2:49
7.	"Capt. Adams Addresses the Troops"	2:14
8.	"Eleanor Roosevelt"	0:58
9.	"Gas Chamber"	2:03
10.	"Mary McLeod Bethune Speaks"	2:09
11.	"Training Montage"	1:19
12.	"Movie Theatre Confrontation"	1:29
13.	"Orders"	0:54
14.	"Appropriate Accommodations"	1:04
15.	"Flashback"	0:50
16.	"Arriving in England"	4:20
17.	"This Is Our Mission"	1:25
18.	"Letters and Friendship"	1:15
19.	"Lena, You're a Soldier"	1:27
20.	"Jigsaw Puzzle"	1:44
21.	"Evil Women"	1:18
22.	"Lena Has a Realization"	2:03
23.	"UEXB"	0:51
24.	"Abram's Letter"	1:12
25.	"Finding Abram"	4:26
26.	"General Calls HQ"	4:28
27.	"Bonus Track"	4:27

== Personnel ==
Credits adapted from Film Music Reporter:

- Music composer: Aaron Zigman
- Music producer: Aaron Zigman, Tyler Perry, Joel C. High
- Music supervision by: Joel C. High
- Associate music supervisor: Sami Posner
- Orchestra: Nashville Music Scoring
- Orchestra performed at: Ocean Way Studios
- Conductor: Aaron Zigman, Brian Eads
- Music contractor and concertmaster: Alan Umstead
- Pro Tools editing by: Adam Olstead and Katelyn Prieboy
- Engineered by: Nick Spezia, Ilya Truskovsky
- Assistant engineer: Austin Brown
- Recorded by: Ilya Truskovsky
- Mixed by: Dennis Sands
- Supervising music editor: Johnny Caruso
- Music editor: Jeff Charbonneau
- Music coordinators: Lia Avraham, Celeste Debro
- Music assistants: Amber Okeh, Triniti Daniel-Robinson

== Accolades ==
Zigman's score was shortlisted in the category of Best Original Score at the 97th Academy Awards.

Award	Date of ceremony	Category	Recipient(s)	Result	Ref.
Academy Awards	March 2, 2025	Best Original Song	"The Journey" – Diane Warren	Pending	
Black Reel Awards	February 10, 2025	Outstanding Original Song	"The Journey" – Diane Warren; Performed by H.E.R.	Pending	
Hollywood Music in Media Awards	November 20, 2024	Original Score – Feature Film	Aaron Zigman	Nominated	
Hollywood Music in Media Awards	November 20, 2024	Best Original Song – Feature Film	"The Journey" – Diane Warren; Performed by H.E.R.	Won	
Satellite Awards	January 26, 2025	Best Original Song	"The Journey" – Diane Warren	Nominated	
Society of Composers & Lyricists Awards	February 12, 2025	Outstanding Original Song for a Dramatic or Documentary Visual Media Production	"The Journey" – Diane Warren	Pending	
