= Edna W. Cummings =

American military colonel and author

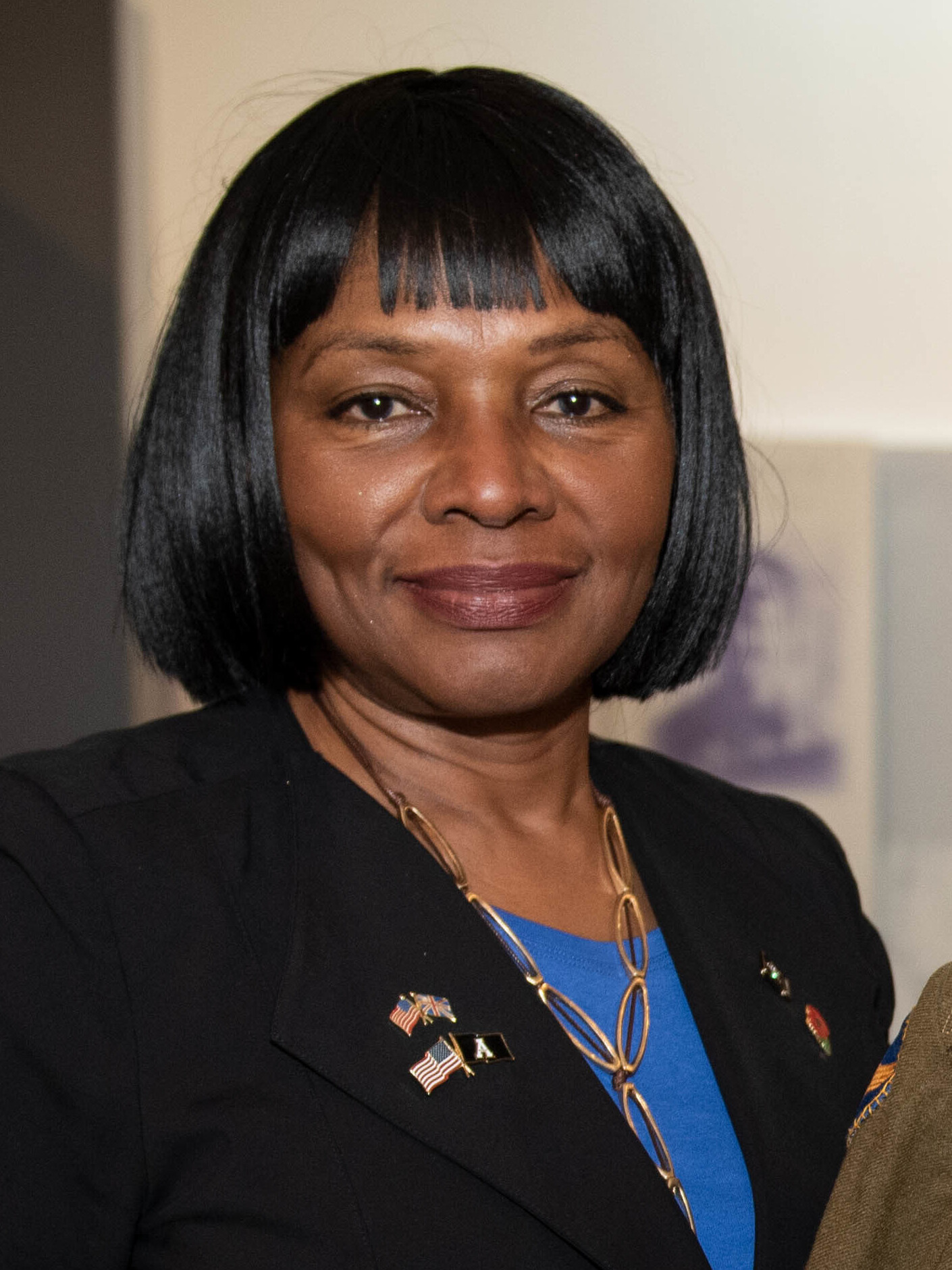
Cummings in 2019

Edna W. Cummings is a retired United States Army colonel, advocate, and author. She was born in Fayetteville, North Carolina, and grew up in an Army family. In 1978, she was the first Black woman to graduate from Appalachian State University's Army Reserve Officers’ Training Corps program.

Cummings served in the Army for 25 years. After her retirement, she held various leadership positions and managed homeland security and information technology initiatives for federal contractors. In 2021, she was appointed as the Army Reserve Ambassador for Maryland, a position that is equivalent to a two-star general in the military.

Cummings led efforts to enact the legislation that awarded the 6888th Central Postal Directory Battalion, a predominantly-Black multi-ethnic battalion of the Women's Army Corps, with a Congressional Gold Medal.

Cummings is the author of A Soldier's Life: A Black Woman's Rise from Army Brat to Six Triple Eight Champion, published by the University of Virginia Press.

== Military career ==
In 1978, Cummings received her commission from the Army Reserve Officer Training Corps, at Appalachian State University, in Boone, North Carolina. She was the first Black woman to enroll in the program and graduate as an officer. She was commissioned as an officer in the Women's Army Corps, which would be disbanded later that year.

In an interview with AFRO News, Cummings explained that her desire to serve in the military was shaped by her father having served, as well as her admiration for the women in active duty she had met while growing up on and around military installations such as Fort Bragg.

Cummings' first post was as a logistics officer, assigned to Fort Lee, Virginia (later renamed Fort Gregg-Adams). She went on to become a quartermaster officer assigned to Fort Novosel, Alabama, where she oversaw the refueling of helicopters for flight school students. She was also an executive officer for air traffic controllers, and later a member of the protocol staff.

Throughout her career, Cummings held several leadership positions, including:

- Army ROTC leadership instructor (Georgetown University, Washington, D.C.)
- Chief of Emergency Operations (Office of the Chief of Army Reserve, Pentagon, Washington, D.C.).
- Reserve Forces Advisor (USNORTHCOM/NORAD, Colorado Springs, Colorado)

In 2003, Cummings retired as a colonel.

=== Awards and decorations ===
- 2002 Defense Superior Service Medal
- 2020 Army Women's Foundation Hall of Fame Inductee
- 2020 National Changemaker, Military Officers Association of America
- 2022 Jesse Brown Distinguished Leadership Award, NAACP
- 2023 Trailblazer, Center for Women Veterans
- 2023 Honorary Member, Zeta Phi Beta sorority
- 2023 Outstanding Alumna, U.S. Army War College Foundation
- 2024 AFRO Person of the Year
- 2024 Sgt. Sanders H. Matthews Veteran Award, Buffalo Soldiers Association of West Point
- 2024 Distinguished Alumna, Appalachian State University Army ROTC
- 2025 Daughters of the American Revolution Medal of Honor.

=== Education ===
- 1978 Bachelor of Science in Social Studies, Appalachian State University, Boone, North Carolina
- 1981 Master's Degree in Foundations of Education, Troy University, Troy, Alabama
- 1989 Command and General Staff College, Fort Leavenworth, Kansas
- 2001 Master of Strategic Studies, U.S. Army War College, Carlisle, Pennsylvania

== Advocacy for the 6888th Central Postal Directory Battalion ==
In 2015, Cummings read the story of Lieutenant Colonel Charity Adams, the commanding officer of the 6888th Central Postal Directory Battalion, also known as the Six Triple Eight.

Cummings felt drawn to Adams, and researched further into World War II history, to better understand the role and impact of the Six Triple Eight. She noted a lack of widespread recognition of the battalion, despite the crucial work done by its 855 members. The Six Triple Eight was the only all-female multi-ethnic battalion to serve overseas in World War II.

In an interview with Smithsonian Magazine, Cummings shared that the more she understood about the Six Triple Eight's impact, the more she felt compelled to memorialize their place in United States history.

=== Congressional Gold Medal ===
Working as a citizen advocate, Cummings raised funds for a monument commemorating the Six Triple Eight. The monument was erected at Fort Leavenworth, Kansas, in 2018. Cummings also co-produced the documentary TheSixTripleEight: No Mail, Low Morale which was released in 2019.

In 2021, Cummings and a team of volunteers worked with congressional leaders to introduce a bipartisan bill that would award the Congressional Gold Medal to the Six Triple Eight. S.321 was introduced by U.S. Senator Jerry Moran (R-Kan.) and co-sponsored by Congresswoman Gwen Moore (WI-04) and Congressman Jake LaTurner (KS-02) in the House. On February 28, 2022, S.321 unanimously passed the House of Representatives, 422–0.

On March 14, 2022, President Joe Biden signed into law the Six Triple Eight Congressional Gold Medal Act of 2021. On April 29, 2025, Speaker of the House Mike Johnson presented the Six Triple Eight Congressional Gold Medal at the U.S. Capitol to more than 300 of the unit's descendants.

Cummings stated that awarding the Congressional Gold Medal to the Six Triple Eight honored their service as "trailblazers".

=== Ongoing advocacy ===
Cummings continues to advocate on behalf of the Six Triple Eight and its living members. She serves as the historical advisor for the forthcoming Broadway musical, Six Triple Eight, and as tour historian for the 6888th Legacy Tour (hosted by Stephen Ambrose Historical Tours) which retraces the steps of the Six Triple Eight and other major World War II sites.

== A Soldier's Life ==
In 2025, University of Virginia Press published Cummings' memoir, A Soldier's Life: A Black Woman's Rise from Army Brat to Six Triple Eight Champion.
