= Fannie McClendon =

American military officer

- Born: September 22, 1920 (age 106); Louisiana
- Military career
- Allegiance: United States
- Branch: Women's Army Corps, U.S. Air Force
- Service years: 1942–1945, 1950–1971
- Rank: Major
- Awards: Congressional Gold Medal

Fannie Griffin-McClendon (born 22 September 1920) is an American retired military officer. McClendon served in the 6888th Central Postal Directory Battalion during World War II, then went on to become a major and squadron commander in the U.S. Air Force.

In March 1945, the 6888th Central Postal Directory Battalion, was sent to Birmingham, England, becoming the only Women's Army Corps battalion formed entirely of Black women to serve overseas during World War II. McClendon, at that time a first lieutenant, helped the battalion to organize mail delivery in the European Theater.

In 1949, McClendon was invited to join the U.S. Army, but instead chose to join the newly-formed U.S. Air Force. She served as a supply officer with the Strategic Air Command, and in 1957 was given command of the 509th Services Squadron, becoming one of the first women to command an all-male squadron.

McClendon retired from the military in 1970. In 2025 she, along with the other members of the 6888th, received a Congressional Gold Medal. As of June 2025, she was the last surviving member of the battalion.
