= Arthur J. Gregg =

US Army general (1928–2024)

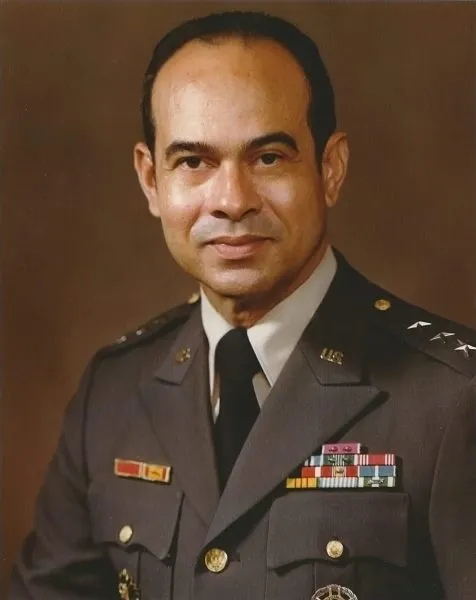
- Gregg in 1977
- Born: May 11, 1928; Florence County, South Carolina, U.S.
- Died: August 22, 2024 (aged 96); Richmond, Virginia, U.S.
- Burial place: Arlington National Cemetery, Arlington, Virginia, U.S.
- Education: Saint Benedict College (BA)
- Military career
- Branch: United States Army; Quartermaster Corps
- Service years: 1946–1981
- Rank: Lieutenant general
- Commands: Deputy Chief of Staff, Logistics (DCSLOG); Director of Logistics (J-4) Office of Joint Chiefs of Staff, Deputy Chief of Staff for Logistics, HQ USAEUR & Seventh Army, Commander, European Exchange System, Nahbollenbach Army Deport, Germany, 96th Quartermaster Direct Support Battalion, Vietnam
- Awards: Defense Distinguished Service Medal; Army Distinguished Service Medal; Legion of Merit w/ 3 Oak Leaf Clusters

Arthur James Gregg (May 11, 1928 – August 22, 2024) was an American military officer who on July 1, 1977, became the first African American in the U.S. Army to reach the rank of lieutenant general. Previously, he was the first African American brigadier general in the U.S. Army Quartermaster Corps on October 1, 1972. He served in the U.S. Army for over 30 years with his final assignment as the Army's Deputy Chief of Staff (Logistics) and retired on July 24, 1981.

In 2022, the United States Department of Defense announced that Fort Lee outside of Petersburg, Virginia, would be renamed Fort Gregg–Adams to honor both Gregg and Lt. Col. Charity Adams Earley. An important criterion in the redesignation process was to select individuals whose career amplifies and corresponds to the installation being renamed. Gregg was a career logistician who was assigned to Fort Lee many times during his career. Adams supported the Adjutant General Corps (as a WAC). Fort Gregg-Adams is the center and home of logistics and sustainment for the U.S. Army. Gregg attended the renaming ceremony on April 27, 2023, and became the first living person in modern American history to have a U.S. military institution named after him.

== Early life and education ==
Arthur James Gregg was born about 10 miles from Florence, South Carolina, on May 11, 1928. He went to elementary school near Florence. He attended high school in Newport News, Virginia, where he lived with his eldest brother and his family.

After graduation from Huntington High School in Newport News, Virginia, Gregg briefly served in the US Merchant Marine (for only two weeks due to sea sickness) and studied at the Chicago College of Medical Technology to become a laboratory technician with a goal to open his own clinic. He was told by the faculty that he would not be allowed to treat white patients during any of his schooling. Realizing this would impair his chances to succeed, he decided to join the Army to gain some medical experience.

He was a 1964 graduate of Saint Benedict College in Atchison, Kansas, where he graduated Summa Cum Laude with a Bachelor of Science Degree in Business Administration. The Army allowed him to obtain this degree following his attendance at the Army Command and General Staff College in 1964. He was also a graduate of the Army War College (1968) and the Executive Program in National Security at Harvard University.

== Military career ==
Gregg enlisted in the US Army in January 1946 and completed his Basic Training at Camp Crowder, Missouri. Following Basic Training, he shipped out to Germany to await his follow-on assignment. But, he was not assigned to any unit at the replacement center. While waiting for an assignment, he was asked to join the 3511th Quartermaster Truck Company at Staffelstein, Germany. He was immediately made the company supply sergeant and he began a small clinic for Black soldiers. In December 1946, he joined the 510th Military Police Platoon in Mannheim, Germany, and was assigned as the unit's supply sergeant. He remained with the unit until October 1949. By this time he had decided to make a career in the Army and he applied for Officer Candidate School.

He graduated from Officer Candidate School on May 19, 1950, at Fort Riley, Kansas. Shortly after his commissioning, he attended Quartermaster Basic Officer Course at Fort Lee, Virginia, and graduated from it in November 1950. Following graduation, he was assigned to the Quartermaster Leadership school where he taught leadership and methods of instruction. He became the school's operation officer and assisted in expanding the curriculum.

In 1953, Gregg was assigned to the 403rd Quartermaster Depot in South Korea as the Troop Information and Education Officer. He also coordinated the Depot's Armed Forces Assistance to Korea program. Following this tour, he reported to Camp Hakata, Japan, to become the Post Quartermaster. He was later appointed Commander of the Headquarters Detachment at Camp Hakata.

Returning from Japan in 1956, Gregg served as an adviser to several Army reserve units in Pennsylvania, including a Quartermaster Group, an Armored Battalion, and a Military Police Battalion. Following this assignment, he attended the Quartermaster Advanced Officer's Course at Fort Lee and graduated in 1959. In his class of 50 students, six would become general officers during their careers.

In November 1959, Gregg was assigned to the 95th Quartermaster Battalion in Nuremberg, Germany. He first served as Company Commander for the 3764th Quartermaster Direct Support Company and later served as the battalion Operations Officer. Following this assignment, he attended the Army's Command and General Staff College at Fort Leavenworth, Kansas, graduating in 1964. Immediately following this, the Army gave him the opportunity to finish his bachelor's degree at Benedict College.

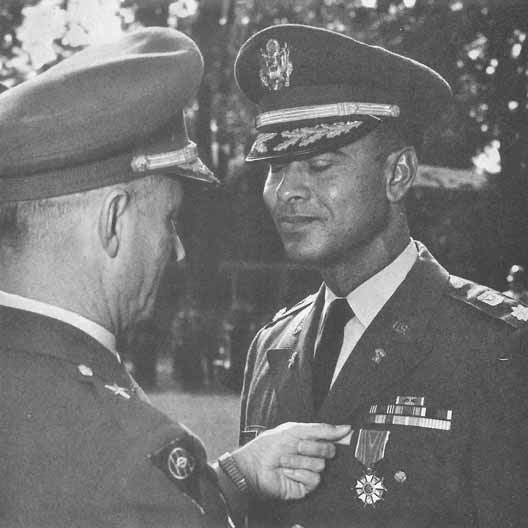
Lieutenant Colonel Arthur Gregg receiving his Legion of Merit in 1967

Gregg's next assignment was with the headquarters of the U.S. Army Materiel Command Headquarters in Washington D.C. He served as a logistics plans officer and moved on to serve as the Assistant Secretary to the General Staff. In January 1966, he was given command of the 96th Quartermaster Direct Support Battalion at Fort Riley, Kansas. After a brief period of intensive training, the battalion deployed to Cam Rahn Bay, Vietnam. In 1967, the battalion became one of the largest in the Army with a strength of more than 3,700 officers and men. The battalion was awarded the Meritorious Unit Citation for the period July 1966 – June 1967. Gregg was awarded the Legion of Merit for his performance as battalion commander.

Gregg returned to the U.S. in May 1967 and attended the Army War College at Carlisle Barracks, Pennsylvania. Upon graduation, he was assigned to the Joint Petroleum Office, Logistics Directorate J-4, Headquarters U.S. European Command, where he had primary staff responsibility for the interface between U.S. and NATO petroleum logistics.

In February 1970, Gregg assumed command of the Nahbollenbach Army Depot at Idar-Oberstein, Germany. Later, in the same year, he directed the consolidation of this army depot and the Giessen Army Depot into a single depot complex. According to his oral history, he spent more time dealing with disciplinary problems (endemic to the Army in the early 1970s) at this 800-man unit than he did with this 3,700-man unit in Vietnam.

In June 1971, he was assigned to the Office of the Deputy Chief of Staff for Logistics, Department of the Army. He served as deputy director of the Troop Support Directorate, and later as the Director. In this position, he oversaw national policy and operation of Army commissaries, troop feeding, laundry and bath, and provisions for individual clothing and equipment. On October 1, 1972, he was promoted to Brigadier General. Following this, he was appointed deputy director of Supply and Maintenance Directorate, Office of the Deputy Chief of Staff for Logistics, Department of the Army.

In April 1973, he returned to Europe as Commander, European Exchange System based in Munich, Germany. He remained at this post until December 1975, when he was appointed Deputy Chief of Staff for Logistics Headquarters, United States Army Europe and Seventh Army. On April 1, 1976, he was promoted to Major General.

In 1977, President Jimmy Carter selected Gregg to be the Director for Logistics for the Joint Chiefs of Staff and approved Gregg's promotion to Lieutenant General, which made Gregg the first African American three-star general in the US Army.

His final assignment came in 1979 when he was selected to be the Deputy Chief of Staff for Logistics, Department of the Army. As such, he directed Army logistics operations around the world. His focus during his tenure was on supporting new weapon systems coming online and improving supply performance in the Army. He retired on July 24, 1981.

== Military awards ==
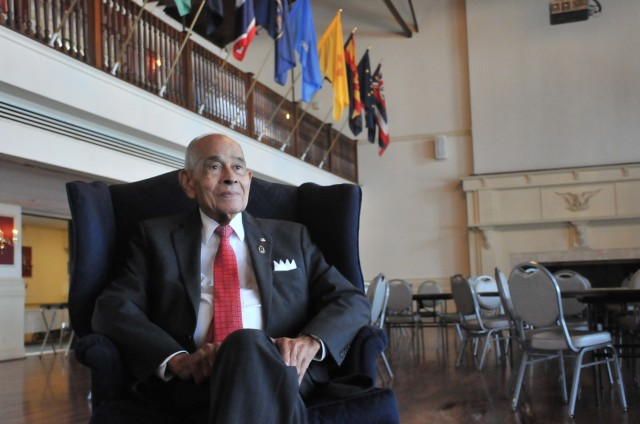
Lieutenant General Arthur J. Gregg (retired) in 2023 sitting in the Gregg-Adams Club, Fort Gregg-Adams, Virginia

General Gregg's military awards include the Defense Distinguished Service Medal, Army Distinguished Service Medal, Legion of Merit (with 3 Oak Leaf Clusters), Joint Service Commendation Medal, the Army Commendation Medal (with 2 Oak Leaf Clusters), the Joint Chiefs of Staff Identification Badge and the Army General Staff Identification Badge.

Defense Distinguished Service Medal
Army Distinguished Service Medal
Legion of Merit with three oak leaf clusters
Joint Service Commendation Medal
Army Commendation Medal with two oak leaf clusters

Joint Chiefs of Staff Identification Badge
Army General Staff Identification Badge

== Honors ==
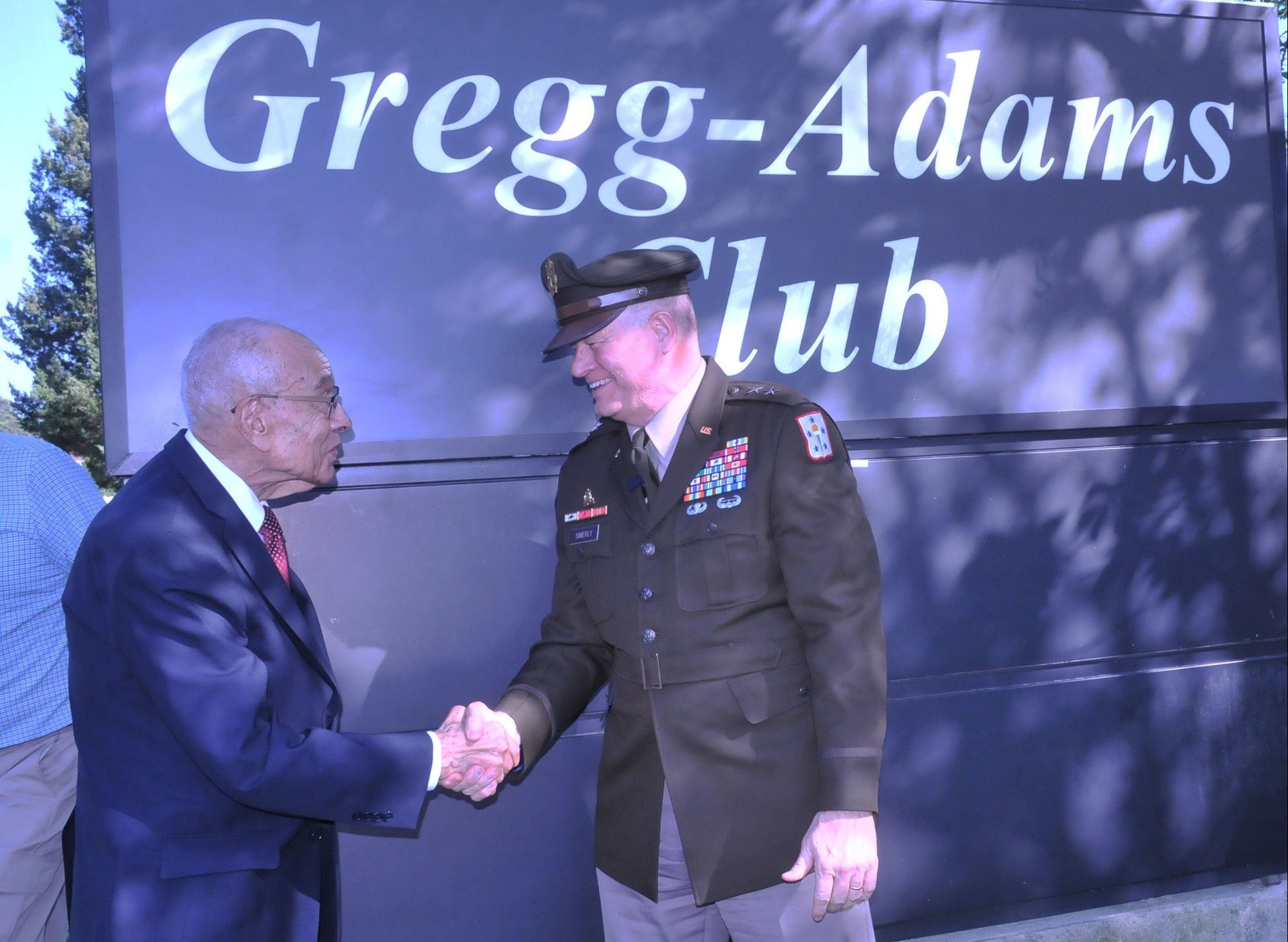
Gregg with Maj. Gen. Mark Simerly in front of the newly named Gregg–Adams Club in 2023

The Department of the Army established in 2015 the Arthur J. Gregg Sustainment Leadership Award which is presented annually to recognize leaders in the U.S. Army who have made significant and measurable contributions to the Army's logistics operations. General Gregg was the eponymous first recipient of the award given in 2016.

Since the early part of the 21st century, Excelsior University annually awards its Arthur J. Gregg Award to a graduating active duty military service member who demonstrates outstanding academic achievement and outstanding career or professional achievement at each commencement ceremony.

In 2022, The Naming Commission announced that Fort Lee in Virginia would be renamed Fort Gregg–Adams in honor of General Gregg and Lieutenant Colonel Charity Adams Earley. The military installation was officially redesignated on April 27, 2023. (In June 2025, the name was again changed to Ft. Lee, but this time to honor Buffalo Soldier Private Fitz Lee, a Spanish–American War veteran who, under enemy fire, rescued wounded soldiers in Cuba, earning him the Medal of Honor.)

== Personal life ==
Gregg married Charlene McDaniel in 1950, and they were together until her death in 2006. He and his wife had two daughters, and he had another daughter from a different relationship. Though initially raised Methodist, his father subsequently converted to the Catholic faith, and Gregg joined him as a teenager.

Gregg died at a hospital in Richmond, Virginia, on August 22, 2024, at the age of 96.
