= Anna Mae Robertson =

American Army officer (1924–2025)

- Born: Anna Mae Wilson; March 5, 1924; Sledge, Mississippi, U.S.
- Died: May 30, 2025 (aged 101); Milwaukee, Wisconsin, U.S.
- Military career
- Allegiance: United States
- Branch: Women's Army Corps
- Service years: 1943–1945
- Rank: Private first class
- Unit: 6888th Central Postal Directory Battalion
- Conflicts: World War II
- Other work: Nursing assistant at VA Medical Center

Anna Mae Robertson (née Wilson; March 5, 1924 – May 30, 2025) was a United States Army officer who served in the Women's Army Corps during World War II. She was a member of the 6888th Central Postal Directory Battalion, the only all-African American, all-female unit to be deployed overseas during the war. The battalion played a crucial role in maintaining troop morale by clearing a massive backlog of undelivered mail in Europe.

Born in Sledge, Mississippi, Robertson joined the Women’s Army Corps in 1943 at age 19. After basic training, she served with the 6888th Battalion, deployed to England and later France. The unit operated under segregation, facing racism and sexism while tackling demanding wartime tasks.

The 6888th managed and delivered millions of accumulated mail pieces across Europe. Working around-the-clock shifts, Robertson and her colleagues processed nearly 65,000 pieces per shift, completing the task ahead of schedule. Their work earned praise but went largely unrecognized by the U.S. government and public for decades.

In later years, she was recognized when the U.S. Congress awarded the 6888th Battalion the Congressional Gold Medal in 2022. She died in 2025 at 101, one of the last surviving members of the Six Triple Eight.

== Early life ==
Anna Mae Wilson was born on March 5, 1924, in Sledge, Mississippi, and raised in Osceola, Arkansas. Her early years were influenced by the economic and social challenges of the Great Depression, during which she and her family worked on farms to survive. Like many African American families in the rural South, they encountered systemic racial discrimination and limited access to education and economic opportunities.

Following the death of her mother and the absence of her father, she and her brother Zeredee Griffin were raised by various relatives, moving between households during their formative years. This instability and the absence of her parents forced Wilson to develop a strong sense of independence and perseverance from a young age.

== Military service ==
Robertson enlisted in the Women’s Army Corps (WAC) in March 1943 at the age of 19. She completed basic training at Fort Des Moines, Iowa, one of the first training facilities to accept African American women into the U.S. Army. She later trained at Fort Oglethorpe, Georgia. Like other Black servicewomen at the time, she faced segregation within the military and was often assigned to all-Black units with limited advancement opportunities.

In early 1945, Robertson was selected to join the newly formed 6888th Central Postal Directory Battalion, known as the "Six Triple Eight." The battalion consisted of over 850 Black women who were tasked with clearing a massive backlog of undelivered mail to U.S. troops stationed in Europe. The unit deployed to Birmingham, England, where it worked under harsh conditions, including poorly lit warehouses, inadequate heating, and the constant threat of German V-1 and V-2 rocket attacks.

The backlog included an estimated 17 million pieces of mail. Working in three shifts around the clock, Robertson and her fellow WACs sorted and redirected approximately 65,000 pieces of mail per shift. Although the Army estimated it would take six months to complete the task, the battalion cleared the backlog in just three months. Their efforts were essential to maintaining troop morale and ensuring communication between soldiers and their families.

Following the success in Birmingham, the 6888th was sent to Rouen and later Paris, France, to continue similar operations. The unit remained overseas until the end of the war. Robertson was honorably discharged from the U.S. Army in December 1945.

== Post-war life ==
Robertson relocated to Milwaukee, Wisconsin, in 1946, where she married John D. Robertson in 1948. The couple had eight children. She worked as a nursing assistant at the Clement J. Zablocki Veterans Affairs Medical Center and participated in civil rights activism, including open housing marches led by James Groppi in the 1960s.

== Recognition ==
In 2022, the 6888th Central Postal Directory Battalion was awarded the Congressional Gold Medal for its service. Robertson was one of the last surviving members of the unit and received the award personally. She was also featured in oral history collections and public awareness campaigns highlighting women veterans.

== Death ==
Robertson died on May 30, 2025, in Milwaukee, Wisconsin, at the age of 101.

== See also ==
- 6888th Central Postal Directory Battalion
- Women's Army Corps
- African Americans in World War II
