= Tough Love (web series) =

- Created by: Caleb Davis; Roni Simpson
- Written by: Roni Simpson
- Directed by: Caleb Davis
- Starring: Ebony Obsidian; Jordan Ryan Barton; Natalie Jacobs; Verina Banks; Bradley Clarke; Devin Coleman; Dorien Wilson
- Composers: Will Rosati; TaRasha Riles
- Country of origin: United States
- Original language: English
- No. of seasons: 3
- No. of episodes: 18

Production
- Executive producer: Caleb Davis
- Producers: Roni Simpson; Jordan Ryan Barton; Verina Banks; Antoine Braxton; Brian Scott; TaRasha Riles
- Production company: Creative Direction Group

Original release
- Network: YouTube
- Release: November 10, 2015 – present

Tough Love is a web series that premiered on YouTube on November 8, 2015. The series started as a micro budget project that eventually attracted more than 45,000 unique viewers with over 1 million channel views.

Tough Love received three nominations at the New York Web Fest in 2016. It was nominated for a Daytime Emmy Award in 2017 for Outstanding Digital Daytime Drama Series.

== Plot ==
Tough Love follows six millennials in New York City as they navigate dating and life's other challenges.

== Cast ==
=== Series regulars ===
- Ebony Obsidian as Alicia Davis
- Jordan Ryan Barton as Quincy Scott
- Natalie Jacobs as Monica Lee
- Verina Banks as Jordan Samuels
- Bradley Clarke as Jackson Thomas
- Devin Coleman as Darius Wilson

=== Guest ===
- Dorien Wilson as Dr. Singleton

== Reception ==
Tough Love has over 1 million views on YouTube. Essence named it as one of the "7 Best Black Web Series of 2016", and Maurita Salkey of Revolt called the series' characters "unforgettable".

Tough Love has been praised by Ebony, Blavity, and BRIC TV.

=== Awards and nominations ===
Year	Award	Category	Nominee(s)	Result	Ref.
2016	NYC Web Fest	Best Drama	Ebony Obsidian, Jordan Ryan Barton, Natalie Jacobs, Verina Banks, Bradley Clarke, Devin Coleman	Nominated	
2016	NYC Web Fest	Outstanding Achievement, Cinematography	Caleb Davis	Nominated	
2016	NYC Web Fest	Best Supporting Actress	Verina Banks	Nominated	
2017	44th Daytime Creative Arts Emmy Awards	Outstanding Digital Daytime Drama Series	Caleb Davis, Roni Simpson	Nominated	
