= The Six Triple Eight =

2024 film by Tyler Perry

- Promotional poster
- Directed by: Tyler Perry
- Written by: Tyler Perry
- Based on: "Fighting a Two-Front War" by Kevin M. Hymel
- Produced by: Keri Selig; Carlota Espinosa; Tony Strickland; Angi Bones; Nicole Avant; Tyler Perry
- Starring: Kerry Washington; Ebony Obsidian; Dean Norris; Sam Waterston; Oprah Winfrey
- Cinematography: Michael Watson
- Edited by: Maysie Hoy
- Music by: Aaron Zigman
- Production companies: Tyler Perry Studios; Mandalay Pictures; Intuition; Her Excellency Productions
- Distributed by: Netflix
- Release dates: December 6, 2024 (United States); December 20, 2024 (Netflix)
- Running time: 127 minutes
- Country: United States
- Language: English
- Budget: $70 million

The Six Triple Eight is a 2024 American war drama film written and directed by Tyler Perry on the 6888th Central Postal Directory Battalion, an all-black, all-female battalion, in World War II. It is based on the article "Fighting a Two-Front War" by Kevin M. Hymel. The film's ensemble cast includes Kerry Washington, Ebony Obsidian, Milauna Jackson, Shanice Shantay, Sarah Jeffery, Pepi Sonuga, Gregg Sulkin, Susan Sarandon, Dean Norris, Sam Waterston, Kylie Jefferson, Moriah Brown, and Oprah Winfrey.

The Six Triple Eight had a limited theatrical release on December 6, 2024, then began airing on Netflix on December 20. The film received mixed reviews from critics. Its historical accuracy was criticised by military historian Dick Cole, who identified numerous departures from the historical record, including the depiction of trench warfare in Italy and the portrayal of racial segregation, and argued that its exaggerated portrayal of racist characters diminished rather than strengthened its treatment of the discrimination faced by the 6888th. Its song, "The Journey", was nominated for Best Original Song at the 97th Academy Awards. The film was nominated for and won five awards at the 56th NAACP Image Awards, including Outstanding Motion Picture and acting wins for Washington, Obsidian, and the ensemble cast.

== Plot ==
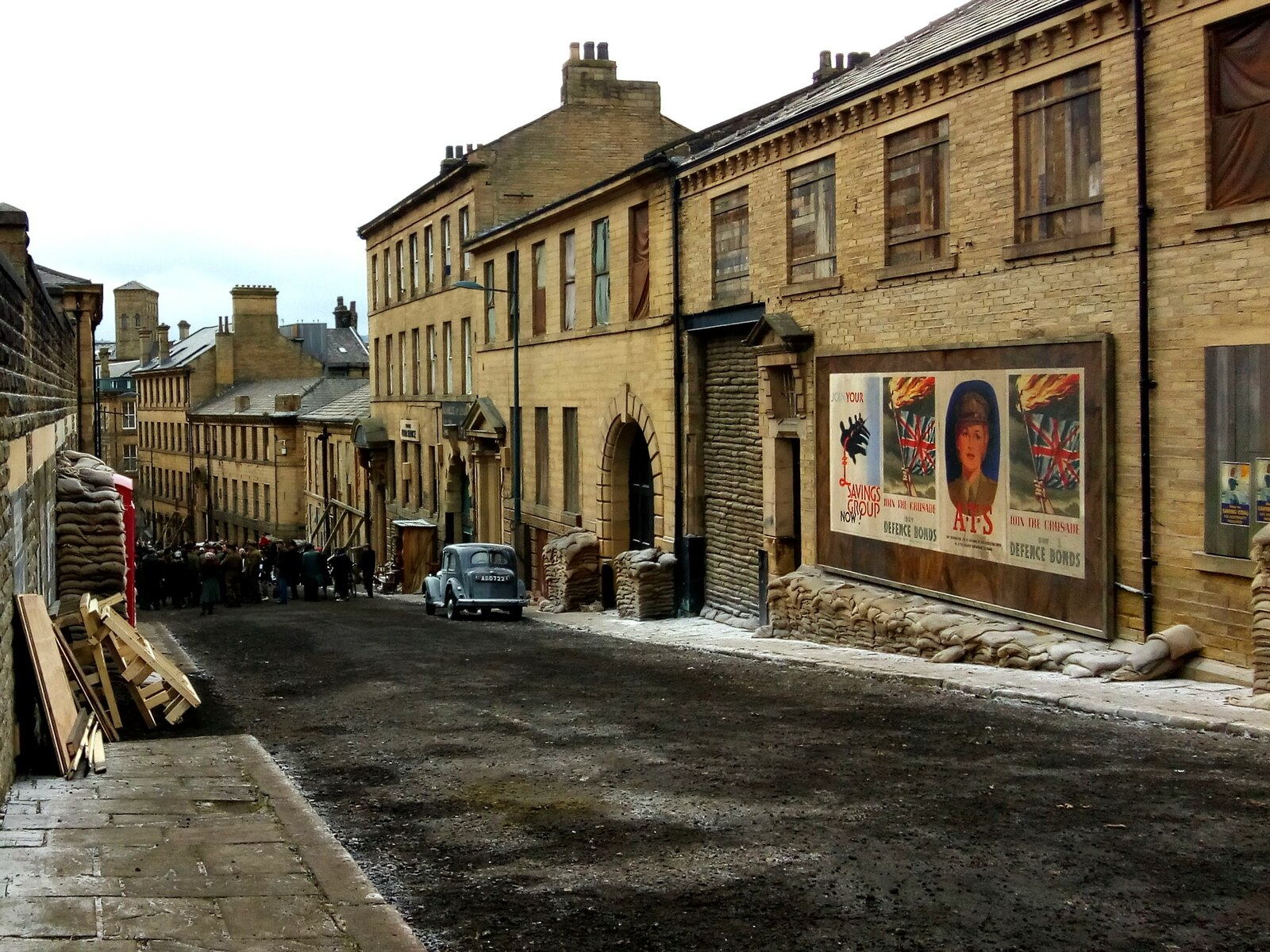
Filiming location in Little Germany, Bradford (February 16, 2023)

A West Virginian mother waits daily for news from her two sons serving overseas while childhood friends Lena and Abram face the difficulty of their budding romance (Lena is black and Abram is Jewish) in 1940s Philadelphia. Abram, on notice for deployment, promises Lena's mother he will come to her house and court Lena properly after the war. When Abram is killed in action as a fighter pilot, the heartbroken Lena enlists after graduating from school. She befriends other enlistees on the train to Georgia for basic training.

Captain Charity Adams Earley and Lieutenant Abbie Noel Campbell train the recruits but the battalion is not deployed overseas. The West Virginian mother convinces First Lady Eleanor Roosevelt that mail from relatives overseas is severely delayed. President Franklin D. Roosevelt discusses the issue at a meeting with Mary MacLeod Bethune in attendance and learns supply shipments have been prioritized over mail, leaving millions of letters and packages piled up in Britain. Clearing the backlog has become a logistical nightmare that several units have been unable to resolve, including a white Women's Army Corps (WAC) unit. Bethune insists the black WAC unit commanded by Adams can do it.

The battalion travels to Glasgow aboard Île de France without naval escort. Once ashore the racist commanding officer, General Halt, forces them to march through the city to a disused, rat-infested, unheated boarding school. The newly-promoted Major Adams and Captain Campbell are given six months to turn the school into a post office and barracks, and clear the two-year backlog of undelivered mail, a deadline intended to ensure their failure.

The battalion establishes liveable quarters, a pristine mess hall, and an efficient mail sorting hall. Lena loses her composure watching nonchalant handling of dog tags found in damaged letters, breaks down and confides to her friends her connection to Abram. Memories of not receiving any of his letters makes her appreciate how important their job is. Her friends promise to watch for letters addressed to her, and Major Adams tells Lena that her story has also made her realize the importance of their work.

The battalion learns their first two months of sorted mail was undeliverable, and is asked to host black soldiers at a dance to boost morale. Lena sees Hugh there, whom she had met previously at the 6888th's training base in Georgia. They start to dance, but she leaves upon hearing a song she associates with Abram. They decide to be friends.

When white officers discover that letters are occasionally opened, the battalion's members respond by describing the challenges they face, such as multiple instances of identical names, multiple locator cards for soldiers as their units move, rats damaging the packages, and mold from care packages from home destroying addresses. The same day that a letter from Abram to Lena is found, two women of the 6888th are killed by an unexploded bomb after ignoring the directions of a traffic warden. After their burial at Brookwood Cemetery, Lena visits Abram's grave, where she reads his letter. In it, he tells her to live a long life and she finally receives closure.

Lieutenant General Halt visits the battalion, delivers a harsh critique, and declares Major Adams incompetent. When he announces his intent to replace her with a white male officer, Adams responds, "Over my dead body" and confronts him. The soldiers who witness the exchange remain at attention until she returns to release them for duty, at which point they give her a rousing ovation. General Halt, working on Major Adams' court martial, hears cheers from his unit as their mail finally arrives. The 6888th has succeeded in eliminating the two-year backlog of 17 million pieces of mail in just 90 days. The unit is sent to Rouen, France, to clear a similar backlog. After the war, Lena marries Hugh and enjoys a long life with him.

Decades later, Michelle Obama oversees a ceremony honoring the 6888th Central Postal Directory Battalion. On April 27, 2023, the U.S. Army renamed Fort Lee as Fort Gregg-Adams to honor Adams, making it the first U.S. military base named for a black woman. (Note: In June 2025, Fort Gregg-Adams was re-renamed to Fort Lee, for Private Fitz Lee, a Buffalo Soldier and Spanish-American War veteran who shared a name with the Confederate general Robert E. Lee.)

== Cast ==
- Kerry Washington as Major Charity Adams Earley
- Ebony Obsidian as Lena Derriecott Bell King
- Dean Norris as General Halt
- Sam Waterston as Franklin D. Roosevelt
- Oprah Winfrey as Mary McLeod Bethune
- Susan Sarandon as Eleanor Roosevelt
- Milauna Jackson as Captain Abbie Noel Campbell
- Kylie Jefferson as Bernice Baker
- Shanice Shantay as Johnnie Mae Burton
- Sarah Jeffery as Dolores Washington
- Pepi Sonuga as Elaine White
- Sarah Helbringer as Mary Kathryn
- Jay Reeves as Private Hugh Bell
- Jeanté Godlock as Vera Scott
- Moriah Brown as Inez Bright
- Gregg Sulkin as Abram David
- Donna Biscoe as Emma Derriecott
- Baadja-Lyne Odums as Susie
- Jeffery Thomas Johnson as Colonel Davenport
- Nick Harris as Chaplain Clemens
- Austin Nichols as Collins

== Production ==
It was announced in December 2022 that Tyler Perry would write and direct the film Six Triple Eight for Netflix. The film is based on historian Kevin M. Hymel's article, "Fighting a Two-Front War", published in the February 2019 issue of WWII History magazine. In January 2023, the cast, including Kerry Washington, Sam Waterston, Susan Sarandon, and Oprah Winfrey was announced, with Washington also joining as an executive producer.

Filming began on January 17, 2023, in Atlanta. Production also occurred in Little Germany, Bradford, and at Imperial War Museum Duxford in February. Filming took place in Cedartown, Georgia, on March 28, 2023. The Six Triple Eight had a budget of $70 million, making it Perry's largest and most expensive production to date.

=== Music ===
The Six Triple Eight (Soundtrack from the Netflix Film) was released digitally on December 6, 2024, through Netflix Music. The album consisted of the film score composed by Aaron Zigman, in his eleventh collaboration with Perry, and jointly produced by Zigman, Perry and music supervisor Joel C. High. The film's end credits song, "The Journey" written by Diane Warren and performed by H.E.R., was nominated in the category of Best Original Song at the 97th Academy Awards.

== Release ==
In February 2024, The Six Triple Eight was reported to be part of Netflix's 2024 release calendar, with a specific date yet to be announced. In August 2024, Netflix announced that the film, now titled The Six Triple Eight, would be released in a limited theatrical release on December 6, 2024, with a streaming release two weeks later on December 20 on Netflix.

The Six Triple Eight amassed 52.4 million views over its first four weeks on Netflix becoming Tyler Perry's most-watched film on the service to date. The historical drama has also boosted viewership for Perry’s four other Netflix films, Mea Culpa, A Jazzman's Blues, A Madea Homecoming, and A Fall from Grace by more than 45% since The Six Triple Eight began streaming on Dec. 20. Plus, the film reached the Top 10 in more than 85 countries, the most of any film he’s made for the streamer.

== Reception ==
=== Critical reception ===
On the review aggregator website Rotten Tomatoes, 55% of 55 critics' reviews are positive, with an average rating of 5.4/10. The website's consensus reads: "The Six Triple Eight recounts an important true story with a steely Kerry Washington at command, but its treacly presentation unfortunately doesn't let these inspiring events speak for themselves." Metacritic, which uses a weighted average, assigned the film a score of 51 out of 100, based on 14 critics, indicating "mixed or average" reviews.

Film critic Peter Debruge from Variety gave it a positive review, writing: "The Six Triple Eight gives Perry his best and most substantial feature to date (only 2010's ensemble melodrama For Colored Girls comes close)... The film boasts a large enough cast to launch a dozen or so careers, and yet, one performance stands head and shoulders above the others: That would be Washington's forceful turn as Adams, who holds her own against arrogant white officers." Frank Scheck from The Hollywood Reporter also gave it a positive review, praising Obsidian and Washington's performances. Jesse Hassenger from The Guardian gave it 2/5 stars, writing: "Kerry Washington hams it up in the writer-director's stodgy ode to a battalion of women in the second world war who deserve far better".

Alison Willmore of New York gave the film a negative review, writing that, in attempting to give the 6888th “their belated due onscreen,” it becomes “more about what they endured than about what they accomplished.” Willmore described the film as a “clunky excuse for a war movie” and criticised its heavy-handed treatment of the battalion's experiences.

=== Accolades ===
Award	Date of ceremony	Category	Recipient(s)	Result	Ref.
Academy Awards	2 March 2025	Best Original Song	"The Journey" – Diane Warren	Nominated	
African-American Film Critics Association	February 19, 2025	Beacon Award	Nicole Avant	Honored (Note: Also for The Black Godfather)	
Black Reel Awards	February 10, 2025	Outstanding Lead Performance	Kerry Washington	Nominated	
Black Reel Awards	February 10, 2025	Outstanding Original Song	"The Journey" – Diane Warren; Performed by H.E.R.	Won	
Celebration of Cinema and Television	December 9, 2024	Icon Award	Tyler Perry	Won	
Hollywood Music in Media Awards	November 20, 2024	Original Score – Feature Film	Aaron Zigman	Nominated	
Hollywood Music in Media Awards	November 20, 2024	Best Original Song – Feature Film	"The Journey" – Diane Warren; Performed by H.E.R.	Won	
NAACP Image Awards	February 22, 2025	Outstanding Motion Picture	The Six Triple Eight	Won	
NAACP Image Awards	February 22, 2025	Outstanding Actress in a Motion Picture	Kerry Washington	Won	
NAACP Image Awards	February 22, 2025	Outstanding Supporting Actress in a Motion Picture	Ebony Obsidian	Won	
NAACP Image Awards	February 22, 2025	Outstanding Breakthrough Performance in a Motion Picture	Ebony Obsidian	Won	
NAACP Image Awards	February 22, 2025	Outstanding Ensemble Cast in a Motion Picture	The cast of The Six Triple Eight	Won	
Satellite Awards	January 26, 2025	Best Original Song	"The Journey" – Diane Warren	Nominated	
Society of Composers & Lyricists Awards	February 12, 2025	Outstanding Original Song for a Dramatic or Documentary Visual Media Production	"The Journey" – Diane Warren	Won	
DAR National Defense Night Awards	June 28, 2025	DAR Media and Entertainment Award	Tyler Perry Studios	Won	

== Controversies ==
=== Historical accuracy ===
Military historian Dick Cole, editor of the Air Force Public Affairs Association newsletter News and Notes, criticised the film's historical accuracy. Cole, who stated that he had worked as a military historian and an adviser to motion picture production companies during the making of three military films, wrote that there was "much to find wrong with Perry's The Six Triple Eight." He argued that Perry was attempting to create a film similar to Hidden Figures, with both films depicting Black women succeeding in traditionally male fields while confronting racism and sexism. However, Cole concluded that The Six Triple Eight "falls well short of that level of tone, authenticity and historical truth."

Cole identified several specific historical inaccuracies. He criticised the opening battle sequence, arguing that "there was no trench warfare in WWII like that depicted in the film, particularly in Italy". He also noted that the film depicts Lena Derriecott attending a non-segregated school in 1942 and entering an interracial relationship at a time when anti-miscegenation laws remained in force in almost every state. Cole argued that these alterations weakened rather than strengthened the film's treatment of racism, writing: "including these untruths in a period drama makes the true racism that the women face in the film less important than it should be and easier to disregard." He added that a more historically accurate treatment "would have increased the importance of what the 6888th achieved 80 years ago."

Cole was particularly critical of the film's depiction of racial conflict. He described the fictional General Halt, played by Dean Norris, as representing "all the racist military men that the 6888th came across during their time in the Army", and argued that "each and every bad white person in the movie—all with heavy Southern accents—is so cartoonishly awful that it's almost funny at times." He stressed that the racism experienced by the real women was serious, but argued that the film's caricatured treatment diminished the historical material rather than strengthening it.

Cole's strongest criticism concerned what he regarded as the film's misplaced emphasis. He wrote that the film's mail operation was "just a task" and that "the real conflict is at home", with the story consequently focusing on the women's struggle against racial discrimination in the United States. He argued that Perry was "more concerned with showing those degrading and minimizing moments than the exceptional achievement of the 6888th", despite the battalion completing its six-month assignment in only three months. Cole also criticised the film for omitting non-commissioned officers almost entirely, arguing that this "neglected the importance of and contributions of NCOs to the accomplishment of the mission."

Cole ultimately argued that the film's strongest material was precisely the part most closely connected to the battalion's documented historical achievement: the women devising a system to process the 17 million pieces of undelivered mail. He wrote that Kerry Washington's performance "saved the premise of the movie" and that her scenes conveyed what the film "should've been all about"—the 6888th's accomplishment in clearing the enormous backlog while facing expectations of failure from racist military officials.
