= American Skin (film) =

2019 film by Nate Parker

- Release poster
- Directed by: Nate Parker
- Written by: Nate Parker
- Produced by: Mark Burg; Tarak Ben Ammar; Lukas Behnken; Zak Tanjeloff
- Starring: Nate Parker; Omari Hardwick; Theo Rossi; Shane Paul McGhie; Milauna Jackson; Beau Knapp
- Cinematography: Kay Madsen
- Edited by: Billy Weber
- Music by: Henry Jackman
- Production companies: TM Films; Tiny Giant Entertainment
- Distributed by: Vertical Entertainment
- Release dates: September 1, 2019 (Venice); January 15, 2021 (United States)
- Running time: 89 minutes
- Country: United States
- Language: English
- Budget: $5 million
- Box office: $282,332

American Skin is a 2019 American drama film written and directed by Nate Parker. It stars Parker, Omari Hardwick, Theo Rossi, Shane Paul McGhie, Milauna Jackson, and Beau Knapp, and follows a Marine veteran who works as a school janitor to give his son a private school education. After he and his son are racially profiled and his son fatally shot, his killer, a police officer is not charged. The father takes matters into his own hands.

The film had its world premiere at the 76th Venice International Film Festival on September 1, 2019, and was released in the United States on January 15, 2021, by Vertical Entertainment.

== Plot ==
Lincoln Jefferson, a recently divorced U.S. Marine (and Iraqi War veteran), gets a job working as a janitor at a mostly white private school, which enables him to get his son, Kajani Jefferson, into the school so that he does not have to suffer the same fate as other black students.

Late one night, after picking his son up from a friend's house in a prestigious, all-white neighborhood, they are pulled over by police. During the traffic stop, which is recorded on body and dashcams, Kajani is shot and killed in front of his father, Jefferson, by officer Mike Randall.

One year later, a documentary film crew, led by student filmmaker Jordin King, requests an interview with Jefferson at the same time as the Grand Jury's decision on the guilt or innocence of Officer Randall is due to be televised. As officer Randall is cleared of all wrongdoing and it is announced there will not be a trial, violence erupts into the city. A police captain pleads with Kajani's grieving mother asking her to make a public statement calling for calm.

After watching Kajani's mother Tayana make a statement on television, Jefferson decides to take matters into his own hands. He takes the police captain hostage and brings him to the precinct along with the film crew. The film crew is horrified, but Jefferson suggests to them that now they can make a real documentary. Jefferson and his veteran friends easily subdue the police station and take everyone inside hostage. Jefferson demands the trial his son Kajani was earlier denied and a mock trial is then staged. Prisoners and civilians are pressed into serving on the makeshift jury, which leads to a lot of argument and discussion regarding racial relations and tensions. Jefferson allows everyone the right to speak freely during the trial.

Officer Randall then admits racial bias on his part and that he pulled Jefferson and Kajani over because they were black in an affluent neighborhood after midnight. He then admits to shooting Kajani because he was scared for his life and that was what he was trained to do. The jury deliberates briefly and finds Randall guilty; Jefferson decides to mete out the punishment himself. He gives Randall his phone and allows him one last phone conversation with his wife and child, before putting a gun to Randall's head and threatening to execute him.

Just as Jefferson pulls the trigger, it is revealed that his weapon has been empty all along and Randall's life is spared. A moment of quiet resolution between Randall and Jefferson then takes place, before Jefferson is shot by a sniper while leaving the police station. The film ends with various talking heads speculating on the motives for the invasion.

== Cast ==
- Nate Parker as Lincoln Jefferson
- Omari Hardwick as Omar Scott
- Larry Sullivan as Clay Dwyer
- Theo Rossi as Officer Dominic Reyes
- Beau Knapp as Officer Mike Randall
- Michael Warren as Melvin
- Shane Paul McGhie as Jordin King
- Milauna Jackson as Tayna Jefferson
- Brighton Sharbino as Megan
- Sierra Capri as Kai
- Ceyair Wright as Jonah

== Release ==
The world premiere of American Skin was held at the 2019 Venice Film Festival on September 1, 2019. In December 2020, Vertical Entertainment acquired US distribution rights to the film. It was released in select theaters in the United States and on premium video on demand (PVOD) on January 15, 2021. The film began streaming on BET+ on April 15, 2021.

Over its first two weeks of release, the film finished in the top 10 on FandangoNow, Google Play, and Spectrum's PVOD rental charts. On February 5, 2021, Vertical announced the film had made $4 million, a record for the studio.

=== Critical response ===
On the review aggregator website Rotten Tomatoes, the film holds an approval rating of 35% based on 20 reviews, with an average rating of 4.8/10. Metacritic assigned the film weighted average score of 24 out of 100, based on 10 critics, indicating "generally unfavorable" reviews.

IndieWire's David Ehrlich described the film as "like a cross between Frank Capra and Tommy Wiseau" and stated that it "is so bad that [Parker] deserves to be canceled on artistic grounds alone", giving it a D grade. Xan Brooks at The Guardian raised the issue surrounding director Nate Parker's previous controversial acquittal of a rape while he was a student at Pennsylvania State University, and found the film to be "clotted, so strident and so thickly cloaked in self-pity that its impassioned story risks becoming worryingly self-serving. This interpretation isn't helped by Parker's decision to cast himself in the leading role of Linc Jefferson, a noble hero driven to breaking point by a miscarriage of justice."

Justin Chang of the Los Angeles Times also raised the issue of the controversy surrounding the movies of Parker and Polanski being shown at the Venice Film Festival and in his review called American Skin "a clumsy facsimile" of a film. Parker addressed his past rape controversy during a press conference at the Venice Festival, saying that his "response during that time obviously left a lot of people frustrated and angered a lot of people and I apologize to them. I am still learning and growing."

Alonso Duralde from The Wrap wrote that "American Skin is a clunky, heavy-handed film that takes a pressing contemporary issue and flattens it under two genres the writer-director seems ill-equipped to handle — the mockumentary and the courtroom drama", adding that "There's certainly an idea for a movie here, but it's one that's undercut at nearly every turn, from the straw-man/mouthpiece arguments Parker's script puts into the mouths of most of the characters (including policemen and convicts alike) to the film's periodic abandonment of the student-footage gimmick".

There was some positive feedback for the film. The Hollywood Reporter reported that American Skin was cheered by the Venice audience and received a seven-minute standing ovation. Owen Gleiberman of Variety said, "It's a good movie: tense, bold, angry, empathetic, provocative, observant, morally engaged... The script – is what I associate with a certain kind of powerful playwriting, as in a drama like 12 Angry Men. The dialogue of is searing, forceful, edge-of-the-brain topical." Elisabeth Sereda of the Golden Globe Awards hailed American Skin as "a lesson in race relations in a country with a current government that is not famous for knowing or caring much about this topic." Sereda wrote: "The film is anything but predictable, and its message is far from the usual cliché we hear on the news."

Korey Coleman of Double Toasted said the film felt like a cheaply made college film about racism. He also said the writing had no subtlety and reminded him of comment sections in social media websites.

=== Accolades ===
On September 7, 2019, American Skin was voted the "Best Film" in the Sconfini Section of the Venice Film Festival, becoming the first American film based on the theme of racial injustice to be awarded the prize.
