= Romay Davis =

African-American World War II veteran (1919–2024)

Romay Davis (née Johnson; October 29, 1919 – June 21, 2024) was a member of the 6888th Central Postal Directory Battalion, the only all-Black, all-female unit to serve overseas during World War II. In 2022, the Congressional Gold Medal was awarded to the 6888th in recognition of its members' contributions. Davis was one of the Battalion's last surviving members.

== Biography ==
Davis was born on October 29, 1919, and grew up in Virginia with her five brothers. At the start of World War Two, she worked for the United States Mint. She joined the Women's Army Corps in 1943 and was one of 855 women who served in the United States Army's 6888th Central Postal Directory Battalion, the only predominantly all-black US Women's Army Corps unit sent overseas during World War II. She was first deployed to England after departing New York City for a transatlantic crossing that caused many of her battalion to get seasick. Once in England, the battalion sorted a large backlog of mail, and then the group moved to France to sort mail that had accumulated there. Her primary role was as a driver, though she did also sort mail. Davis returned to the United States in November 1945 and was honorably discharged from the Army. In the years that followed, she moved to New York City where she graduated from New York's Traphagen School of Fashion with funding from the G.I. Bill, and worked for the company Glen of Michigan as a designer for over thirty years. At the age of 61, Davis returned to school at New York University and earned a master's degree in technology and industrial education.

Davis earned a second degree black belt in Taekwondo, after starting karate at the age of 73.

At the age of 81, Davis started working in a Winn-Dixie grocery store. In 2020, its parent company, Southeastern Grocers, Inc., initiated the Romay Davis Belonging, Inclusion and Diversity Grant with the goal of funding minority-supporting organizations.

Davis turned 101 in 2020, and the city of Montgomery, Alabama, honored her with a parade and declared her birthday "Romay Davis Day". The town had previously celebrated her 100th birthday.

Romay Davis married Jerry Davis, whom she met in New York City when he worked for the New York City subway system. She died in Montgomery, Alabama on June 21, 2024, at the age of 104.

== Awards and honors ==
In 2022, Davis received the Congressional Gold Medal in recognition of her services in the United States Army. In the press events that followed, Davis was asked why she served, and she replied "It's my country too".
