= Gladys Carter =

American soldier

Gladys Schuster Carter
- Died: June 30, 2009; Chesapeake, Virginia, US

Gladys Schuster Carter was one of 885 women who served in the 6888th Central Postal Directory Battalion of the Women's Army Corps (WAC) during World War II, helping to process backlogged mail in the European theatre.

Carter served for two years in the WAC, from February 1943 to November 1945. and achieved the rank of Private First Class. She was a founding member of the local chapter of the National Association of Black Military Women in Greater Hampton Roads, Virginia.
