= Lena Derriecott Bell King =

Member of the 6888th Central Postal Directory Battalion

Corporal Lena Derriecott Bell King
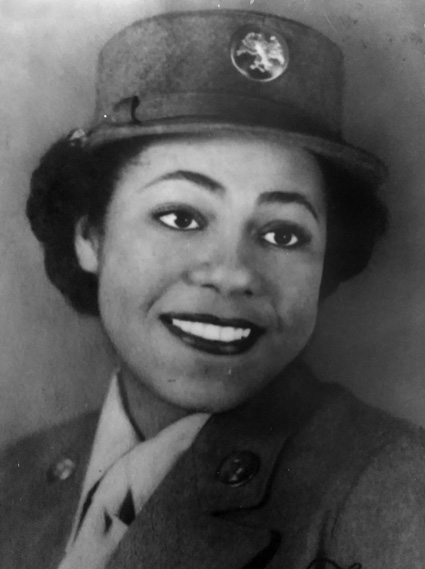
- Army photograph of Lena Derriecott
- Born: Lena Derriecott; January 27, 1923; Atlanta, Georgia
- Died: January 18, 2024 (aged 100); Las Vegas, Nevada
- Spouse: Hugh T Bell (m. 1944)
- Military career
- Allegiance: United States of America
- Branch: United States Army
- Service years: 1943 - 1948
- Unit: 6888th Central Postal Directory Battalion
- Known for: Being a member of the only all-Black, all-female unit to serve overseas in WWII, helping deliver a massive backlog of undelivered mail to U.S Soldiers.
- Awards: US Congressional Gold Medal

Lena Derriecott Bell King (January 27, 1923 – January 18, 2024) was an American soldier who was a member of the 6888th Central Postal Directory Battalion, the only all-Black, all-female unit to serve overseas during World War II. Known as the "Six Triple Eight", this battalion played a critical role in maintaining morale for U.S. troops in Europe by clearing a massive backlog of undelivered mail. In 2022, the Congressional Gold Medal was awarded to the 6888th in recognition of its members' contributions. King was one of the Battalion's last five surviving members.

== Early life and education ==
Lena Derriecott was born on January 27, 1923, in Atlanta, Georgia. She was raised in Philadelphia, Pennsylvania, by her mother and aunt after her parents divorced. Her mother worked as a caterer for a synagogue and grew vegetables to support their community during tough times. Derriecott attended Germantown High School, where she was an active participant in civic activities, including protesting segregated restaurants through Eleanor Roosevelt's National Youth Administration program.

== Military service ==
In 1943, at the age of 20, Derriecott enlisted in the Women's Army Corps (WAC) of the U.S. Army Air Force. She completed basic training at Fort Des Moines, Iowa, where she learned military procedures and discipline. Afterward, she served as a nurse and later as a fuel officer at Douglas Army Airfield in Arizona. During her time in service, she met and married Hugh T. Bell, a fellow servicemember.

In 1945, Derriecott volunteered for overseas duty and was assigned to the 6888th Central Postal Directory Battalion. The unit's mission was to clear a two-year backlog of mail addressed to U.S. troops stationed in Europe. Operating under harsh conditions in rat-infested warehouses, the battalion worked in three shifts around the clock. Their motto, "No Mail, Low Morale," reflected the critical importance of their work. Despite being given six months to complete the task, the unit cleared 17 million pieces of mail in just three months.

== Challenges and achievements ==
The women of the Six Triple Eight faced racism and sexism both at home and abroad. While stationed in Birmingham, England, Derriecott and her colleagues endured freezing conditions, frequent air raids, and prejudice from some of their male counterparts. However, they were treated more respectfully by the British public, who often welcomed them into their homes.

After successfully clearing the mail backlog in England, the battalion was reassigned to France, where they sorted another accumulation of undelivered mail. Derriecott's time in France further exposed her to the devastation of war, including bombed cities and displaced civilians.

The contributions of the 6888th Battalion went largely unrecognized for over six decades, before receiving widespread acknowledgment. In 2022, the battalion was awarded the Congressional Gold Medal, and King was recognized in a ceremony in Las Vegas. Their story became the subject of the Netflix film The Six Triple Eight, directed by Tyler Perry and featuring Kerry Washington. King was a main character and was portrayed by Ebony Obsidian.

== Later life and legacy ==
After World War II, Derriecott pursued further education in design in Leicester, England, and later settled in the United States. She moved to Los Angeles with her husband, where they raised two children. Derriecott eventually retired as a nurse and spent her later years in Las Vegas, Nevada.

In her 90s, Derriecott became a prominent figure in honoring the legacy of the Six Triple Eight, participating in conferences and interviews to share her story. In 2018 she attended the dedication of a monument honoring the 6888th Battalion at Fort Leavenworth with four other surviving members. In 2019, she was recognized for her service with the 2019 Audie Murphy Award during the nationally televised ceremony of the American Valor Awards.

She died peacefully on January 18, 2024, days before her 101st birthday. Her life and service were celebrated at a memorial service in Las Vegas.
