= Giessen Army Depot =

Former German military airfield

Giessen Army Depot Army Air Forces Station Giessen Advanced Landing Ground Y-84 Flughafen Gießen
- Giessen AD (Germany)

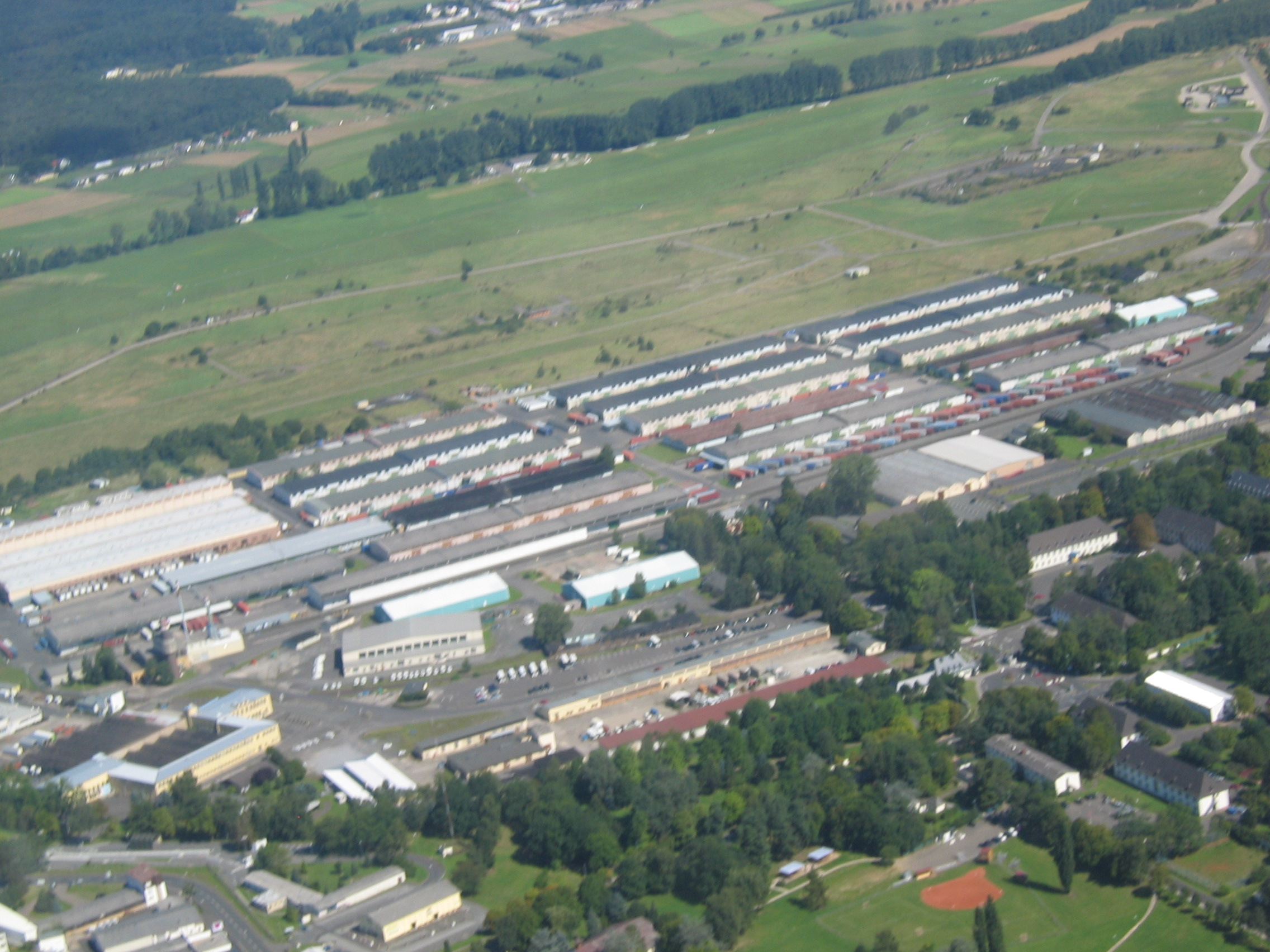
- Aerial view of the US depot in Giessen.

Site information
- Type: Military Garrison

Location
- Coordinates: 50°35′47″N 008°43′41″E

Site history
- In use: 1927-2008
- Battles/wars: Western Front (World War II)

Giessen Army Depot is a former military garrison, located 5.7 km east-northeast of Giessen in Hesse, Germany.

== History ==
The facility opened as a civilian airport in July 1925. The airfield, however, dates to the spring of 1911 when it was first used by biplanes. In 1924, a sports flying event was held at the airfield. In July 1925, Lufthansa operated flights from the new airport to Frankfurt/Main and Kassel. The station building was opened in 1927. Hangars and other buildings began to appear from 1929. In 1933, a beacon was built just off the airfield to facilitate nighttime navigation.

After the establishment of the National Socialist government in 1933, Fliegerhorst Giessen was militarised, and became home to a Combat Wing (Kampfgeschwader 55 (KG-55) "Greif"). The airfield was enlarged and more hangars were built in 1938. Other buildings were marked as commercial warehouses on building plans, masking their use as munitions storage.

United States Army units moved into the Gießen area in April 1945, and designated the airfield as "Advanced Landing Ground Y-84". It was used briefly as a casualty evacuation and combat resupply airfield by the IX Air Service Command, Ninth Air Force. After the German Capitulation on 8 May, it was re-designated as "Army Air Forces Station Giessen".

Army Air Forces units moved out in July, and the facility was taken over by United States Army units, which converted the facility into the Giessen Army Depot, one of the largest depot facilities in Germany, with its own railway system and warehouses. The only known Army Aviation use was the Giessen Army Heliport (Giessen AHP) operated by a detachment of the 503d Combat Aviation Battalion.

The facility was closed as a garrison by the United States in 2008, but remained a distribution center for the Army and Air Force Exchange Service (AAFES).

The last of Giessen Army Depot was relinquished to the city in February 2017, when AAFES relocated its distribution center to Germersheim.
