= Milauna Jackson =

American actress

- Born: Milauna Jemai Jackson; Chicago, Illinois, U.S.
- Other name: Milauna Jemai
- Occupation: Actress

Milauna Jemai Jackson is an American actress. She is best known for her role as DEA Special Agent Kim Martinez in the British-American action television series Strike Back seasons four & five.

== Early life ==
A native of Chicago, Milauna Jemai Jackson was raised on the South Side by her single mother. To study in a safe environment, she lived part-time with her mother and partially with her grandparents. Before enrolling in the performing arts program at Marie Sklodowska Curie Metropolitan High School, she acted in church programs and community theater at a young age. She had her mother Linda and Miss Lillian Monkus (deceased), whom she met in high school, as female role models. Her first television role was in 2000 in the court show Arrest & Trial (episode "Nightstalker") where she played herself. After high school, Jackson attended several colleges; Howard University and Cal State Fullerton, before enrolling at the University of Illinois at Chicago (UIC) where she began to appear in commercials, a Twista video, and industrial films.

== Career ==
In 2002, she moved to Los Angeles to further her career aspirations. In 2012, she enrolled in UCLA and completed her education. During her orientation day she learned that director Spike Lee cast her for an HBO pilot Da Brick, "and that was the last part of my academic year." In 2004, two years later, Milauna Jackson landed a role in the TV series Cold Case (episode "Volunteers"). She also appeared in several TV movies, other TV series and films. She was also a regular member of Squad 85, an American comedy series created by Gregory Bonsignore. It was aired on YouTube's YOMYOMF channel and premiered on November 13, 2012.

A few weeks after her audition for the role of DEA SA Kim Martinez on Strike Back, Milauna Jackson found herself in South Africa for the filming of the show. It was in Johannesburg that the military advisor for the show, Paul Hornsby, put her skills and knowledge in hand-to-hand combat, weapons work and other military techniques to the test. She also has a recurring role on NBC's Aquarius starring David Duchovny, as the wife of David's detective partner, Grey Damon. From 2016 to 2017, she had a recurring role as A.D.A. Rene Atwood in the ABC legal thriller How to Get Away with Murder.

== Filmography ==
=== Film ===
Year	Title	Role	Notes
2000	Brother 2 (Brat 2)		
2000	One Week	Tasha	
2001	Save the Last Dance	Hip Hop Dancer (uncredited)	
2006	The Ties That Bind	Teen Lynne	Short film
2007	Redemption Song	Eva	Short film
2008	Fix	Lawyer's Receptionist	
2008	Grace Hereafter	Sophia Williams	Short film
2010	Blood Done Sign My Name	Willie Mae Marrow	
2010	The Ties That Bind	Nicole	Short film
2019	Adopt a Highway	Detective Minardi	
2019	American Skin	Tayana Jefferson	
2022	A Jazzman's Blues	Citsy	
2024	The Six Triple Eight	Captain Campbell	

=== Television ===
Year	Title	Role	Notes
2000	Arrest & Trial	Herself	Episode: "Nightstalker"
2001	Fear Factor	Herself	Episode 9 season 1
2004	Cold Case	Colette Ferguson (1969)	Episode: "Volunteers"
2006	The Underground	Ensemble	Season 1, Episode 3
2006	Without a Trace	Lucinda Biggs	Episode: "Watch Over Me"
2006	Dexter	Co-ed	Episode: "Shrink Wrap"
2008–2009	Lincoln Heights	Cydelle Glass / Cyd	
2010	FlashForward	Susan	Episode: "Let No Man Put Asunder"
2011	NCIS	Emma Park	Episode: "Dead Reflection"
2011	Rizzoli & Isles	Relita Washington	Episode: "Can I Get a Witness?"
2011	Da Brick	Lynette (2011)	TV movie
2012	Squad 85	Wheels	6 episodes
2013	Quinn and Zin		Episodes: "Jail", "Lawyer"
2013	Strike Back: Shadow Warfare	Kim Martinez / DEA SA Kim Martinez	Main role, 16 episodes
2015-16	Aquarius	Kristin Shafe	Recurring role, 16 episodes
2016–2017	How to Get Away with Murder	A.D.A. Rene Atwood	Season 3; Recurring role (10 episodes)
2018	Chicago P.D	Laila Davis	Episode: "Black and Blue"
2019	FBI	Gina Pratt	Episode: "Identity Crisis"
2019-21	Animal Kingdom	Pam	8 episodes
2020	The Good Doctor	Kerry Gaston	Episode: "Fractured"
2022	Law & Order	Defense Attorney Jackson	Episode: "The System"
