= 6888th Central Postal Directory Battalion =

US Army all-Black women's battalion

6888th Central Postal Battalion
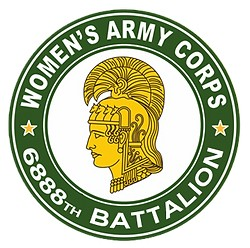
- 6888th Battalion logo
- Active: 1945–1946
- Country: United States
- Branch: United States Army
- Role: Postal service
- Part of: Women's Army Corps
- Nickname: Six Triple Eight
- Mottos: No mail, low morale

Commanders
- Notable commanders: Major Charity Adams

The 6888th Central Postal Directory Battalion, nicknamed the "Six Triple Eight", was a unit of the US Women's Army Corps (WAC) that managed postal services. The only Black and multi-ethnic WAC unit sent overseas during World War II, the 6888th quickly cleared years-long backlogs of undelivered mail to troops in the European Theater of Operations (ETO). In 2019, the U.S. Army awarded the 6888th a Meritorious Unit Commendation.

== History ==
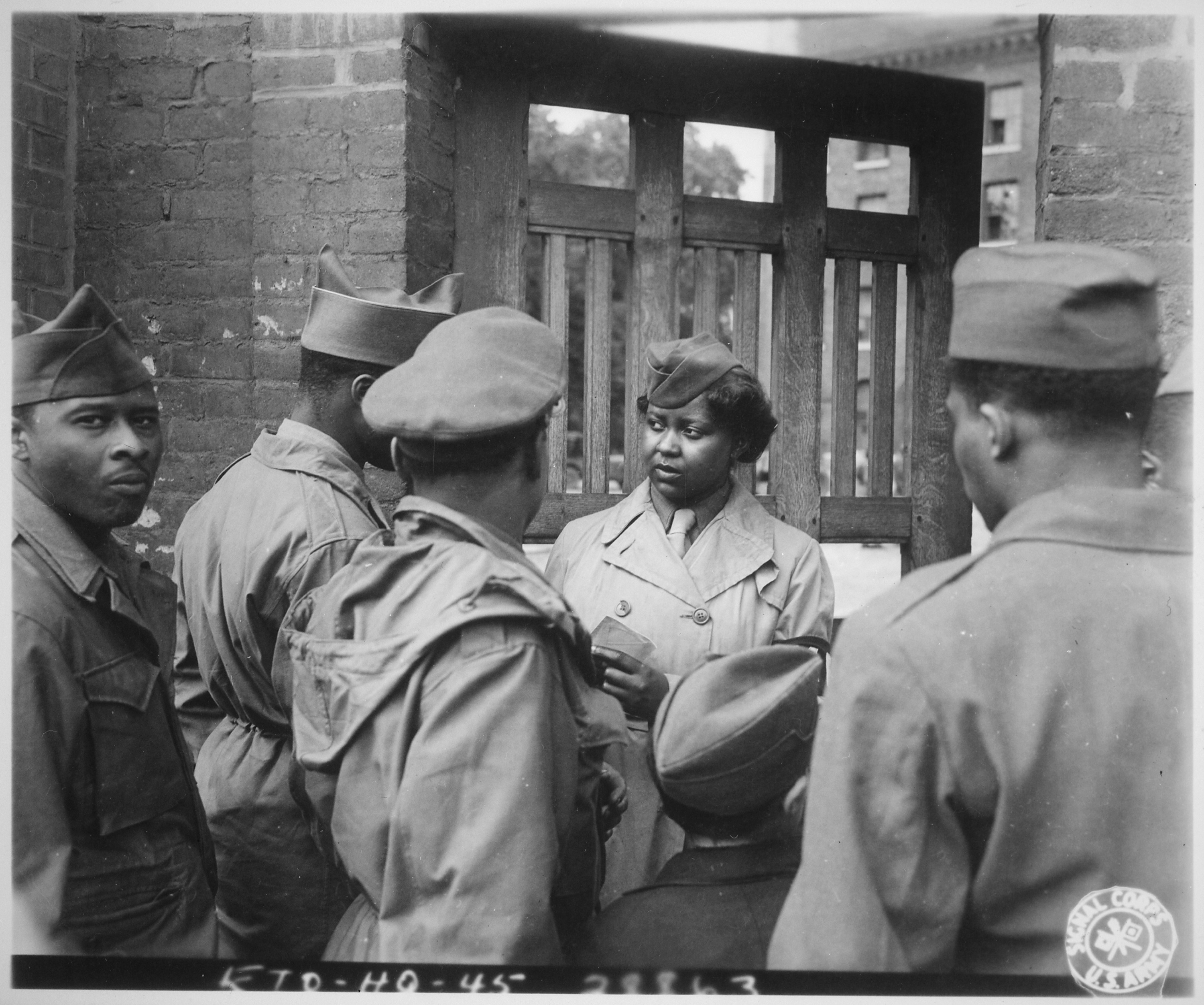
Private Ruth L. James at the gates of the battalion's facility in Rouen during a 1945 "open house" attended by hundreds of other African American soldiers

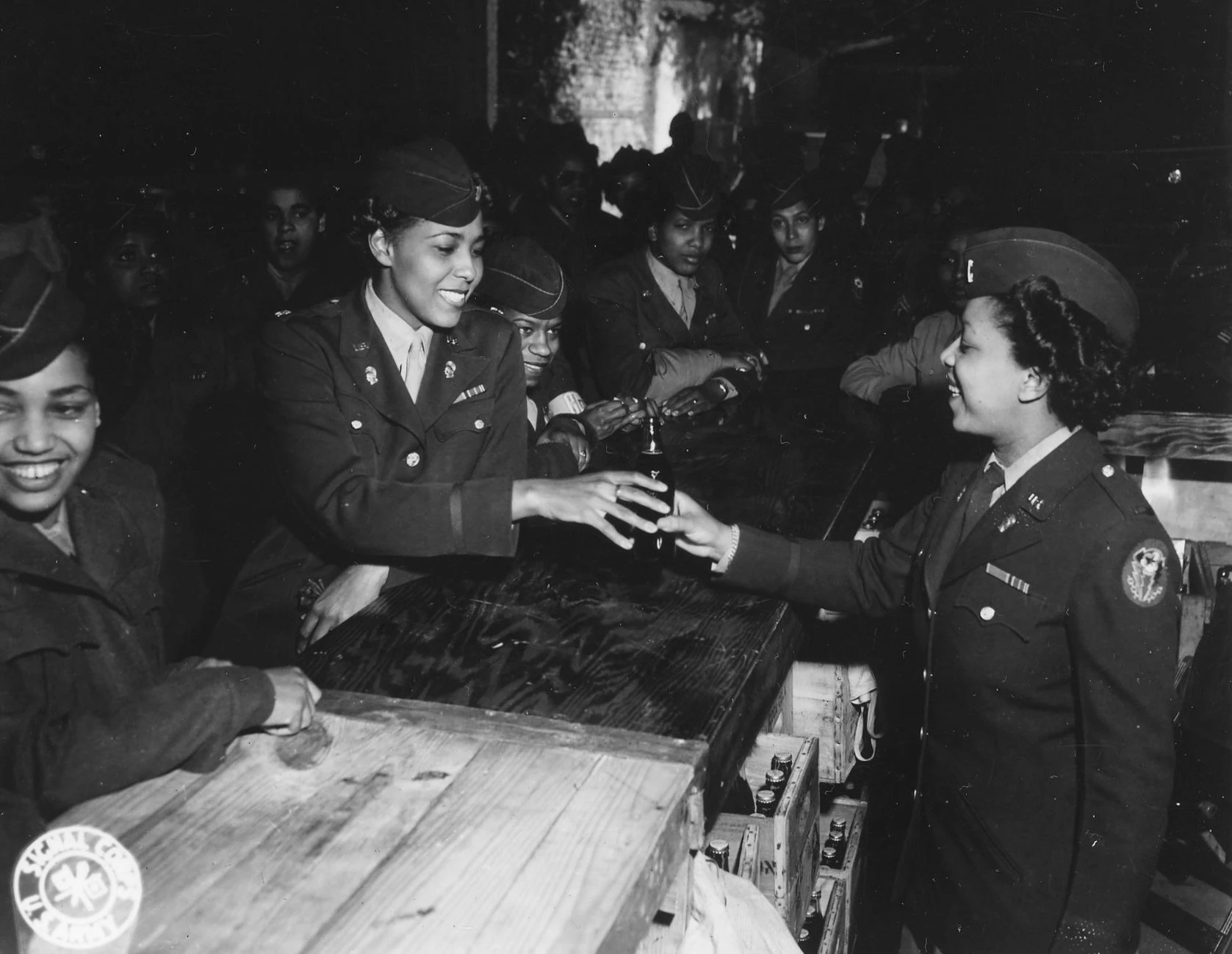
Second Lieutenant Freda le Beau serving Major Charity Adams a soda at the opening of the battalion's snack bar in Rouen

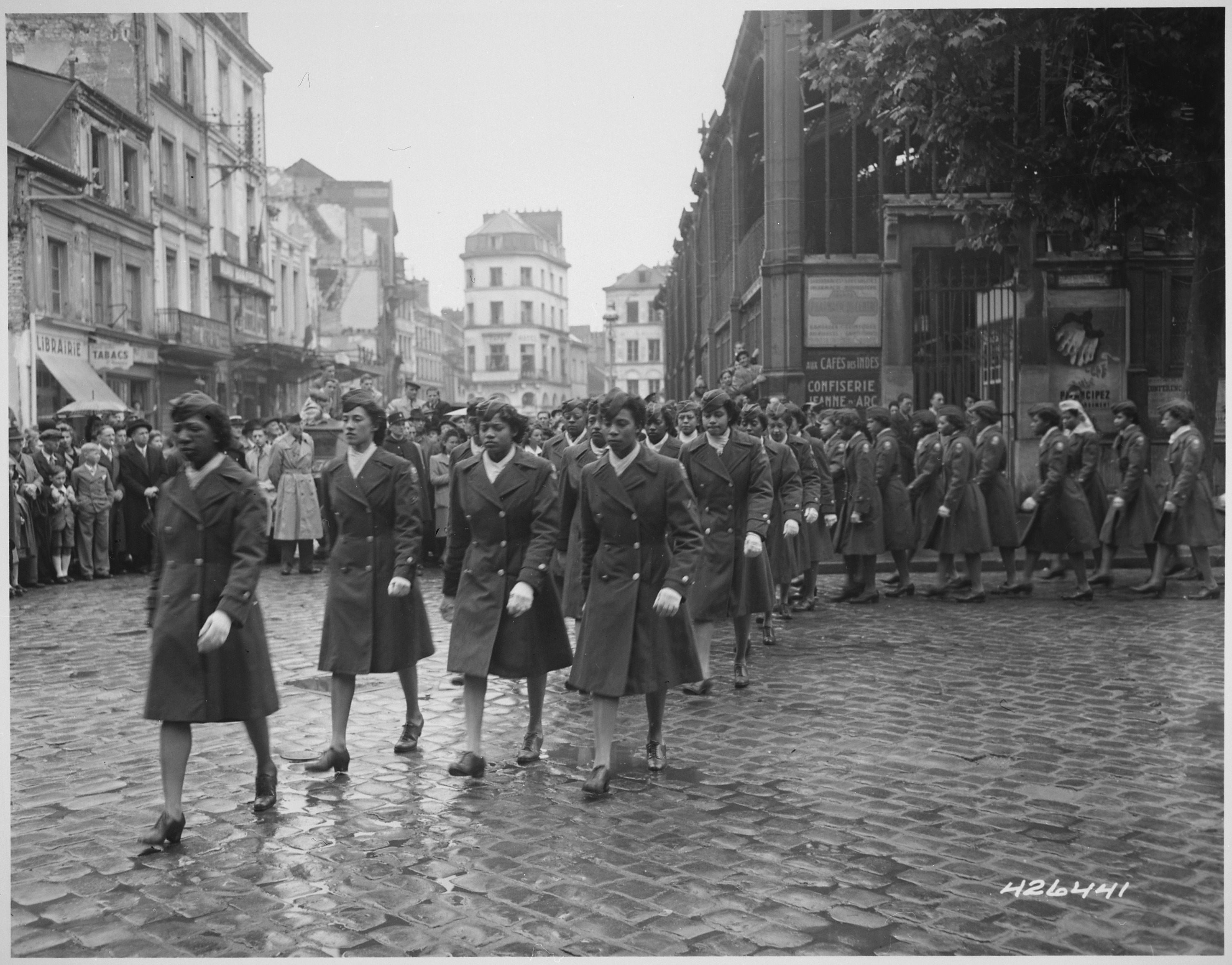
Members of the Battalion in a May 1945 parade honoring Joan of Arc where she had been burned at the stake

6888th Central Postal Directory Battalion African-American WACs, Hull & Cambridge, England, 04/14/1945

During World War II, there was a shortage of soldiers who could manage the postal service for the U.S. Army overseas.

At the same time, Black leaders were calling for the Army, which enforced U.S. policies of segregation, to put Black women to better use in the war effort. In 1944, Mary McLeod Bethune persuaded First Lady Eleanor Roosevelt to help secure "a role for black women in the war overseas." Black newspapers, too, challenged service leaders to "use black women in meaningful Army jobs."

The women who signed up went to basic training in Georgia. Women who were already in the WAC, like Alyce Dixon, served at various locations, including the Pentagon, before they joined the 6888th.

Led by Major Charity Adams, the 855 soldiers of the 6888th were organized into five companies: Headquarters and Companies A, B, C, and D. Most of the troops worked as postal clerks, but others were cooks or mechanics or held other support positions, so that the 6888th was a self-sufficient unit. The unit motto was "No mail, low morale".

=== United Kingdom ===
The 6888th left the United States on February 3, 1945, sailing on the fast liner Île de France and arriving in Greenock near Glasgow on February 12. The Île de France encountered several German U-boats on the trip, forcing the ship to take evasive maneuvers, but reached Scotland safely. The battalion was transported by train to Birmingham. On February 15, the unit was inspected and marched in review before Lt. Gen. John C. H. Lee, Commanding General, Communications Zone, European Theater of Operations (ETO), and Maj. Gen. Robert McGowan Littlejohn, Chief Quartermaster, ETO, whose responsibilities included the mail.

Littlejohn and the Army had failed to develop systems to efficiently handle mail sent to U.S. troops fighting in Europe. When the 6888th arrived in Birmingham, an estimated 17 million undelivered letters and packages were stored in warehouses. Army officials believed the situation was hurting morale.

Upon arriving, the 6888th devised their own system to handle the backlog of mail. Many letters and packages had only the first name of the intended recipient, a commonly used name, or a nickname. The soldiers created and maintained a card index of people with the same or similar names, using military serial numbers to distinguish between them. The index ultimately grew to 7 million cards. The 6888th worked seven days a week in three shifts. Each shift handled an estimated 65,000 pieces of mail.

The battalion lived and worked in temporary wooden buildings at King Edward's School in Edgbaston, which had been requisitioned in 1939 by the British War Office for use by the British and U.S. armies. The unit's 32 officers lived in three houses nearby. Cold weather when they arrived meant the women had to wear coats and extra clothes when working in the unheated temporary buildings.

Because the 6888th was a segregated unit, the women slept and ate in different locations from the white, male soldiers. There was evidence of sexist and racist treatment by male soldiers. Some of the women felt that the European local people treated them better than people did in the United States.

Early in the operation, a general attempted to send an officer to "tell them how to do it right", but Major Adams responded, "Sir, over my dead body, sir!" By the time the same general visited the unit in France, his attitude had changed and he appreciated the 6888th's accomplishments.

A male chaplain working at Birmingham caused problems for Adams, ordering her soldiers to report to his office to help him and be counseled instead of reporting to work, causing them to be considered absent without leave (AWOL). Adams had to "counsel" him to let the women alone, "reminding him that she was in charge of the women's assignments".

The battalion finished clearing the backlog in May 1945, just three months into what had been supposed to be a six-month task.

=== France ===
After the 6888th cleared the backlog in Birmingham, it was sent across the English Channel to Le Havre, France. It arrived on June 8, 1945, one month after VE Day. It traveled by train to Rouen to deal with another backlog of mail, some of whose letters were three years old. The military police in the WAC unit were not allowed to have weapons, so they trained in hand-to-hand combat to keep out "unwanted visitors". The 6888th participated in a parade at the place where Joan of Arc was executed.

By October 1945, the mail in Rouen had been cleared and the 6888th was sent to Paris. They marched through the city and were housed in a luxurious hotel, where they received first-class treatment.

Around this time, the battalion was reduced by 300 women; 200 more were discharged in January 1946.

Three soldiers from the battalion—Mary H. Bankston, Mary Jewel Barlow, and Dolores Mercedes Browne—were killed in a Jeep accident and were buried at the Normandy American Cemetery. Only one other woman is interred there, alongside more than 9,000 men: Elizabeth Ann Richardson, a Red Cross volunteer killed in a Piper Cub plane crash near Rouen in July 1945).

=== Post-war ===
In total, the unit handled mail for over four million military and civilian personnel. In February 1946, the unit returned to the United States where it was disbanded at Fort Dix, New Jersey. There was no public recognition for their service at the time.

== Legacy ==
Members of the 6888th Central Postal Directory Battalion were awarded the European African Middle Eastern Campaign Medal, the Good Conduct Medal, and the World War II Victory Medal during their service.

Decades passed before their unique contributions were formally recognized.

On February 25, 2009, the battalion was honored at the Women in Military Service for America Memorial at Arlington National Cemetery. The event was attended by three former unit members of the 6888th: Alyce Dixon, Mary Ragland, and Gladys Shuster Carter. Dixon and Ragland were also honored by President Barack Obama and First Lady Michelle Obama that same year.

On March 15, 2016, the 6888th was inducted into the U.S. Army Women's Foundation Hall of Fame. (Note: U.S. Army Women's Foundation Hall of Fame, includes partial roster by State) Battalion veteran Elsie Garris attended the induction ceremony.

On November 30, 2018, Fort Leavenworth dedicated a monument to the women of the 6888th. Five women from the battalion attended the ceremony: Maybeel Campbell, Elizabeth Johnson, Lena King, Anna Robertson, and Deloris Ruddock.

In 2019, the U.S. Army awarded the 6888th a Meritorious Unit Commendation.

On May 13, 2019, U.S. Ambassador to the UK Woody Johnson presented a blue plaque to King Edward's School to commemorate the 6888th's achievements in Birmingham. The plaque is on the itinerary of guided tours organised by Birmingham's Black Heritage Walks Network.

On February 12, 2021, U.S. Senators Jerry Moran (R-Kan.) and Jacky Rosen (D-Nevada) introduced bipartisan legislation to award the Congressional Gold Medal to the members of the 6888th. U.S. Representative Gwen Moore (D-Wis.) introduced the companion legislation in the House, where it passed unanimously. President Biden signed the bill on March 14, 2022. Living members of the Battalion were honored in their hometowns.

In April 2023, the U.S. Army's Fort Lee was renamed for Adams and Lt. Gen. Arthur J. Gregg as part of the U.S. Congress' effort to undo 20th-century efforts to name U.S. government assets after figures of the Confederacy. The move made Fort Gregg-Adams the only U.S. Army base named after a female Black soldier. In June 2025, President Donald Trump re-named the base Fort Lee, after Private Fitz Lee, a Buffalo Soldier and Spanish–American War veteran chosen because he shared a surname with the Confederate general.

In 2024 only five members were still living: Gladys E. Blount, Romay Davis, Fannie McClendon, Lena King, and Anna Mae Robertson. Only Fannie McClendon was still living as of June 2025.

== In popular culture ==
The battalion has been the subject of several film and theatre projects. In 2019, the documentary film The SixTripleEight: No Mail, Low Morale directed by historian James Theres was released. Theres suggested to Colonel Edna Cummings, who helped lead an effort to raise a monument to the unit in Fort Leavenworth, that the women should be awarded the Congressional Gold Medal.

In 2022, the story of the 6888th inspired a new musical, with the working title of "6888: The Musical", with Blair Underwood as executive producer.

Tyler Perry wrote, directed, and produced a Netflix film, The Six Triple Eight, based on the 6888th, starring Kerry Washington as Charity Adams. It was released in some cinemas and on Netflix in December 2024. The film received a Metacritic score of 51/100 based upon 14 reviews. It was also nominated for a handful of awards including two Black Reel Awards, one Oscar, one Satellite Award, and five NAACP Image Awards.
