= Charity Adams Earley =

Highest ranking black female officer in the US Army in WWII

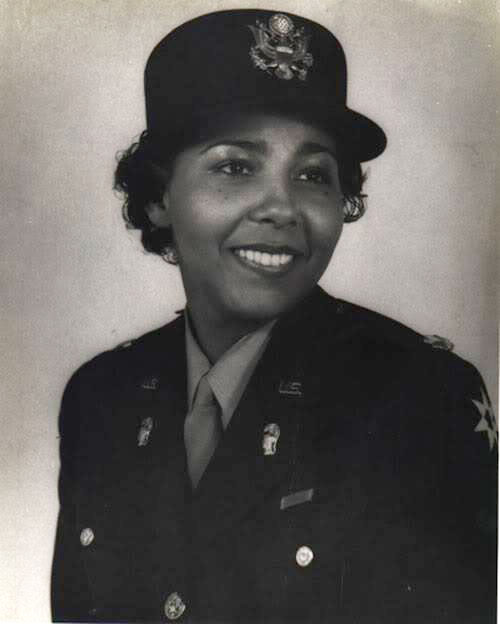
- Born: Charity Edna Adams; December 5, 1918; Kittrell, North Carolina, U.S.
- Died: January 13, 2002 (aged 83); Dayton, Ohio, U.S.
- Burial place: Woodland Cemetery and Arboretum
- Spouse: Stanley A. Earley (m. 1949)
- Military career
- Allegiance: United States
- Branch: Women's Army Auxiliary Corps; United States Army
- Service years: 1942 − 1946
- Rank: Lieutenant colonel
- Units: 3rd Company, 3rd Training Regiment WAAC, Fort Des Moines
- Commands: 6888th Central Postal Directory Battalion
- Awards: Ohio Women's Hall of Fame; The Smithsonian Institution's 100 Most Important Black Women in History; South Carolina Black Hall of Fame; Service to the Community Award; Senior Citizens' Gold Watch Award; Ohio Veterans' Hall of Fame; Honorary doctorates from Wilberforce University and the University of Dayton
- Monuments: Namesake of Fort Gregg-Adams

Charity Adams Earley (née Adams; December 5, 1918 – January 13, 2002) was a United States Army officer. She was the first African-American woman to become an officer in the Women's Army Auxiliary Corps (later WACs) and was the commanding officer of the 6888th Central Postal Directory Battalion, the only African-American and multi-ethnic US Women’s Army Corps (WAC) unit sent overseas during World War II. Adams was the highest-ranking African-American woman in the army by the completion of the war.

A monument honoring her was dedicated at Fort Lee, Virginia, on November 30, 2018. In 2023, the base was renamed Fort Gregg-Adams in honor of Earley and Lieutenant General Arthur J. Gregg, becoming the first U.S. military base to bear the names of African Americans. The base was again renamed in 2025, following Donald Trump's campaign promise to restore the base's Confederate name.

Adams is portrayed by Kerry Washington as a lead character in 2024 film The Six Triple Eight showing the experience of the 6888th Central Postal Directory Battalion during their service in Europe.

== Early life and education ==
Adams was born on December 5, 1918, in Kittrell, North Carolina, and grew up in Columbia, South Carolina. Her parents believed strongly in education and were high achievers. Her father, Eugene Adams, a college graduate, was an African Methodist Episcopal minister and her mother, Charity née Nash Adams, was a schoolteacher. Adams was the oldest of four children. One of her younger brothers, John Hurst Adams, went on to become a Bishop within the AME and founded the Congress of National Black Churches. She graduated from Booker T. Washington High School as valedictorian and from Wilberforce University in Ohio in 1938, majoring in math and physics. Charity Adams Earley was initiated into the Beta chapter of Delta Sigma Theta sorority while attending Wilberforce University. After graduation, she returned to Columbia, where she taught mathematics at the local high school while studying part-time for a M.A. degree in psychology at the Ohio State University, receiving her master's degree in 1946.

== Career ==
Adams enlisted in the U.S. Army's Women's Army Auxiliary Corps (WAAC) in July 1942. She was one of the first African-American women to be an officer in the WAAC. At the time, the U.S. Army was still segregated, so she was placed in a company with fellow female African-American officers and stationed at Fort Des Moines. In 1943, she was assigned to be the training supervisor at base headquarters.

In early 1944, Adams was reassigned as the Training Center control officer in charge of improving efficiency and job training. She also had typical additional duties, such as surveying officer (finding lost property) and summary court officer (handling women's minor offenses).

In December 1944, Adams led the only battalion of Black WACs ever to serve overseas. They were stationed in Birmingham, England. The women began to socialize with the citizens and broke through prejudices on both sides. Adams was put in charge of a postal directory service unit. Another part of her job included raising the morale of women. Adams achieved this by creating beauty parlors for the women to relax and socialize in.

In January 1945, she was appointed the commanding officer of the first battalion of African-American women, the 6888th Central Postal Directory Battalion. They were stationed first in Edgbaston, a suburb of Birmingham, England. Three months later they were moved to Rouen, France, and then to Paris. They were responsible for the delivery of millions of pieces of mail to soldiers during World War II.

By the completion of the war, Lieutenant Colonel Adams was the highest ranking African-American woman in the military. At the conclusion of the war, when asked about her groundbreaking achievements, Adams responded simply: "I just wanted to do my job." After celebrating victory, she left the service in 1946 to continue her education.

=== Fighting segregation and racism in the Army ===
Growing up in the South, Adams experienced the hardships of segregation. When she entered the Army, she still faced discrimination but was not afraid to speak up and fight for desegregation in the Army. One of the first battles Adams fought for equality was when the Army proposed segregating the training regiment. When she was told she would head one of the segregated regiments, she refused. The Army subsequently decided against creating separate regiments.

On another occasion, when a general stated, "I'm going to send a white first lieutenant down here to show you how to run this unit", then-Major Adams responded: "Over my dead body, sir." The general threatened to court-martial her for disobeying orders. She then began to file charges against him for using "language stressing racial segregation" and ignoring a directive from Allied headquarters. They both dropped the matter, and the general later came to respect Adams.

When the Red Cross tried to donate equipment for a new segregated recreation center, Adams refused it because her unit had been sharing the recreation center with white units.

Adams encouraged her battalion to socialize with white men coming back from the front and even the residents of wherever they were stationed. She wanted to create comradeship between enlisted personnel and officers and ease the tensions of racism.

=== Educator ===
After her service in the Army, she earned a master's degree in psychology from Ohio State University. Next she worked at the Veterans Administration in Cleveland, Ohio, but soon left to teach at the Miller Academy of Fine Arts. She moved to Nashville and was the director of student personnel at Tennessee A&I College. She then moved to Georgia and became the director of student personnel and assistant professor of education at Georgia State College. Later she served on the board of trustees at Sinclair Community College in Dayton, Ohio. Dayton Public Schools also named one of their schools the "Charity Adams Earley Girls Academy" in her honor.

=== Community service ===
Adams devoted much of her post-war life to community service. She served on the Board of Directors of Dayton Power and Light, the Dayton Metro Housing Authority, the Dayton Opera Company, the Board of Governors of the American Red Cross, and the Board of Trustees of Sinclair Community College. She volunteered for NAACP, United Way, the United Negro College Fund, the Urban League, and the YWCA. She also co-directed the Black Leadership Development Program.

== Personal life ==
In 1949, Adams married Stanley A. Earley Jr. They moved to Zurich, Switzerland for a time while Stanley completed medical school. In Zurich, Earley spent ten months learning German at the Minerva Institute. Once she mastered the language, she studied for two years at the University of Zurich. Earley attended the Jungian Institute of Analytical Psychology in her second year as well, but she chose not to pursue a degree. They returned to the U.S. in 1952 and settled in Dayton where Stanley worked as a physician. They had two children, Stanley III and Judith Earley.

Adams died at age 83 on January 13, 2002, in Dayton.

== Awards and honors ==
Adams received many honors and awards, including a Woman of the Year from the National Council of Negro Women in 1946, the Top Ten Women of the Miami Valley Dayton Daily News in 1965, and Service to the Community Award from the Ohio State Senate in 1989. In 1987, she received the Senior Citizens Gold Watch Award. She was listed on the Smithsonian Institution's 110 most important historical Black women list, Black Women Against the Odds, in 1982. She was inducted into the Ohio Women's Hall of Fame in 1979 and the Ohio Veterans Hall of Fame in 1993. She was also inducted into the South Carolina Black Hall of Fame and named citizen of the year by The Montgomery County Board of Commissioners in 1991. In 1995, President Clinton gave her public recognition at the groundbreaking of the Military Women's Memorial; located at the entrance to Arlington National Cemetery in Arlington County, Virginia, and in 1996, she was honored by the National Postal Museum. In 1997, Adams was included in the BellSouth African-American History Calendar.

She also received honorary doctorates from Wilberforce University and the University of Dayton in 1991. Dayton Public Schools named one of their all-girls elementary schools in her honor (the "Charity Adams Earley Girls Academy"). On March 22, 2022, President Biden signed legislation awarding Charity Adams and the 6888th Central Postal Directory Battalion the Congressional Gold Medal, the nation's highest civilian honor.

On August 8, 2022, The Naming Commission of the U.S. Department of Defense made recommendations for U.S. Army post name changes for facilities named after Confederate soldiers. Among them was that Fort Lee, Virginia, be redesignated Fort Gregg-Adams, after Lieutenant General Arthur J. Gregg and Lieutenant Colonel Charity Adams Earley. On October 6, 2022, Secretary of Defense Lloyd Austin accepted the recommendation and directed that the name change occur no later than January 1, 2024. The name change officially occurred on April 27, 2023. The base became the first US military fort named for African Americans. In 2025, Fort Gregg-Adams was renamed Fort Lee. President Donald Trump, who had made a campaign promise to restore the bases' Confederate names, announced that the Army would restore the name to "Fort Robert E. Lee" during a June speech. The fort has officially been renamed in honor of Buffalo Soldier Private Fitz Lee, a Spanish-American War veteran who, under enemy fire, rescued wounded soldiers in Cuba, earning him the Medal of Honor.

In October 2023, the Dayton Branch NAACP honored Lt. Col Charity Adams Earley by implementing The Lt. Col. Charity Adams Earley Award of Excellence during its 72nd Dayton NAACP Hall of Freedom Awards. Her daughter, Judi Earley, presented the first award to the Honorable Judge Adele Riley.

On June 12, 2024, the Dayton Veterans Affairs Medical Center honored her by renaming their women's clinic as the “Lieutenant Colonel Charity Adams-Earley Women’s Clinic."

In the 2024 movie The Six Triple Eight, Adams was portrayed by Kerry Washington.

== Works ==
- Earley, Charity Adams (1989). One Woman's Army: A Black Officer Remembers the WAC. Texas A&M University Press. ISBN 0890963754. OCLC 88020181.
