= List of name changes due to the George Floyd protests =

After George Floyd, an unarmed Black American man, was murdered by a white police officer, Derek Chauvin, during an arrest in Minneapolis, Minnesota, on May 25, 2020, many people protested against systemic racism, both in the United States and internationally. During the course of these protests, many monuments and memorials were vandalized or toppled by protestors, prompting those people who were in charge of other similar monuments to remove them from public view. Similarly, many names, mascots, and other controversial forms of symbolism were either changed or removed under direct or indirect public pressure. In other countries, race-related and colonial issues were also raised, and some of them were acted upon. In some cases, changes were already being planned or they had already been under consideration before the outbreak of the protests.

Color code:

Reported but not (yet) executed
Change partially or fully reversed

Abbreviations used:

ES: Elementary school
HS: High school
MS: Middle school
TBD: To be determined

== Education ==
Image	Old	New	Location			Reported	Executed	Details	Ref.
	Sir Francis Drake HS	Archie Williams HS	San Anselmo	CA	US	Jun 1, 2020	May 11, 2021	Sir Francis Drake High School was renamed Archie Williams High School for former teacher and Olympic athlete Archie Williams, after awareness grew of Francis Drake's involvement with the transatlantic slave trade, colonialism and piracy, along with his symbolic connection to the racist ideology of Anglo-Saxonism.	
	P. G. T. Beauregard Hall Leonidas K. Polk Hall	College of Science and Technology College of Education and Behavioral Sciences	Thibodaux	LA	US	Jun 3, 2020		The Nicholls State University president announced the renaming of two buildings on campus named for people associated with the Confederacy who had no relationship to the university.	
Gladstone Hall	Gladstone Hall	Greenbank Hall of Residence	Liverpool	Eng	UK	Jun 9, 2020	Jun 14, 2022	The University of Liverpool announced that it would rename a hall of residence honoring prime minister William Ewart Gladstone, for "his views on slavery".	
	Sir John Cass School of Art, Architecture and Design	School of Art, Architecture and Design	London	Eng	UK	Jun 10, 2020		London Metropolitan University announced that the school's name would no longer refer to Sir John Cass, because of his links to the slave trade.	
	Jefferson ES Washington ES	Ruth Acty ES TBD	Berkeley	CA	US	Jun 10, 2020	Dec 9, 2020 TBD	The Berkeley Unified School District board unanimously voted to rename two elementary schools because of Thomas Jefferson's and George Washington's ownership of slaves. Jefferson ES was renamed after Ruth Acty, the first teacher of color in the Berkeley Unified School District, who dedicated nearly 50 years of her life to teaching.	
	Von KleinSmid Center for International and Public Affairs (USC)	The Center for International and Public Affairs (temporarily) Dr. Joseph Medicine Crow Center for International and Public Affairs	Los Angeles	CA	US	Jun 11, 2020 Nov 18, 2021	Jun 11, 2020 Apr 11, 2022	The executive committee of the board of trustees of the University of Southern California (USC) voted unanimously to remove Rufus B. von KleinSmid's name. Von KleinSmid was the fifth president of USC, an active supporter of eugenics and forced sterilization, and the only West Coast university president who refused to send the transcripts of Japanese American students who were released from World War II internment camps to colleges in other states. In November 2021, USC announced the building would be renamed in honor of alumnus Joseph Medicine Crow, an author, historian, and the last war chief of the Apsáalooke (Crow) Nation. The building was dedicated on April 11, 2022.	
	Durham Hall	Academic Center (temporarily)	Buena Vista	VA	US	Jun 11, 2020		Southern Virginia University (SVU) renamed its primary academic building. (Note: Durham's name was also removed from the building and SVU's web site, and would no longer be used in SVU's publications. SVU administrators had become aware of Durham's views about a week before the renaming, from a social media post in response to a statement condemning racism made by the university roughly a week after the George Floyd protests began.) Robert Lee Durham was a white supremacist who was a co-owner and former president of Southern Seminary, a predecessor of SVU. (Note: Durham was president from 1919 to 1942.) His advocacy of white supremacy was "explicit, public, [and] proactive". (Note: Durham authored and published a novel with white supremacist themes, disenfranchised African American voters, and advocated for white supremacist views with US Congressmembers and other politicians.)	
	Schott Building Schottzie Stadium	n/a	Cincinnati	OH	US	Jun 11, 2020	TBD	The Saint Ursula Academy leadership team decided to rename two of its facilities because of Marge Schott's "record of racism and bigotry." Schottzie was Schott's dog.	
	Calhoun Honors College	Clemson University Honors College	Clemson	SC	US	Jun 12, 2020		Clemson University removed the name of its founder John C. Calhoun from its honors college, for his pro-slavery views and his ownership of slaves.	
	Wildermuth Intramural Center	William Leon Garrett Fieldhouse (Note: The resolution approved by the trustees stated, "The Trustees of Indiana University do hereby approve the naming of the Intramural Center on the IU Bloomington Campus as the William Leon Garrett Fieldhouse." However, the sign in front of the facility itself reads "Bill Garrett Fieldhouse".)	Bloomington	IN	US	Jun 12, 2020		The Indiana University Board of Trustees approved the renaming. (Note: The trustees had actually approved a recommendation to rename the facility to "William L. Garrett-Ora L. Wildermuth Intramural Center" on February 20, 2009. However, the school announced four days later that it would not implement the change because it lacked support from Garrett's family.) The sports facility was formerly named "Wildermuth Intramural Center" after former trustee Ora Wildermuth, but due to his "extraordinarily strong opposition to racial integration," Wildermuth's name was stripped from the facility in 2018. Bill Garrett was the "first black basketball player to regularly play in the Big Ten conference".	
Sir John Cass's Foundation	Sir John Cass's Foundation	The Portal Trust	London	Eng	UK	Jun 16, 2020	Apr 27, 2021	The foundation issued a statement announcing its commitment to a change of name.	
	Sir John Cass Redcoat School	Stepney All Saints School	London	Eng	UK	Jun 16, 2020	c. Aug 19, 2020	The school's governing body voted unanimously for a change of name.	
	Louis E. Plummer Auditorium	Fullerton HS Auditorium	Fullerton	CA	US	Jun 16, 2020	Jun 19, 2020	The Fullerton Joint Union High School District board of trustees unanimously voted to remove Plummer's name from the Fullerton Union High School auditorium. Plummer was a leader of the Ku Klux Klan. An online petition had amassed over 27,000 signatures. The Louis E. Plummer name was removed on June 19.	
	J. J. Finley ES	Carolyn Beatrice Parker ES	Gainesville	FL	US	Jun 16, 2020	Aug 18, 2020	The School Board of Alachua County voted unanimously for the name change. Jesse J. Finley was a Confederate brigadier general. The board unanimously voted to rename the school after Gainesville native Carolyn Beatrice Parker, "the first African American woman in the U.S. to receive a graduate degree in physics", and who worked on the Manhattan Project.	
Award ceremony at Finegan Elementary School Robert E. Lee High School	Joseph Finegan ES Stonewall Jackson ES Jefferson Davis MS Kirby-Smith MS J.E.B. Stuart MS Robert E. Lee HS	Anchor Academy Hidden Oaks ES Charger Academy Springfield MS Westside MS Riverside HS	Jacksonville	FL	US	Jun 16, 2020	Aug 3, 2021	The Duval County School Board unanimously approved the recommendation of the board chair to begin the renaming process. Joseph Finegan, Stonewall Jackson, Edmund Kirby Smith, J. E. B. Stuart, and Robert E. Lee were Confederate generals, and Jefferson Davis was the Confederate president. The name changes were approved in 2021. In 2013, the Board renamed Nathan B. Forrest High School to Westside High School.	
	Daniels MS	Oberlin MS	Raleigh	NC	US	Jun 16, 2020	Jun 16, 2020	Josephus Daniels was a newspaper editor and planner of the Wilmington massacre in which the biracial city government of Wilmington was overthrown by white supremacists. The middle school in Raleigh honoring him was renamed for its location on Oberlin Road.	
	Woodrow Wilson HS	Eastside HS	Camden	NJ	US	Jun 16, 2020	Jan 25, 2022	The school superintendent cited "the segregationist views and ideas of the former president that ... have drastically reshaped his legacy" as the reason for the change.	
	Aycock Residence Hall Carr Building Josephus Daniels Student Stores	McClinton Residence Hall Henry Owl Building Student Stores Building	Chapel Hill	NC	US	Jun 17, 2020	Dec 3, 2021	After the University of North Carolina at Chapel Hill board of trustees lifted a ban on renaming buildings, the university's Commission on History, Race and A Way Forward recommended the removal of four names of white supremacists to the Chancellor. The board temporarily changed the names of Carr Building and Aycock Residence Hall to the Student Affairs Building and Residence Hall 1 respectively; it later voted to rename Residence Hall 1 after Hortense McClinton, the university's first Black professor, and the Students Affairs Building after Henry Owl, the university's first Native American student.	
	Walpole HS Rebels	Walpole HS Timberwolves	Walpole	MA	US	Jun 18, 2020	Apr 29, 2021	The Walpole School Committee voted unanimously to change the school's mascot. More than 150 people participated in a rally for the change. Multiple Change.org petitions had called for the change, amassing over 14,000 signatures in total.	
	Lee Magnet HS	Liberty Magnet HS	Baton Rouge	LA	US	Jun 18, 2020	Aug 3, 2020	The East Baton Rouge school board voted to change the school's name. It was formerly Robert E. Lee HS and then Lee Magnet HS.	
	Galton Lecture Theatre Pearson Lecture Theatre Pearson Building	Lecture Theatre 115 Lecture Theatre G22 North-West Wing	London	Eng	UK	Jun 19, 2020	Jun 19, 2020	University College London renamed two lecture theatres and a building named after eugenicists Francis Galton and Karl Pearson.	
Woodrow Wilson Hall dedication plaque	Woodrow Wilson Hall	Great Hall at Shadow Lawn	West Long Branch	NJ	US	Jun 19, 2020	Jun 19, 2020	Monmouth University's board of trustees unanimously voted to rename the building, after voting to keep it in 2016.	
	Philip J. Schuyler Achievement Academy	Roots Academy at West Hill	Albany	NY	US	Jun 19, 2020	Jul 1, 2023	The City School District of Albany announced that it would form a School Naming Policy Committee to create "a policy regarding the naming and renaming of district buildings and facilities" including that of this elementary school. (Note: The committee was formed in order to "establish an official process to rename [Philip] J. Schuyler Achievement Academy, and to evaluate the history behind each district building's name in order to consider other changes as necessary".) Philip Schuyler was "the largest slave owner in late-1700s Albany County".	
	Stonewall Jackson HS Stonewall MS	Unity Reed HS Unity Braxton MS	Manassas	VA	US	Jun 22, 2020	Jun 30, 2020	The school board voted unanimously to change the names. "Unity" reflected the desire of the community. Carroll Braxton is a Marine veteran of World War II and the Korean War. Celestine Braxton served Prince William County Public Schools for 33 years, and worked to integrate the schools when they were segregated. Arthur Reed was a security assistant at the high school for 20 years who "had a huge impact within the school community" and "loved his school and his students".	
	Christopher Columbus Family Academy	Family Academy of Multilingual Exploration	New Haven	CT	US	Jun 22, 2020	—	The New Haven school board decided to rename the school, "due to [Columbus's] history of violence toward indigenous people."	
	Robert E. Lee HS	John R. Lewis HS	Springfield	VA	US	Jun 23, 2020	Jul 23, 2020	The Fairfax County School Board voted unanimously to rename the school and requested feedback and suggestions from the community. The board voted unanimously to rename the school after recently deceased civil rights leader John Lewis. (Note: The superintendent was directed to change the name by Sep 8, 2020 and a news release stated that the change was "effective for the 2020–21 school year". A letter to the community stated that items were being replaced immediately, and the school's web page had begun switching to the new name on the day of the renaming decision.)	
	Zebulon B. Vance HS	Julius L. Chambers HS	Charlotte	NC	US	Jun 23, 2020	Oct 13, 2020	In June 2020, the Charlotte-Mecklenburg School Board started the process to rename Zebulon B. Vance HS, named after Confederate military officer Zebulon Baird Vance. In October, the board unanimously voted to rename the school in honor of civil rights icon Julius L. Chambers, whose legal work led to the desegregation of Charlotte-Mecklenburg schools in the 1970s.	
	Marge Schott Stadium Marge Schott Seminar Room	UC Baseball Stadium	Cincinnati	OH	US	Jun 23, 2020	Jun 23, 2020	The University of Cincinnati board of trustees voted unanimously to rename a stadium and a library seminar room named after Marge Schott, who made racist remarks in support of Adolf Hitler. (Note: The Marge Schott Seminar Room is located in Carl Blegen Library, which houses the university's Archive and Rare Books Library.)	
	Deady Hall	University Hall (temporarily)	Eugene	OR	US	Jun 24, 2020		The University of Oregon board of trustees unanimously voted to remove Matthew Deady's name from the hall. (Note: The vote followed University of Oregon President Michael Schill's recommendation to the board to rename the hall because of Deady's racist views.) The hall was temporarily renamed "University Hall". Deady was Oregon's first federal judge, and advocated for racial discrimination against African Americans. Previous attempts to change the name had failed. (Note: One such attempt occurred in 2016, when the university's Black Student Task Force demanded that the building be renamed. On January 25, 2017, President Schill refused the demand.)	
	Pacific Beach Joint-Use Field	Fannie and William Payne Joint-Use Field	San Diego	CA	US	Mar 9, 2021		In 1945, over 1,900 Pacific Beach residents petitioned to remove Pacific Beach Middle School's first black teacher from the staff because they didn't think a black teacher deserved to be there. In 2021, a joint-use field at Pacific Beach Middle School was named after Payne and his wife after a petition was circulated in the wake of the Black Lives Matter movement the previous summer.	
	Serra HS	Canyon Hills HS	San Diego	CA	US	Jun 25, 2020	Mar 9, 2021	In June 2020, two sisters, both students at Serra High School, started a petition to change the school's namesake Father Junipero Serra and the school mascot away from the Conquistadors. The San Diego Unified School District board would go on to unanimously approve the renaming of the school to Canyon Hills in March 2021.	
	Civil War (college rivalry)	None		OR	US	Jun 26, 2020	Jun 26, 2020	The University of Oregon and Oregon State University jointly decided to stop using "Civil War" to refer to athletic competitions between the two universities.	
	Woodrow Wilson School of Public and International Affairs Wilson College	Princeton School of Public and International Affairs First College	Princeton	NJ	US	Jun 26, 2020	Jun 27, 2020	The Princeton University board of trustees voted to change the names because "Wilson's racist thinking and policies make him an inappropriate namesake for a school whose scholars, students, and alumni must be firmly committed to combatting the scourge of racism in all its forms". Wilson opposed admitting African American students to Princeton, and introduced racial segregation into the U.S. federal civil service as U.S. president. He also was an avid supporter of the Ku Klux Klan, as in his book A History of the American People he is generally sympathetic to the group stating how during Reconstruction "the white men of the South were aroused by the mere instinct of self-preservation to rid themselves, by fair means or foul, of the intolerable burden of governments sustained by the votes of ignorant negroes and conducted in the interest of adventurers". Wilson also approved the White House screening of the film The Birth of a Nation, which glorified the Klan and led to its resurgence in the southern United States.	
	Hoey Hall Lovill Hall	Dogwood Hall Elkstone Hall	Boone	NC	US	Jun 26, 2020	TBD	The Appalachian State University board of trustees unanimously voted to support Chancellor Sheri Everts' plan to replace the names of the two residence halls. Clyde R. Hoey was a governor of North Carolina who was a segregationist and white supremacist. Edward Francis Lovill was a Confederate captain who "secured a bill that would ultimately lead to the creation of ... the forerunner of Appalachian State" while serving as a Democratic state senator in 1885, and was "the chair of the school's first board of trustees". He was described as a "Democrat of the purest type" at a time when the party "stood for a return to white supremacy and its associated policies".	
	Hoey Auditorium	University Auditorium	Cullowhee	NC	US	Jun 29, 2020		Western Carolina University's board of trustees unanimously voted to rename the auditorium. As governor, Hoey "...actively opposed civil rights legislation and favored racial segregation". He also opposed statehood for Hawaii because it had "only a small percentage of white people".	
	Kroeber Hall	Names removed	Berkeley	CA	US	Jul 2020	Jan 27, 2021	UC Berkeley denamed a building named for Alfred Kroeber, the "founder of the study of anthropology in the American West." Reasons given were the collection of Native American remains for curation and taking custody of a Native American genocide survivor who "performed as a living exhibit for museum visitors."	
	LeConte Hall	Names removed	Berkeley	CA	US	Jul 2020	Nov 18, 2020	UC Berkeley faculty members John and Joseph LaConte were Confederate military veterans who used scientific language to promote racist ideas.	
	Barrows Hall	Names removed	Berkeley	CA	US	Jul 2020	Nov 18, 2020	UC Berkeley faculty member David Prescott Barrows was an anthropologist and colonizer of the Philippines education system who professed that the white race was superior to all others.	
	Watson School of Biological Sciences	Cold Spring Harbor Laboratory School of Biological Sciences	Cold Spring Harbor	NY	US	Jul 1, 2020	Jul 1, 2020	Cold Spring Harbor Laboratory's board of trustees voted to restore the original name of its graduate school because of James Watson's views on race.	
	Burwell Hall	Queens Hall	Charlotte	NC	US	Jul 2, 2020		The Queens University of Charlotte Board of Trustees unanimously voted to rename the main administration building. Rev. Robert Armistead Burwell was the first head of the Charlotte Female Institute, a precursor of the university. He was also a slaveowner who led a Presbyterian church that excluded slaves.	
	Helms Center	Hawks Athletic Center	Murfreesboro	NC	US	Jul 2, 2020		The Chowan University board of trustees renamed the facility, which had honored U.S. Senator Jesse Helms, because "positions taken by Senator Helms were not in keeping with the current mission of Chowan University". The history department called on the university for the change, stating that "it is now time to acknowledge the institutional racism Senator Helms embodied". The center was renamed for the school's athletic teams, the Hawks.	
	Guy T. Gillespie Hall	Lakeview Hall	Jackson	MS	US	Jul 3, 2020		Belhaven University's board of trustees renamed the residence hall. Gillespie was a segregationist and former president of the university. The renaming was supported by the Gillespie family.	
	Cass Business School	Bayes Business School	London	Eng	UK	Jul 6, 2020	Sep 6, 2021	City, University of London announced that its business school would be renamed to strip the school's association with slave trader Sir John Cass. It was decided to rename the school after Thomas Bayes, a philosopher.	
	Copeia (journal)	Ichthyology & Herpetology	n/a		US	Jul 6, 2020	Mar 19, 2021	The board of the American Society of Ichthyologists and Herpetologists voted to rename the society's flagship journal, starting with its May 2021 issue. Scientist Edward Drinker Cope held racist views.	
	Linnean Games (quiz bowl)	Entomology Games	n/a		US	Jul 6, 2020	Jul 6, 2020	The Entomological Society of America renamed its student quiz bowl. Carl Linnaeus, known as the father of modern taxonomy, had "named four 'varieties' of human and ascribed to them anthropological and cultural stereotypes that are inappropriate and offensive today". (Note: Society members also pointed out that Linnaeus was not an entomologist, and using his name for the games implied that the games were centered around the taxonomy of insects, even though the games actually covered a wide range of entomology.)	
	Stonewall Jackson MS	West Side MS	Charleston	WV	US	Jul 6, 2020	Jul 7, 2020 (Note: Date of denaming. The new name was chosen on July 16.)	The Kanawha County Board of Education unanimously voted to change the name. (Note: Over 6,500 suggestions were submitted, with the top five names being West Side Middle School, Katherine Johnson Middle School, Charleston Middle School, Jack Perry Middle School, and Booker T. Washington Middle School.) Confederate general Stonewall Jackson was from West Virginia. (Note: At the time, the area was in the state of Virginia.)	
	Jenkins Hall	Education Building (temporarily)	Huntington	WV	US	Jul 7, 2020	Jul 7, 2020	Marshall University's governing board unanimously voted to remove the name of Confederate general Albert Gallatin Jenkins from the building, and use "Education Building" as a temporary name until the board voted for a new name. (Note: The board had also considered the issue the previous year, but had elected to keep the name at the time.)	
Valley Hall Mountain Hall	Ashby Hall Jackson Hall Maury Hall	Valley Hall Justice Studies Hall Mountain Hall (all temporarily)	Harrisonburg	VA	US	Jul 7, 2020	Jul 7, 2020	The James Madison University board of visitors voted unanimously to change the names of buildings named for Confederate officers Turner Ashby, Stonewall Jackson, and Matthew Fontaine Maury.	
	Fanning Academy of Science and Technology	Falcon Academy of Science and Technology	Brea	CA	US	Jul 7, 2020	Jul 7, 2020	The Brea Olinda Unified School District board unanimously voted to change the name after the Fanning family submitted a letter to the board requesting that the name be removed. (Note: The letter was received by the board on July 6, 2020. The school was previously called "William E. Fanning Elementary School", but the board had changed the name to "Fanning Academy of Science and Technology" when it tried to "partially defuse the issue".) William E. Fanning may have been a KKK member. (Note: His name is "included in list No. 2 of Orange County KKK members", but there was considerable debate over the validity of the list, as seen in the minutes of the board meetings of January 14, 2019 and January 28, 2019.) The falcon is the school's mascot.	
	Parkwood HS Rebels	Parkwood HS Wolf Pack	Monroe	NC	US	Jul 7, 2020	Nov 5, 2020	The Union County Schools Board of Education voted to change the name and mascot. An image of a Confederate soldier had been removed from the school logo earlier after the NAACP called for its change.	
	Stonewall Jackson HS	Mountain View HS	Quicksburg	VA	US	Jul 9, 2020	Jul 9, 2020; May 10, 2024 (reversed)	The Shenandoah County School Board voted to remove the names of Confederate leaders and change the mascots at two of its schools. The board had previously issued a resolution condemning racism. After three school board members running on a platform against teaching critical race theory in schools were elected, a motion to restore the Stonewall Jackson name lost on a tie vote. The school board voted to restore the name to Stonewall Jackson in 2024.	
	Ashby-Lee ES	Honey Run ES	Quicksburg	VA	US	Jul 9, 2020	Jul 9, 2020; May 10, 2024 (reversed)	The Shenandoah County School Board voted to remove the names Turner and Lee in 2020. The school board voted to restore the names in 2024.	
	Joe Jamail Field Robert Lee Moore Hall	Campbell-Williams Field (Note: Renamed in honor of Earl Campbell and Ricky Williams.) Physics, Math, and Astronomy Building	Austin	TX	US	Jul 13, 2020	Sep 4, 2021 Jul 13, 2020	University of Texas at Austin interim president Jay Hartzell announced that the building and the football field would be renamed. Robert Lee Moore was a segregationist mathematics professor who refused to teach Black students, (Note: Rice University Professor Raymond L. Johnson had "wr[itten] in [Moore's] teacher profile that Moore once told a black student 'he was welcome to take his course, but that he would start with a C and could only go down from there.'") was "hostil[e] toward the black community", and was "obsess[ed] with claims of intellectual differences among the races". Joe Jamail was a rich alumnus who made large donations to the university. (Note: The Spun notes that "[t]here's no apparent controversy surrounding Jamail or his family.) Jamail's family requested the name change "to be more inclusive and promote diversity".	
	Robert E. Lee ES	Delmas Morton ES	Grand Prairie	TX	US	Jul 14, 2020	Jul 14, 2020	Grand Prairie Independent School District voted to rename the school. Delmas Morton served the children of the school district for nearly 45 years, including 17 as principal of Austin Elementary School.	
	Woodrow Wilson School	Harmony Grove Elementary School - A Global Academy	Framingham	MA	US	Jul 14, 2020	May 19, 2021	Renamed due to Wilson's segregationist policies and racist foreign policies. The new name honors a local park with a natural amphitheatre that was used by the Massachusetts Anti-Slavery Society and an 1874 women's suffrage convention.	
Performance at Lee-Davis High School	Lee-Davis HS Stonewall Jackson MS	Mechanicsville HS Bell Creek MS	Mechanicsville	VA	US	Jul 14, 2020	Oct 14, 2020	The Hanover County School Board voted to rename the schools and change their mascots. Lee-Davis was home of the Confederates, and Stonewall Jackson was home of the Rebels. Lee-Davis had been founded in 1959 as an all-white school. A petition to rename Lee-Davis had amassed roughly 25,000 signatures.	
	Jefferson Davis HS Robert E. Lee HS Sidney Lanier HS	Johnson Abernathy Graetz HS Dr. Percy L. Julian HS N/A	Montgomery	AL	US	Jul 14, 2020	Oct 10, 2022 (Johnson Abernathy Graetz HS, Dr. Percy L. Julian HS) N/A (Sidney Lanier HS rename)	The Montgomery County Board of Education voted to rename the schools. (Note: The renamings of Davis and Lee passed 6–1 and the renaming of Lanier passed 5–2.) Sidney Lanier was a Confederate private who became a prestigious poet. (Note: The United Daughters of the Confederacy posthumously made him a symbol of the Lost Cause in the 1920s.) A petition to rename the schools had amassed nearly 30,000 signatures. The planned name change of Lanier High School was canceled when the school board voted to merge Lanier with George Washington Carver High School in 2022; Lanier closed after the 2022–23 academic year. If a waiver to the Alabama Memorial Preservation Act was not granted, the district faced a $25,000 fine. (Note: A private group had already raised more than $42,000.)	
	Oñate HS	Organ Mountain HS	Las Cruces	NM	US	Jul 14, 2020	Jul 8, 2021	The Las Cruces Public Schools board voted to rename the school, despite a community survey reporting overwhelming opposition to the change. One of a number of removals of references to conquistador Juan de Oñate from public spaces in New Mexico.	
	Wilson HS	Ida B. Wells-Barnett HS	Portland	OR	US	Jul 14, 2020	Jan 26, 2021	The Portland Public Schools Board of Education decided to rename the school. (Note: Board hoped to obtain student input in autumn before renaming the school in spring of 2021.) U.S. President Woodrow Wilson "instituted segregation in federal government agencies and was an ally of the Ku Klux Klan". Board members also supported renaming Madison High School before a planned reopening in 2021 after major renovations. In January 2021, the school was renamed in honor of Ida B. Wells.	
	San Antonio College Rangers	San Antonio College Armadillos	San Antonio	TX	US	Jul 14, 2020	Jul 14, 2020	San Antonio College's College Council unanimously recommended to "immediately stop using the name, symbol, logo, and image of the 'Ranger'", which college president Robert Vela approved. (Note: The mascot was first chosen in 1926, shortly after the college was founded as University Junior College during a time when there was "an education statute mandating racially segregated schools".)	
	Thorndike Hall	Building 528	New York	NY	US	Jul 15, 2020	TBD	The board of trustees of Teachers College, Columbia University, voted unanimously to rename the hall. Psychologist Edward Thorndike was "a proponent of eugenics, and held racist, sexist, and antisemitic ideas".	
	Woodrow Wilson HS	Dakota HS	Fargo	ND	US	Jul 16, 2020	Dec 8, 2020	The Fargo Human Relations Commission unanimously voted to recommend that the Fargo School Board rename the school, which it did.	
John Tyler High School	Robert E. Lee HS John Tyler HS	Tyler Legacy HS Tyler HS	Tyler	TX	US	Jul 16, 2020	Jul 16, 2020	The Tyler Independent School District Board of Trustees voted unanimously to change the schools' names. John Tyler was President of the United States from 1841 to 1845, but joined the Confederacy after the start of the Civil War.	
	Peter Burnett ES	Aviation ES	Hawthorne	CA	US	Jul 22, 2020	Jan 25, 2022	Peter Burnett Elementary School was named after California's first governor. However, due to Burnett's racist history, the school was renamed to 138th Street Elementary School. At the January 25, 2022 school board meeting, 138th Street was given a new name: Aviation Elementary School. The renaming took place effective the 2023-2024 school year.	
	Trinkle Hall	James Farmer Hall	Fredericksburg	VA	US	Jul 24, 2020	Nov 19, 2021	Built in 1940, the E. Lee Trinkle Hall at the University of Mary Washington was named after a former Virginia governor that was an outspoken supporter of segregation and eugenics. Following decisions by students, staff, and the UMW Board of Visitors, the building was renamed in memory of James Farmer, a prominent leader of the Civil Rights movement as well as a UMW professor in his later years.	
	Nott Hall Morgan Hall	Honors Building The English Building (temporarily)	Tuscaloosa	AL	US	Aug 5, 2020 Sep 17, 2020	Aug 5, 2020 Sep 17, 2020	The University of Alabama trustees unanimously voted to rename both halls. Morgan Hall, which contains the school's English department, was named after John Tyler Morgan, a former U.S. senator. Morgan maintained ties with the Ku Klux Klan, called the abolition of slavery a mistake, and promoted Jim Crow laws. Nott Hall was named after Josiah C. Nott, a scientist, slaveowner, and advocate for slavery.	
	Barringer Hall Lee Hall	Whitehurst Hall Hoge Hall	Blacksburg	VA	US	Aug 13, 2020	Aug 14, 2020	Virginia Tech changed the name of two residence halls after a vote by the school's Board of Visitors. Paul Brandon Barringer was a former administrator and President of Virginia Tech who was known for his eugenicist and white supremacist views. Barringer Hall was renamed in honor of the first Black student allowed to live on campus, James Leslie Whitehurst Jr. Claudius Lee was a professor at the school who was listed as being the "Father of Terror" in a campus organization named the "K.K.K." in the 1896 edition of the school's yearbook, Bugle. Lee Hall was renamed after Janie and William Hoge, a notable Black couple in the area who had housed students denied housing by discriminatory practices conducted by the school in the 1950s.	
	Sir John Cass's Foundation Primary School	The Aldgate School	London	Eng	UK	c. Sep 2, 2020		The Cass Child and Family Centre, which runs a reception class alongside a nursery and children's centre at the school, also was renamed, as the City of London Child and Family Centre.	
	David Hume Tower	40 George Square	Edinburgh	Sct	UK	Sep 10, 2020	Beginning of 2020–2021 academic year	Hume was involved in the slave trade and wrote in his essay "Of National Characters" (1753) that "negros" are "naturally inferior to the whites". The building is the tallest on the University of Edinburgh campus.	
	Vaughan Secondary School	Hodan Nalayeh Secondary School	Vaughan	ON	CA	Sep 16, 2020	c. Mar 2, 2021	Vaughan Secondary School was a high school named for the city it is in, Vaughan, Ontario. It was revealed that Benjamin Vaughan, after whom the city was named, was a slaveowner. After consultations, the school was controversially renamed after Hodan Nalayeh, a Somali-Canadian journalist.	
	Stonewall Jackson MS	Roberto Clemente MS	Orlando	FL	US	Sep 22, 2020	Sep 22, 2020	The middle school, which was formerly restricted to white students, was renamed after Roberto Clemente, a Major League baseball player and humanitarian.	
	Trinkle Hall Maury Hall Taliaferro Hall Morton Hall Tyler Hall	Unity Hall York River Hall Hulon L. Willis Sr. Hall John E. Boswell Hall Chancellors' Hall	Williamsburg	VA	US	Sep 25, 2020	Sep 25, 2020 Apr 23, 2021	The College of William & Mary announced the renaming of multiple campus buildings previously named for various Confederate officers and/or segregationists. The former two were given placeholder names, while the following two were renamed for two William & Mary alumni; Tyler Hall reverted to its former name, after the chancellors of the college.	
	Clive House	Owen House	Newport, Shropshire	Eng	UK	Oct 13, 2020	Sep 2021	The house in Adams' Grammar School, named after Robert Clive (instrumental in establishing British rule in India in the 18th century), was renamed for early 20th-century poet Wilfred Owen.	
	Sir John A. Macdonald Hall	Law Building	Kingston	ON	CA	Oct 19, 2020		Queen's University announced that it would be changing the name of its law school building, named after the prime minister Sir John A. Macdonald, for his participation in establishing Canada's residential school system and for instituting a head tax on Chinese immigrants.	
	Colston's Girls' School	Montpelier HS	Bristol	Eng	UK	Nov 6, 2020	Sep 1, 2021	A previous attempt to rename the school in 2017 was unsuccessful. The new name was decided in a vote by staff and students. Edward Colston was an English merchant and slave trader. Colston's School, a different school in Bristol, is also reconsidering its name.	
	Pierce Library	EOU Library	La Grande	OR	US	Nov 12, 2020		Eastern Oregon University removed the name from the library due to the racial views of Walter M. Pierce. The library had been named for Pierce and his wife, but he had ties to the Ku Klux Klan.	
	Codrington Library	All Souls College Library	Oxford	Eng	UK	Nov 20, 2020		The library was founded with a bequest from Christopher Codrington, whose wealth derived from slave plantations in the West Indies.	
	Clive House	Raphael House	Sandy Lodge, Hertfordshire	Eng	UK	Jan 9, 2021		The house at Merchant Taylors' School, named after Robert Clive, was renamed after cricketer, rugby player and politician John Raphael, who died in World War I. Both were former pupils of the school.	
	Osler Lane Osler Parking Structure	Biomedical Sciences Way South Parking Structure	San Diego	CA	US	c. Aug 15, 2021		Following a petition made by a medical student from the Pauma Band, who objected to William Osler's gifting of Native American skulls to a mentor in Germany, among other actions, UCSD changed the name of the Parking Structure to South Parking Structure and Osler Lane to Biomedical Sciences Way.	
	Big Haus (residence hall)	Central	Purchase	NY	US	Mar 21, 2022	Jul 26, 2022	One of Purchase College's three first-year dormitories. Renamed due to "Big House" being slang for prison, which "disproportionately targets Black, Indigenous, and People of Color".	
	Dixie State University	Utah Tech University	St. George	UT	US	May 16, 2022	Jul 1, 2022	The name "Dixie", former Rebels mascot, and Confederate symbolism in logos long had been a source of controversy. Protests after Floyd's murder led to students seeking to drop Dixie from the university's name.	
	Patrick Henry HS	Camden HS	Minneapolis	MN	US	Aug 17, 2022	Dec 13, 2023	An advisory committee to Minneapolis Public Schools unanimously approved a name-change process for the school, which was named after the early American Revolutionary figure, Patrick Henry, who also owned slaves. The 2022 name-change decision was a contrast to a pre-George Floyd renaming effort that failed in 2018. The community recommended it be named for the Camden Community it was located in. The city school board approved the change in late 2023 effective for the 2024-25 school year.	

== Geography ==
Image	Old	New	Location			Reported	Executed	Details	Ref.
	Lake Shore Drive	Jean Baptiste Pointe du Sable Lake Shore Drive	Chicago	IL	US	Oct 17, 2019	Jun 25, 2021	The renaming of Lake Shore Drive, although proposed before the murder of George Floyd, gained a renowned push after the Black Lives Matter movement. DuSable was a Haitian-born trader of African descent and is recognized as the founder of Chicago.	
	(section of); 16th Street Northwest	Black Lives Matter Plaza Northwest	Washington	DC	US	Jun 5, 2020	Jun 5, 2020 Mar 11, 2025 (reversed)	On Breonna Taylor's birthday, Mayor Muriel Bowser renamed two blocks of the street in front of the White House, using giant yellow letters on the street. On March 11, 2025, the letters were removed from the street.	
	Lynchview Park	Verdell Burdine Rutherford Park	Portland	OR	US	Jun 9, 2020		Portland Parks & Recreation and Mayor Ted Wheeler announced the change. Rutherford was a prominent local historian and civil rights leader. Centennial School District Superintendent Paul Oakley stated that there was no connection between lynching and the Lynch family, but the name caused "a disruption for some students".	
Sir John Hawkins Square	Sir John Hawkins Square	Jack Leslie Square	Plymouth	Eng	UK	Jun 9, 2020	TBD	The Plymouth City Council announced that the square would be renamed because of John Hawkins's links to the slave trade. It now commemorates the Plymouth Argyle footballer Jack Leslie, the only professional black player in England between 1921 and 1934.	
Wunaamin Miliwundi Ranges	King Leopold Ranges	Wunaamin Miliwundi Ranges	Kimberley	WA	Au	Jun 12, 2020	Jul 1, 2020	The Western Australian government sought to hasten the name change in response to the removal of Leopold II's statue in Antwerp. The new name is a combination of the names given to the ranges by the traditional owners, the Ngarinyin and Bunuba peoples.	
	Livingston Park	Black Lives Matter Park	Albany	NY	US	Jun 16, 2020	Jun 16, 2020	The Albany Common Council unanimously renamed the park in honor of Juneteenth. The Livingston family was a prominent family in New York but owned Antiguan and Jamaican slaves.	
	Hemming Park	James Weldon Johnson Park	Jacksonville	FL	US	Jun 17, 2020	Aug 11, 2020	The City Council voted to rename the park after writer and civil rights activist James Weldon Johnson. The adjacent monorail station was also renamed to match.	
	Stapleton	Central Park	Denver	CO	US	Jun 17, 2020	Aug 1, 2020	The Stapleton Master Community Association voted to rename the Denver neighborhood (Note: Two blocks of the southeast area of the neighbourhood are actually located in Aurora.) named after former mayor and Ku Klux Klan member Benjamin F. Stapleton, for whom Denver's former airport, Stapleton International Airport, was also named. The community narrowed down the new name to four options: Central Park, Concourse, Mosley, and Skyview. The community selected the name "Central Park".	
	Broad Street	Black Lives Matter Boulevard	Salisbury	MD	US	Jun 19, 2020		City Administrator and Acting Mayor Julia Glanz stated that the inspiration came from the renaming of Black Lives Matter Plaza in Washington, D.C., and executing the idea was inexpensive and took about two weeks.	
	Lake Maury	The Mariners' Lake	Newport News	VA	US	Jun 19, 2020		The Mariners' Museum board of trustees voted to rename the lake. Matthew Fontaine Maury was an oceanographer and Confederate officer.	
	Main Street	Black Lives Matter Way	Hempstead	NY	US	Jun 25, 2020		During the renaming ceremony, Mayor Don Ryan stated that "until Black Lives Matter, the dream of the United States Constitution falls short of its mark."	
	Place de l'Europe	Place de la liberté et de la dignité humaine (Note: This can be translated as "Liberty and Human Dignity Square".)	Dakar	Dk	Sn	Jun 28, 2020	TBD	On Jun 27, 2020, the municipal council of Gorée Island unanimously voted to rename the square. The island itself is a symbol of the slave trade, and associations had demanded that the square be renamed as early as 2018.	
	Stonewall Jackson Memorial Cemetery	Oak Grove Cemetery	Lexington	VA	US	Jul 3, 2020	Sep 3, 2020	The Lexington City Council voted unanimously to change the name and requested suggestions from residents. Stonewall Jackson was buried there in 1863, and the cemetery was named after him in 1949. The council unanimously voted to change the name to "Oak Grove Cemetery", subject to a public hearing, which confirmed the change.	
	Columbus Park	Unity Square Park	Trenton	NJ	US	Jul 7, 2020	TBD	The mayor stated that the park would be renamed, stating that "what we know about Christopher Columbus simply makes his image a poor fit for a city that is diverse as Trenton". A statue of Christopher Columbus was also removed from the park.	
	Chapman Pond	Evans Pond	Tallahassee	FL	US	Jul 8, 2020	TBD	The City Commission unanimously voted to change the name. Florida Chief Justice Roy H. Chapman "upheld segregationist policies". Dr. Charles Evans was president of the Tallahassee NAACP.	
	Jeff Davis Peak	Da-ek Dow Go-et Mountain	Humboldt–Toiyabe National Forest	CA	US	Jul 9, 2020		The mountain was previously named after Confederate President Jefferson Davis, who had no known connections with the state of California. The new name is derived from the Washo language and roughly translates to "saddle between points."	
	Columbus Park	Prospect Park	Buffalo	NY	US	Jul 10, 2020	Nov 10, 2020	The mayor and other city officials stated that the park would be renamed "with a name that better honors the contributions and sacrifices of Italian Americans". A statue of Christopher Columbus was also removed from the park.	
	Lee Square	Florida Square	Pensacola	FL	US	Jul 14, 2020		The Pensacola City Council voted unanimously to revert the square's name back to Florida Square. The council also voted to remove a Confederate monument in the square.	
	Robert E. Lee Road	Unison Road	Houston	TX	US	Jul 14, 2020		Harris County Commissioners unanimously voted to rename the road.	
	Jackson Park	Chochenyo Park	Alameda	CA	US	Jul 21, 2020	Jan 21, 2021	Alameda's first park was renamed after previously honoring former U.S. President Andrew Jackson. The City Council directed the Parks and Recreation Commission to propose new names, and a change to Chochenyo Park was made official shortly afterward. Chochenyo is the language spoken by the Lisjan Ohlone people.	
	Margaret Sanger Square	Name removed	New York City	NY	US	Jul 21, 2020	Dec 15, 2021	Planned Parenthood of Greater New York (PPGNY) announced it was "working with the Community Board, City Council and community" to rename the intersection of Bleecker and Mott streets outside its Manhattan Health Clinic. Margaret Sanger was a supporter of eugenics. The City Council had voted to name the intersection after Sanger in 1993, as PPGNY had moved a clinic to that location and advocated for the honorary naming. They voted to remove the street sign in December 2021.	
	Douglas Park	(Anna and Frederick) Douglass Park	Chicago	IL	US	Jul 22, 2020	Nov 18, 2020	The Chicago Park District Board of Commissioners voted unanimously in an emergency meeting to rename the park, located in a 90% Black neighborhood. (Note: Because the board called an emergency meeting, advocates working on the renaming for years were disappointed at being unable to attend, with one organizer stating that she felt snubbed, and a group of student advocates who wanted the park named for both Frederick Douglass and his wife Anna Murray Douglass were unable to present their request at the meeting.) A 45-day public comment was required before the name change could be finalized. Stephen A. Douglas was "one of the country's most notorious slavery advocates". (Note: Douglas supported expanded slavery in a debate against Abraham Lincoln, and his wife owned at least 100 slaves.) Frederick Douglass was an abolitionist born into slavery who ran a station on the Underground Railroad with his wife Anna Murray Douglass.	
	Cassland Road Gardens	Kit Crowley Gardens	Hackney, London	Eng	UK	Jul 23, 2020	TBD	Local residents decided on a new name for the park, which had been named after slave trader John Cass. It now honors Kathleen 'Kit' Crowley, who lived in the neighborhood for six decades and was described by those who nominated her as 'a role model for children of the Windrush generation growing up in the area'. She experienced poverty and racism in childhood, and growing up where survival often relied on the goodness of neighbours shaped her resilience and sense of community spirit.	
	Roy G. Williams Park	Elliott Avenue Park	Sanford	FL	US	Aug 10, 2020	Aug 10, 2020	The City Commission of Sanford restored the original name to the park. (Note: The commission found no record of the park being formally named by the city after Williams, but acknowledged that it was being referred to with his name, and adopted a resolution rejecting the usage of that name.) Roy G. Williams was a former police chief who once removed Jackie Robinson from a baseball game to enforce segregation laws and was also once jailed for forcing city prisoners to work on his farm in Georgia. The park is located on Elliott Avenue.	
	Confederate Park	Springfield Park	Jacksonville	FL	US	Aug 11, 2020		The City Council voted unanimously to rename the park, which is within the Springfield neighborhood of Jacksonville, Florida.	
People have taken to adding an umlaut to the street name signs to change the offending term, as "Möhren" means "carrots".	Mohrenstraße	Anton-Wilhelm-Amo-Straße	Berlin	Be	De	Aug 20, 2020	Aug 23, 2025	The District Assembly of Berlin's Mitte district decided to rename the street, which uses a term considered to be a racial slur. (Note: Mohrenstraße is thought to derive its name from black or former slaves, who may have lived there in the early 18th century.) Anton Wilhelm Amo is considered to be "Germany's first well-known philosopher and legal scholar of African origin". (See also Mohrenstraße U-Bahn station, below).	
	Leopold II Tunnel	Annie Cordy Tunnel	Brussels	Bru	Be	Sep 8, 2020	May 22, 2022	Residents of Brussels submitted suggestions for a new name for the tunnel, after a woman. Following a vote, it was decided to rename the tunnel after Annie Cordy, a local singer.	
	Black Boy Lane	La Rose Lane	West Green, London	Eng	UK	Oct 1, 2020	Jan 23, 2022	Residents and businesses on the street had been asked to choose a new name from a shortlist of two: Jocelyn Barrow Lane and La Rose Lane, after John La Rose, a poet, writer and political and cultural activist. The new sign was vandalised but restored.	
	Rideau-Goulbourn Ward	Rideau-Jock Ward	Ottawa	ON	CA	Nov 19, 2020	Jan 31, 2022	Despite the misspelling, the ward had been partly named for 19th-century British politician Henry Goulburn. Due to his attachment to slavery, his part of the name was changed in favor of the local Jock River.	
	(Part of) Havelock Road	Guru Nanak Road	Southall, London	Eng	UK	Nov 25, 2020	TBD	The largest Sikh temple in Europe, the Gurdwara Sri Guru Singh Sabha Southall, is on this stretch of road. Virendra Sharma, the MP for Ealing Southall, had been campaigning to rename it since 1992. The road had been named for Henry Havelock, a British general associated with the Indian Rebellion of 1857.	
	Jeb Stuart Trail	Northern Edge Trail	Montgomery County	AL	US	Dec 7, 2020		The trail was renamed to remove the name of the Confederate general J. E. B. (Jeb) Stuart.	
	Henry Clay Park	Zitkala-Ša Park	Arlington	VA	US	Dec 8, 2020	Dec 12, 2020	The Lyon Park Citizens' Association proposed the change to the Parks and Recreation Commission in 2020, and the move received unanimous support from the Historical Affairs and Landmark Review Board and majority support from the Neighborhood Conservation Advisory Committee. Secretary of State Henry Clay held abolitionist views but kept slaves. Zitkala-Ša was a Native American writer, musician, educator and activist who lived in Arlington and is buried at Arlington National Cemetery.	
	McCarran International Airport	Harry Reid International Airport	Las Vegas	NV	US	Feb 16, 2021	Dec 14, 2021	From 2012 on, there were calls to rename McCarran International Airport. It had been named after U.S. Senator Pat McCarran, who had a reputation for being anti-Semitic and racist. After the murder of George Floyd, the Clark County Commission decided to rename the airport after U.S. Senator Harry Reid. Reid apologized in 2010 for racist remarks he made about Barack Obama.	
	Forrest Street	Barack Obama Boulevard	Valdosta	GA	US	Jul 23, 2021	Nov 1, 2021	Local activists called for the street to be renamed due to its association with Nathan Bedford Forrest, a Confederate general and founder of the Ku Klux Klan. Other residents opposed the change, citing city records that indicated the street was named for Elbert Forrest, a local African American business owner. The city council approved the renaming in favor of Barack Obama, the first African-American President of the United States.	
	Dight Avenue	Cheatham Avenue	Minneapolis	MN	US	Dec 25, 2021	Mar 17, 2022	A street in the Longfellow community was renamed for John Cheatham, one of the first Black firefighters in the city. It had been named for Charles Fremont Dight, a former city council member and food safety proponent, but who had also advocated for human eugenics and praised Nazi leader Adolf Hitler.	
	Discovery Park	Kumeyaay Park	Chula Vista	CA	US		Nov. 1, 2022	After decades of advocacy and the removal of a Christopher Columbus statue during the height of the George Floyd protests, the park was named after the Kumeyaay people who are native to the region. “It corrects a romanticized, historical fantasy that these lands were ‘discovered,’” according to the director of Kumeyaay Community College.	
	Lee Highway	Langston Boulevard	Arlington	VA	US	Jul 17, 2021		Arlington County became the first jurisdiction in Northern Virginia to rename their section of Lee Highway in the 2020s.	
	Yonge-Dundas Square	Sankofa Square	Toronto	ON	CA	Jul 24, 2021	Aug 23, 2025	A public square, created in 2002, was named after its cross-streets, one of which, Dundas, became controversial as it was named after a UK Lord who had voted against the abolition of slavery in the British Empire. Toronto City Council voted to rename Dundas Street, Dundas subway station, the square and the Dundas West Station on July 23, 2021. Due to the cost of renaming the street, it was dropped. A committee was struck to develop a name for the square. The square was renamed "Sankofa Square" and officially changed in 2025.	
	Lee Highway and various local streets	Blenheim Boulevard, Fairfax Boulevard, Main Street, and others	Fairfax City	VA	US	Jul 12, 2022	Jan 1, 2023	Fairfax City removed a total of 14 Confederate street names.	
	Lee Highway and Lee-Jackson Memorial Highway	Route 29 and Route 50	Fairfax County	VA	US	Jun 15, 2023	Jul 5, 2023	After considering several alternatives, Fairfax County decided to just use the route number as the new street name.	
	Columbus Park	Piazza Italia Park	San Antonio	TX	US			The new name was approved unanimously by the San Antonio City Council on August 10, 2020. A statue of Columbus was removed from the park on July 1, 2020 after it was vandalized.	

== Government ==
Image	Old	New	Location			Reported	Executed	Details	Ref.
	State of Rhode Island and Providence Plantations	State of Rhode Island	n/a	RI	US	Jun 12, 2020	Nov 3, 2020	An executive order by Gov. Gina Raimondo removed "and Providence Plantations" from official state documents and symbols. Leading legislators of the General Assembly then removed the phrase from internal legislative documents. Rhode Island voters approved the name change in a referendum on November 3, 2020. The same question had previously failed 78% to 22% in 2010. Though Providence Plantations did not utilize slaves, petitioners argued the word has connotations of Southern slave plantations, and that Rhode Island merchants historically played a large role in the transatlantic slave trade.	
	Andrew Jackson Post Office	Susan A. Davis Post Office	Rolando, San Diego	CA	US	Jun 24, 2020	Dec 27, 2022	Having received a petition, city councilor Georgette Gomez wrote a letter to Congress to support legislation changing the building's name. Rep. Sara Jacobs has called for "genuine community involvement in the naming process." On November 18, 2022, Jacobs introduced a bill to rename the post office co-sponsored by all 53 members of the California delegation of the US House. It passed by voice vote on November 29, 2022. President Joe Biden signed the bill into law on December 27.	
	Two Independence Square	Mary W. Jackson NASA Headquarters	Washington	DC	US	Jun 24, 2020	Feb 26, 2021	NASA Administrator Jim Bridenstine announced that its headquarters building will be renamed after Mary W. Jackson, the agency's first female African American engineer.	
	Lewis Cass Building	Elliott-Larsen Building	Lansing	MI	US	Jun 30, 2020		Renamed by Governor Gretchen Whitmer via executive order. Lewis Cass was a Michigan territorial governor who "owned a slave; defended a system to permit the expansion of slavery; and implemented a policy that forcibly removed Native Americans from their tribal lands". State Representatives Daisy Elliott and Melvin L. Larsen were primary sponsors of the bipartisan Elliott-Larsen Civil Rights Act.	
	Mohrenstraße (U-Bahn station)	Anton-Wilhelm-Amo-Straße	Berlin	Be	De	Jul 3, 2020	Aug 27, 2025	The Berliner Verkehrsbetriebe (BVG) (Note: The abbreviation is taken from its original name, "Berliner Verkehrs-Aktiengesellschaft".) initially announced that the station would be renamed "Glinkastraße" after a street nearby, as "Mohr" is considered a racial slur (see Mohrenstraße, above). The proposed name was criticized as its namesake, the composer Mikhail Glinka, was anti-Semitic. (Note: A spokesperson for BVG stated that they "[we]re not responsible for street names" and added that the Wikipedia article on him had not covered his anti-Semitism until recently.) In August 2025, the station was renamed after Anton Wilhelm Amo.	
	Chicago Avenue from East 38th Street	George Perry Floyd Jr. Place	Minneapolis	MN	US	Sep 18, 2020		The City of Minneapolis renamed a two-block section of Chicago Avenue near its intersection of East 38th Street in honor of George Floyd. The area of 38th Street and Chicago Avenue is the location of the George Floyd Square occupation protest since 2020.	
	East Calhoun	East Bde Maka Ska	Minneapolis	MN	US	Jul 23, 2021	Jul 31, 2021	The neighborhood was named East Calhoun, after the formerly named Lake Calhoun (for Vice President John C. Calhoun), prior to August 2021. In the aftermath of the murder of George Floyd and greater awareness of racial justice issues, community members sought to change the name to honor the history of the Dakota people in the area.	
	George Perry Floyd Jr. Place	George Perry Floyd Square	Minneapolis	MN	US	May 12, 2022	May 17, 2022	The Minneapolis City Council on May 12, 2022, voted to approved a resolution by Andrea Jenkins to rename "George Perry Floyd Jr. Place" as "George Perry Floyd Square". The section of Chicago Avenue from East 38th Street had previously been renamed for Floyd in September 2020. Minneapolis mayor Jacob Frey approved the change on May 17, 2022. The area of 38th Street and Chicago Avenue was referred to colloquially as George Floyd Square.	
	Fort Pickett	Fort Barfoot	Blackstone	VA	US	Mar 22, 2023	Mar 24, 2023	In commemoration of Colonel Van T. Barfoot. Renamed back to Pickett in honor of decorated WWII Army soldier Vernon W. Pickett in 2025.	
	Fort Rucker	Fort Novosel	Dale County	AL	US	Mar 22, 2023	Apr 10, 2023	In commemoration of CW4 Michael J. Novosel. Renamed back to Rucker in honor of Captain Edward Rucker in 2025.	
	Fort Lee	Fort Gregg-Adams	Prince George County	VA	US	Mar 22, 2023	Apr 27, 2023	In commemoration of Lt. Gen. Arthur J. Gregg and Lt. Col. Charity Adams Earley. Renamed back to Lee in honor of Fitz Lee in 2025.	
	Fort Hood	Fort Cavazos	Killeen	TX	US	Mar 22, 2023	May 9, 2023	In commemoration of Gen. Richard E. Cavazos. In 2025 it was renamed back to Hood in honor of Col. Robert Hood.	
	Fort Benning	Fort Moore	Columbus	GA	US	Mar 22, 2023	May 11, 2023	In commemoration of Lt. Gen. Hal Moore and his wife Julia Compton Moore. In 2025, the name was reverted to Fort Benning, with the new namesake in Corporal Fred G. Benning.	
	Fort Bragg	Fort Liberty	Fayetteville	NC	US	Mar 22, 2023	Jun 2, 2023	As the only recommendation of a non-person name, this choice has attracted both criticism and praise in nearby Fayetteville. In 2025, the name was reverted to Fort Bragg, with the new namesake in Roland L. Bragg.	
	Fort Polk	Fort Johnson	Vernon Parish	LA	US	Mar 22, 2023	Jun 13, 2023	In commemoration of Sgt. William Henry Johnson. Renamed back to Polk in honor of James H. Polk in 2025.	
	Fort A. P. Hill	Fort Walker	Bowling Green	VA	US	Mar 22, 2023	Aug 25, 2023	In commemoration of Dr. Mary Edwards Walker. Renamed back to A. P. Hill in honor of three men: Lieutenant Colonel Edward Hill, First Sergeant Robert A. Pinn, and Private Bruce Anderson in 2025.	
	Fort Gordon	Fort Eisenhower	Augusta	GA	US	Mar 22, 2023	Oct 27, 2023	In commemoration of President Dwight D. Eisenhower. Renamed back to Gordon in honor of Gary Gordon in 2025.	
	Camp Beauregard	Louisiana National Guard Training Center Pineville	Pineville	LA	US	Oct 18, 2023		Previously named for P. G. T. Beauregard. Reversed by order of Gov. Jeff Landry in 2025.	

== Industry ==
Image	Old	New	Location			Reported	Executed	Details	Ref.
Buchanan Wharf	Buchanan Wharf	Barclays Glasgow Campus	Glasgow	Sct	UK	Jun 9, 2020		Barclays Bank removed the name of the slave-owning Tobacco Lord Andrew Buchanan from its new property development after receiving a petition.	
Colston Tower	Colston Tower	Beacon Tower	Bristol	Eng	UK	Jun 11, 2020	Nov 26, 2020	The former name was removed from the building's exterior four days after the statue of Edward Colston nearby was pulled down. The new name was voted for by the 20 businesses based in the tower; it mirrors the renaming of the nearby concert hall, Colston Hall, as the Bristol Beacon.	
	Apple Buchanan Street	Apple Glasgow	Glasgow	Sct	UK	Jun 12, 2020		Apple renamed its Glaswegian store because of Andrew Buchanan's connection to the slave trade as a tobacco plantation owner.	
	Jefferson Area Builders	Charlottesville Area Builders	Albemarle County	VA	US	Jun 12, 2020		The company stated that Jefferson's history of slavery and the changed political climate led to the name change.	
Calhoun Shopping Center	Calhoun Square (shopping mall)	Seven Points	Minneapolis	MN	US	Jun 19, 2020	Oct 21, 2020	Took its name from the former name of the nearby lake Bde Maka Ska, which was renamed in 2018 because of John C. Calhoun's support for slavery and Indian removal.	
	Darlie/黑人牙膏 (toothpaste)	Darlie/好來(Haolai)	n/a	n/a	Cn	Jun 19, 2020	Dec 14, 2021	Colgate-Palmolive stated, "We are currently working ... to review and further evolve all aspects of the brand, including the brand name." Darlie's marketing and packaging features the phrase, 黑人牙膏, which translates into "Black people toothpaste" in reference to its former English name, Darkie. On December 14, 2021, Hawley & Hazel announced the Chinese name of the brand will rename as "好來" ("Haolai") from March 2022.	
	Fair & Lovely (cosmetics for women) Glow & Handsome (cosmetics for men)	Glow & Lovely (cosmetics for women) Smart & Handsome (cosmetics for men)	n/a		In	Jun 25, 2020	Jul 2, 2020 (Glow & Lovely) Jan 14, 2025 (Smart & Handsome)	Unilever announced that it would rename its skin-lightening cream and remove references to lightening and whitening. The new names "Glow & Lovely" and "Glow & Handsome" were announced, with the latter for the men's version of the brand. Emami threatened legal action, as it had renamed its own brand "Fair and Handsome" to "Glow and Handsome" the previous week. On April 11, 2024, the Calcutta High Court ordered Unilever to removed the "Glow & Handsome" products from shelves after Emami winning the suit.	
Splash Mountain as it appeared at Disneyland	Splash Mountain (log flume ride)	Tiana's Bayou Adventure	Bay Lake Anaheim	FL CA	US	Jun 25, 2020	Jun 28, 2024 (Bay Lake) Nov 15, 2024 (Anaheim)	The Walt Disney Company announced that the Splash Mountain rides at Disneyland in California and Magic Kingdom in Florida would be renamed, with depictions from the controversial 1946 film Song of the South replaced with those from 2009's The Princess and the Frog, which introduced the first black Disney Princess. While the rebranding was planned for over a year, the public unveiling of the project was moved up earlier than when it was originally going to be announced. The announcement of Tiana's Bayou Adventure came on July 1, 2022, with the Florida attraction opening two years later; the date for the California opening was announced in August 2024 at the D23 convention.	
	Gen. Jubal A. Early (ferry)	Historic White's Ferry (Note: It is unclear if the ferry was actually renamed or simply denamed, since this phrase also appears to have been often used to refer to the ferry service even before the name change.)	Dickerson	MD	US	Jul 4, 2020 (Note: Change technically executed on unknown date prior to date of first known report.)	Jul 4, 2020	The owner also removed a Confederate monument on the ferry grounds. Jubal Early was "a Confederate general and white supremacist who spent his life promoting the 'Lost Cause' mythology". Elijah V. White, a Confederate colonel, had purchased the ferry after the Civil War. He named the ferry service "White's Ferry" after his family, and named the ferry itself after General Early.	
	Squaw Valley Ski Resort	Palisades Tahoe	Lake Tahoe	CA	US	Jul 14, 2020	Sep 13, 2021	In 2020, management of the resort, known for being location to the 1960 Winter Olympics, announced that removing the slur in its name would be a "lengthy and expensive process" but that it is actively taking an inventory to find out how much it would cost pending a final decision in the future. The resort announced the change was done with guidance of the Washoe Tribe.	
	Charleston Tea Plantation	Charleston Tea Garden	Wadmalaw Island	SC	US	Sep 10, 2020		While there had never been any major outcries or backlash regarding the garden's original name, the Bigelows said they have always been sensitive to the fact that the word "plantation" carries significant pain for many in the country and throughout the world.	
	Red Man (tobacco)	America's Best Chew	Owensboro	KY	US	Jan 20, 2022	Jan 26, 2022	Swedish Match announced that "Red Man" would be changed to "America's Best Chew" as its former name had since been viewed as a derogatory term for a person of color as it showed the head of a Native American wearing a headdress, which also removes the image as well.	

=== Food and drink ===
Image	Old	New	Location			Reported	Executed	Details	Ref.
	Arabian Joe's Baker Josef's Josephsbrau Pilgrim Joe's Thai Joe's Trader Giotto's Trader Jacques' Trader Joe San Trader José's Trader Ming's various others	Trader Joe's	n/a		US	Jul 8, 2019 (Note: Trader Joe's statement issued during the George Floyd protests was first reported on July 17, 2020.)	—	In 2019, Trader Joe's stated that labels which were using such variations of the "Trader Joe's" name were being eliminated, and "these designations do not appear on any new products we have introduced in the past two years". Many of the labels remained during the George Floyd protests, prompting a petition to rename the items, and another statement from Trader Joe's mentioning again that they were being eliminated, and being noncommittal about when the change would be completed. On Jul 24, 2020, Trader Joe's reversed its stance, stating that they "disagree that any of these labels are racist", and that they would only decide on renaming a product "based on what customers purchase [and] the feedback we receive from our customers and [employees]", and not based on a petition. (Note: In 2019, a spokesperson for Trader Joe's had stated, "[A]s we make our way through label updates on older products, we will change any preexisting variations to Trader Joe's", in response to an inquiry from a Nylon reporter. In 2020, the same spokesperson had stated, "[W]e have been in the process of updating older labels and replacing any variations with the name Trader Joe's, and we will continue [to] do so until we complete this important work", in response to a petition.)	
	Sambo's (restaurant)	Chad's	Santa Barbara	CA	US	Jun 5, 2020	Jul 14, 2020	Named for its founders Sam Battistone and Newell Bohnett in 1957. Formerly marketed using imagery from The Story of Little Black Sambo, which has negative connotations. Chad Stevens was the owner when the restaurant was renamed.	
	Bully Hayes Restaurant	TBD	Akaroa	CAN	NZ	Jun 9, 2020	TBD	The restaurant's owners announced that they would be renaming it because of William "Bully" Hayes's involvement in blackbirding in the Pacific during the late 19th century.	
Aunt Jemima flour	Aunt Jemima (breakfast food)	Pearl Milling Company	n/a		US	Jun 17, 2020	Feb 9, 2021	The breakfast foods company announced it was changing its name and imaging, noting that it is "based on a racial stereotype."	
	Uncle Ben's (parboiled rice)	Ben's Original	n/a		US	Jun 17, 2020	Sep 22, 2020	Parent company Mars, Inc. stated that "now is the right time to evolve the Uncle Ben's brand, including its visual brand identity." Effective September 22, Uncle Ben's has been renamed to Ben's Original.	
	Beso de Negra (confectionery)	Beso de Amor	n/a		Co	Jun 19, 2020	Jul 23, 2021	Nestlé announced that it would rename the chocolate-coated marshmallow treat and remove the image used on its packaging. Beso de negra means "kiss from a black woman". The packaging used an image of a black woman with bare shoulders and a colorful dress.	
Eskimo Pie	Eskimo Pie (ice cream bar)	Edy's Pie	n/a		US	Jun 19, 2020	Oct 6, 2020	Eskimo Pies were the brand name of a vanilla ice cream product dipped in chocolate. "Eskimo" has been criticized as a racist name for Arctic indigenous peoples such as the Inuit and Yupik.	
	Redskins Chicos (confectionery)	Red Ripperz Cheekies	n/a		Au, NZ & SA	Jun 23, 2020	Nov 16, 2020	Being renamed by Nestlé. "Redskins" and "Chicos" have been interpreted as derogatory terms for Native Americans and Latin Americans, respectively. Just over 1% of Australia's population is Latin American Australians or Mexican Australians.	
	Dixie Brewing Company (Note: Change would also propagate to all Dixie-branded products.)	Faubourg Brewing Company	New Orleans	LA	US	Jun 26, 2020	Mar 22, 2021	Owner Gayle Benson announced the plan to change the name and requested community input. Dixie is a nickname for the Southern United States, especially the states that formed the Confederacy.	
	Colston Arms (pub)	The Open Arms	Bristol	Eng	UK	Aug 30, 2020	Dec 24, 2021	The pub was named after the coat of arms of slave trader Edward Colston. A new name (Ye olde Pubby Mcdrunkface) was deliberately chosen to start a discussion on August 30, 2020. On December 24, 2021, the pub's name was officially changed to "The Open Arms".	
	Eskimo (ice lolly)	O'Payo	n/a		Dk	Jul 14, 2020		Hansens Flødeis announced the name change, made "in case it offended Inuit and other Arctic people". The term "Eskimo" has "a pejorative meaning for many Greenlanders". O'Payo is the name of the Nicaraguan cocoa beans from which the chocolate covering the ice cream is made.	
	Crazy Horse Beer and Burgers	Lucky Horse Beer and Burgers	Des Moines	IA	US	Jul 15, 2020	Jul 16, 2020	Music-themed restaurant was named after Crazyhorse Guitars, formerly operating from that location, and Neil Young's backing band Crazy Horse, but was renamed to avoid comparison to Lakota leader Crazy Horse and any appearance of disrespect.	
	Coon (cheese)	Cheer	n/a		Au	Jul 24, 2020	Jan 13, 2021	While its owners have said in the past that Coon cheese was named after US cheese maker Edward William Coon, this assertion has been challenged, with no link found between the two. "Coon" is a derogatory term for black people, in Australia mainly referring to Indigenous Australians and African Australians.	
	Zigeunersauce (condiment)	Paprikasauce Ungarische Art	n/a		De	Aug 16, 2020		Knorr, a Unilever brand, announced it would rename Zigeunersauce to Paprikasauce Ungarische Art. The term Zigeuner translates to "gypsy" and is generally considered offensive. The replacement name translates to "Hungarian-style paprika sauce". Other manufacturers announced similar plans.	
	Mahatma Rice	Name kept, image removed	n/a		US	Aug 29, 2020	—	Ebro Foods featured an Indian man wearing a turban and kurta as the packaging mascot. It was since removed from the packaging for imaging a South Asian stereotype.	
	Geechie Boy Mill	Marsh Hen Mill		SC	US	Sep 29, 2020			
	Conguitos	TBA			Es		TBD		
	Negro	Nero	n/a		Tr	Dec 1, 2021		Eti released a statement, saying that the change was made because the word was "used as an expression of discrimination in some countries. The previous name meant "black" in Spanish, while the new one means the same in Italian.	

=== Healthcare ===
Image	Old	New	Location			Reported	Executed	Details	Ref.
	Dixie Regional Medical Center	Intermountain St. George Regional Hospital	St. George	UT	US	Jul 16, 2020	Jan 1, 2021	Dixie Regional Medical Center Governing Board announced the name change, effective January 1, 2021.	
	Margaret Sanger Health Center	Manhattan Health Center	New York City	NY	US	Jul 21, 2020		Planned Parenthood of Greater New York (PPGNY) announced it was removing the name of Margaret Sanger from its Manhattan clinic because of her support for eugenics. Karen Seltzer, PPGNY board chair, cited Sanger's "racist legacy" as a reason for the removal. Defenders, including historian Linda Gordon, claimed that Sanger was "no more racist than many progressives of her time".	
	Carilion Stonewall Jackson Hospital	Carilion Rockbridge Community Hospital	Lexington	VA	US	Jul 23, 2020	Jul 24, 2020	Carilion Clinic announced it had obtained full ownership of the hospital, and would rename the hospital "follow[ing] the naming convention it uses for all other facilities ... to reflect the region it serves" once the "necessary regulations are met".	

=== Lodging ===
Image	Old	New	Location			Reported	Executed	Details	Ref.
	Captain Cook Hotel	Dive	Dunedin	Ota	NZ	Jun 15, 2020	Jun 18, 2020	The owners announced that they would be changing the name in response both to Captain James Cook's controversial legacy among Māori and to the Black Lives Matter protests sparked by George Floyd's murder.	
	Stonewall Jackson Hotel	Hotel 24 South	Staunton	VA	US	Jun 16, 2020	Sep 1, 2020	Hotel owner renamed the hotel (named after Confederate general Stonewall Jackson).	
	Stonewall Jackson Inn	Friendly City Inn	Harrisonburg	VA	US	Jun 26, 2020	Sep 30, 2020	Owners had purchased the bed and breakfast in 2019 intending to change the name and carried out the name change in September 2020.	
Building where the Sheridan Livery Inn is currently located, taken sometime between 1919 and 1970, when it was the location of the Rockbridge Laundry and Cleaners	Robert E. Lee Hotel Sheridan Livery Inn	The Gin Tonic	Lexington	VA	US	Jul 29, 2020 (Note: This is the first known report of how the two new names were chosen. The Sheridan Livery Inn announced their name change on social media on Jun 7, 2020, while the Robert E. Lee Hotel's name change was reported by The New York Times on Jul 26, 2020.)	TBD	Both buildings are owned by the same family, who chose the names so that they could be referred to as "The Gin and Tonic".	

=== Music ===
Image	Old	New	Location			Reported	Executed	Details	Ref.
	Colston Hall	Bristol Beacon	Bristol	Eng	UK	Jun 9, 2020	Sep 23, 2020	Bristol Music Trust announced that the venue, located near the statue that was famously toppled on June 8, would be renamed; it described this as "a fresh start for the organisation and its place in the city". There had been plans to rename the venue since 2017.	
	Lady Antebellum (band)	Lady A	Nashville	TN	US	Jun 11, 2020		U.S. country music band changed its name because of its association with slavery. (Note: "Antebellum" refers to culture in the South before the Civil War, including slavery.) African American singer Anita White, who had been using the name professionally for over 20 years, was unhappy with the change, stating, "It's an opportunity for them to pretend they're not racist or pretend this means something to them. If it did, they would've done some research." On July 8, the band filed a lawsuit against the singer.	
	One Little Indian Records	One Little Independent Records	London	Eng	UK	Jun 11, 2020		With the name change that the company announced they would donate money towards organizations which promote and assist Native American communities in North America. In a written statement, founder David Birkett explained. "The last few weeks have been a monumental learning curve ... Following the receipt of an eye-opening letter from a Crass fan that detailed precisely why the logo and label name are offensive, as well as the violent history of the terminology, I felt equally appalled and grateful to them for making me understand what must be changed."	
	Dixie Chicks (band)	The Chicks	Dallas	TX	US	Jun 25, 2020	Jun 25, 2020	U.S. country music band changed their name to "The Chicks". The word "Dixie" is a nickname for the Southern United States, especially those states that seceded to form the Confederate States of America; it is part of the culture of the American South. The name change followed criticism that the word had negative connotations of American slavery.	
	Slaves (band)	Rain City Drive	Sacramento	CA	US	Jun 25, 2020	Oct 15, 2021	Band members announced that their upcoming album To Better Days would be the last they would release under their current name. In a statement, they said "As obstinate supporters of the BLM Movement, we cannot continue to tie our music and our positive message to a word associated with such negative weight and hurt." On October 15, 2021, the band announced that they had changed their name to Rain City and signed to independent record label Thriller Records. However, the band later opted to be known as Rain City Drive.	
	The Black Madonna (disc jockey)	The Blessed Madonna	Louisville	KY	US	Jul 20, 2020		The American DJ announced the change to her stage name after a petition that said "a white woman calling herself 'black' is highly problematic". The original name was chosen as "a reflection of [her] family's lifelong and profound Catholic devotion to a specific kind of European icon of the Virgin Mary which is dark in hue".	
	Joey Negro (disc jockey)	Dave Lee	Isle of Wight	Eng	UK	Jul 21, 2020		The English DJ announced the change a day after fellow disc jockey 'The Black Madonna', Lee admitted he had "not felt comfortable with the name Joey Negro for a while, especially as I've got older".	
	Spirit Animal (band)	Record Heat	Brooklyn	NY	US	Aug 2020			
	Mulatto (rapper)	Latto	Atlanta	GA	US	Jan 28, 2021	May 18, 2021	Rapper announced stage name change because of the controversy of the "Mulatto" term being deemed as colorist.	
	Eskimo Callboy (band)	Electric Callboy	Castrop-Rauxel	NRW	De	Dec 22, 2021	Mar 9, 2022	The German metalcore band announced that they were taking time to "think about [their] name" and that they had deleted several old songs due to offensive and discriminatory lyrics via a post on their Instagram profile. On March 9, 2022, they announced that they would be called Electric Callboy from now on.	

=== Sports ===
Image	Old	New	Location			Reported	Executed	Details	Ref.
Washington Redskins	Washington Redskins	Washington Football Team (temporarily) Washington Commanders	Ashburn	VA	US	Jul 13, 2020	Jul 23, 2020 Feb 2, 2022	Main article: Washington Redskins name controversy On July 1, 2020, a group of investors worth $620 billion had written letters to Nike, FedEx and PepsiCo asking them to stop their support of the NFL until the Washington Redskins changed their name. On July 23, 2020, the Washington Football Team was adopted as the club's temporary name. The team played under that until a full rebrand as the "Commanders" was announced on February 2, 2022. The team also renamed the lower level of Northwest Stadium to honor Bobby Mitchell, one of three African Americans who joined the team in 1962 when the team first integrated and was later inducted into the Pro Football Hall of Fame. Founding owner George Preston Marshall was against integration, and his team was the last NFL team to integrate.	
	Edmonton Eskimos	Edmonton Football Team (temporarily) Edmonton Elks	Edmonton	AB	CA	Jul 16, 2020	Jul 21, 2020 Jun 1, 2021	On Jul 21, 2020, the Edmonton Football Team announced that their board of directors decided to discontinue the use of the old name, as Eskimo is considered a derogatory name for indigenous Alaskans and Canadians. (Note: The team also announced that they would use the names "Edmonton Football Team" and "EE Football Team" until a more appropriate new name is found.) Belairdirect, a longtime sponsor, announced earlier that month that it would cut ties with the team if the name was not changed. On June 1, 2021, it was formally announced that the new team name would be the Edmonton Elks.	
	Kenesaw Mountain Landis Award	MVP Award			US	Oct 2, 2020		The Baseball Writers' Association of America announced that the most valuable player (MVP) awards presented annually in Major League Baseball would no longer carry the name of the first commissioner of MLB. Landis, who served from 1920 to 1944, resisted efforts to integrate both Major League and Minor League Baseball. A number of past MVPs, including Barry Larkin, Mike Schmidt, and Terry Pendleton, objected to continued use of Landis' name. The BBWAA announced its decision after 89% of its members voted for the change.	
Cleveland Indians logo	Cleveland Indians	Cleveland Guardians	Cleveland	OH	US	Dec 14, 2020	Nov 19, 2021	Main article: Cleveland Indians name and logo controversy The team announced that they would be reviewing their name to "embrace [their] responsibility to advance social justice and equality." On December 14, 2020, they announced they would be retiring the Indians branding. On July 23, 2021, they announced the new name to be the Cleveland Guardians; the name change was officially completed on November 19, 2021.	
	J. G. Taylor Spink Award	BBWAA Career Excellence Award			US	Feb 5, 2021		For the second time since Floyd's murder, the BBWAA changed the name of an award due to revelations of racist conduct involving an honoree. This time, it affected the award presented for lifetime achievement in writing about baseball. Spink, who published the Sporting News from 1914 to 1962, used "racist language, ugly stereotypes, and derogatory portrayals" of Negro League players and other African-Americans. The name change received 97% support among the association's members.	

== Terminology ==
Image	Old	New	Group	Reported	Executed	Details	Ref.
	slaves (script)	dm-deps	OpenZFS (storage platform)	Jun 11, 2020		Developer Matt Ahrens, co-creator of ZFS, updated the code to "[r]emove unnecessary references to slavery". The abbreviation "dm" stands for "device-mapper" and "deps" for "dependents".	
	master (code branch)	main	GitHub	Jun 11, 2020	Oct 1, 2020 (all new repositories)	GitHub CEO Nat Friedman announced they were working on the change. Developer Petr Baudiš, self-described "clueless Central European youngster [in 2005] whose command of English was mostly illusory", stated that he chose the term to "express 'this is where you cloned this repo[sitory] from'", as in "master recording". On October 1, 2020, the default branch for all new repositories changed to main. On January 19, 2021, Github added the ability to manually rename existing branches.	
	master	master sommelier	Court of Master Sommeliers, Americas	Jun 22, 2020		Further information: Racism in the wine industry Court of Master Sommeliers, Americas (CMS-A) issued a statement "in solidarity with the Black community" that implied collaboration with Hue Society, without the knowledge of Hue Society Founder Tahiirah Habibi. Habibi then posted a video denying any collaboration and explaining her experiences with CMS-A, including seeing her dream to become "the first black woman to attain [Master Sommelier] status" be shattered after her CMS-A testing experience, which included the requirement that master sommeliers be addressed as "master". (Note: Habibi still passed the test, but refrained from interacting with CMS-A since the experience.)	
	master bedroom master bathroom	primary bedroom primary bathroom	Houston Association of Realtors	Jun 25, 2020		Change was made on its property listing database, but "did not constitute a ban on the use of the word 'master'", which can still be used on marketing materials.	
	master bedroom master bathroom	main bedroom main bathroom	GetBurbed	Jun 30, 2020		GetBurbed is a real estate brokerage firm in Chicago.	
	master slave blacklist whitelist	source or primary replica or secondary blocklist allowlist	MySQL (RDBMS)	Jul 1, 2020		Product manager Kenny Gryp announced that the change was being implemented and would be reflected in future releases.	
	master slave blacklist whitelist	various (Note: Suggestions included "primary", "main", "initiator", "requester", "controller", "host", "leader", "director", "secondary", "replica", "subordinate", "target", "responder", "device", "worker", "proxy", "follower", "performer", "denylist", "blocklist", "allowlist", and "passlist".)	Linux (operating system)	Jul 10, 2020		Principal engineer Linus Torvalds added to the coding style documentation a recommendation to "avoid introducing new usage" of such terminology. (Note: Sources do not appear to state any policy change for existing usage.)	
	Eskimo Nebula Siamese Twins Galaxy	NGC 2392 NGC 4567 and NGC 4568	NASA	Aug 5, 2020		NASA announced that it was reviewing the unofficial terminology it has used for celestial objects in order to determine if any are "not only insensitive, but can be actively harmful". For terminology it has deemed inappropriate, official designations determined by the International Astronomical Union would be used. Two nicknames had been determined as inappropriate at the time of NASA's announcement.	
	McCown's longspur	thick-billed longspur	American Ornithological Society	Aug 7, 2020	Aug 7, 2020	The North American Classification Committee of the American Ornithological Society changed the name of the bird to "thick-billed longspur", which is a literal translation of its genus name, Rhynchophanes, following Black Birder's Week and the Bird Names for Birds campaign. (Note: The organization had previously refused to change the name, despite controversy.) John P. McCown was a general for the Confederate army, took part in the forced relocation of Native American tribes in the 1840s, and fought in the Seminole Wars. (Note: George Newbold Lawrence, the bird's descriptor, had named the species after his friend McCown before McCown fought for the Confederacy. The species can be found in the US, Canada, and Mexico.)	
	chosen freeholder	county commissioner	State of New Jersey (US state)	Aug 21, 2020	Jan 1, 2021	Governor Phil Murphy signed legislation to change the name of the governing bodies at the county level in the state. Lt. Governor Sheila Oliver, an African-American woman who was once a freeholder herself, said that the term "refers to a time when only white male landowners could hold public office".	
	master page	parent page	Adobe InDesign	Oct 26, 2021		Users can create templates that affect all pages of a document. In support of its value inclusion, Adobe now refers to these as "parent pages".	

== Museums ==
Image	Old	New	Location			Reported	Executed	Details	Ref.
	USCGC Taney (museum ship)	WHEC-37 (hull number)	Baltimore	MD	US	Jul 1, 2020		Living Classrooms Foundation, the ship's steward, has removed the previous name from the United States Coast Guard Cutter, and it is now referred to by its hull identification number, WHEC-37. (Note: The ship is "the last surviving warship which was present (and fought) at the Japanese attack on Pearl Harbor". It is a National Historic Landmark located in Baltimore's Inner Harbor.) Roger B. Taney was a Chief Justice of the United States who authored the majority opinion in Dred Scott v. Sandford, declaring that all African Americans were not, and could not become, American citizens, regardless of whether they were enslaved or not.	
	Plimoth Plantation	Plimoth Patuxet	Plymouth	MA	US	Jul 6, 2020		Plimoth Plantation announced a change of name for its 400th anniversary, and is using "Plimoth Patuxet" on its interim logo.	
	T. T. Wentworth Jr. Florida State Museum	Pensacola Museum of History at the University of West Florida	Pensacola	FL	US	Jul 13, 2020	Mar 18, 2021	University of West Florida Historic Trust planned to change the name after learning that Wentworth was "the leader of the Ku Klux Klan in Escambia County". Wentworth had become an Exalted Cyclops in 1925, and the collection of memorabilia he donated to the state in 1983 eventually became the museum that was named after him in 1988. On March 18, 2021, the UWF Historic Trust board voted to change the name of the museum in a 5–4 decision with a new name "Pensacola Museum of History at the University of West Florida".	
	San Diego Museum of Man	Museum of Us	San Diego	CA	US	Aug 2, 2020		On June 24, 2020, the board of trustees approved the name change. The new name was chosen to "better reflect [ the museum's] work towards equity, inclusion, and decolonization".	

== Decision pending ==
Image	Old	New	Location			Details	Ref.
	various	TBD	Lagos	La	Ng	The Lagos State House of Assembly unanimously passed a motion to call on Lagos State Governor Babajide Sanwo-Olu "to direct the Commissioner for Tourism, Arts and Culture to liaise with the Attorney-General and Commissioner for Justice to look at the Listed Sites (Prevention) Law, 2015" with the intention of removing references of colonialism and the slave trade. Floyd's murder and the removal of the statue of Edward Colston in Bristol were explicitly referenced.	
Luton Christian Fellowship. Hibbert Street is on the left	Hibbert Street	TBD	Luton	Eng	UK	Luton Borough Council decided to change the name of a street named after Robert Hibbert, a wealthy slave owner who "set up 12 cottages in Castle Street as a charity for poor widows" that were later replaced by almshouses on the street that bears his name. Consultation with the street's residents, required by local law, has been planned to start in the coming weeks.	
Tillman Hall	Tillman Hall	Old Main	Clemson	SC	US	Clemson University Board of Trustees decided to rename one of their buildings. "Pitchfork" Ben Tillman was a "governor and white supremacist" who "used virulent racism to dominate South Carolina politics". The Heritage Act requires two-thirds approval from South Carolina General Assembly to rename the building.	
	J. Marion Sims (residence hall)	TBD	Columbia	SC	US	President of University of South Carolina endorsed a resolution to rename J. Marion Sims residence hall. Sims "performed hundreds of medical experimentations on enslaved African American women". Board of Trustees approved unanimously. The Heritage Act requires two-thirds approval from South Carolina General Assembly to rename the building.	
	Robert E. Lee Road	Buffalo Soldier Road	El Paso	TX	US	City Council voted unanimously for the change. Must be reviewed by Development Coordinating Committee and approved by City Plan Commission before returning to City Council for another approval. Buffalo Soldiers were "the first Black professional soldiers to serve during peacetime".	
	John C. Calhoun Drive	TBD	Orangeburg	SC	US	Orangeburg City Council voted unanimously to rename the road. The Heritage Act requires two-thirds approval from South Carolina General Assembly to rename the road.	
	Jordan Hall Jordan River Jordan Avenue Jordan Parking Garage David Starr Jordan Prize possibly others	TBD	Bloomington	IN	US	The president of Indiana University formed a committee to review sites and awards named for David Starr Jordan, a former university president and prominent supporter of eugenics. The committee was also tasked with reviewing "all buildings on the nine [Indiana University] campuses and remov[ing] names of anyone whose statements and writings are judged unworthy of the recognition".	
	Clarence Cook Little Hall	TBD	Orono	ME	US	The president of the University of Maine announced on June 29 that he would request that the University of Maine System Board of Trustees remove the name of C. C. Little, the founder of the American Eugenics Society, from a lecture hall.	

== Proposals with official backing ==
Image	Old	New	Location			Details	Ref.
	Dundas Street	TBD	Toronto	ON	Ca	On Jun 10, 2020, Toronto mayor John Tory stated that a working group would be formed "to examine the issue of renaming streets" in response to a petition about the street named after Henry Dundas, 1st Viscount Melville. The proposal also received support from Ontario NDP leader Andrea Horwath. Dundas allegedly prolonged Britain's involvement in slavery by 15 years as he had "made himself the champion of 'gradual' abolition of the slave trade". The city's final report, published in Jun 18, 2021, supported renaming the street. The city's process also sparked reviews of the use of the Dundas name in other areas of the province, including Mississauga, London and Hamilton. On Jul 6, 2021, the City of Toronto's executive committee unanimously supported the renaming of Dundas Street.	
	various	TBD	London	Eng	UK	London mayor Sadiq Khan announced that street names in London with links to slavery are being reviewed.	
	Colville Street	TBD	n/a		Ug	A petition calling on the government to remove the names of several British colonial figures was presented to parliament by lawyer Apollo Makubuya, former Principal Judge James Ogoola, and Member of Parliament Medard Segona. Makubuya explained "our petition has been given a new momentum" because of the George Floyd protests. Speaker Rebecca Kadaga announced plans to convene a task force for the renaming and Kampala lord mayor Erias Lukwago described the motivation as "removing the names of dictators and people who committed crimes against humanity from our streets".	
	King's African Rifles Drive	TBD	n/a		Ug		
	Speke Road	TBD	n/a		Ug		
	Jefferson Davis Parkway	Norman C. Francis Parkway	New Orleans	LA	US	Both petitions were created by the Vice Chairman of New Orleans' Regional Transit Authority.	
	Robert E. Lee Boulevard	Leah Chase Boulevard	New Orleans	LA	US	Both petitions were created by the Vice Chairman of New Orleans' Regional Transit Authority.	
	Muskego Post Office	Colonel Hans Christian Heg Post Office	Muskego	WI	US	In response to vandalism of the statue of Hans Christian Heg, which was targeted during the George Floyd protest even though Heg was an abolitionist and the publisher of an anti-slavery newspaper, Rep. US Representative Bryan Steil introduced a bill to rename a post office in Muskego the "Colonel Hans Christian Heg Post Office".	
	Confederation Bridge	Epekwitk Crossing	Borden-Carleton / Cape Jourimain	PEI / NB	Ca	In April 2022, the legislature of Prince Edward Island unanimously voted in favor of renaming the Confederation Bridge—opened and named as such in 1997—to Epekwitk Crossing, "as way to uphold rights of Indigenous people". The structure connects the Canadian island province of Prince Edward Island to the mainland of contiguous North America. The "Confederation" in the original name refers to the 1867 Confederation of Canada, while "Epekwitk" is the indigenous Mi'kmaq name for Prince Edward Island. The name change must be approved by the Canadian federal government.	

== See also ==
- List of monuments and memorials removed during the George Floyd protests
- List of U.S. Army installations named for Confederate soldiers
- Naming Commission
