= Columbus Park =

Columbus Park may refer to:

- Christopher Columbus Waterfront Park in Boston, Massachusetts
- Columbus Park (Brooklyn) at the southern end of Cadman Plaza
- Columbus Park (Buffalo), New York
- Columbus Park (Chicago), Illinois, listed on the National Register of Historic Places
- Columbus Park (Hoboken, New Jersey)
- Columbus Park (Jamaica)
- Columbus Park (Manhattan), New York
