= Oregon–Oregon State rivalry =

American college rivalry between the University of Oregon and Oregon State University

Oregon–Oregon State Rivalry Series
- Oregon Ducks Oregon State Beavers
- Other names: Civil War (1929–2020)
- Sport: Football; Baseball; Basketball; Lacrosse; Soccer
- Location: Oregon
- First meeting: November 3, 1894; 132 years ago (Football)
- Stadiums: Football: Autzen Stadium (Oregon); Reser Stadium (Oregon State); Baseball: PK Park (Oregon); Goss Stadium (Oregon State); Basketball: Matthew Knight Arena (Oregon); Gill Coliseum (Oregon State)

The Oregon–Oregon State rivalry (formerly known as the Civil War) is a college rivalry between the University of Oregon and Oregon State University. The rivalry is one of the oldest in the nation, dating back to 1894 when the two universities' football teams first met. Although the college football game is the most popular rivalry, the two universities have noted rivalry games in every sport that both sponsor. There is also an academic rivalry between the schools on occasion, and competitions for community services such as blood drives take place often.

== Rivalry series ==
The schools started to officially keep track of the overall series at the start of the 1999–2000 school year with the introduction of the Northwest Dodge Dealers Civil War Series. To determine the overall winner, points are awarded to schools depending on the outcomes of Civil War games in various sports. PacificSource will sponsored the series through 2015, known as the PacificSource Civil War Series. Following this, Safeway took over as the primary sponsor. With athletes, alumni, and boosters questioning the name, usage of the "Civil War" name was officially discontinued in 2020 amid a wave of name changes sparked by the George Floyd protests, though the name is still colloquially used by fans of both teams. As of 2026, the series is known as The Oregon-Oregon State Rivalry Series, presented by Safeway-Albertsons, PacificSource Health Plans, Your Local Toyota Dealers and First Interstate Bank.

=== Points system ===
The current point system grants:

- 3 points to the winner of the football game (worth 2 points prior to the 2008–09 season)
- 1 point to the winner of each men's basketball game (two games are contested each season for a total of 2 points granted)
- 1 point to the winner of each women's basketball game (two games are contested each season for a total of 2 points granted)
- 2 points to the winner of the best of three series in baseball (previously 1 point to the winner of each wrestling dual meet prior the 2008–09 season, when the Ducks dropped wrestling and added baseball)
- 1 point to the winner of the women's soccer game (.5 points to each school if game ends in a tie)
- 1 point to the winner of each men's golf match (two matches are contested each season for a total of 2 points granted)
- 1 point to the winner of each women's golf match (two matches are contested each season for a total of 2 points granted)
- 2 points to the winner of the best of three series in softball
- 1 point to the winner of each women's volleyball game (two games are contested each season for a total of 2 points granted)

For a total of 17 total points granted. Postseason matchups do not currently count towards point totals.

== All-time records ==
Although determining the overall series winner is a fairly recent practice, all-time records for sports between the universities have been kept since play started.

=== Men's sports ===
==== Baseball ====
Oregon State has won three College World Series Titles in 2006, 2007, and 2018. The University of Oregon cut its baseball program in 1981 along with three other sports (men's gymnastics, women's golf and women's soccer). After 28 years, Oregon would bring its baseball program back in 2009. Oregon State leads the all-times series 198–177 as of the 2026 season with the Ducks winning the final Pac-12 Conference matchup between the two. Oregon had won 6 straight meetings dating back to 2024 until an Oregon State win in 2026.

==== Basketball ====
The men's basketball rivalry is one of the most contested games between any two teams in the nation, with an NCAA record 367 games played as of November 19, 2026. The Beavers also hold the NCAA record for the third most wins against a single team (the Ducks) with the series' 193–174 in favor of the Beavers. The Ducks have won 9 straight in the series dating back to 2022, but that streak was snapped in the most recent meeting between the two at the Moda Center when the Beavers won 82–71.

==== Football ====
First contested in 1894, the football rivalry is the fifth-most played college football rivalry game in the NCAA Division I Football Bowl Subdivision. The Ducks lead the overall series at 70–49–10 as of the 2025 season.

==== Soccer ====
The men's soccer teams have only played 3 times, with the Ducks dropping this as a sport at the conclusion of the 1989 season. The Beavers won all three contests played, leaving the record at 3–0–0 in favor of OSU.

==== Wrestling ====
Oregon State has traditionally dominated in this sport, leading the Ducks 103–24–4 in the all-time series as of the end of the 2005–06 season. Oregon State has won the past 7 meets, dating back to the 2003 season. The Ducks have dropped this sport and it has been absent for several years.

=== Women's sports ===
==== Basketball ====
Both teams have recently made the Final 4 with Oregon State going in 2016 and Oregon going in 2019. Oregon leads the all-time series record between the women's basketball programs as of the 2024–25 season at 67–47. Oregon won the most recent meeting between, 96–73, in Eugene.

==== Women's Soccer ====
Oregon leads the all-time series record in women's soccer at 12–11–6 as of the end of the 2023 season.

==== Softball ====
Oregon holds the all-time series lead in softball at 117–90–1, as of 2026.The Ducks have gone 38-11 vs the Beavers since the end of the 2009 season.

==== Volleyball ====
Oregon leads the all-time series with Oregon State 89–44–1 as of the 2025 season. Oregon has won 13 straight matches in the series dating back to 2019.

== See also ==
- PacificSource Civil War Series
- Oregon–Oregon State football rivalry
