= Chochenyo Park (Alameda, California) =

Municipal park

Coordinates: 37°45′40″N 122°14′38″W

Chochenyo Park, formerly known as Jackson Park and Alameda Park, is a small municipal park in Alameda, California. It is located on Park Avenue, south of Encinal Avenue, one block from the Park Street business district.

In July 2020, the Recreation and Parks Commission voted to rename Jackson Park and remove the signage honoring Andrew Jackson, the park's namesake. Chochenyo Park was chosen and made official in January 2021.

== Name ==
Chochenyo refers to the language spoken by the Ohlone tribe, who were the original inhabitants of Alameda island.

== History ==
In 1867, the Alameda Park Tract was subdivided as a residential area for the rich. The center of Park Avenue included a 100-foot-wide and 1,200-foot-long oval park. In 1894, after a multiyear effort to condemn the properties of absentee owners, the city gained title to land in the park. The park was established in 1895. Originally named as Alameda Park, it was renamed Jackson Park in 1909 for President Andrew Jackson.

=== Rename Jackson Park ===
In 2018, Alameda residents started a petition to rename Jackson Park due to Andrew Jackson's treatment of African and Native American peoples. The City of Alameda Recreation and Park Commission did not act on the request to rename the park.

In September 2020, after the police murder of George Floyd, the Commission and City Council unanimously voted to rename the park.

== Amenities ==
The park is a "passive park." There are no play structures, fields, or courts. It has benches, including the Clark Memorial Bench, and the bandstand; it is a tree-lined park.

=== Clark Memorial Bench ===
The park is the subject of local folklore. At one end of the park is a large concrete bench with a plaque ascribed to it: "In Memory of My Dumb Friends." Although many believe the bench is a reference to the singer Jim Morrison, known to hang out and smoke when he lived in Alameda, the bench was a gift from Isabelle Clark in 1920, in honor of her husband. Residents replaced the bench in the early 2000s.

=== Bandstand ===
The bandstand, designed by architect Joseph A. Leonard, was originally constructed in 1890.

== See also ==
- List of name changes due to the George Floyd protests
