= Statue of Christopher Columbus (Buffalo, New York) =

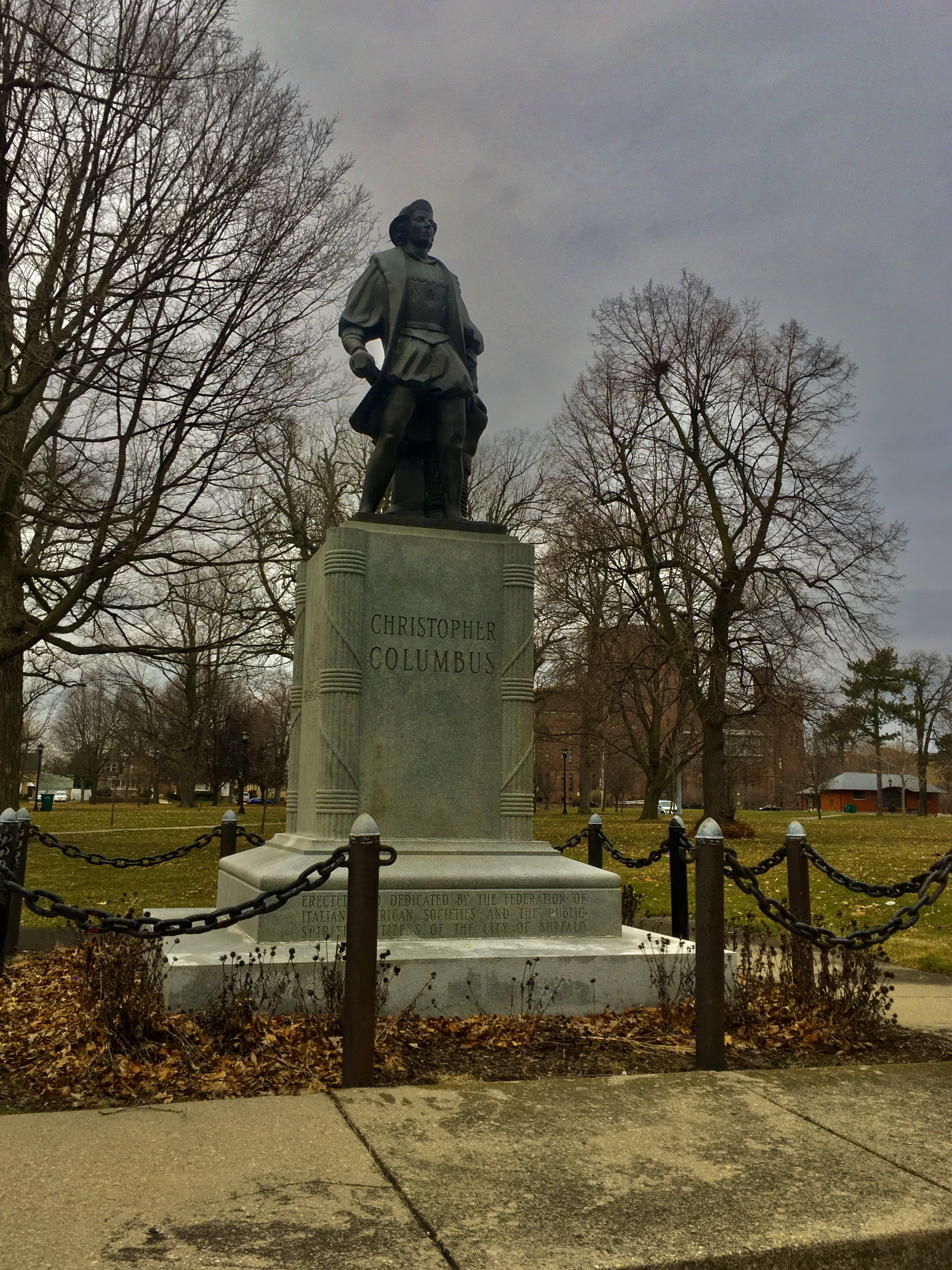
- The memorial in March 2020
- Artist: Giovanni Polizzi
- Subject: Christopher Columbus
- Location: Buffalo, New York, U.S.; 42°54′4.4″N 78°53′34.6″W

A statue of Christopher Columbus by the sculptor Giovanni Polizzi formerly stood in Columbus Park, in Buffalo, New York.

== History ==
The statue was originally installed downtown in 1952 on the tiny triangular block bounded by Franklin, Niagara and West Eagle streets.

In the early 1970s, during the administration of Mayor Stanley Makowski, it was moved 15 blocks north, to make room for urban renewal.

The statue was vandalized multiple times. In 2017, a petition drive began, asking the city to rename the park and remove the statue.

=== Removal ===
On July 10, 2020, the statue of Columbus was removed. The same day, city officials also stated that Columbus Park would be renamed.

It is now located inside the St. Anthony of Padua Church's oratory.

== See also ==
- List of monuments and memorials to Christopher Columbus
- List of monuments and memorials removed during the George Floyd protests
