= Bird Names for Birds =

Campaign to abandon eponyms in common names for birds

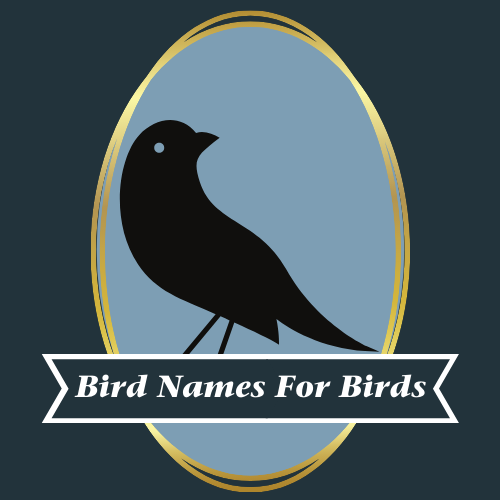
- Abbreviation: BN4B
- Formation: June 22, 2020; 6 years ago
- Founder: Jordan E. Rutter, Gabriel Foley
- Legal status: Active
- Website: birdnamesforbirds.files.wordpress.com

Bird Names for Birds is a campaign to change the common names of American birds named after people, and to redress the recognition in ornithology of figures with racist or colonial pasts. Launched in June 2020 by ornithologists Jordan E. Rutter and Gabriel Foley with a public petition, in the midst of the George Floyd protests and in the aftermath of an incident in Central Park that paved the way to Black Birders Week, the movement emerged after several years of social activism by multiple American ornithologists and birders, many of whom are not affiliated with Bird Names for Birds but remain devoted to the cause. The inaugural petition, dated June 22, 2020, and co-signed by 182 individuals, urged the American Ornithological Society (AOS) to "acknowledge the issue of eponymous and honorific common names, to outline a plan to change harmful common names, and to prioritize the implementation of this plan". In 2023, the AOS formally announced that it would change all English-language bird names that are named directly after people.

== Background and history ==
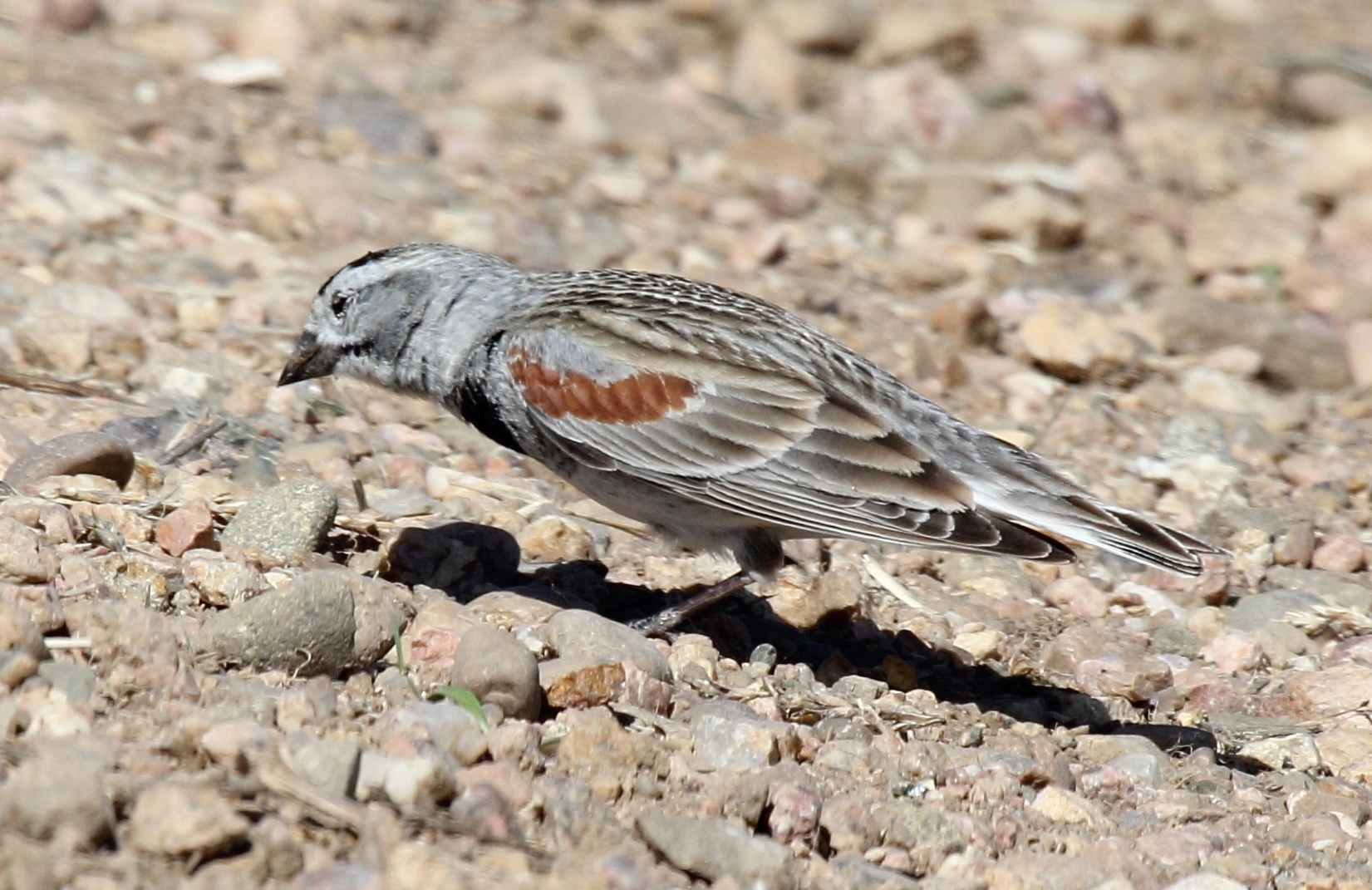
Rhynchophanes mccownii is now named "thick-billed longspur" rather than "McCown's longspur" by the American Ornithological Society

The American Ornithological Society (AOS) maintains a checklist of birds of North America, and claims responsibility for arbitrating the official common names of birds occurring in this area. Proposals for name changes can be submitted to the North American Classification and Nomenclature Committee (NACC) of the AOS. The Bird Names for Birds website notes several notable past proposals, including a rejected proposal to change the name of Maui parrotbill to a newly created name in the Hawaiian language, and a proposal to change the name of oldsquaw to long-tailed duck. This latter proposal was accepted, but the comments on the decision by NACC stated that considerations of "political correctness" alone were not enough to merit a name change.

In 2018, Robert Driver, an American ornithologist and graduate student at East Carolina University, filed a proposal to the NACC, requesting that they change the English common name of McCown's longspur, which was named after Confederate general John Porter McCown. The proposal was published by the NACC on September 18, 2018. The proposal generated considerable attention. On January 19, 2019, ornithologist Matthew Halley wrote in reaction to the McCown renaming debate: "If one common name is changed for ethical reasons, then no honorific should be left standing." Halley went on to list prominent naturalists such as John James Audubon, John Kirk Townsend, Charles Bendire and William Bartram who engaged in behavior such as body snatching and slavery, yet birds named by or after these men were not then controversial. Names now considered "benevolent" might be re-evaluated in the future, Halley said, so he came down on the side of renaming all birds named after humans. On June 23, 2019, an anonymous "guest" author on the popular birding blog "10,000 Birds" advocated for the "[Renaming of] All Birds Named For White People". This blog was published one day before the 137th meeting of the AOS in Anchorage, AK, which occurred on 24–28 June 2019.

In November 2019, the McCown's renaming proposal was overwhelmingly rejected by NACC with a vote count of 1 Yes, 7 No, and 1 Abstain. Most members expressed general concern about the slippery slope nature of the proposal and the need to maintain stability in naming conventions.

In 2020, following weeks of widespread "Black Lives Matter" protests following the murder of George Floyd and calls for racial justice in the United States, Confederate monuments and memorials were toppled by protesters or removed by city officials across the country. The Central Park birdwatching incident on May 25, 2020, led to the founding of Black Birders Week (May 31-June 5, 2020). On June 16, 2020, Halley published another blog detailing "The (literal) skeletons in the closet of American Ornithology", drawing a link between Audubon's and Townsend's body snatching activities, in support of Samuel Morton's ranking of human races by cranial "capacity", to the claims of Alexander Stephens in the Cornerstone Speech, that the white supremacist ideology of the Confederacy was backed by science. In the following months, there was increased media attention devoted to eponymous bird names, particularly those honoring historical figures with links to slavery. The National Audubon Society publicly acknowledged that John James Audubon bought and sold slaves in a blog post by historian Gregory Nobles on July 31, 2020.

== Campaign ==
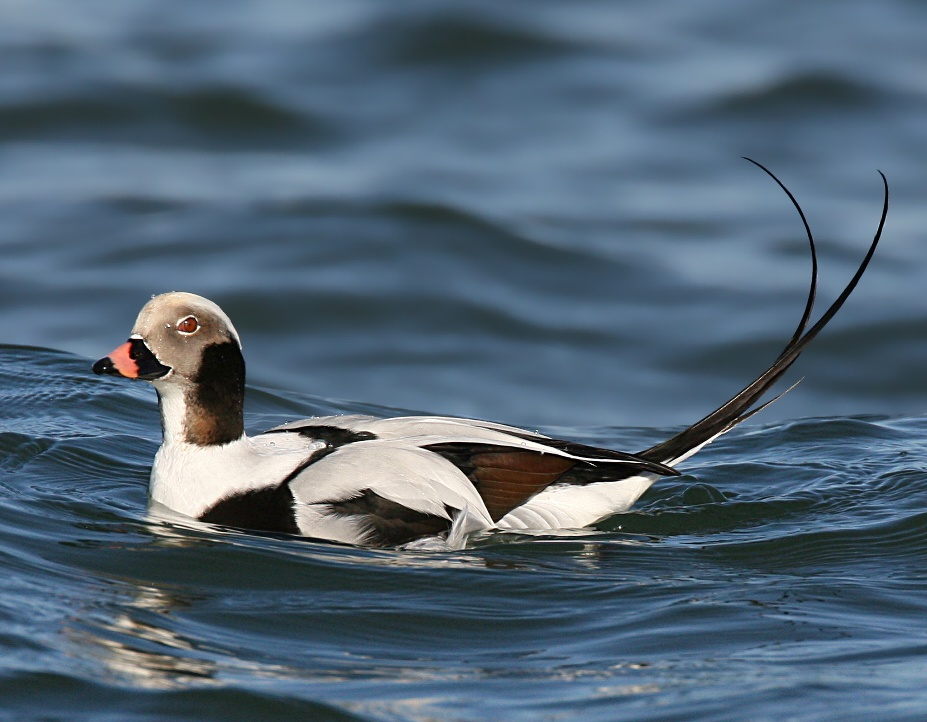
The AOS changed the name of this species from "oldsquaw" to "long-tailed duck" in 2000.

On June 22, 2020, the Bird Names for Birds (BNFB) campaign was launched through a letter to the American Ornithological Society, penned by ornithologists Gabriel Foley and Jordan Rutter, and co-signed by 180 other individuals. The co-founders of the initiative argued that "honorific names cast long, dark shadows over our beloved birds and represent colonialism, racism and inequality. It is long overdue that we acknowledge the problem of such names, and it is long overdue that we should change them." In addition to McCown's longspur, other common bird names with problematic eponymous or honorific references mentioned by the campaign include Bachman's sparrow, Townsend's warbler, Bendire's thrasher, and Hammond's flycatcher. By August 2020, over 2,300 individuals had signed the petition, which received formal support by the American Bird Conservancy.

On July 24, 2020, a second proposal to change the McCown's longspur's name was submitted to NACC by Robert Driver and by NACC chair and Smithsonian researcher Terry Chesser, after consulting with the AOS Diversity and Inclusion Committee.

On November 1, 2023, the AOS announced that it would change all English-language bird names that are named directly after people.

== Response ==
On July 8, 2020, AOS president Kathy Martin announced that the society's leadership was developing "new society-level policies in our nomenclature", and that next steps would be formally announced during the 2020 edition of the society's annual conference. On August 7, 2020, NACC announced the decision to change the common name of Rhynchophanes mccownii from McCown's longspur to thick-billed longspur, as a literal translation of its genus name, Rhynchophanes, following a unanimous vote. The organizers of the Bird Names for Birds campaign welcomed the decision, but emphasized the need to address other 149 common bird names that they consider equally problematic.

The topic has been covered by mainstream media outlets in the United States, and has been mocked by some conservative figures including Senator Ted Cruz (R-TX), who tweeted on June 16, 2021, "Why does WaPo think birds are racist?"

In October 2023, the AOS announced that it was set to rename all bird species associated with individuals, aiming to eliminate names linked to figures with racist pasts. Aiming for more descriptive names based on habitat or physical features, the renaming process would involve public input, addressing concerns about isolation, and demeaning reminders of oppression in bird names. Over 100 avian species across the Americas would undergo this change, with the move eliciting mixed reactions within the birding community.

== Precedents ==
Concerns about the legacy of eponyms in science have been raised in a variety of disciplines. Medical eponyms associated with Nazi human experimentation or Nazi politics have long fallen out of favor or have been selectively deprecated by the medical community. Since 2007, the Israel Medical Association Journal and European Neurology have maintained lists of eponyms honoring Nazis and their collaborators. Some physicians have argued the use of eponyms in the medical nomenclature should be discontinued altogether, while others have argued that such eponyms should be retained as "a means of conveying immortal dishonor."

In 2015 the Swedish Ornithological Society completed its first global list of over 10,000 Swedish bird names and, through the process, decided to remove 10 potentially offensive names it had identified.

The 2020 protests against racism further encouraged academic institutions and scholarly societies to remove potentially offensive references from journal names or academic prizes. In August 2020, NASA announced the decision to deprecate widely used nicknames for a number of astronomical objects, stating that "they are not only insensitive, but can be actively harmful." In a press release, the agency said that Eskimo is "widely viewed as a colonial term with a racist history, imposed on the Indigenous people of Arctic regions." The decision established that planetary nebula NGC 2392, historically known as the "Eskimo Nebula", among other astronomical objects, should be uniquely referred to by their catalog numbers.

== See also ==
- Decoloniality
