= Prospect Park (Buffalo, New York) =

Park located in Buffalo, New York

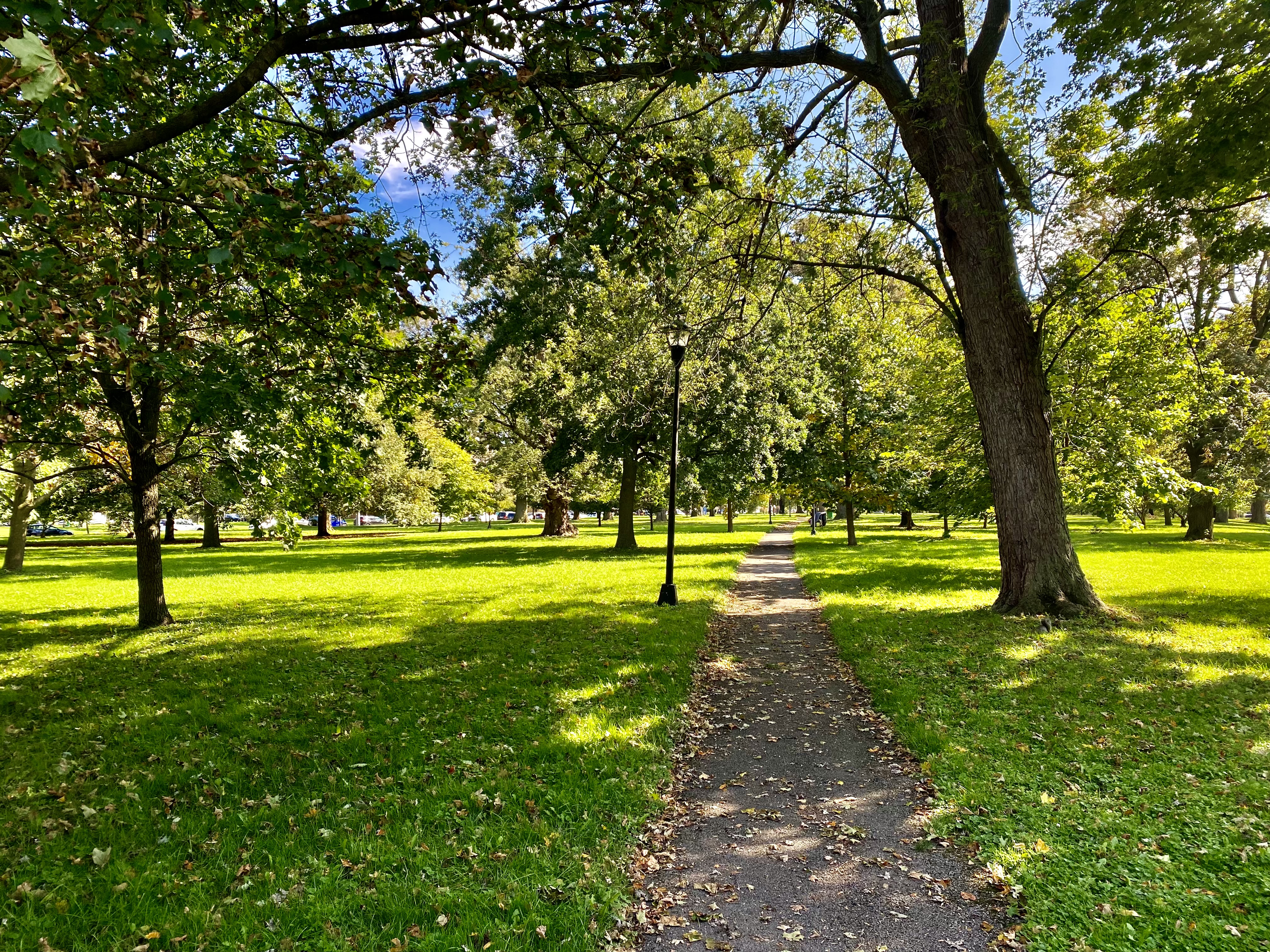
- Prospect Park in 2021

- Location within New York Location within the United States
- Location: 641–649 Niagara St, Buffalo, NY 14201
- Coordinates: 42.9062083°N 78.8984774°W

Prospect Park, formerly Columbus Park, is a park located in Buffalo, New York along Porter Avenue and Niagara Street at 641–649 Niagara St. It is one of the oldest parks in Buffalo, and lies within the Prospect Hill Historic District but is not a contributing property to the district.

The park was originally a nameless public square, deeded to the city in 1836. When it was extended sometime between 1855 and 1866 it started to be called "the Prospect Hill parks". The grounds were impacted by the plans for new Buffalo parks and parkways implemented in the 1870s created by Frederick Law Olmsted. A bronze statue of Christopher Columbus was added in 1952. The statue was moved in 1970 to the western half of the park, which was renamed Columbus Park. The statue was removed on 10 July 2020, reflecting increasing awareness of the problematic aspects of the history of Christopher Columbus. The same day, city officials announced that the Park would be renamed with no mention of Columbus. In October 2020, plans were announced for a new statue to replace the former statue of Columbus in the park, though as of March 2026 the "La Terra Promessa" artwork depicting an Italian immigrant family has not yet been installed. A documentary of the artwork was made in 2007, also called "La Terra Promessa".. In November of 2020, the Buffalo Common Council voted unanimously to rename the park to Prospect Park.
