= Cecil Kern =

American stage and film actress and theater director (c. 1880s–1928)

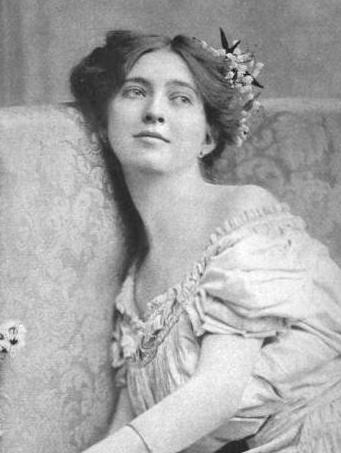
- Kern in a 1909 photo
- Born: Tabitha Cecil Kern c. 1883—1887; Portland, Oregon, or Thayer, Nebraska, U.S. (sources differ)
- Died: June 1, 1928 (aged 41–45); New York City, New York, U.S.
- Resting place: Rose City Cemetery
- Occupations: Actress, theater director
- Years active: 1907–1928

Tabitha Cecil Kern (c. 1880s – June 1, 1928) was an American stage and film actress and theater director. The daughter of a prominent publisher in Portland, Oregon, Kern studied dramatic art in San Francisco before making her Broadway debut in The Revellers (1909), followed by a portrayal of Hélène in the original Broadway production of Madame X (1910). The next year, she appeared as Esther in a Broadway production of Ben-Hur. She also appeared in several films, including Rainbow (1921) for Vitagraph Studios.

Kern died in a Manhattan hotel in June 1928, following weeks of reported isolation. Upon the discovery of her body, the press deemed her death mysterious, though law enforcement suggested it appeared to have been due to natural causes. It was subsequently reported that she had died of a pulmonary hemorrhage.

== Biography ==
=== Early life ===
Tabitha Cecil Kern was born in the 1880s, (Note: Sources regarding Kern's official birthdate vary: The 1910 U.S. Census taken in Manhattan notes Kern was 24 years old at the time, meaning she would have been born in either 1886 or 1887. However, the New York City municipal death records denote a birth year of 1883. Alternately, at the time of her death, news outlets such as Variety stated Kern was 40 years old, suggesting a birth year of 1888–1889.) the daughter of John Jacob Kern, (Note: Some newspaper sources erroneously state that she was the daughter of Albert E. Kern, who was in fact her elder brother, born c. 1875.) a publisher of the Portland, Oregon Deutsche Zeitung, and Henrietta Kern (née Marburg). Both of her parents were German immigrants. 1910 census New York City census records and some news articles indicate she was born in Portland, though the 1885 U.S. Census notes that she was born in Nebraska, where she was residing in Thayer with her family at age 2.

Kern spent the majority of her early life in Portland, where she received her primary education. She became interested in acting at a young age, and relocated to San Francisco to study dramatic art in her teenage years. According to her sister, Meta: "She had a remarkable memory when a child of but three years old and never tired of mimicking and reciting. She must have inherited some of my father's qualities of application and ability to study." Kern's elder brother, Albert E. Kern, later became the president of the First National Bank in Portland, as well as in Madras, Oregon.

=== Career ===
Kern's first major stage role was that of Cynthia, a stenographer, in a production of The Man of the Hour, which began its tour in Atlantic City, New Jersey in the fall of 1907. During a performance at the Moore Theatre in Seattle in January 1908, Kern was physically assaulted by co-star Ruby Bridges, who punched her in the face at the performance's conclusion. Bridges, who claimed Kern had been ridiculing her from offstage, pleaded guilty to assault and was fined $25 for the crime.

She made her Broadway debut 1909's The Revellers. Next, she portrayed Hélène in the original Broadway production of Madame X (1910). The following year, she starred as Esther opposite Oscar Adye in the Broadway production of Ben-Hur, followed by The Governor's Boss in 1914. In 1917, she joined the New Denham Players, appearing in a Denver production of Marrying Money. Kern subsequently appeared in several films, including Rainbow (1921) for Vitagraph Studios. She also appeared in 1921's The House of Mystery.

In 1923, Kern directed the Seattle Theatre Guild's opening season performance of In Love with Love.

== Death ==
Kern was found dead of apparent natural causes in a residential hotel at 24 Fifth Avenue in Manhattan on June 5, 1928. The press deemed her death "mysterious" as she had gone into seclusion during the weeks before, remaining isolated in the hotel room where she lived; a "do not disturb" sign was left hanging from her door for approximately three days before her body was discovered. Per a New York Daily News report, Kern, "tall, blonde and about 40, was found fully dressed and wrapped in a silk comfortable." According to maids at the hotel, Kern had informed them in the preceding days that she had been "distressed."

A subsequent report in Variety noted that her cause of death was pulmonary hemorrhage, which was pronounced by Dr. Hitchley of New York Hospital. The New York City municipal death records list her date of death as June 1, 1928. Her remains were cremated by Fresh Pond Crematory in Queens, and she was interred at Rose City Cemetery in her hometown of Portland, Oregon.

== See also ==
- List of unsolved deaths

== Filmography ==
Year	Title	Role	Notes	Ref.
1919	The Gray Towers Mystery	Miss Sutherland		
1921	Rainbow	Estelle Jackson		
1921	The House of Mystery	Marion Lake		

== Stage credits ==
Year	Title	Role	Notes	Ref.
1908–1909	The Man of the Hour	Cynthia	Touring production	
1909	The Revellers		Belasco Theatre	
1910	Madame X	Hélène	New Amsterdam Theatre, Lyric Theatre	
1911	Ben-Hur	Esther	New Amsterdam Theatre	
1914	The Governor's Boss	Edith Shackleton	Garrick Theatre	
1917	Marrying Money		Denham Theatre, Denver, Colorado	
1925	Something To Brag About	Edith Holmes	Booth Theatre	
1925–1926	Morals	Frau Bolland	Comedy Theatre	
1928	La Gringa	Bertha Beales	Little Theater	
