= Pittstown =

Pittstown can refer to:

- Pittstown, New Jersey
- Pittstown, New York
