= Tomhannock Reservoir =

- Location within New York Location within the United States
- Location: New York
- Coordinates: 42°50′43″N 73°32′45″W
- Type: reservoir
- Basin countries: United States
- Max. length: 5.5 miles (8.9 km)
- Surface area: 1,709 acres (6.92 km^{2})
- Water volume: 12.3×10^{9} US gal (47,000,000 m^{3})
- Surface elevation: 390 ft (119 m)

The water source for the city of Troy, New York, is the Tomhannock Reservoir, a man-made reservoir 6.5 miles (10.5 km) northeast of Troy in the town of Pittstown. The reservoir is 5.5 miles (8.9 km) long, and holds 12.3 billion US gallons (47,000,000 m^{3}) when full. Water quality is good to excellent. Licensed fishing (both warm-weather and ice fishing) is a popular recreational activity. The reservoir supplies water to about 50,000 residents in Troy, as well as to about 85,000 residents in the nearby municipalities of Brunswick, East Greenbush, Halfmoon, Menands, North Greenbush, Poestenkill, Rensselaer, Schaghticoke and Waterford.

== History ==
Construction of the reservoir began in 1900 as a successor to the Oakwood, Brunswick and Lansingburgh Reservoirs. The reservoir went into service in 1906 with a 33-inch riveted steel main. After eight years of repairs to the original 33-inch (84 cm) main, a supplemental 30-inch (76 cm) cast iron main was installed to stabilize the city's water supply. Facilities for chlorination, metering and the addition of lime to the water were added in 1952. In 1960, a study determined that the Tomhannock Reservoir could serve the city of Troy and the region immediately adjacent to the city (East Greenbush, North Greenbush, Brunswick, a portion of Schaghticoke, and West Sand Lake) in southern Rensselaer County. During the early 1960s a treatment plant was constructed, which provided filtration and additional supplementation with alum, carbon, potassium permanganate and fluoride.

On May 10, 2021, construction began to replace the 33-inch main and the 30-inch main from the reservoir to the water treatment plant off of Northern Drive with twin 36-inch water mains that would increase the existing capacity of the mains from around 32 million to 35 million gallons per day to 42 million to 45 million gallons per day. The project is expected to cost $40 million and is estimated to take 18 to 24 months to complete.
