= Cully Park =

Park in Portland, Oregon, U.S.

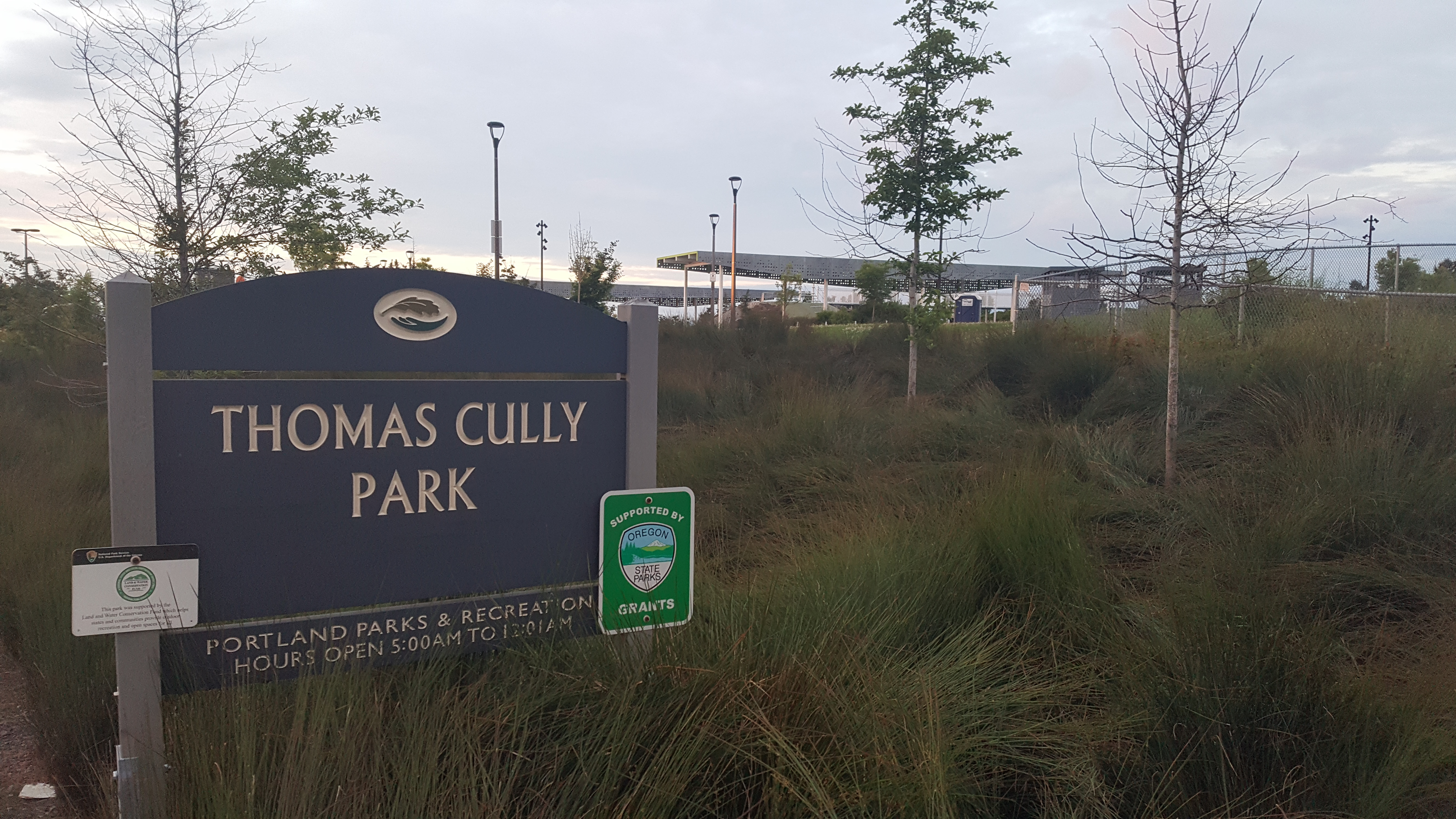
- Park sign, 2022
- Interactive map of Cully Park
- Location: Portland, Oregon, U.S.
- Coordinates: 45°33′56″N 122°35′20″W

Cully Park is a 24.73-acre (10.01 ha) public park operated by Portland Parks & Recreation in northeast Portland, Oregon's Cully neighborhood, in the United States. The park was acquired in 2002. The site previously served as a landfill.

Cully Park offers views of Mount Hood and Mount St. Helens.

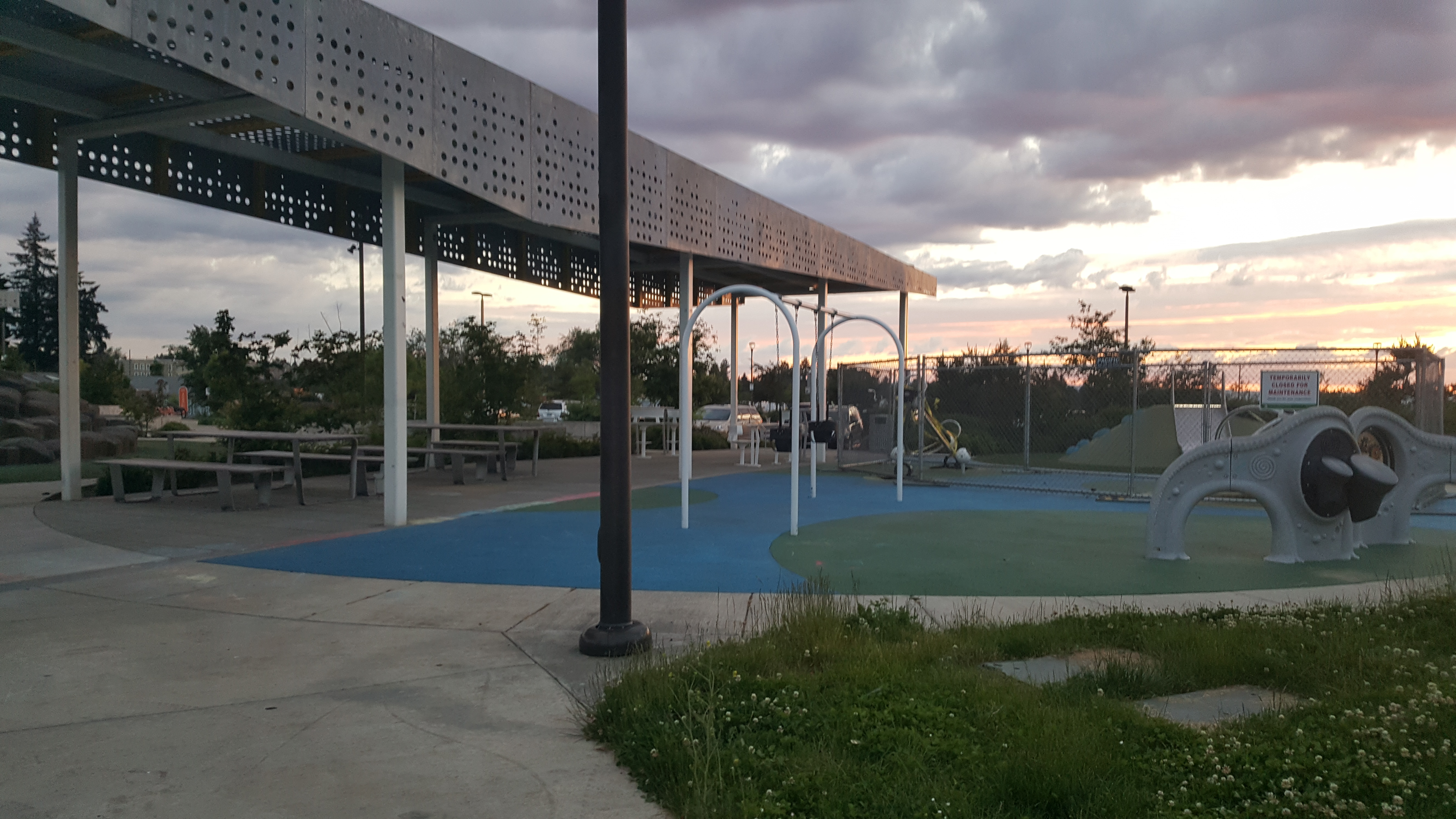
Playground in 2022
