= Alaric B. Chapin =

American Union Army soldier

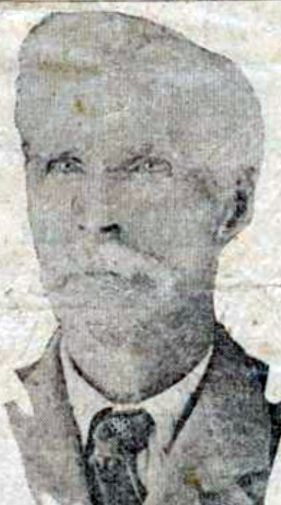
- Born: June 18, 1847; Ogdensburg, New York, U.S.
- Died: November 27, 1924 (aged 77); Portland, Oregon, U.S.
- Burial place: Rose City Cemetery, Portland, Oregon
- Military career
- Allegiance: United States of America; Union
- Branch: United States Army; Union Army
- Service years: 1864–1865
- Rank: Corporal
- Units: (New York (state)) 142nd Regiment New York Volunteer Infantry - Company G 169th New York Volunteer Infantry
- Conflicts: American Civil War • Second Battle of Fort Fisher
- Awards: Medal of Honor

Alaric B. Chapin (June 18, 1848 – November 27, 1924) was a Union Army soldier who received the Medal of Honor for gallantry in the American Civil War.

== Biography ==
Born in Ogdensburg, New York, Chapin enlisted in the Army from Pamelia, New York in February 1864 for a 1-year term. He was serving in the 142nd New York Volunteer Infantry when his regiment attacked at the head of the Union column against Confederate fortifications at the Second Battle of Fort Fisher, North Carolina on January 15, 1865. Although just 17 years old, Chapin voluntarily advanced at the head of his regiment, and despite heavy hostile fire, he gallantly cut down the enemy palisading, allowing his comrades to breach the fortifications and achieve victory. He was transferred to the 169th New York Infantry in June 1865, and mustered out with his regiment the following month.

After the war Chapin farmed, worked as a teamster, and raised a family. He was issued his award on December 28, 1914. Chapin died in Portland, Oregon. He is buried in Rose City Cemetery.

== Medal of Honor citation ==
The President of the United States of America, in the name of Congress, takes pleasure in presenting the Medal of Honor to Private Alaric B. Chapin, United States Army, for extraordinary heroism on 15 January 1865, while serving with Company G, 142d New York Infantry, in action at Fort Fisher, North Carolina. Private Chapin voluntarily advanced with the head of the column and cut down the palisading.

General Orders: Date of Issue: December 28, 1914

Action Date: January 15, 1865

Service: Army

Rank: Private

Company: Company G

Division: 142nd New York Infantry

== See also ==
- List of American Civil War Medal of Honor recipients: A–F
