= Joseph H. Allen =

American infantryman, businessman, politician

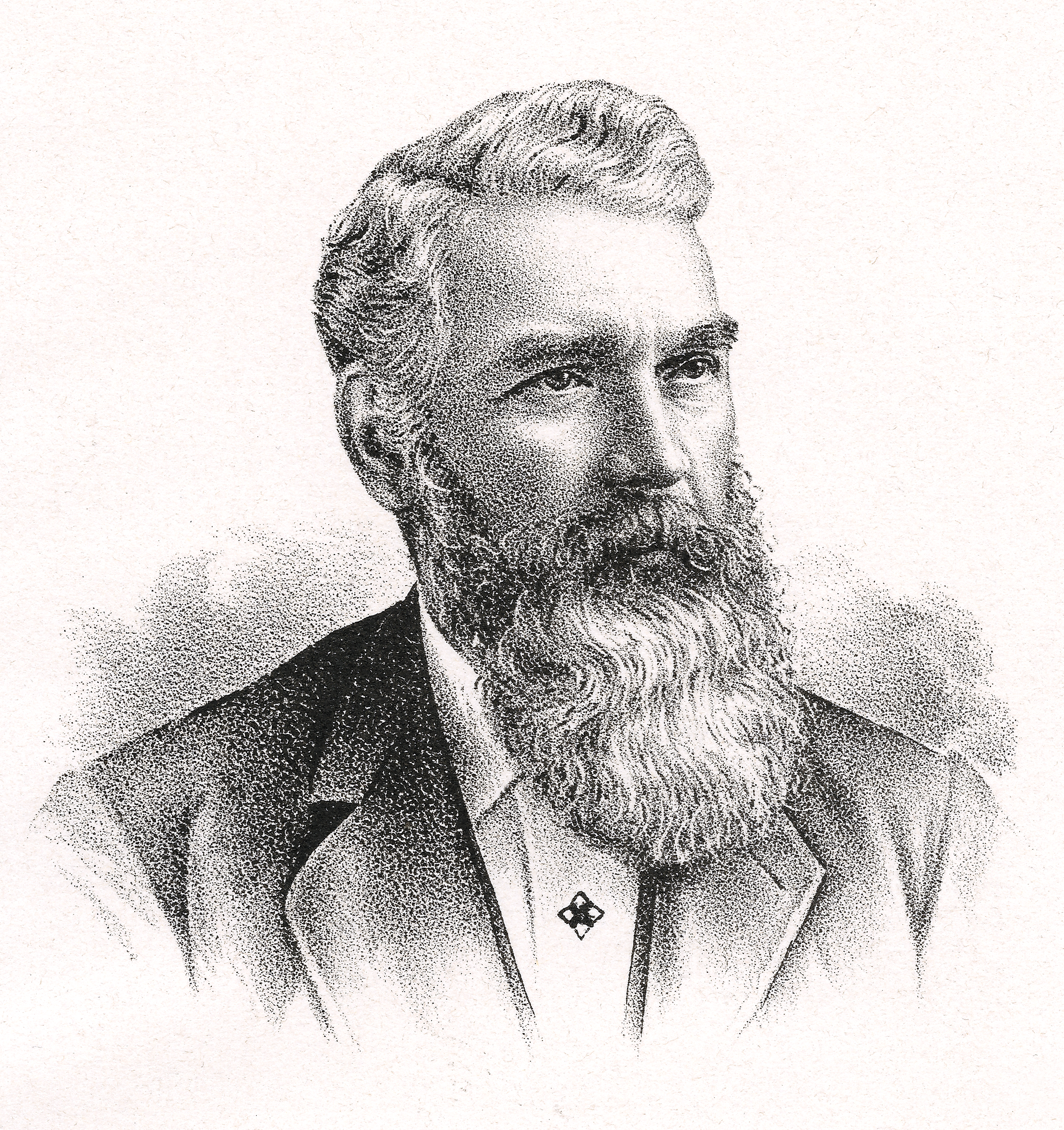

21st Supervisor of Brunswick, New York
- In office 1856–1857
- Preceded by: William Lape
- Succeeded by: Alanson Cook

Personal details
- Born: September 5, 1821 Alburg, Vermont
- Died: April 24, 1884 (aged 62) Eagle Mills, New York
- Party: Whig, Democrat
- Spouse: Sarah H. Payne
- Children: Sarah and Cornelia May
- Occupation: Infantryman, businessman, industrialist, politician

Military service
- Allegiance: United States
- Branch/service: United States Army; Union Army
- Years of service: 1862–1865
- Rank: Lieutenant colonel
- Commands: 169th New York Volunteer Infantry
- Battles/wars: Civil War: Battle of Cold Harbor; First Battle of Fort Fisher

Joseph H. Allen (September 5, 1821 – April 24, 1884) was an industrial businessman, an officer in the Civil War, and a town supervisor^{[a]} of Brunswick, New York. Allen was born in Alburg, Vermont, to parents of British descent and left home at an early age. After several business ventures, he became successful in the auger and hoe business, selling mainly to the American South. He successfully ran for supervisor of the Town of Brunswick in 1856 and justice of the peace in 1861. At the beginning of the Civil War, his sales plummeted, so he closed his business and enlisted in the Union Army. Allen was wounded multiple times during his service and ended his career at the rank of lieutenant colonel. He returned home to reopen his factory, which was instrumental to the industrial success of the hamlet of Eagle Mills in the mid to late 19th century. He died in 1884 at the age of 62.

== Early life ==
Allen was the son of John and Sarah Allen. His father was a native of Connecticut and of English origin, and his mother was originally from Vermont and of Scottish descent. He left home when he was eight years old "to carve out a fortune for himself", as Sylvester put it in his History of Rensselaer County, New York. He began work in an auger factory in Hamden, Connecticut at an early age and continued until he was seventeen years old. At that time, he purchased a clock store, which he traded for horses in Vermont and Canada. He shipped his horses to the West Indies, but the ship was wrecked and his horses were lost, thus placing him badly in debt. However, he soon obtained credit and again shipped a number of horses to the West Indies, this time successfully, enabling him to pay all his debts and even earning him a profit.

== Before the war ==
Allen soon resumed his place in the auger factory in Connecticut, where he remained until September 1, 1843, when he moved to Troy, New York. There, he entered into partnership with O. W. Edson in manufacturing augers. The partnership continued until the following January, when Allen purchased his partner's share and continued in this business until the factory burned down in 1850.

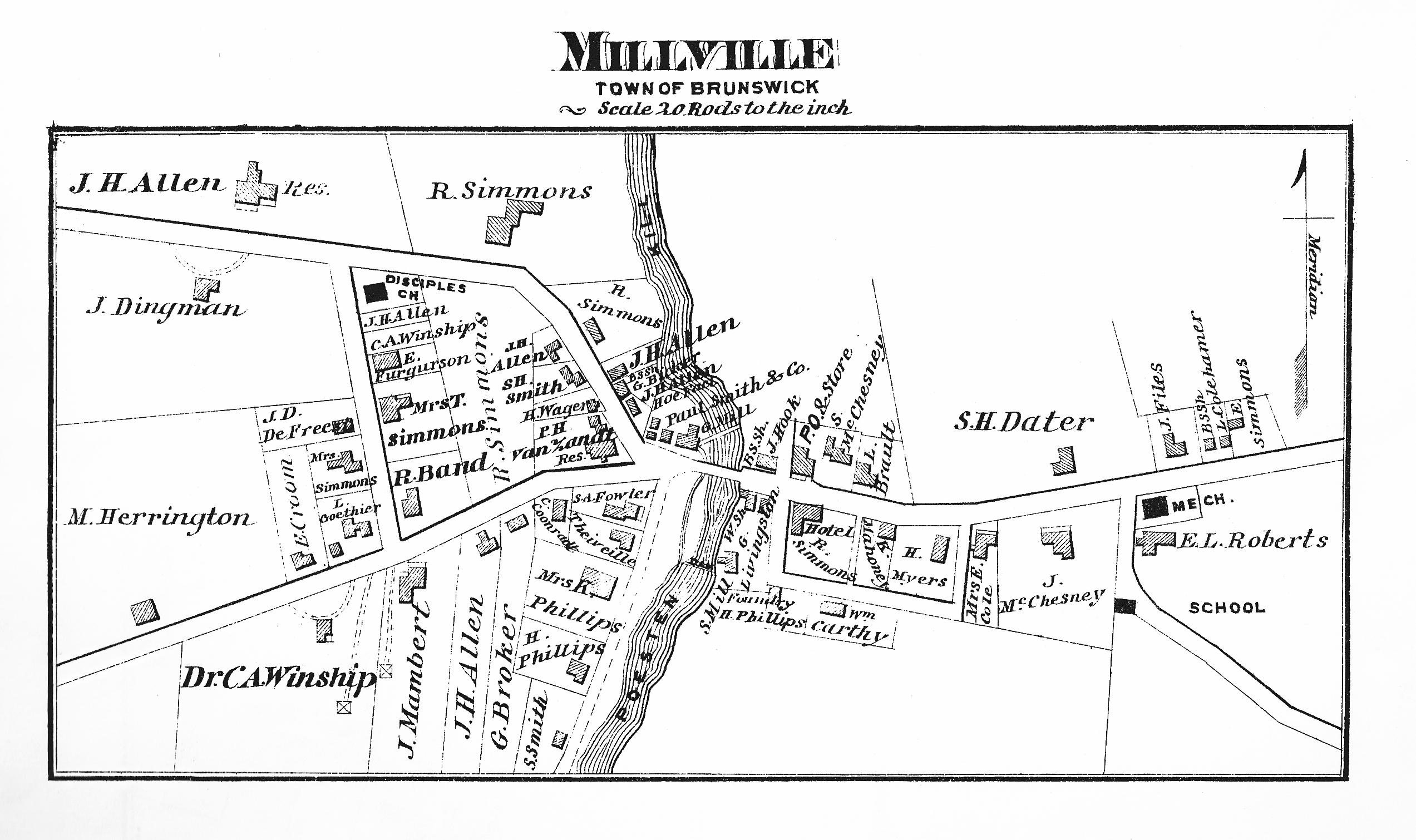
Allen's factory can be seen west of the Poesten Kill and north of the bridge in this 1876 map. His residence is also in the northwest corner.

In January 1851, Allen purchased the Eagle flour mills, an historically important industrial building in the area, which eventually gave the hamlet of Eagle Mills^{[b]} its name. The factory had a long history of failed business attempts. It was built in 1821 by Daniel Sheldon to mill flour using wheat supplied from Troy. After brief success, the business closed and the building sat idle. It was sold to James Bumstead who reopened the building as a feed mill. He too had troubles and sold the building to James McChesney, who kept the building idle for some time before transferring the property to Catlin and Saxton, who began the manufacture of augers and bits. Also unsuccessful, Catlin and Saxton abandoned the business and James McChesney (whose name was still on the deed) sold the property to Groome and Shattuck, who began manufacturing monkey wrenches. This too failed and the property was sold to Paul Smith, a miller from nearby Cropseyville, who sold the property to Allen in 1851 because Smith later decided that he preferred to keep his mills consolidated in Cropseyville.

The factory was located on the rocky banks of the Poesten Kill, a creek that was commonly used for water power in the area. Allen had two new buildings erected and funneled creek water to them through tunnels in the bedrock underneath the buildings. He named his enterprise the Millville Manufacturing Company and converted the mill into an auger and bit factory. At one point, he experimented with producing cable chains and files, as well. But the company soon ran into legal difficulties and was dissolved.

Allen reopened the company in 1859, having added machinery for the manufacture of hoes, and opened a retail store on site. He found a successful market in the South, where demand was high. His company, newly named the Planters' Hoe Company, was a considerable success. However, as the nation came closer to civil war, demand dropped and sales in the South became impossible. The factory was closed in 1861, not only due to poor sales, but because Allen enlisted in the Union Army.

== Public and armed service ==
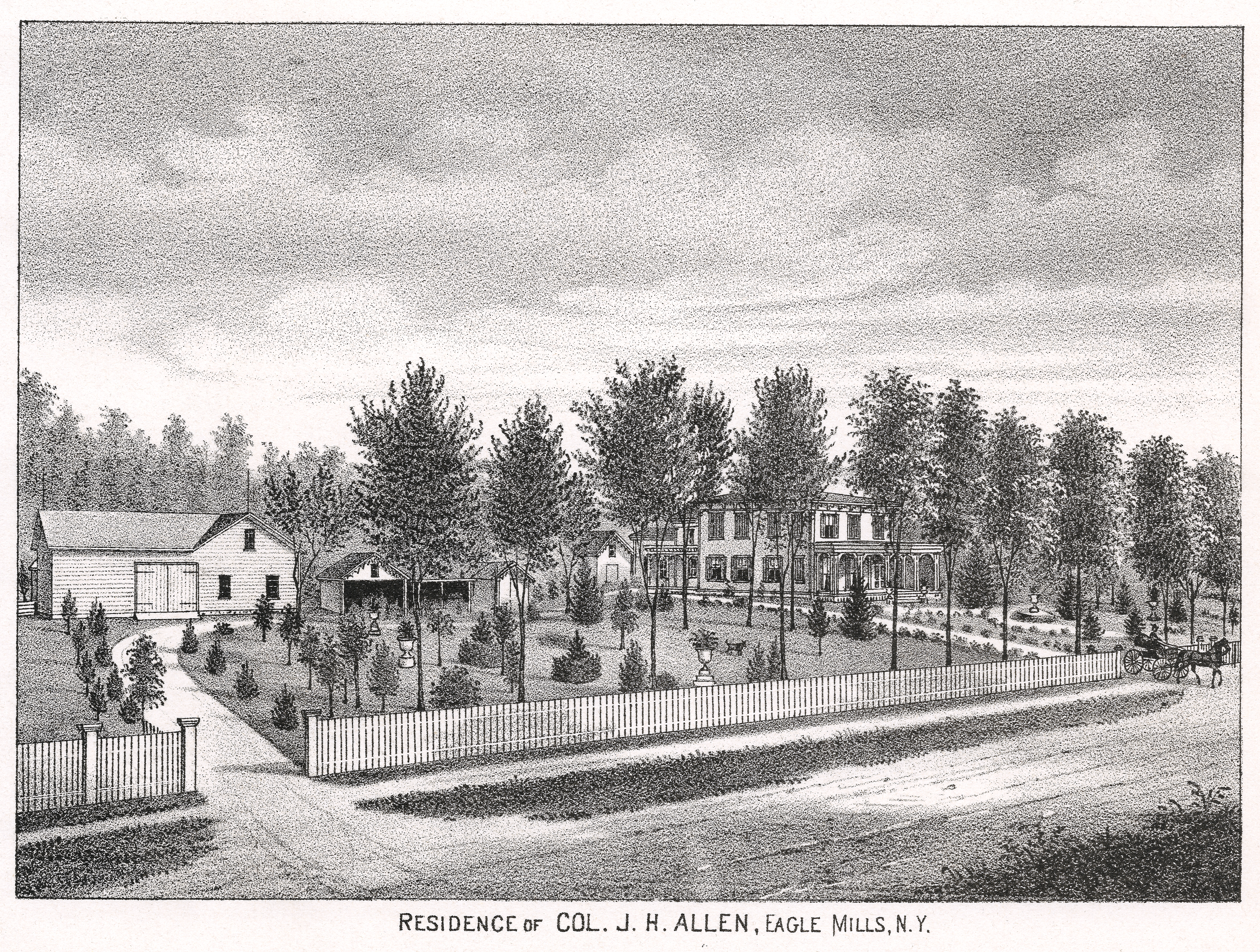
Allen's home in Eagle Mills, which still stands today

Allen's presence was noticeable within Brunswick. In March 1853, he presided over a meeting to incorporate the "Church of the Disciples of Christ at the village of Millville", now known simply as Church of the Disciples of Christ. That summer, a church building was erected at a cost of about $1,200. In 1856 Allen became the supervisor of Brunswick, a position he was reelected to once and held until 1857; he ran as a Whig. He was also elected justice of the peace in 1861, but he did not finish his term because he decided to serve in the Civil War; this time he ran as a Democrat, and remained one for the rest of his life.

In early 1862, the 125th Volunteer Infantry Regiment had been put together in Brunswick and a call by President Lincoln for more troops was answered by Allen that September. He enlisted in Company C of the 169th New York Volunteer Infantry and was chosen captain, having organized the company within six days. Most of the infantrymen came from Brunswick, though some came from surrounding towns. Residents of the town raised the money necessary to cover various "bounties and expenses" incurred by Allen's soldiers while en route to war.

Allen participated in all the battles in which his regiment took part except a few minor ones, due to wounds he received in battle. During the Battle of Cold Harbor, the bones in his wrist were shattered, and he later incurred a flesh wound in the same wrist at the First Battle of Fort Fisher. He was also wounded in the leg near his ankle at Fort Fisher; the musket ball remained there until his death. While recovering from injuries, he was reassigned to New York to recruit new soldiers. He was promoted to the rank of major in June 1864, and, for "meritorious conduct" at Fort Fisher, he was recommended for promotion by President Lincoln and brevetted lieutenant colonel on March 13, 1865.

== Post war and personal life ==
Allen returned to Brunswick after the war and reopened the Planters' Hoe Company in association with George T. Lane. He ended the production of augers, which still made up a small percentage of production even after closing Millville Manufacturing. Allen put himself in charge of manufacturing and sales and he again secured a solid market share in the South. A prosperous trade resumed and was still strong at least until the 1880s. The company eventually expanded and began manufacturing lighter common hoes for the general public, adding to its heavy southern-style line of hoes. The Planters' Hoe Company was still a success as late as the 1890s, but it was extinct by the 1920s.

In addition to holding the offices of justice of the peace and town supervisor, it is also said that Allen was one of the foremost supporters of education in the town. On July 6, 1847, he married Sarah H. Payne, daughter of David H. and Catharine C. Payne, of Hamden, Connecticut. The couple had two children: Sarah and Cornelia May.

Allen died on April 24, 1884, and is buried in Eagle Mills Cemetery on Brunswick Road in Eagle Mills; his wife died in 1907 and is buried next to him. Based on insignia carved on his gravestone (specifically the Square and Compasses), Allen was a Mason.

== Notes ==
- a. In New York, a town supervisor is viewed by many to be equivalent to a mayor, but a supervisor is actually the presiding officer of the town council and is therefore part of the legislative branch; town governments in New York do not have an executive branch.
- b. Eagle Mills is a hamlet (a small, unincorporated settlement) in the Town of Brunswick. It was previously known as Milltown and later Millville; both of these names are now defunct, though "Milltown" was hardly used to begin with.

== Bibliography ==
- Anderson, George Baker (1897). Landmarks of Rensselaer County New York. Syracuse, New York: D. Mason and Company. OCLC 1728151.(Full text via the Internet Archive.)
- Hayner, Rutherford (1925). Troy and Rensselaer County New York: A History. New York: Lewis Historical Publishing Company, Inc. OCLC 22524006.
- Paine, Henry Delaven (1883). Paine Family Records: A Journal of Genealogical and Biographical Information Respecting the American Families of Payne, Paine, Payn, &c. (Volume II). Albany, New York: J. Munsell. OCLC 247490136.(Full text via the Internet Archive.)
- Sylvester, Nathaniel Bartlett (1880). History of Rensselaer Co., New York with Illustrations and Biographical Sketches of its Prominent Men and Pioneers. Philadelphia: Everts & Peck. OCLC 3496287.
- Weise, Arthur James (1880). History of the Seventeen Towns of Rensselaer County from the Colonization of the Manor of Rensselaerwyck to the Present Time. Troy, New York: J. M. Francis & Tucker. OCLC 6637788.(Full text via the Internet Archive.)

Preceded by William Lape	Supervisor of the Town of Brunswick; 1856–1857	Succeeded by Alanson Cook
