= Howard–Odmin–Sherman Farmstead =

- U.S. National Register of Historic Places
- Location within New York Location within the United States
- Location: 393 Croll Road, Pittstown, New York
- Coordinates: 42°51′52″N 73°30′55″W
- Area: 113 acres (46 ha)
- Built: c. 1840
- Architectural style: Greek Revival, Italianate
- MPS: Farmsteads of Pittstown, New York MPS
- NRHP reference No.: 14000130
- Added to NRHP: April 7, 2014

Howard–Odmin–Sherman Farmstead, also known as the Hidden Pond Farm, is a historic home and farm located at Pittstown, Rensselaer County, New York. The farmhouse was built about 1860, and consists of a two-story, three-bay, frame dwelling with a one-story rear ell in a transitional Greek Revival / Italianate style. Also on the property are the contributing carriage barn (c. 1840-1860), outbuilding (c. 1840-1860), grain house (c. 1840-1860), main barn (c. 1870), henhouse (c. 1940s), turkey coop (c. 1930), small outbuilding (c. 1900), and two pole barns (c. 1960).

It was listed on the National Register of Historic Places in 2014.
