= Tomhannock Methodist Episcopal Church =

Historic church in New York, United States

- U.S. National Register of Historic Places
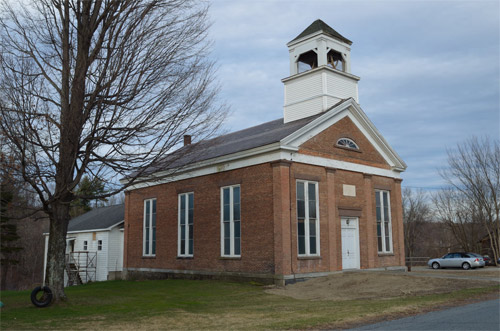

- Location within New York Location within the United States
- Location: Tomhannock Rd., Pittstown, New York
- Coordinates: 42°52′07.4″N 73°32′48.9″W42°52'07.4"N 73°32'48.9"W
- Area: 2.67 acres (1.08 ha)
- Built: 1845
- Built by: Brown, Roswell
- Architectural style: Greek Revival
- NRHP reference No.: 14000262
- Added to NRHP: May 27, 2014

Tomhannock Methodist Episcopal Church is a historic Methodist Episcopal church located at Pittstown, Rensselaer County, New York.

== History ==
It was built in 1845, and is a one-story, vernacular Greek Revival style brick church building with a front gable roof. It is topped by an open belfry topped by a low pyramidal roof. The interior was remodeled in 1871 and 1896. A two-story frame addition was built about 1980 to replace a two-story social hall added in 1855. The church was abandoned by United Methodist Conference in 2010 and subsequently adapted for municipal purposes.

It was listed on the National Register of Historic Places in 2014.
