= William Henry Freeman =

American Civil War Medal of Honor recipient (1844-1911)

William H. Freeman
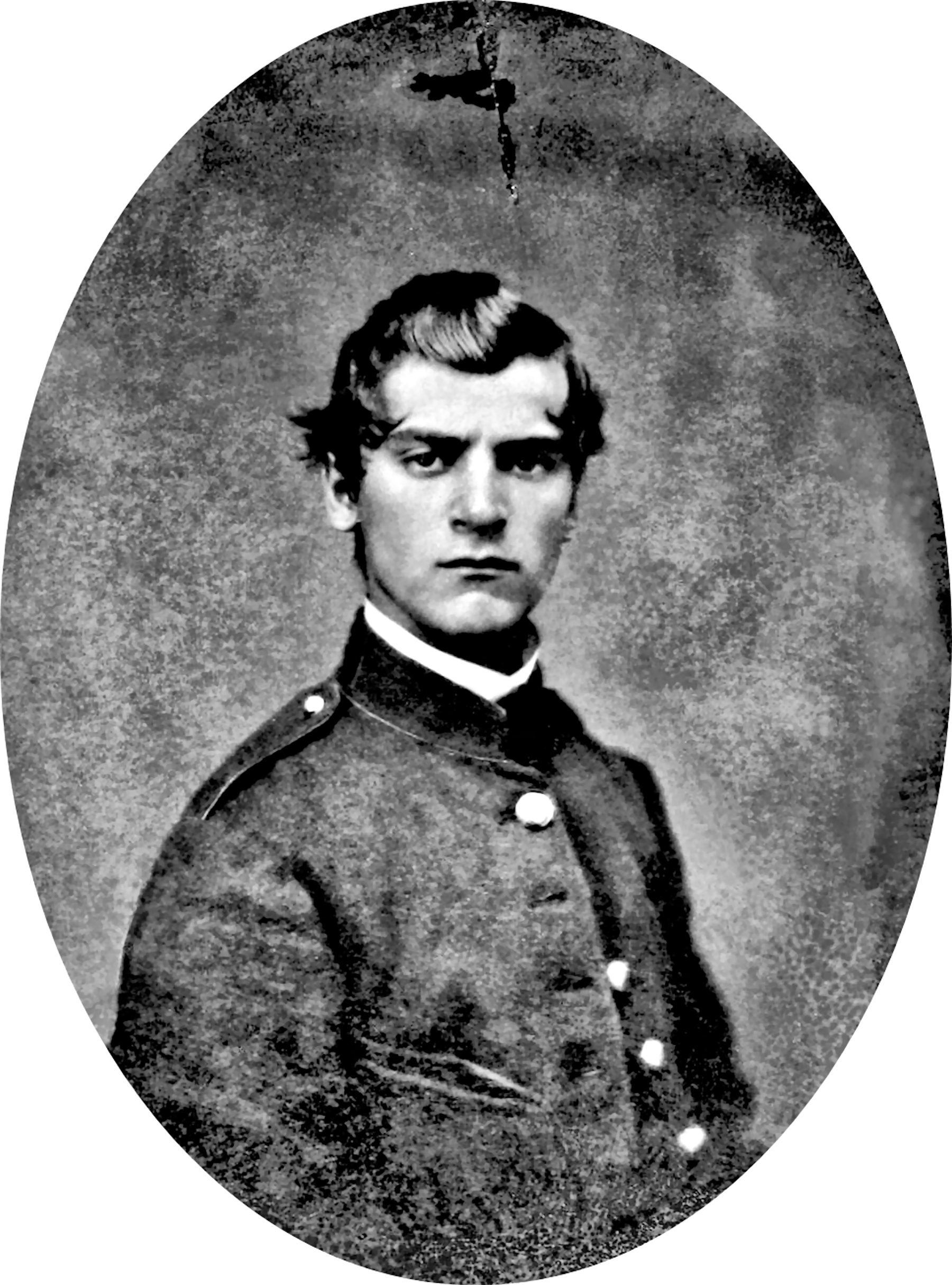
- Freeman c. 1865
- Born: May 10, 1844; Troy, New York, US
- Died: August 26, 1911 (aged 67); New York, US
- Burial place: Oakwood Cemetery, Troy, New York
- Military career
- Allegiance: United States; Union
- Branch: United States Army; Union Army
- Service years: 1862 - 1865
- Rank: Private
- Units: Company B, 169th New York Volunteer Infantry
- Conflicts: American Civil War • Second Battle of Fort Fisher
- Awards: Medal of Honor

William Henry Freeman (May 10, 1844 – August 26, 1911) was a Union Army soldier during the American Civil War. He received the Medal of Honor for gallantry during the Second Battle of Fort Fisher on January 15, 1865.

== Military service ==
Freeman enlisted in the Army from his birthplace of Troy, New York in September 1862, and was assigned to Company B of the 169th New York Volunteer Infantry.

On January 15, 1865, the North Carolina Confederate stronghold of Fort Fisher was taken by a combined Union storming party of sailors, marines, and soldiers under the command of Admiral David Dixon Porter and General Alfred Terry.

Freeman mustered out with his regiment in July 1865.

== Medal of Honor citation ==
For The President of the United States of America, in the name of Congress, takes pleasure in presenting the Medal of Honor to Private William Henry Freeman, United States Army, for extraordinary heroism on 15 January 1865, while serving with Company B, 169th New York Infantry, in action at Fort Fisher, North Carolina. Private Freeman volunteered to carry the brigade flag after the bearer was wounded.

General Orders: Date of Issue: May 27, 1905

Action Date: January 15, 1865

Service: Army

Rank: Private

Company: Company B

Division: 169th New York Infantry

== See also ==
- List of Medal of Honor recipients
- List of American Civil War Medal of Honor recipients: A–F
