= Coletti–Rowland–Agan Farmstead =

- U.S. National Register of Historic Places
- U.S. Historic district
- Location within New York Location within the United States
- Location: 82 Cooksboro Rd., Pittstown, New York
- Coordinates: 42°48′16″N 73°33′50″W
- Area: 112.07 acres (45.35 ha)
- Built: c. 1830-1963
- Architectural style: Greek Revival
- MPS: Farmsteads of Pittstown, New York MPS
- NRHP reference No.: 13000631
- Added to NRHP: August 27, 2013

Coletti–Rowland–Agan Farmstead is a historic farm and national historic district located at Pittstown, Rensselaer County, New York. The farm property consists of an East Farm and a West Farm. The East Farm includes a house (c. 1890), shop barn (c. 1850), tractor shed (c. 1850, c. 1900-1930), hen house (c. 1930), dairy barn (c. 1900, moved c. 1912), horse barn (c. 1910), oat barn (c. 1900), and tool barn (c. 1910) The West Farm farmhouse was about 1870, and has a 2 1/2-story, Greek Revival style main block with two 1 1/2-story additions. Also on the property are the contributing shed (c. 1850), horse barn (c. 1870-1890), garage (c. 1920), main barn group (c. 1860, c. 1810-1840), milk house (c. 1910), oat house (c. 1850), and two corn cribs (c. 1850, c. 1920).

It was listed on the National Register of Historic Places in 2013.
