= Kʰunamokwst Park =

Public park in Portland, Oregon, U.S.

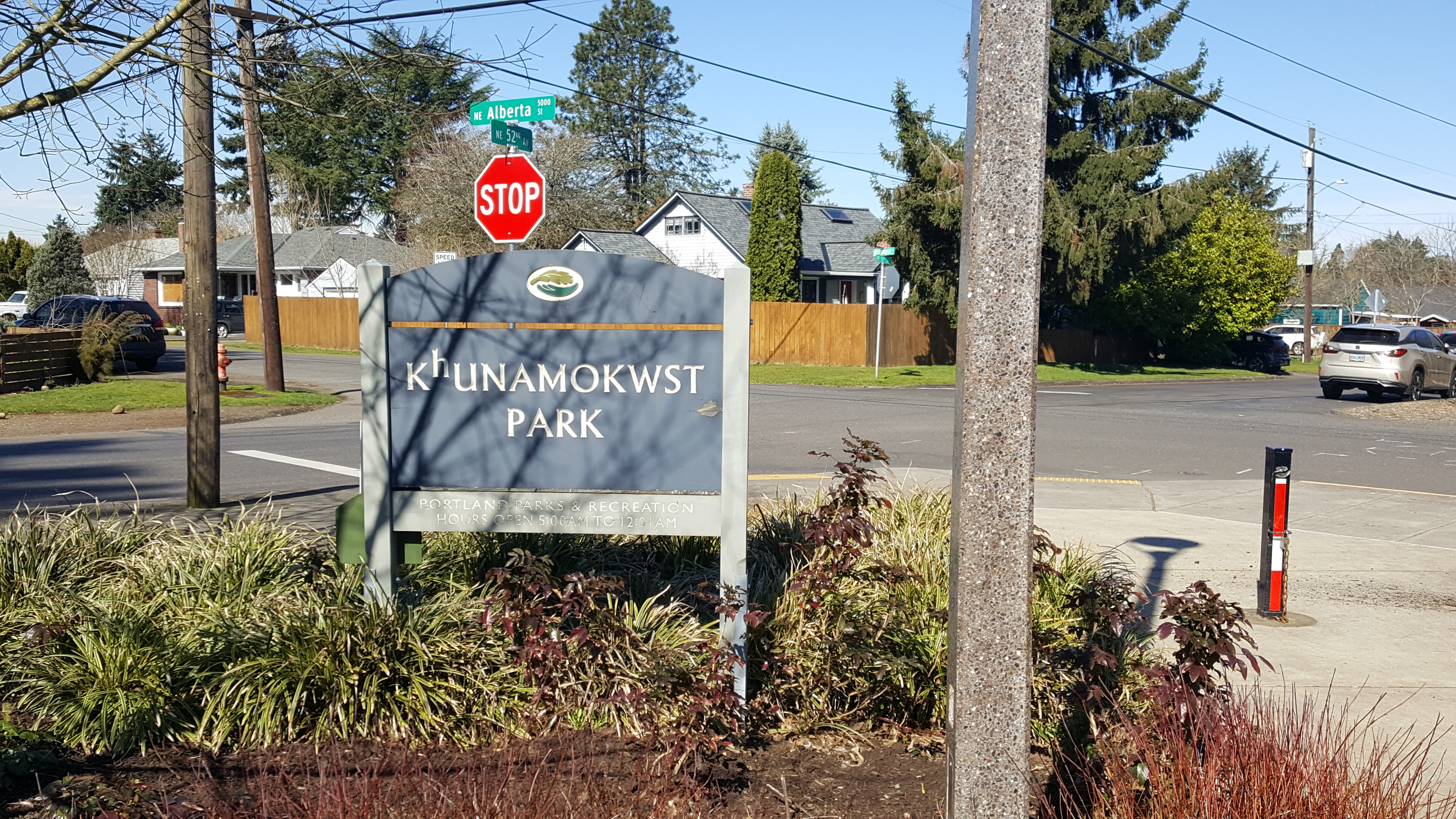
- Park sign, 2022

- Location within Oregon
- Location: NE 52nd Ave. and Alberta St. Portland, Oregon, United States
- Coordinates: 45.5588°N 122.6089°W
- Area: 2.43 acres (0.98 ha)
- Opened: May 16, 2015
- Etymology: Chinook Jargon kʰanumakwst, "together"
- Operator: Portland Parks & Recreation

Kʰunamokwst Park (/ˈkɑːn.ə.ˌmɒkst/ KAHN-ə-MOKST) is a public park in Portland, Oregon's Cully neighborhood, in the United States. Its name is from the Chinook Jargon word kʰanumakwst, meaning "together."

== Description and history ==
The 2.43-acre (0.98 ha) park was acquired in 2009 and dedicated in 2015. According to the City of Portland, the park is the first operated by Portland Parks & Recreation "to enjoy a name indigenous to the land it sits on".

Kʰunamokwst Park has a play structure, a skate park, and a water feature.
