= John Alphonsus Murphy =

United States Marine Corps Medal of Honor recipient

- Born: July 28, 1881; New York City, New York
- Died: November 29, 1935 (aged 54); Portland, Oregon, U.S.
- Military career
- Allegiance: United States
- Branch: United States Marine Corps
- Service years: 1897 - 1906
- Rank: Sergeant
- Conflicts: Boxer Rebellion
- Awards: Medal of Honor

John Alphonsus Murphy (February 26, 1881 – November 29, 1935) was an American drummer serving in the United States Marine Corps during the Boxer Rebellion who received the Medal of Honor for bravery.

== Biography ==
Murphy was born February 26, 1881, in New York City, New York and enlisted into the Marine Corps from Washington, D.C. January 5, 1897. After entering the Marine Corps he was sent to fight in the Chinese Boxer Rebellion. He received the Medal for his actions in Peking, China from July 21-August 17, 1900 and it was presented to him December 11, 1901. He died November 29, 1935 and is buried in the Rose City Cemetery.

== Medal of Honor citation. ==
Rank and organization: Drummer, U.S. Marine Corps. Born: 26 February 1881, New York, N.Y. Accredited to: Washington, D.C. G.O. No.: 55, 19 July 1901.

Citation:

In the presence of the enemy during the action at Peking, China, 21 July to 17 August 1900, Murphy distinguished himself by meritorious conduct.

== See also ==
- List of Medal of Honor recipients
- List of Medal of Honor recipients for the Boxer Rebellion
