= Sacajawea Park =

Park in Portland, Oregon, U.S.

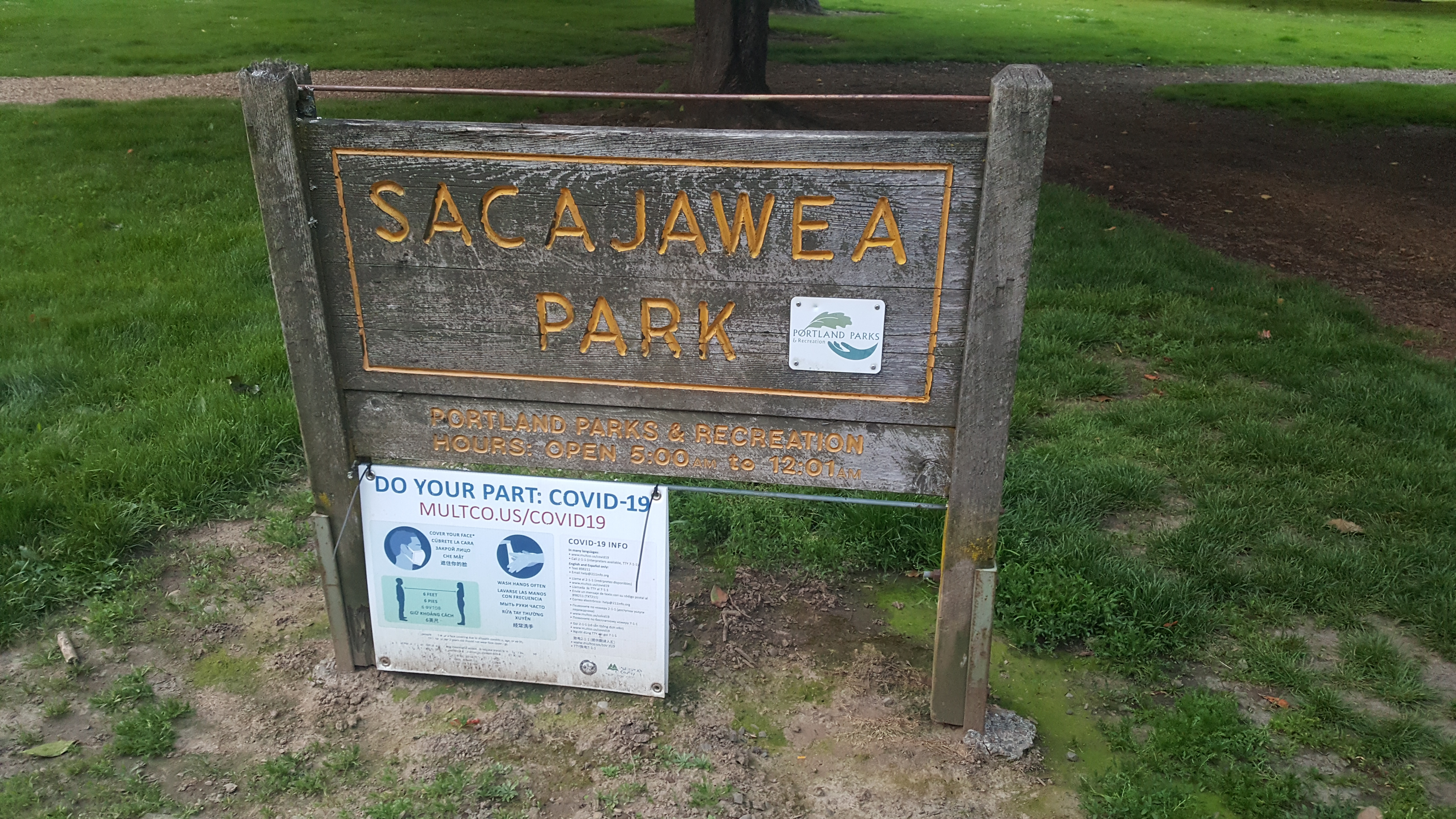
- Park sign, 2022
- Interactive map of Sacajawea Park
- Location: NE 75th and Roselawn St. Portland, Oregon
- Coordinates: 45°33′32″N 122°35′9″W
- Area: 4.86 acres (1.97 ha)
- Operator: Portland Parks & Recreation

Sacajawea Park is a public park in northeast Portland, Oregon's Cully neighborhood, in the United States. Managed by Portland Parks & Recreation, the 4.86-acre (1.97 ha) park was acquired in 1985 and has an off-leash area.

In 2013, approximately 30 volunteers renovated the park in partnership with the Portland Trail Blazers and Banfield Pet Hospital.

In 2026, Cully neighbors started a petition urging Portland Parks and Recreation and Portland Bureau of Transportation to create an opening on the west side of the park to allow pedestrians and cyclists through. The local neighborhood association scheduled a public meeting in June 2026 to gather neighborhood input. A gate was installed at the 74th and Alberta Street entrance to the park in August 2026.
