= Marsh–Link–Pollock Farm =

- U.S. National Register of Historic Places
- Location within New York Location within the United States
- Location: 66 White Church Lane, Brunswick, New York
- Coordinates: 42°44′16″N 73°33′14″W
- Area: 107.55 acres (43.52 ha)
- Built: c. 1840
- Architectural style: Greek Revival
- MPS: Farmsteads of Pittstown, New York MPS
- NRHP reference No.: 14001072
- Added to NRHP: December 22, 2014

Marsh–Link–Pollock Farm, also known as the Pollock Farm, is a historic home and farm located at Brunswick, Rensselaer County, New York. The farmhouse was built about 1840, and is a two-story, "L"-plan, Greek Revival style timber frame dwelling with a one-story rear ell. The original section was expanded in the 1920s to its present size. Also on the property are the contributing main barn, a small light-frame barn that was used for calves and a concrete block cow barn with a silo (c. 1959).

It was listed on the National Register of Historic Places in 2014.
