= Rose City Cemetery =

Cemetery in Portland, Oregon, U.S.

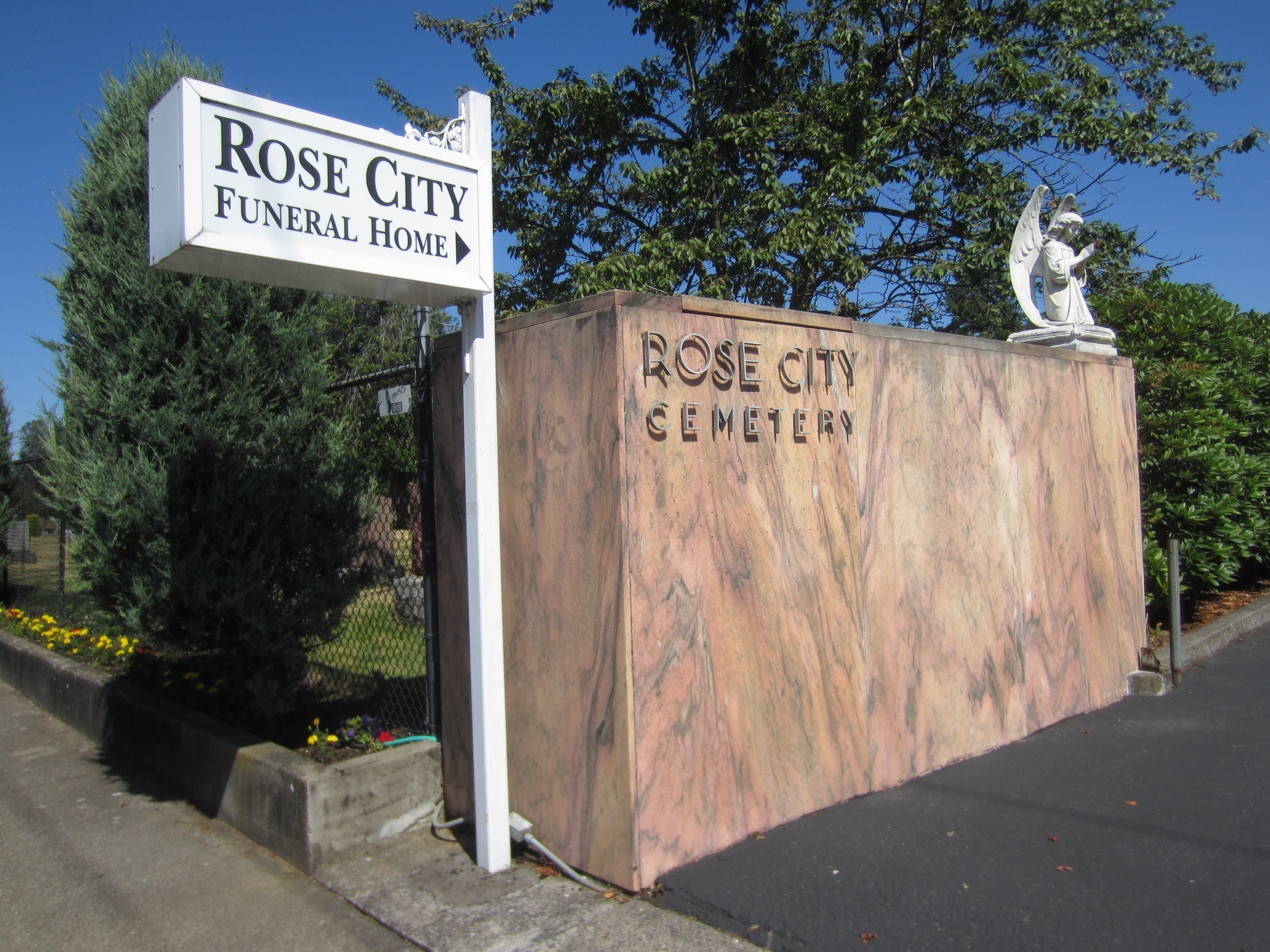
- Signage at the entrance, 2019
- Interactive map of Rose City Cemetery

Details
- Established: 1906
- Location: Portland, Oregon
- Country: United States
- Coordinates: 45°32′59″N 122°36′32″W
- No. of interments: >40,000
- Website: rosecityfuneralhome.com
- Find a Grave: Rose City Cemetery

Rose City Cemetery, also known as Rose City Cemetery and Funeral Home, is a cemetery in northeast Portland, Oregon's Cully neighborhood, in the United States.

== History ==
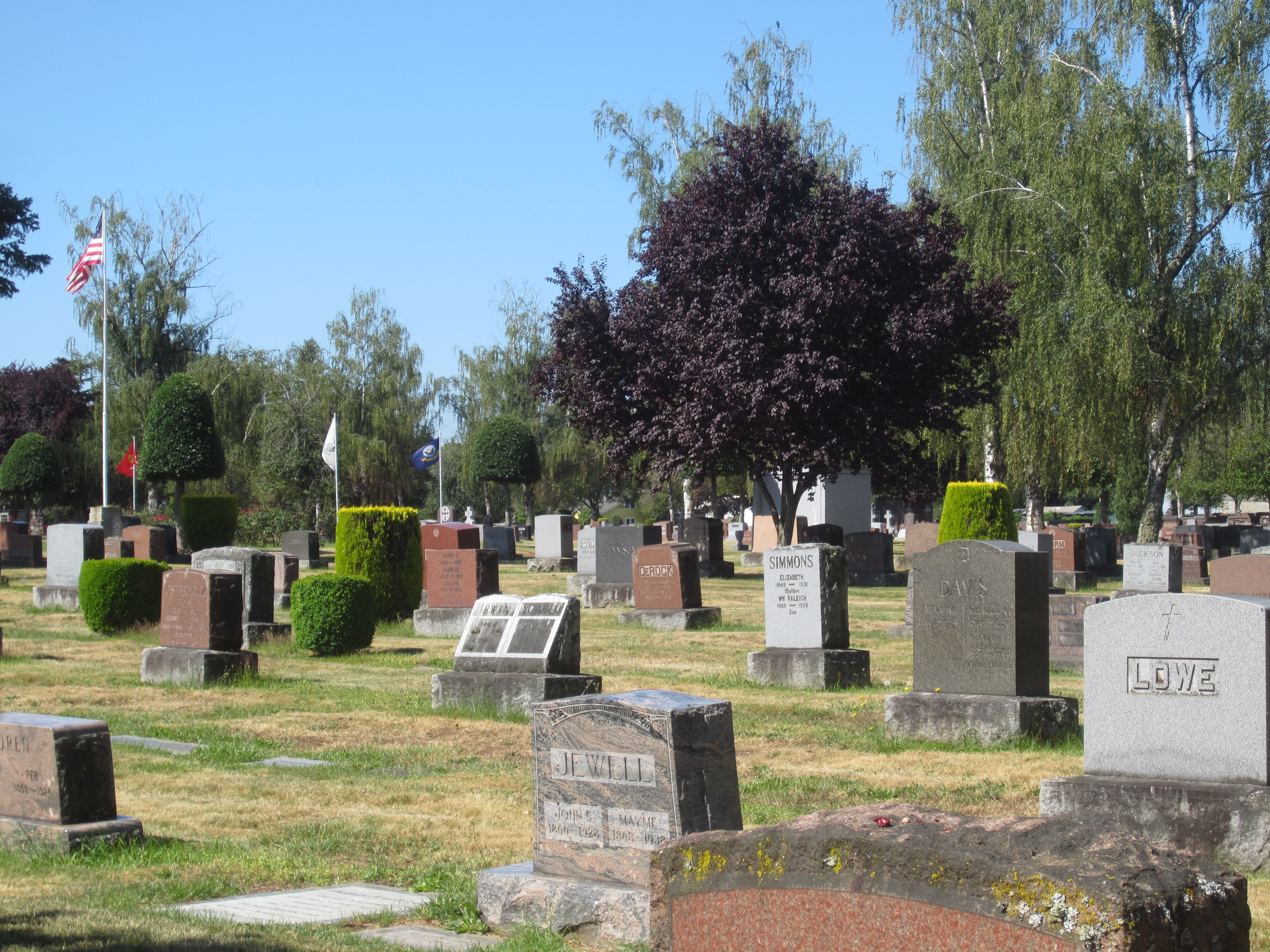
The cemetery in 2019

Leaders of the Japanese Association, which became the Nikkei Jin Kai after World War II, purchased a large portion of the cemetery. In 2005, the Japanese Ancestral Society became the cemetery's title holder. The organization continues to administer an endowment to maintain the cemetery.

== Notable burials ==
- Alaric B. Chapin (1848–1924), Civil War Medal of Honor recipient
- Richard E. Geis (1927–2013), writer
- Theodore Thurston Geer (1851–1924), Oregon Governor
- Don Johnson (1926–2015), MLB pitcher
- John Alphonsus Murphy (1881–1935), Boxer Rebellion Medal of Honor recipient
- A. W. Norblad (1881–1960), Oregon Governor
- Artie Wilson (1920–2010), MLB infielder
