= Cropseyville, New York =

Cropseyville
- Hamlet
- Location in New York
- Coordinates: 42°44′56″N 73°33′26″W
- Country: United States
- State: New York
- County: Rensselaer County
- Town: Brunswick
- Named for: Valentine Cropsey
- Elevation: 280 m (920 ft)
- ZIP Code: 12052
- School districts: Brunswick (Brittonkill) Central School District, Berlin Central School District

Cropseyville is a hamlet in Rensselaer County, New York, United States. It comprises the ZIP code of 12052. It is located east of the city of Troy, in the town of Brunswick.

Cropseyville was named after Valentine Cropsey, a pioneer citizen.

Cropseyville resides in the Brunswick (Brittonkill) Central School District and Berlin Central School District.

Cropseyvilles elevation is 919 feet high (280m)
