= 169th New York Infantry Regiment =

- Active: September 25, 1862, to July 19, 1865
- Country: United States
- Allegiance: Union
- Branch: Infantry
- Engagements: Siege of Suffolk; Second Battle of Charleston Harbor; Bermuda Hundred Campaign; Battle of Chester Station; Battle of Cold Harbor; Siege of Petersburg; Battle of the Crater; Second Battle of Deep Bottom; Battle of Chaffin's Farm; Battle of Fair Oaks & Darbytown Road; First Battle of Fort Fisher; Second Battle of Fort Fisher; Carolinas campaign Battle of Wilmington

The 169th New York Infantry Regiment was an infantry regiment in the Union Army during the American Civil War.

== Service ==
The 169th New York Infantry was organized at Troy and Staten Island, New York. Companies A through E were mustered on September 25, 1862, at Troy. Companies F through K were mustered on October 6, 1862, at Staten Island. The regiment was mustered in under the command of Colonel Clarence Buell.

The regiment was attached to Provisional Brigade, Abercrombie's Division, Defenses of Washington, to February 1863. Military District of Washington, XXII Corps, Department of Washington, to April 1863. Foster's Brigade, Division at Suffolk, VII Corps, Department of Virginia, to April 1863. 2nd Brigade, 1st Division, VII Corps, to July 1863. Foster's Brigade, Vodges' Division, Folly Island, South Carolina, X Corps, Department of the South, to January 1864. 1st Brigade, Folly Island, Northern District, Department of the South, to February 1864. 1st Brigade, Vodges' Division, District of Florida, to April 1864. 2nd Brigade, 3rd Division, X Corps, Army of the James, Department of Virginia and North Carolina, to May 1864. 2nd Brigade, 3rd Division, XVIII Corps, to June 1864. 3rd Brigade, 2nd Division, X Corps, to December 1864. 3rd Brigade, 2nd Division, XXIV Corps, to January 1865. 3rd Brigade, 2nd Division, Terry's Provisional Corps, Department of North Carolina, to March 1865. 3rd Brigade, 2nd Division, X Corps, Army of the Ohio, Department of North Carolina, to July 1865.

The 169th New York Infantry mustered out of service July 19, 1865, at Raleigh, North Carolina.

== Detailed service ==
Left New York for Washington, D. C, October 9, 1862. Duty in the defenses of Washington, D. C., until April 18, 1863. Ordered to Suffolk, Va., April 18. Siege of Suffolk April 20-May 4. Edenton Road April 24. Siege of Suffolk raised May 4. Expedition into Matthews County May 19–22. Expedition to Walkerton and Aylett's June 4–5. Walkerton June 5. Dix's Peninsula Campaign June 24-July 7. Expedition from White House to South Anna River July 1–7. South Anna Bridge July 4. Ordered to the Department of the South, arriving at Folly Island, S.C., July 12. Siege of Forts Wagner and Gregg, Morris Island, S.C., and operations against Fort Sumter and Charleston August 12-September 7. Bombardment of Fort Sumter and Charleston August 17–23. Capture of Forts Wagner and Gregg September 7. Operations against Charleston and picket duty on Folly and Black Islands, S.C., until February 1864. Expedition to Johns and James Islands February 6–14. Ordered to Jacksonville, Fla., February 20, and duty there until April. Expedition to Cedar Creek March 2. Ordered to Yorktown, Va., April 21. Butler's operations on south side of the James River and against Petersburg and Richmond May 4–28. Port Walthall Junction, Chester Station, May 6–7. Chester Station May 10. Operations against Fort Darling May 12–16. Battle of Drury's Bluff May 14–16. Port Walthall Junction May 16. Bermuda Hundred May 16–27. Moved to White House, then to Cold Harbor May 28–31. Battles about Cold Harbor June 1–12. Before Petersburg June 15–18. Siege operations against Petersburg and Richmond June 16 to December 7. In the trenches before Petersburg and on the Bermuda Hundred front until August. Demonstration north of the James River August 13–20. Dutch Gap August 13. Strawberry Plains August 14–18. Battle of Chaffin's Farm, New Market Heights, September 28–30. Battle of Fair Oaks October 27–28. In the trenches before Richmond until December 7. Expedition to Fort Fisher, N.C., December 7–27. 2nd Expedition to Fort Fisher, N.C., January 3–15, 1865. Assault and capture of Fort Fisher January 15. Cape Fear Entrenchment's February 11–13. Sugar Loaf Battery February 11. Fort Anderson February 18–19. Capture of Wilmington February 22. Carolinas Campaign March 1-April 26. Advance on Goldsboro March 6–21. Advance on Raleigh April 9–13. Occupation of Raleigh April 14. Bennett's House April 26. Surrender of Johnston and his army. Duty in North Carolina until July.

== Casualties ==
The regiment lost a total of 285 men during service; 10 officers and 147 enlisted men killed or mortally wounded, 3 officers and 125 enlisted men died of disease.

== Commanders ==
- Colonel Clarence Buell
- Colonel John McConihe - killed in action June 1, 1864 at the Battle of Cold Harbor
- Colonel Alonzo Alden

== Notable members ==
- Captain Joseph H. Allen, Company C - New York municipal politician and industrialist
- Private William H. Freeman, Company B - Medal of Honor recipient for action at the Second Battle of Fort Fisher

== See also ==
- List of New York Civil War regiments
- New York in the Civil War
