= Pittstown, New York =

- Town
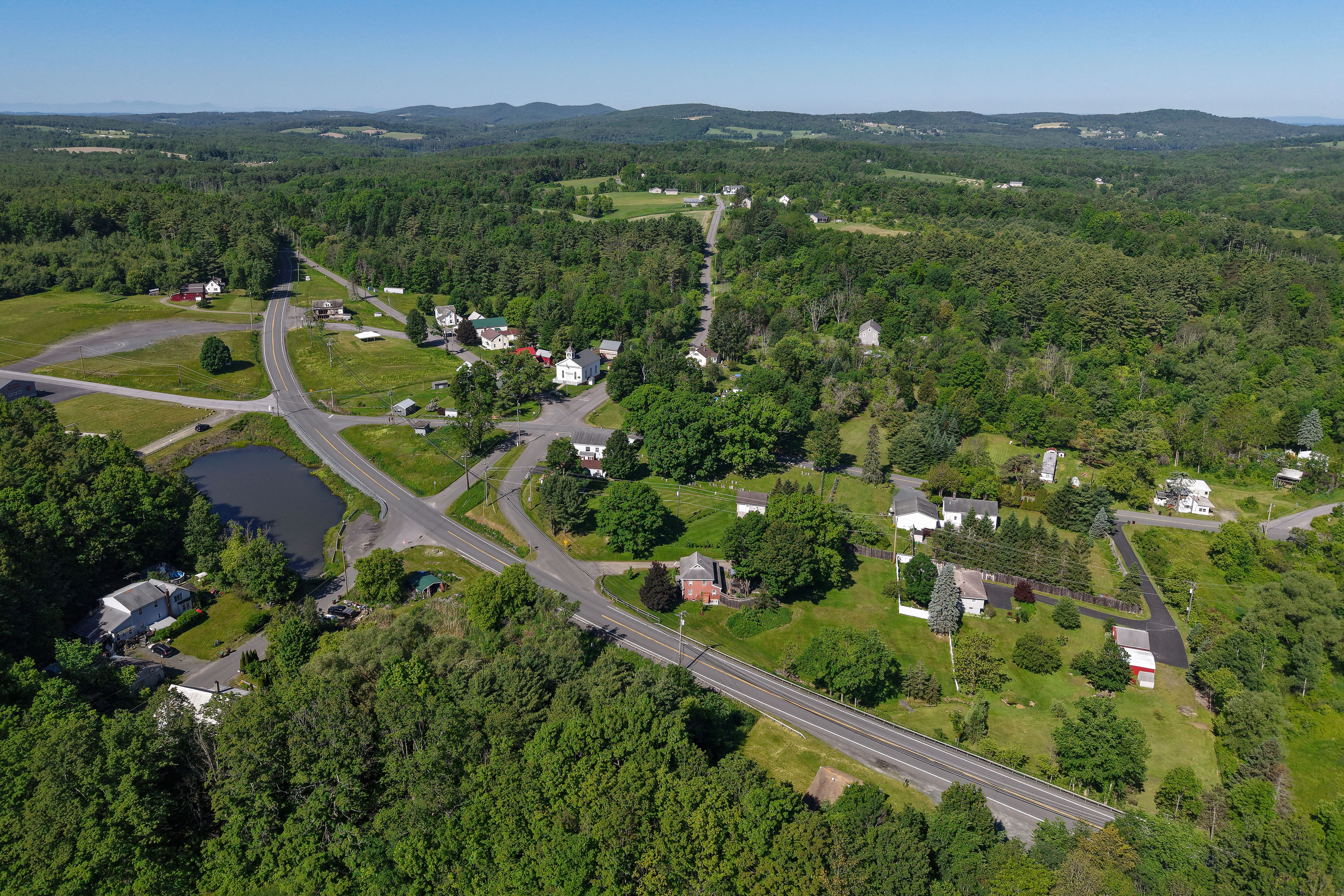
- Pittstown (2026)

- Location in Rensselaer County and the state of New York.
- Coordinates: 42°53′N 73°30′W
- Country: United States
- State: New York
- County: Rensselaer

Area
  - Total: 64.84 sq mi (167.94 km^{2})
  - Land: 61.63 sq mi (159.62 km^{2})
  - Water: 3.22 sq mi (8.33 km^{2})
- Elevation: 679 ft (207 m)

Population (2020)
  - Total: 5,540
  - Density: 89.9/sq mi (34.7/km^{2})
- Time zone: UTC-5 (Eastern (EST))
  - Summer (DST): UTC-4 (EDT)
- FIPS code: 36-58398
- GNIS feature ID: 0979373
- Website: https://www.townofpittstown.org/

Pittstown is a town in Rensselaer County, New York, United States. The population was 5,540 at the 2020 census. It is in the northern part of the county.

A small part of the northern town line is Rensselaer County's border with Washington County. Moving west, the Hoosic River defines the town's northwestern line to the crux of its border with the town of Schaghticoke, which juts south to form the western town line. The towns of Brunswick and Grafton border to the southwest and southeast, respectively, with the town of Hoosick to the east.

The majority of the town is served by the Hoosic Valley Central School District, while the southern part of the town is serviced by Brunswick (Brittonkill) Central School District, with a portion of the eastern part of the town served by the Hoosick Falls Central School District.

== History ==
The town is one of the original towns in the county and was created in 1788, from a patent dated 1761.

The Coletti–Rowland–Agan Farmstead, Howard–Odmin–Sherman Farmstead, and Tomhannock Methodist Episcopal Church are listed on the National Register of Historic Places.

== Geography ==
New York State Route 67 runs along the Hoosic River, which defines the northeast town line.

In western Pittstown, a manmade body of water, the Tomhannock Reservoir, provides water to the residents of the city of Troy.

The Pittstown State Forest is in the southeast corner of the town, where New York State Route 7 runs along the northern edge of the Rensselaer Plateau.

According to the United States Census Bureau, the town has a total area of 64.8 square miles (168 km^{2}), of which, 61.7 square miles (160 km^{2}) of it is land (95.2%) and 3.1 square miles (8.0 km^{2}) of it is water (4.8%).

== Demographics ==
Historical population
Census	Pop.	Note	%±
1820	3,772		—
1830	3,702		−1.9%
1840	3,784		2.2%
1850	3,732		−1.4%
1860	3,826		2.5%
1870	4,093		7.0%
1880	4,095		0.0%
1890	4,056		−1.0%
1900	3,236		−20.2%
1910	2,920		−9.8%
1920	2,342		−19.8%
1930	2,426		3.6%
1940	2,491		2.7%
1950	2,666		7.0%
1960	2,973		11.5%
1970	3,905		31.3%
1980	4,901		25.5%
1990	5,468		11.6%
2000	5,644		3.2%
2010	5,735		1.6%
2020	5,540		−3.4%
U.S. Decennial Census

As of the census of 2000, there were 5,644 people, 1,993 households, and 1,548 families residing in the town. The population density was 91.4 inhabitants per square mile (35.3/km^{2}). There were 2,142 housing units at an average density of 34.7 per square mile (13.4/km^{2}). The racial makeup of the town was 97.84% White, 0.48% African American, 0.44% Native American, 0.30% Asian, 0.16% from other races, and 0.78% from two or more races. Hispanic or Latino of any race were 0.66% of the population.

There were 1,993 households, out of which 39.6% had children under the age of 18 living with them, 63.4% were married couples living together, 9.0% had a female householder with no husband present, and 22.3% were non-families. 17.1% of all households were made up of individuals, and 6.4% had someone living alone who was 65 years of age or older. The average household size was 2.83 and the average family size was 3.20.

In the town, the population was spread out, with 28.8% under the age of 18, 7.3% from 18 to 24, 30.5% from 25 to 44, 23.8% from 45 to 64, and 9.5% who were 65 years of age or older. The median age was 36 years. For every 100 females, there were 100.4 males. For every 100 females age 18 and over, there were 100.4 males.

The median income for a household in the town was $49,968, and the median income for a family was $52,194. Males had a median income of $35,173 versus $28,720 for females. The per capita income for the town was $18,578. About 4.3% of families and 6.0% of the population were below the poverty line, including 7.7% of those under age 18 and 9.2% of those age 65 or over.

== Communities and locations in Pittstown ==
- Boyntonville – A hamlet near the eastern town line on Route 7.
- East Pittstown – A hamlet near the town line, in the northeastern part of the town.
- Factory Hollow – A hamlet.
- Johnsonville – A hamlet in the northern part of the town by the Hoosick River. In 1825, a bridge was built here across the Hoosic River.
- Little Red Schoolhouse – A hamlet southeast of Valley Falls.
- Millertown – A hamlet in the northern part of the town, east of Valley Falls. It was also known as "North Pittstown."
- Raymertown – A hamlet southwest of the Tomhannock Reservoir and in the southwestern part of the town, on Route 7. The community was named after the local Raymer family.
- Tomhannock – A hamlet northeast of Tomhannock Reservoir. It was once known as "Reeds Hollow."
- Tomhannock Reservoir – A reservoir in the southwestern part of the town.
- Valley Falls – The Village of Valley Falls is in the northwestern part of the town.
- Redemption Christian Academy - Private christian school
