= Brunswick, New York =

Town in the United States

Brunswick
- Town
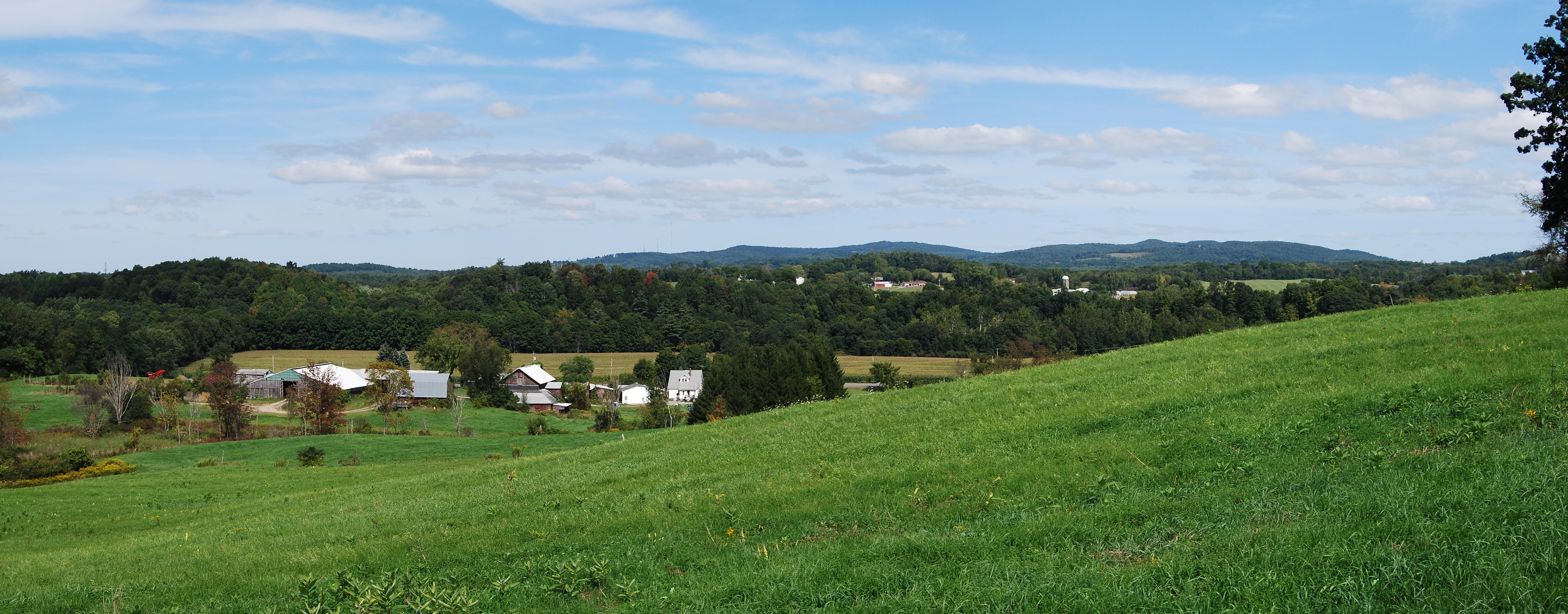
- Skyline of Brunswick from Pinewoods Avenue

- Flag Seal

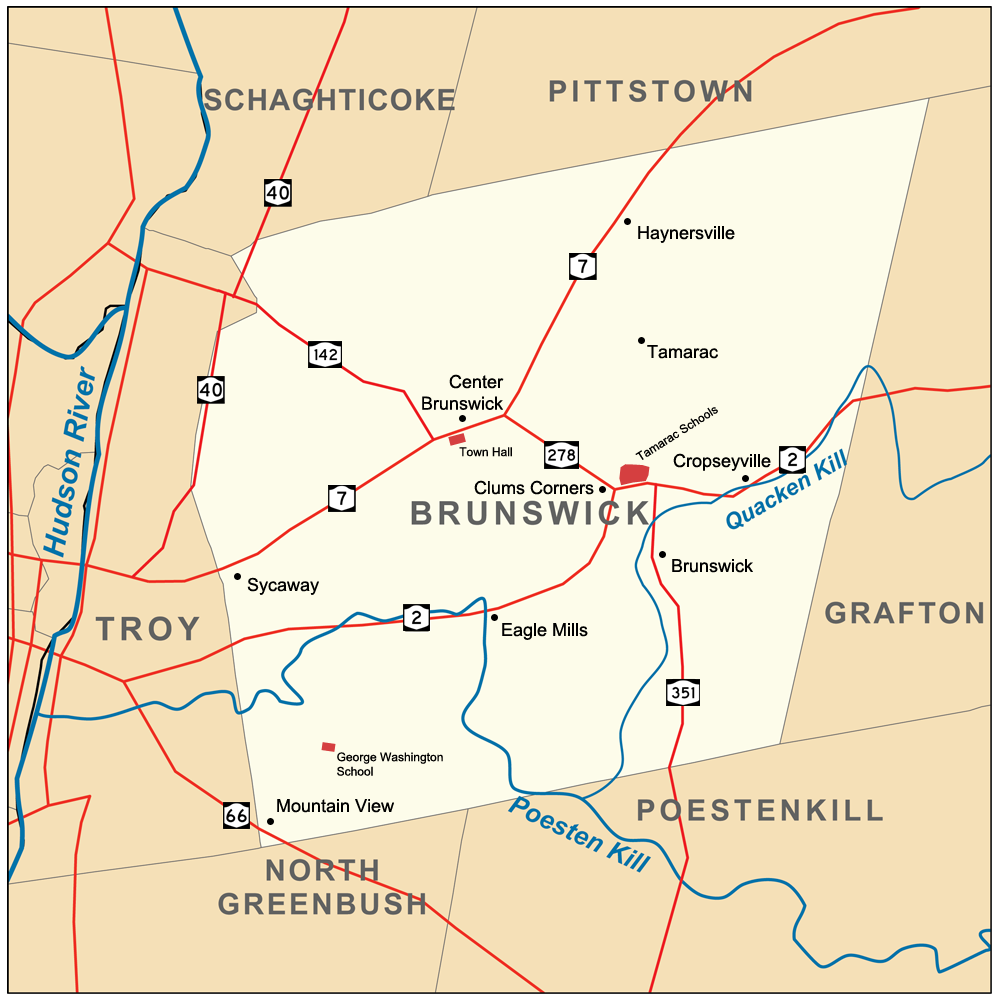
- Map of Brunswick and its major thoroughfares

- Location in Rensselaer County and the state of New York.

- Location within New York
- Coordinates: 42°44′57″N 73°35′23″W
- Country: United States
- State: New York
- County: Rensselaer
- Settled: 1715
- Incorporated: 1807

Government
  - Supervisor: Philip H. Herrington (Republican)
  - Town Board: Members' List: Mark J. Balistreri; Gordon Christian; James Sullivan; Daniel Casale
  - Town Justices: Members' List: Lawrence Kronau; Terrance Buchanan

Area
  - Total: 44.63 sq mi (115.58 km^{2})
  - Land: 44.35 sq mi (114.86 km^{2})
  - Water: 0.28 sq mi (0.73 km^{2})
- Elevation: 509 ft (155 m)

Population (2020)
  - Total: 12,581
  - Density: 283.69/sq mi (109.53/km^{2})
- Time zone: UTC-5 (Eastern (EST))
  - Summer (DST): UTC-4 (EDT)
- ZIP code: 12180
- Area code: 518
- FIPS code: 36-10275
- GNIS feature ID: 0978762
- Website: Town of Brunswick

Brunswick is a town in Rensselaer County, New York, United States. The municipality was originally settled in the early 18th century. During its history, it had been part of Albany County, Rensselaerswyck, and Troy, before its incorporation in 1807. It is bordered on the west by the city of Troy; on the north by Schaghticoke and Pittstown; on the east by Grafton; and on the south by Poestenkill and North Greenbush. The population was 12,581 at the 2020 census. The source of the town's name is not certain, though some claim it comes from the source of its first inhabitants from the province of Brunswick-Lüneburg in Germany.

The town was historically agricultural, but began experiencing suburban sprawl in the later decades of the 20th century, which continues currently. Historically, most of the developments have occurred around the town's two major thoroughfares: New York Route 7 and New York Route 2, known locally as Hoosick Road and Brunswick Road, respectively. (Note: For the remainder of this article, New York Route 7 and New York Route 2 will solely be referred to as Hoosick Road and Brunswick Road, respectively, unless necessity presents itself otherwise.) Brunswick became a popular place to settle in upon the completion of the local highway system in the Capital District, especially the upgrade of Route 7 into a four-lane highway in the 1980s.

== History ==
=== Colonial era ===
The first settlement in Brunswick dates to 1711 to 1715 at Haynersville. Since Haynersville is located just at the current town line with Pittstown, it is currently impossible to be more specific about dates without knowing on which side of the town line various individual farms were.

In the records, Haynersville was first called simply "Hosek Road". This is in reference to the public manor road that went north from the manor along the east side of the Hudson to where Troy now is, and then turned east across the area to Hoosick on the Vermont border, (the latter half of the road is basically today's Route 7, and is still known as Hoosick Road).

The Hoosick Road was a vital link to the then frontier settlement at Hoosick, (settled in 1688), and which formed a link to both Bennington, Vermont and Williamstown. Until the 1790s, the government at Albany claimed Vermont, and its only practical connection to Vermont was by the Hoosick Road.

German Palatines had settled in Livingston's Manor, south of Rensselaer's Manor. Many of these were volunteers during Queen Anne's War in an expedition against Canada in 1711, led locally by Peter Schuyler, "and several finding the country north of them pleasant and desirable, determined, so soon as convenient after their return and discharge, to locate there". Johannes Jung, Job. Adam Freiderich, Georg Shaffer, Phillip Kelmer, Stephen Froelich, Andreas Bergman, Ludowig W. Schmidt, Job. Schneider, were in an initial group prior to 1715, and Coenraet Ham, Jans Witbeck and Hans Jury Kolemer, came in 1715. The last named individual settled within the manor and therefore within the town.

In 1724, there was another campaign against Canada, and which produced a similar exodus of discontented veterans from the Livingston Manor to Brunswick, including Johannes Heener (Hayner), Peter Phillips, Peter Lamp-Man, Johannes Heinrich Conrad, and Olrig and Philip Barnet. Paul Dirk (Derrick) and Peter Ham were the first settlers of Center Brunswick. Paul Derrick's manor farm still stands as the rear section of the farmhouse at 936 Hoosick Road.

Of the earliest church records for the Gilead Lutheran Church, consisting of several dated receipts, the earliest is from 1746. Their first minister, Peter Nicholas Sommer, began his ministry at Haynersville and adjoining areas in 1743.

In the 1740s and 1750s, van Rensselaer as patroon of the manor gave land for the erection of a church, and for the support of a minister at Hosek Road, (Haynersville). Barnett also gives the text of a document from 1769 in the records of the Gilead Lutheran Church:

When it had pleased the Almighty and Merciful God in His goodness to plant the Evangelical Lutheran Church in this American part of the world also, and especially in the State of New York, during the reign of Queen Anna, and also in this neighborhood and district called Hosek Road, in Rensselaerwyck, Albany County, then more than twenty years ago, a small body of adherents of the above said Lutheran church, disposed to that end did build and erect a prayer and church House to the Honor of God, and for their convenience, upon that lot of ground which our most worthy Patroon generously gave to promote and perpetuate the service of God and for the better maintenance of our preacher, for which purpose he presented us with a Deed of Gift which We acknowledge with heartfelt thanks towards our Good Lord in Heaven, and that in addition He grants us all hereabouts by His grace that we through the permission of the Government are allowed to carry on our pure Lutheran church service free and without hindrance.

Barnett concludes that 'more than twenty years' before 1769 roughly corresponds to Sommer's appointment as minister, and that sometime between 1743 and 1749, the first church in Brunswick was built. It was referred to as the log church, and was probably a simple structure.

From this beginning there was an increase, but not without conflict. "During the wars of 1745 and 1754 between the English and French, all this region north of Albany was marked by frequent atrocities perpetrated by the Savage allies of the French, and twice at least the majority of the settlers fled from their homes in terror, retiring to Livingston Manor and other points down the river, some of whom never returned." One particularly notorious incident was the burning of Hoosick, outside Brunswick, by the French in August 1754. Matters did not settle until the collapse of the French at Quebec in 1760. "When these troubles were finally at an end, the inducements offered to settlers by the lord of the Manor attracted many emigrants, not only Germans, but Dutch, English, Scotch, Irish and French as well."

Peace also brought the first tavern in the area, run by a John Tillman, followed by a second tavern in 1772, run by Johannes Hayner, Jr., from which Haynersville, (Hayner's Tavern), eventually got its name.

The first store was opened by Conrad Hayner and Peter Loose at Tamarack, and the first grist mill was built by Johann Heinrich Gross, in 1772, on the Quackenkill.

On the map of the Manor of Rensselaerswyck, drawn in 1767 by John R. Bleecker, there are many names associated with leased parcels, especially in the western part of the town and in Haynersville. The map shows that settlement had mostly been as far east as present day Center Brunswick and Eagle Mills.

By the 1770s, the original log church became inadequate to the needs of the community, as is made clear in this 1789 public plea.

It is about fourteen Years ago, that the said Members of the (Gilead Lutheran) Congregation, whilst the Number of them did increase, so that the Block Meeting House, where they used to serve the Lord, was too small for them, and the said Meeting house was not fit for any Worship, for fear it might brake down and kill them, so that the took a Notion of building a Church, and they begone it in the year 1775. But the disturbance of the War put soon a Stop to it, so that a great many of the said Members were ruin'd & brought to great Distress and Poverty, so that they was oblig'd to leave of building: but now last Year they have begun again, and did their utmost Endeavour to finish the said Church. It was not their Intention in the least at that Time to molest their Neighbours and Fellow Christians with Collections, for it has the appearance last Fall, as if they should have a promising Crop this Harvest, but that Hope is all lost for the most part of the Grane is kill'd with the Frost, and the Rest is destroy'd by the Insects, and now they have such a heavy Debt to pay, which they are not able to discharge out of their own Pokets: So they are obliged to implore all good-minded Christians who has it in their Hearts to promote the kingdom of Christ to assist them and lay some mite for the said Building of the said Church in the Hands of their Fellow Brothers wiiich they have send for that purpose Namely Albertus Simon and Jacob Weager.

=== Revolutionary War period ===
For Town of Brunswick in the Revolutionary War, the excerpts from Barnett cover the history "Situated, as it was, near the head of navigation on the Hudson, and on the line traversed by the contending forces between New York City and Canada, (the people of Brunswick) naturally suffered many and grievous annoyances from both sides, but principally from the tories. From the first shock of conflict, east of them, in and around Boston, to the battle of Bennington, in sight from high ground and a few miles on the north-east; and the battles just across the river, between the patriot army and that of Burgoyne; and later, they were in constant dread and danger, many abandoning their homes, where all farm work was virtually given up."

"Emmissaries of the British government came among them, who easily persuaded many of the simple people to side with the royalists, but the majority, principally Germans, espoused the cause of freedom, which made it necessary for such as had joined with the tories to flee the country. This gave rise to the separation of families, the disruption of the harmony hitherto existing in the Church and community, and a deadly enmity which led to acts of violence... When Burgoyne's army approached, and General Schuyler with his forces fell back from Fort Edward to the Islands at the mouth of the Mohawk, the people on this side of the Hudson took refuge in Lansingburgh. Abner Roberts, a member of Gilead and an officer of the Continental army, anxious to visit his home,... and, not apprehending any serious danger, crossed to Lansingburgh and alone rode leisurely away, he had barely leached the top of the hill... when he was ambushed by a band of tories, killed and scalped. Several days afterwards his mutilated remains were found where he had fallen. ... Bald Mountain,... was a favorite resort or rallying point for these predatory bands. From its summit they not only had the advantage of a wide view of the surrounding country, but the valley of the Hudson for miles north and south lay open to observation, the importance of which, in carrying out their nefarious schemes, they fully appreciated and employed."

=== Town incorporation ===
The present territory of Brunswick was initially a part of the town of Troy. Troy had been organized as a town in 1791. The growing importance of the prospective city, and its requirements led to a separation of Troy from its rural parts: today's Brunswick and Grafton.

The first town meeting was held at the house of Nathan Betts, a local innkeeper, and continued taking place there for another year. The first town supervisor was Flores Bancker, who held the office from 1807 until 1809. The first town clerk was Daniel Wager, who served for one year. The first three justices of the peace were Robert McChesney, Daniel Wagar, and John McManus. In pursuance of laws enacted under the constitution of 1821, justices of the peace were chosen at the general elections or were appointed by the courts. The election of justices at town meetings began in 1831.

The town did not develop quickly under the manorial system. Although agriculturally productive, since residents did not own the land, there was little incentive to develop properties. That changed after the collapse of Rensselaerswyck in the 1840s.

One short term historical figure was Herman Melville, who in 1840 had been residing with his mother in Lansingburgh, but who taught for a half year at a one room schoolhouse in Brunswick.

Little documentation exists on who took part in the War of 1812. There was significantly more interest in fighting during the Civil War, Brunswick having sent more than 125 men to fight during various times of the war.

The main recreational facility of the town is Vanderhyden Lake, an old reservoir for the city of Troy now used for swimming.

=== Industrial Revolution ===
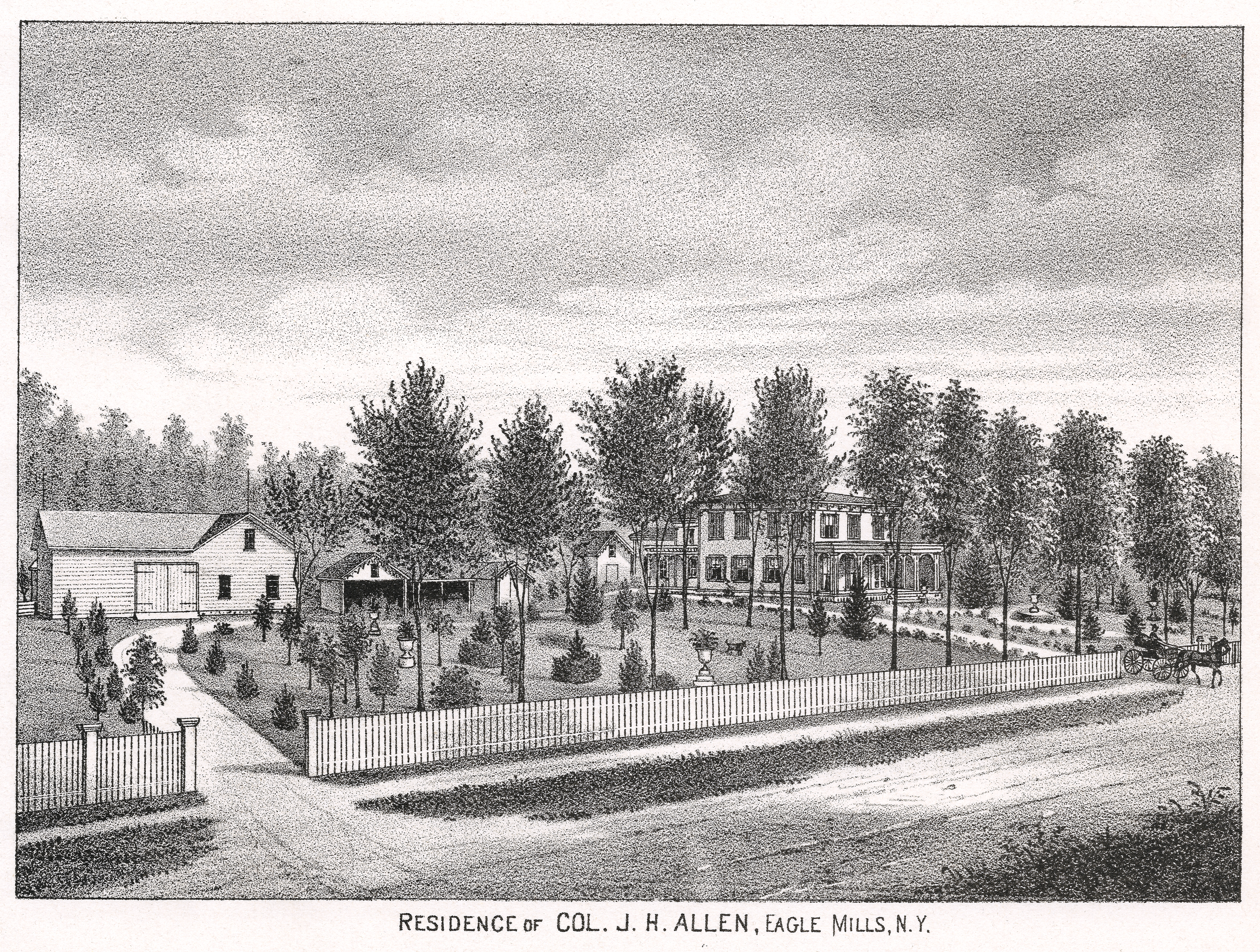
Joseph H. Allen house in 1880, which still stands today

The area of Eagle Mills was a significant industrial area during the mid to late 19th century. Many factories sprung up along the banks of the Poesten Kill due to rapids and a waterfall being located in the area. One such enterprise was the Eagle flour mills, which eventually gave the area its name. The building would change hands multiple times before ending up as Millville Manufacturing Company making augers and then Planters' Hoe Company making hoes. Both companies were under the direction of Joseph H. Allen, who was also supervisor of Brunswick from 1856 to 1857 and a justice of the peace in 1861. Allen closed down Planters' in 1862 to serve in the Civil War. He came out of the war a lieutenant colonel, a position that was awarded to him specifically by President Lincoln. Planters' opened up again after his return to the town. He lived in a house on today's Brunswick Road, which still stands.

=== Late 20th and 21st centuries ===
The Brunswick Historical Society (BHS) began operations in 1974 and was recognized with a state charter in 1981. It has been housed in the Garfield School since 1988.

Brunswick remained mostly rural into the mid and late 20th century. The 1990s brought about expansion along Hoosick Road, with the addition of a Wal-Mart and Price Chopper, along with subsequent strip malls, in 1996. These openings led to interest by developers to build more housing options within the town, which offers quick access to Troy and, subsequently, Interstate 787 and the greater Capital District. With the new commercial developments, residents wouldn't be required to travel to Troy or other places to shop, offering more reasons to move to the town.

==== Expanding development and Brunswick Smart Growth ====
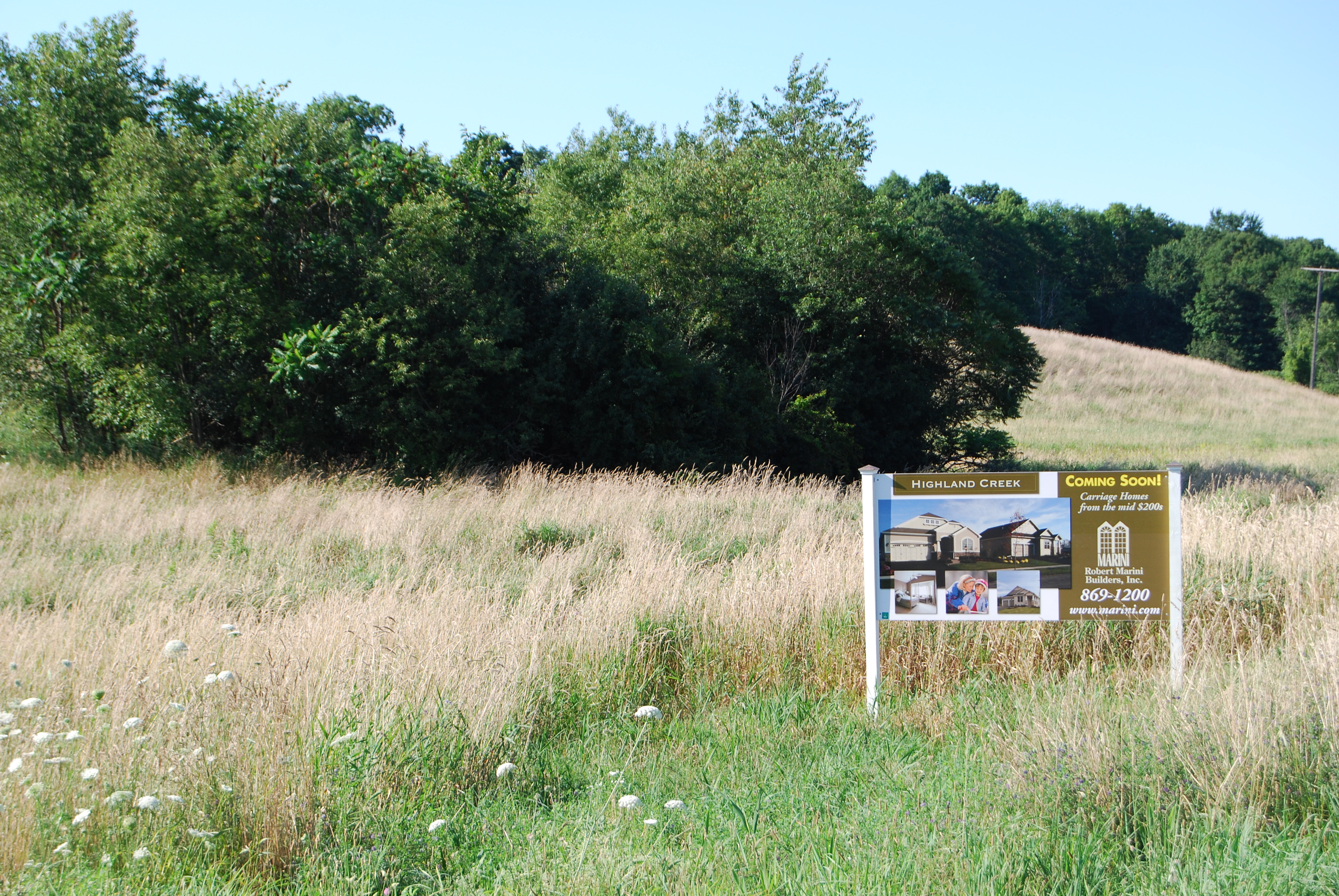
Proposed development of Highland Creek, on McChesney Avenue Extension, one of a number of proposed developments to raise concern in the town

Lawn signs used to promote Brunswick Smart Growth

In early 2005, Wal-Mart indicated intentions to build a Supercenter near its current site on Hoosick Road (Route 7), which sparked outcry from a significant portion of the town population. Additionally, in late 2006, the town saw proposals for five large housing developments that would have added 1387 new homes to a town that was only seeing an average of 43 new homes per year. These proposals, along with other development plans, brought about much opposition, mainly from an organization called Brunswick Smart Growth, Inc., which began a campaign against rapid and excessive development.

One of the main issues coming from Brunswick Smart Growth and town residents was concerns regarding overdevelopment of the town in a short period of time; their argument was for "sustainable and positive growth". Many cited the arguable overdevelopment of Clifton Park, a town located roughly 14 miles (23 km) to the northwest. Brunswick Smart Growth became noticeable after many residents placed signs on their lawns.

All of these proposed developments were planned to be rezoned to waive the usual requirement that each house sit on at least 1 acre (0.40 ha) of land. Additionally, some town residents were upset about the fact that one of the developments, Highland Creek, was made possible by the sale of 210.3 acres (85.1 ha) of land by town supervisor Philip Herrington and his brother Kenneth, a Rensselaer County legislator. It is notable that the Herrington brothers are successful dairy farmers; they own the largest dairy farm in Rensselaer County, and they also own a significant amount of farmland in the town. The land of the proposed Highland Creek development sits on former farmland.

The issue went so far as two lawsuits against the town. The first was brought about in October 2006 by Brunswick Smart Growth and a few individual town residents. It claimed that one, the town did not offer enough hearings regarding the planned Highland Creek development, and two, that the land on which Highland Creek would be built had not been properly rezoned for the development (it was zoned for agriculture and never rezoned to allow a residential development). The suit was eventually dismissed by Rensselaer County Supreme Court Judge Christian F. Hummel.

A second suit was filed, this time in the State Supreme Court, in November 2007, again by Brunswick Smart Growth and a few individuals. This time, the suit focused on insufficiencies in the town's comprehensive plan. If the comprehensive plan were deemed inadequate, two proposed developments that had already received approval would lose their approval. This suit was dismissed in August 2009. The town reportedly spent more than $38,000 in legal fees during the two lawsuits.

The planned Wal-mart Supercenter was scrapped in 2007, instead the current Wal-mart received an upgrade; and none of the planned developments have yet been built, though this could have much to do with the late-2000s recession.

== Geography ==
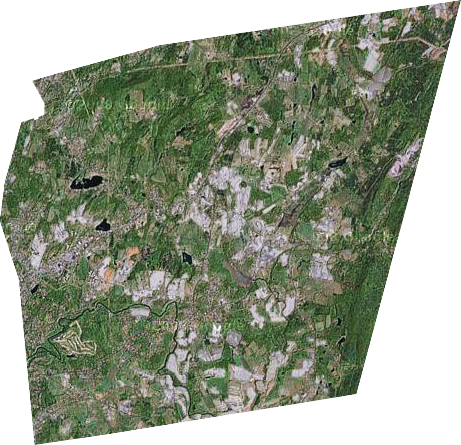
Satellite photo of Brunswick

The town has gently rolling hills, which rise to the east, and some ridges of the Petersburg range are visible to the east. The most conspicuous height in Brunswick is Bald Mountain, also called Mount Rafinesque, which has a commanding view down the Hudson Valley. Bald Mountain also has television and radio broadcast towers.

The Poesten Kill winds across Brunswick, and empties into the Hudson in Troy. Its descent in Troy was the site of important water power.

According to the United States Census Bureau, the town has a total area of 44.6 square miles (116 km^{2}), of which 44.5 square miles (115 km^{2}) is land and 0.1 square miles (0.26 km^{2}) (0.25%) is water.

=== Communities ===
Brunswick has a number of unincorporated villages or hamlets in the town.

- Center Brunswick was a point of early settlement and is a little north of the center of the town. It was located upon the well-known Hoosick Road (today, New York State Route 7). Although called Center Brunswick by inhabitants, the New York State highway department has always insisted that the proper name is Brunswick Center, and that inverted name has also followed into the databases of the digital age.
- Haynersville is situated in the north part of the town. It is adjacent to the old Cooksborough neighborhood in Pittstown and was the post office for that area in 1880. It derives its name from the Hayner families, who operated a tavern there after the French and Indian War. It is also located on the Hoosick Road and was a stopping point for stages that formed an important line between Troy and Bennington. It also is sometimes listed as Haynerville.
- Tamarac, or Tamarack, also known as Platestown, was near a point of quite early business, but much of this died by 1880. It is on a route of considerable former travel from Eagle Mills to Boyntonville, in Pittstown.
- Eagle Mills, in 1880, was the largest and most important business place in the town of Brunswick. In the mid to late 19th century, it was also known as Millville due to its mill work along the Poestenkill Creek. It is located along the former Mud Turnpike, much of which is the present New York State Route 2 to Grafton and Williamstown. Water power from the Postenkill was an important source of power for the mills. Hosting this type of industry led to other businesses opening up as well, such as a hotel, a foundry, blacksmiths, shoe shops, a wagon shop, and a vinegar establishment just east of the center of the hamlet. Those have all passed, and now Eagle Mills is mostly a residential community.
- Cropseyville is located along present day Route 2 near its intersection with New York State Route 351. It was known for its businesses relating to wagons, including a wagon shop and a blacksmith. It has its own post office. Cropseyville once depended on water power from the nearby Quackenkill Creek.
- East Brunswick, also known as Rock Hollow, is located above Cropseyville, on the old Troy and Williamstown Turnpike. It too depended on the Quackenkill for water power. Its most important business was the Lawton twine factory, which was long closed by 1880.
- Clum's Corners was a well-known point of early times. It was on the road from Eagle Mills northeast to Boyntonville in Pittstown. The area is named for O. Clum, a blacksmith in the area. The area was known for wagon work, hosting a wagon shop, blacksmith, and hotel. It was known for fertile flats and fine farming. It is now the site of the regional high school, and has some expanding development and is becoming a retail center.

=== Landmarks ===
The town contains three listings on the National Register of Historic Places, two are schoolhouses and one farmstead: Garfield School; the Little Red Schoolhouse; and the Marsh–Link–Pollock Farm. In addition, it is home to a well-known cemetery, Forest Park Cemetery, currently under the jurisdiction of the town. It is known by urban legend as being one of the most haunted cemeteries in the United States. A very small portion of the historic Oakwood Cemetery, added to the National Register of Historic Places in 1984, and burial place of Samuel Wilson, a possible namesake of Uncle Sam, resides within the northwestern part of the town.

== Demographics ==
Brunswick Historical Populations
Year	Pop.	±%
1810	2,302	—
1820	2,318	+0.7%
1830	2,575	+11.1%
1840	3,051	+18.5%
1850	3,146	+3.1%
1860	3,110	−1.1%
1870	3,128	+0.6%
1880	3,404	+8.8%
1890	3,054	−10.3%
1900	3,513	+15.0%
1910	2,832	−19.4%
1920	2,812	−0.7%
1930	3,949	+40.4%
1940	4,917	+24.5%
1950	5,967	+21.4%
1960	9,004	+50.9%
1970	11,193	+24.3%
1980	10,974	−2.0%
1990	11,093	+1.1%
2000	11,664	+5.1%
2010	11,941	+2.4%
2020	12,581	+5.4%
Note: Brunswick was incorporated in 1807, therefore the censuses from 1790 and 1800 are not applicable to the town boundaries, which did not exist. Sources: Censuses 1800–1880; 1890 and 1900; 1910 and 1920; 1930, 1940, and 1950; 1960, 1970, and 1980; and 1990, 2000, and 2008. Source: U.S. Decennial Census

As of the 2000 census, there were 11,664 people, 4,613 households, and 3,266 families residing in the town. The population density was 261.9 inhabitants per square mile (101.1/km^{2}). There were 4,808 housing units at an average density of 108.0 per square mile (41.7/km^{2}). The racial makeup of the town was 96.38% White, 0.90% African American, 0.06% Native American, 1.60% Asian, 0.02% Pacific Islander, 0.31% from other races, and 0.73% from two or more races. Hispanic or Latino of any race were 0.80% of the population.

There were 4,613 households, out of which 31.5% had children under the age of 18 living with them, 58.9% were married couples living together, 8.2% had a female householder with no husband present, and 29.2% were non-families. 23.9% of all households were made up of individuals, and 10.1% had someone living alone who was 65 years of age or older. The average household size was 2.52 and the average family size was 3.01.

In the town, the population was spread out, with 23.5% under the age of 18, 6.6% from 18 to 24, 28.5% from 25 to 44, 26.2% from 45 to 64, and 15.2% who were 65 years of age or older. The median age was 40 years. For every 100 females, there were 96.3 males. For every 100 females age 18 and over, there were 93.4 males.

The median income for a household in the town was $56,528, and the median income for a family was $66,374. Males had a median income of $43,093 versus $31,995 for females. The per capita income for the town was $26,554. About 3.1% of families and 3.2% of the population were below the poverty line, including 1.4% of those under age 18 and 2.5% of those age 65 or over.

== Government ==
=== Local government ===
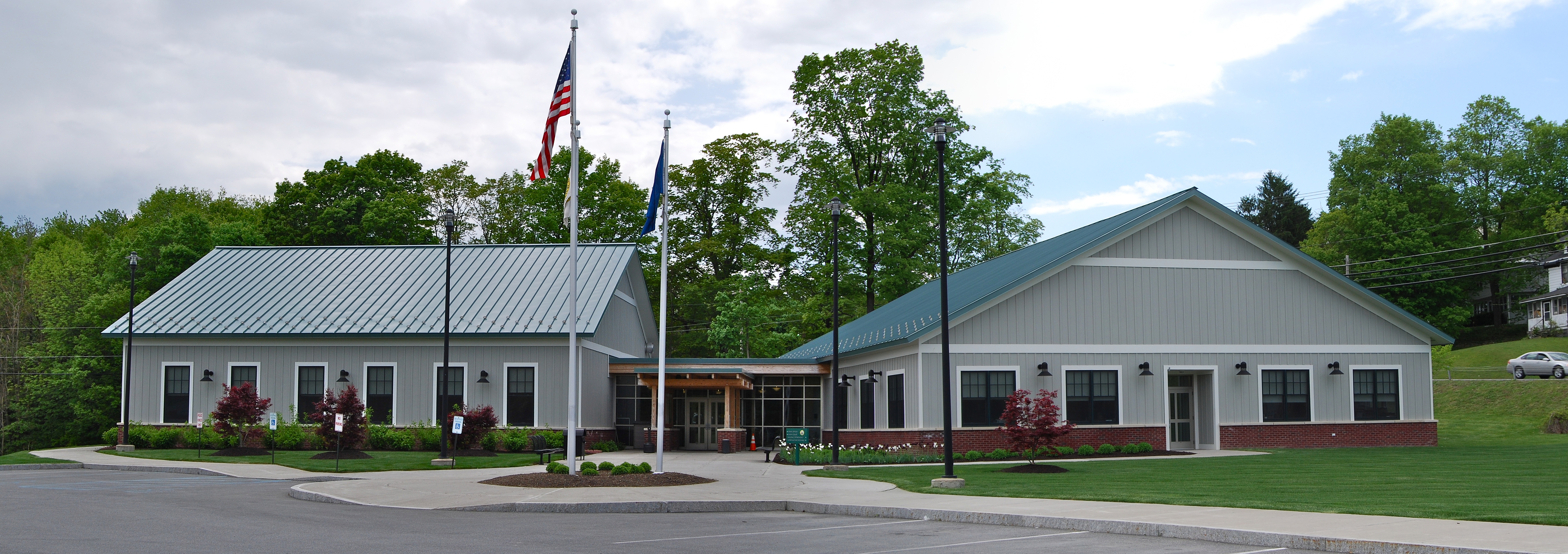
Brunswick Town Hall

Like all towns of the first class (Note: The New York State Department of State states that "[a]ll towns of 10,000 or over in population as shown by the latest federal decennial census…are by statute towns of the first class.") in New York, Brunswick has an elected town supervisor, town board, two town justices, town clerk and receiver of taxes. Unlike most towns, Brunswick's highway superintendent has been made an appointed position. The current supervisor is Philip H. Herrington (R), who was elected to the position in 1997. The town board is made up of four members, each serving four-year terms, with two seats up for election every odd year. The current members are Mark J. Balistreri (R), Gordon Christian (R), James Sullivan (R), and Mark Cipperly (C). The first two members sit in seats that are up for election in November 2025; the latter are up for election in November 2027. The current town justices are Gary Gordon (D) and Terrance Buchanan (R). The town clerk is position is vacant. The entirety of town government is housed in Brunswick Town Hall, on the corner of Town Office Road and Hoosick Road. (Note: 42°45′23.7″N 73°36′38.78″W)

=== Federal, state and county representation ===
Being in the state of New York, Brunswick is represented in the United States Senate by Chuck Schumer (D) and Kirsten Gillibrand (D). Brunswick is located in New York's 19th congressional district, which is currently represented by Antonio Delgado. The town resides in the 43rd State Senate district, represented by Daphne Jordan (R), and the 107th Assembly district, represented by Jake Ashby (R). For Rensselaer County, the county executive is Steven F. McLaughlin (R). With respect to the County Legislature, the town is in district 3 and is represented by Kenneth Herrington (R), Todd J. Tesman (R), and Dan Casale (R).

== Politics ==
Brunswick has both an organized Democratic Committee and Republican Committee. The legislative branch of Brunswick government has been under Republican control since the late 1990s. Republicans have a comfortable majority in the town: as of April 1, 2009, there were 2670 registered Republicans and 2230 registered Democrats residing in the town. Third parties are also represented, though with low populations relative to the main two parties. The third parties represented include the Independence Party, Conservative Party, Working Families Party, Green Party, and Libertarian Party; the Independence Party significantly outnumbers any other third party.

== Services ==
The town is served by five volunteer fire departments: Eagle Mills Fire Department on Brunswick Road in Eagle Mills, Center Brunswick Fire Company on Hoosick Road in Center Brunswick, Brunswick Fire Company, No. 1 on Hoosick Road in Sycaway, Mountain View Fire Company near Wynantskill, and Speigletown Fire Company in Speigletown. Brunswick is also the home to a Troop G station of the New York State Police. Additionally, a sub-residency of the New York State Department of Transportation is located on Brick Church Road.

Municipal water service comes from Troy, though a significant portion of the town's population gets its water from wells. Similarly, the small portion of the population connected to the local sewer system is serviced by the Rensselaer County Sewer District, though most inhabitants have individual septic systems.

== Culture and recreation ==
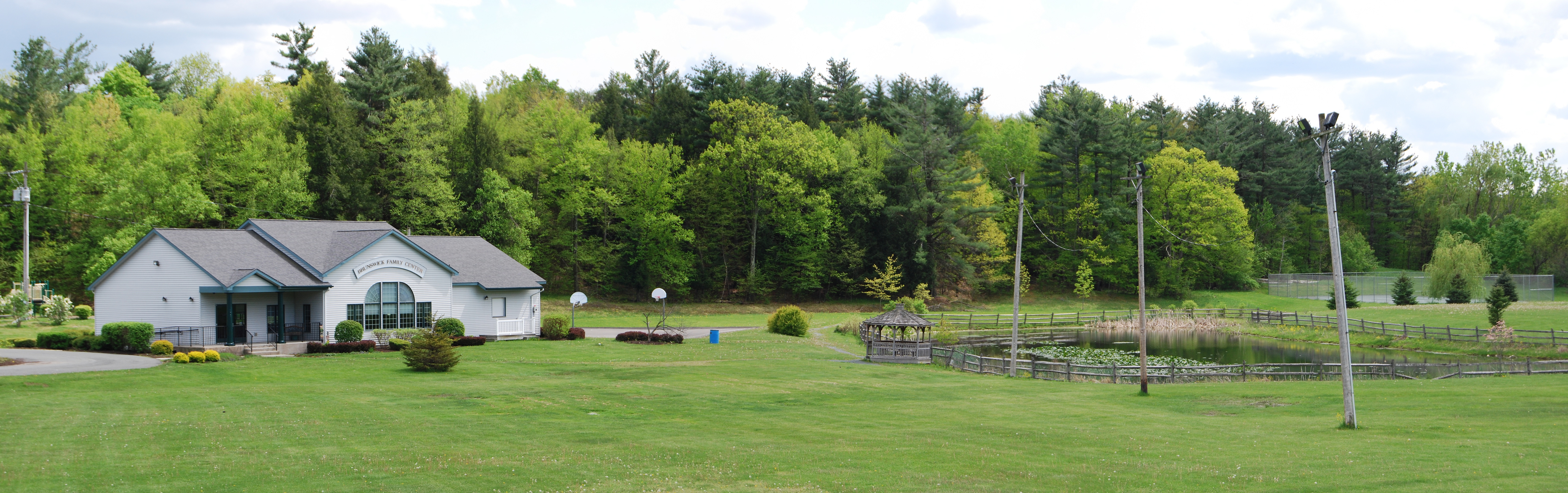
Brunswick Community Center

Brunswick offers a selection of recreation areas for residents and non-residents. Brunswick Town Beach and Park, formerly the Vanderheyden and Brunswick reservoirs, on North Lake Avenue, was bought and developed by the town in 1967 and opened in 1968. Access is free to town residents. The town also hosts a free concert series on Tuesday nights during the summer, located on the lawn of the Brunswick Community Center. Additionally, the Community Center, built on the foundation of the former Lee School, offers tennis courts, a basketball court, a playground, and rental space for special events hosted by town residents.

The town is home to three golf courses: one private, two public. The Country Club of Troy, despite its name, resides completely in Brunswick, near its western border with Troy. Its 18-hole golf course, designed by Walter J. Travis (his last before he died), opened in 1926. The country club is private. Brunswick Greens, located on Hoosick Road, offers a nine-hole course. Additionally, parts of the Frear Park Municipal Golf Course reside in Brunswick, though most of the course is within Troy city limits, and its organization is overseen by the city. Opened in 1931 as a nine-hole course, Frear was expanded to 18 holes in 1964. Frear was designated the Upper Valley winner for best golf course by Hudson Valley magazine in 2003.

== Transportation ==
The two major thoroughfares in Brunswick are New York Route 2 and New York Route 7, known locally as Brunswick Road and Hoosick Road, respectively. On the west, both originate in Troy, then pass through the town, and continue into neighboring towns on the east: Hoosick Road enters Pittstown and continues into Vermont and Brunswick Road enters Grafton and continues into Massachusetts. New York Route 278, Brick Church Road, connects Routes 2 and 7 near the center of the town. New York Route 142, Grange Road, connects Brunswick with Lansingburgh and New York Route 351, Farm to Market Road, connects Brunswick with Poestenkill. Going west, Route 7 becomes Hoosick Street in Troy and eventually becomes a four-lane highway on the Collar City Bridge, intersecting Interstate 787 and ending with a merge onto Interstate 87, giving Brunswick easy access to the local highway system, and subsequently the greater Capital District.

The closest airport is Rensselaer County Airport in Poestenkill, though it is only for small, private planes. The closest commercial airport is Albany International Airport in Colonie. Bus service is not common outside the very western end of the town, which is essentially an extension of the city of Troy. CDTA's bus 87 stops at Wal-Mart on Hoosick Road, which is the only scheduled stop within Brunswick.

== Education ==
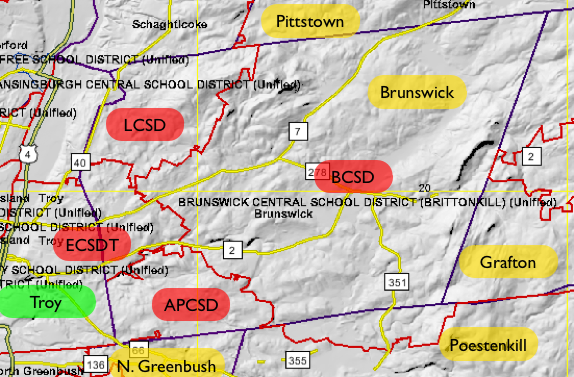
Brunswick is part of five school districts: Averill Park, Brittonkill, Lansingburgh, Troy, and Wynantskill

Most of the town sits within the boundaries of Brunswick (Brittonkill) Central School District, whose main campus is at Clums Corners. Additionally, Averill Park Central School District, the Enlarged City School District of Troy, Lansingburgh Central School District, and a very small portion Wynantskill Union Free School District are also within the town.

Active public school buildings within the town are Tamarac Secondary School and Tamarac Elementary School on Brunswick Road (Brittonkill). George Washington Elementary School on Menemsha Lane (Averill Park) is scheduled to close at the end of the 2009-2010 school year.

With the help of local BOCES, public high school students have the opportunity to attend vo-tech programs, higher-level learning programs, and Tech Valley High School.

The Capital District is known for its many places of higher leaning, giving residents the opportunity to receive a higher level degree after high school. Hudson Valley Community College and the University at Albany are two of the more popular local colleges to attend. Also available are The College of Saint Rose in Albany, Rensselaer Polytechnic Institute and Russell Sage College in Troy, and Union College in Schenectady, just to name a few.

== Sports ==
Brunswick contributed to the rising popularity of auto racing after World War II when a 1/5-mile (0.32 km) dirt oval facility was opened by Bernie Carroll Jr. in 1950 near the hamlet of Cropseyville. In deference to an ongoing controversy over the New York State Blue laws, the facility did not operate in 1951, then permanently suspended operations due to track conditions after a partial season in 1952. Along with the Pine Bowl and Route 66 Speedways in the adjoining town of Poestenkill and Burden Lake Speedway in the nearby town of Sand Lake, Rensselaer County became a hub for the sport. Pine Bowl was the longest-lasting of the county’s four tracks, operating through 1966. (Note: Geolocation of Carroll’s Grove Speedway: 42.7707°N 73.5877°W)

== Bibliography ==
- Sylvester, Nathaniel Bartlett (1880). History of Rensselaer Co., New York with Illustrations and Biographical Sketches of its Prominent Men and Pioneers. Philadelphia: Everts & Peck. OCLC 3496287.
- Barnett, J. N. (1881). History of Gilead Evangelical Lutheran Church, Centre Brunswick, Rensselaer Co., N. Y., and its vicinity. Fort Wayne, Indiana: Gazette Co.
- "Local Government Handbook" (PDF) (5th ed.). New York State Department of State. 2008. Archived from the original (PDF) on March 26, 2009.
