= Thayer, Nebraska =

Village in York County, Nebraska, United States

- Village
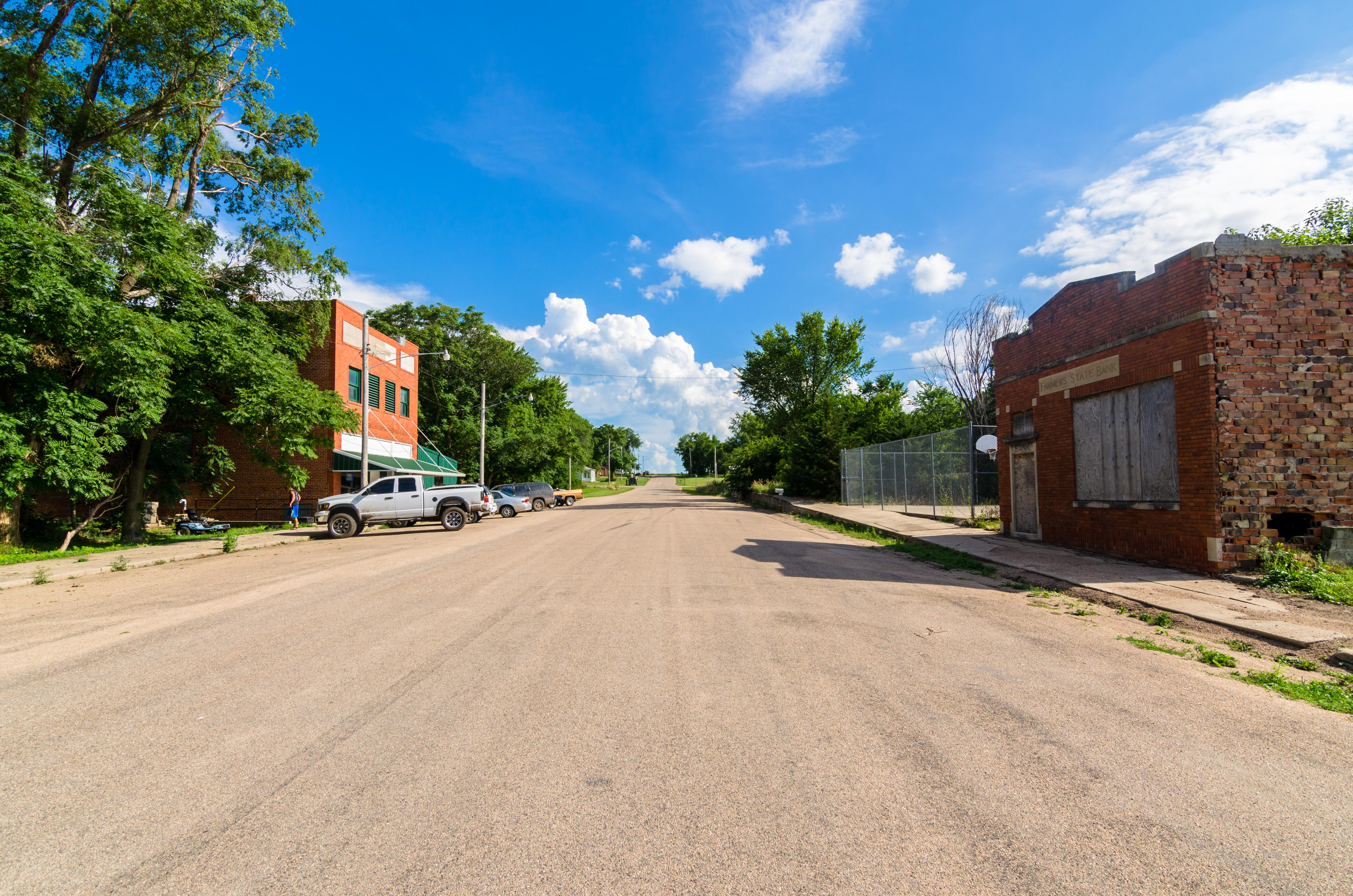
- Cedar Street in Thayer, July 2017

- Location of Thayer, Nebraska
- Coordinates: 40°58′12″N 97°29′48″W
- Country: United States
- State: Nebraska
- County: York

Area
  - Total: 0.27 sq mi (0.71 km^{2})
  - Land: 0.27 sq mi (0.71 km^{2})
  - Water: 0 sq mi (0.00 km^{2})
- Elevation: 1,581 ft (482 m)

Population (2020)
  - Total: 44
  - Density: 160.9/sq mi (62.12/km^{2})
- Time zone: UTC-6 (Central (CST))
  - Summer (DST): UTC-5 (CDT)
- ZIP code: 68460
- Area code: 402
- FIPS code: 31-48690
- GNIS feature ID: 2399965

Thayer is a village in York County, Nebraska, United States. As of the 2020 census, Thayer had a population of 44.

== History ==
Thayer was platted in 1887 when the railroad was extended to that point. It was named for John Milton Thayer, a general in the Union Army during the Civil War and a Reconstruction era United States Senator from Nebraska.

== Geography ==
According to the United States Census Bureau, the village has a total area of 0.29 square miles (0.75 km^{2}), all land.

== Demographics ==
Historical population
Census	Pop.	Note	%±
1920	168		—
1930	192		14.3%
1940	135		−29.7%
1950	90		−33.3%
1960	78		−13.3%
1970	78		0.0%
1980	70		−10.3%
1990	64		−8.6%
2000	71		10.9%
2010	62		−12.7%
2020	44		−29.0%
U.S. Decennial Census

=== 2010 census ===
As of the census of 2010, there were 62 people, 28 households, and 20 families residing in the village. The population density was 213.8 inhabitants per square mile (82.5/km^{2}). There were 30 housing units at an average density of 103.4 per square mile (39.9/km^{2}). The racial makeup of the village was 100.0% White.

There were 28 households, of which 17.9% had children under the age of 18 living with them, 64.3% were married couples living together, 3.6% had a female householder with no husband present, 3.6% had a male householder with no wife present, and 28.6% were non-families. 21.4% of all households were made up of individuals, and 3.6% had someone living alone who was 65 years of age or older. The average household size was 2.21 and the average family size was 2.55.

The median age in the village was 50.8 years. 19.4% of residents were under the age of 18; 3.2% were between the ages of 18 and 24; 14.4% were from 25 to 44; 51.7% were from 45 to 64; and 11.3% were 65 years of age or older. The gender makeup of the village was 51.6% male and 48.4% female.

=== 2000 census ===
As of the census of 2000, there were 71 people, 26 households, and 19 families residing in the village. The population density was 235.9 inhabitants per square mile (91.1/km^{2}). There were 30 housing units at an average density of 99.7 per square mile (38.5/km^{2}). The racial makeup of the village was 100.00% White.

There were 26 households, out of which 30.8% had children under the age of 18 living with them, 69.2% were married couples living together, 3.8% had a female householder with no husband present, and 23.1% were non-families. 15.4% of all households were made up of individuals, and 11.5% had someone living alone who was 65 years of age or older. The average household size was 2.73 and the average family size was 3.10.

In the village, the population was spread out, with 31.0% under the age of 18, 4.2% from 18 to 24, 23.9% from 25 to 44, 32.4% from 45 to 64, and 8.5% who were 65 years of age or older. The median age was 41 years. For every 100 females, there were 91.9 males. For every 100 females age 18 and over, there were 104.2 males.

As of 2000 the median income for a household in the village was $50,313, and the median income for a family was $48,438. Males had a median income of $26,875 versus $25,625 for females. The per capita income for the village was $18,164. There were 10.5% of families and 22.0% of the population living below the poverty line, including 42.1% of under eighteens and none of those over 64.

== See also ==
- List of villages in Nebraska
