= Cully, Portland, Oregon =

Neighborhood of Portland, Oregon

Cully
- Neighborhood
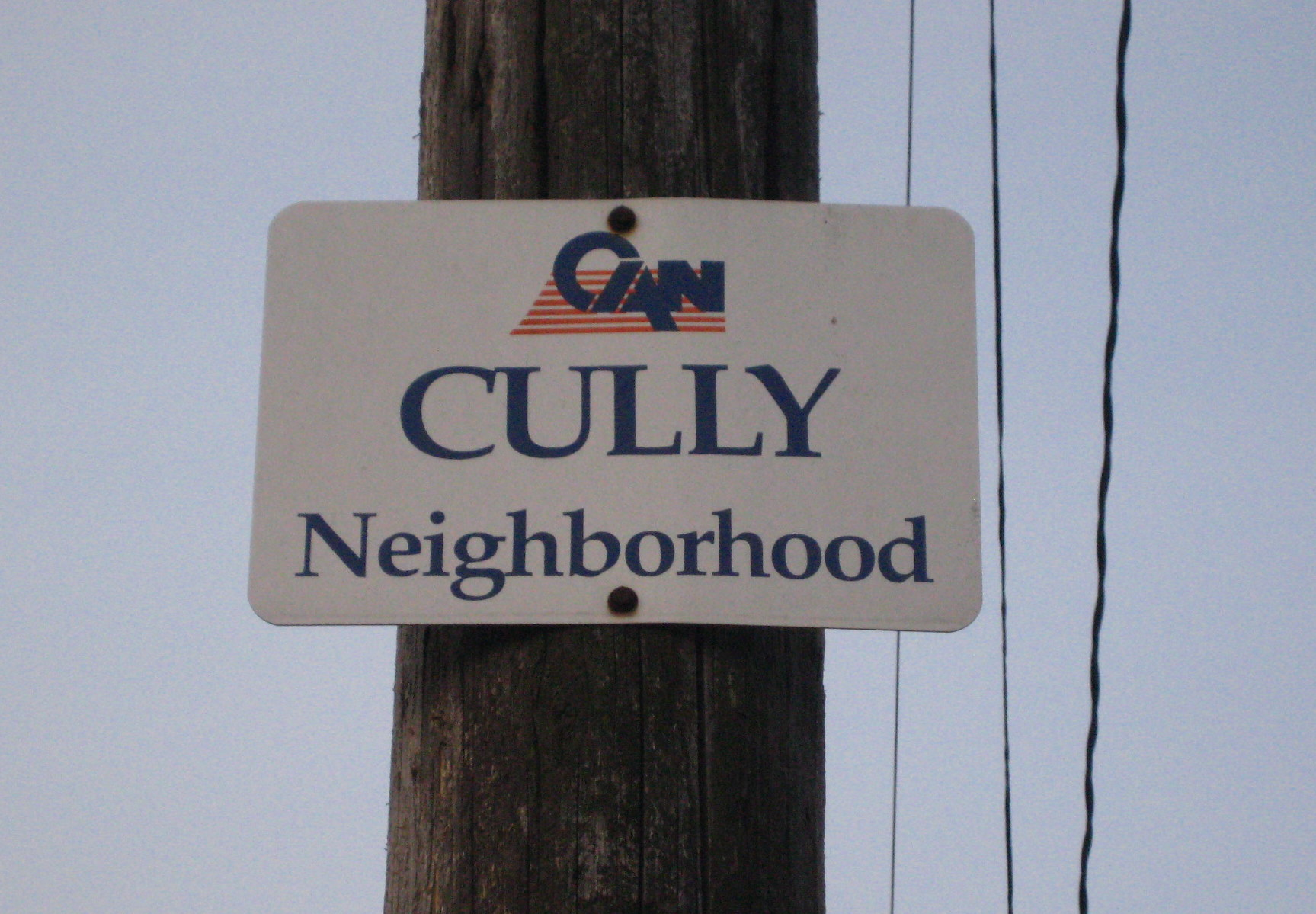
- Interactive map of Cully
- Coordinates: 45°33′41″N 122°35′44″W
- Country: United States
- State: Oregon
- City: Portland

Government
  - Association: Cully Association of Neighbors
  - Coalition: Central Northeast Neighbors, Inc.

Area
  - Total: 3.14 sq mi (8.1 km^{2})

Population (2020)
  - Total: 13,339
  - Density: 4,248/sq mi (1,640/km^{2})

Housing
  - No. of households: 5290
  - Occupancy rate: 95.1% occupied
  - Owner-occupied: 2846 households (61%)
  - Renting: 1839 households (39%)
  - Avg. household size: 2.5 persons

Cully is a neighborhood in the Northeast section of Portland, Oregon and a former census-designated place (CDP). The neighborhood, as well as NE Cully Blvd. that runs diagonally through it, is named after English stonemason Thomas Cully (1810–1891), an early settler. Cully borders Sunderland, Concordia, and Beaumont-Wilshire on the west, Portland International Airport on the north, Sumner on the east, and Rose City Park and Roseway on the south.

Neighborhood parks include Sacajawea Park (1985), Rigler Community Garden (2004), Kʰunamokwst Park (2015), and Whitaker Ponds Nature Park (1998). Nevertheless, Cully has the smallest amount of parkland per capita, and largest population living more than one-half mile from a park, of any Portland neighborhood. The Thomas Cully Park Community Garden celebrated its grand opening on October 18, 2012.

Rose City Cemetery, founded in 1906, occupies the southwest corner of the neighborhood. Within its grounds is the Japanese Cemetery, which is maintained independently by the Japanese Ancestral Society of Portland.

== Demographics ==
In 2020, 13,339 people lived in Cully, up 1% from 13,240 in 2010. 58% of people identified as white, 12.1% as Black or African American, 6.4% as Asian, 4.9% as American Indian or Alaska Native, 0.9% as Native Hawaiian or Pacific Islander, and 18.2% as some other race. 23.5% identified as Hispanic or Latino (any race). The median age in Cully was 37.9. The median household income was listed at $71,000 and 19% of the neighborhood was covered by tree canopy. 67% of eligible residents voted in the 2020 general election.

== See also ==
- Neerchokikoo
