= Bronco Charlie Miller =

American horse tamer & Pony Express rider (1850-1955)

Miller from a 1935 book about his life

Julius Mortimer "Bronc(h)o Charlie" Miller (December 1850 – 15 January 1955) was an American horse tamer and Pony Express rider. He was born on the trail in California to parents travelling west for the California Gold Rush. At the age of 11 Miller claimed to have become the youngest ever Pony Express rider, claiming to have done so after witnessing a horse arrive without its rider at the station in Sacramento. Miller then worked as a horse trainer, from which he earnt his nickname, including a period working on Teddy Roosevelt's cattle ranch. Afterwards he became a performer demonstrating roping techniques, horse riding and knife throwing. On his travels he met and married Carrie Potter, who joined and became a target girl in his act.

Miller was known as a teller of "tall tales", though many of them were true. He stated that he joined the Canadian Army and fought in the First World War and also volunteered to serve in the Korean War. Miller claimed an acquaintance with many Old West figures including Bill Hickok, Jim Bridger, Calamity Jane, George Custer, the Marquis de Morès and Sitting Bull.

== Early life and Pony Express ==
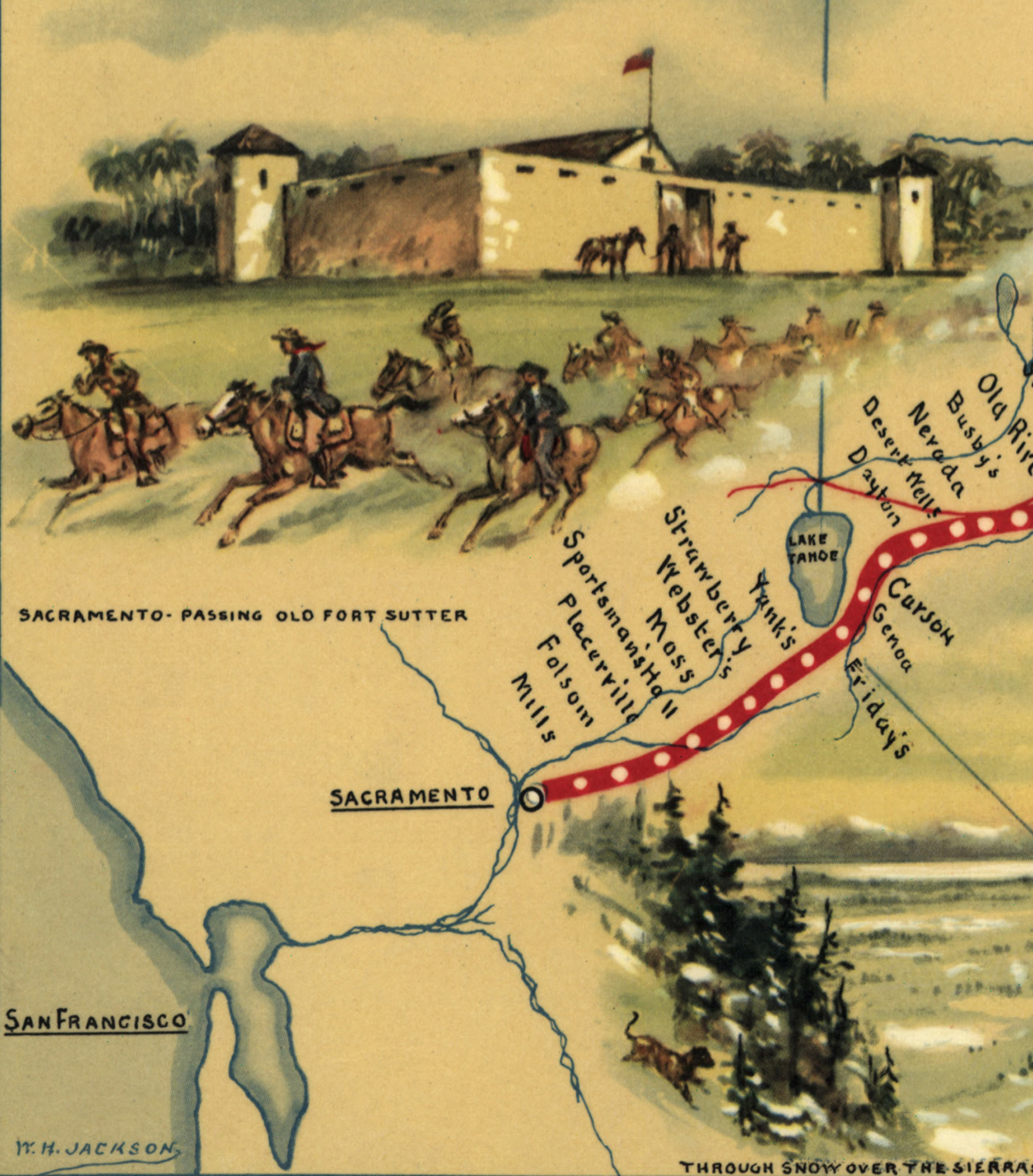
Western portion of Pony Express route, including Sacramento, Placerville and Carson City

Julius Mortimer Miller was born ("between two buffalo robes") in a covered wagon at Shasta, California. His parents (a tailor and school teacher) had been travelling as part of a 300-vehicle wagon train headed for Sutter's Fort as part of the California Gold Rush. Some of Miller's descendants claim that he was born in New York and had sailed to California as a deckhand on a ship.

At the age of 11 Miller claimed to have ridden part of the route of the Pony Express carrying its mail, becoming the youngest rider to do so. Miller claimed that in July 1861 he was outside the Pony Express station in Sacramento when a horse arrived without its rider. He was told that the rider was likely killed in a Native American attack and Miller begged for the opportunity to replace him, explaining that he was familiar with the route to the next station, Placerville. Miller stated that this request was granted and that after successfully delivering the mail he was appointed by the Express to carry the mail between Carson City and Placerville until the service ended in October. Miller claimed that during his service he survived two arrow wounds.

Miller's account has some doubtful elements. History writer Tim McNeese, in The Pony Express (2009), notes that any pony arriving at Sacramento and bound for Placerville can only have come from the west, either from Benicia or via steam boat from San Francisco, and that neither route was at significant risk of attack. He states that it was also unlikely that the home station at Sacramento had no spare riders. McNeese also considers it unlikely that Miller's destination would be the "swing" station at Placerville, where typically only spare horses would have been held, with the next home station being Sportsman's Hall. McNeese further considers it unlikely that Miller was appointed as a permanent rider on the Carson City to Placerville route which was more than 100 miles of difficult country. McNeese states that Miller might possibly have served as a short-term replacement.

It was not uncommon for men to falsely claim to have been Pony Express riders. Though young men were preferred by the Express and other appointments included 14-year-olds Billy Tate and the future showman Buffalo Bill.

== Horse training and Wild West shows ==
For the 20 years following his involvement with the Pony Express Miller worked breaking-in horses (he derived his nickname from the term used for a bucking horse) and ran a riding stables. He afterwards moved to the Eastern United States where he met future president Teddy Roosevelt, working as a horse trainer on his Dakota cattle ranch. Roosevelt claimed to have taught Miller how to break-in a horse. In later life Miller joined Roosevelt's Bull Moose Party. In a memoir published in 1934 Miller claimed to have carried dispatches in the 1877 Nez Perce War and to have driven a stage coach in Montana. He claimed to have known the Old West figures Bill Hickok, Jim Bridger, Calamity Jane and George Custer and to have worked for the French rancher the Marquis de Morès.

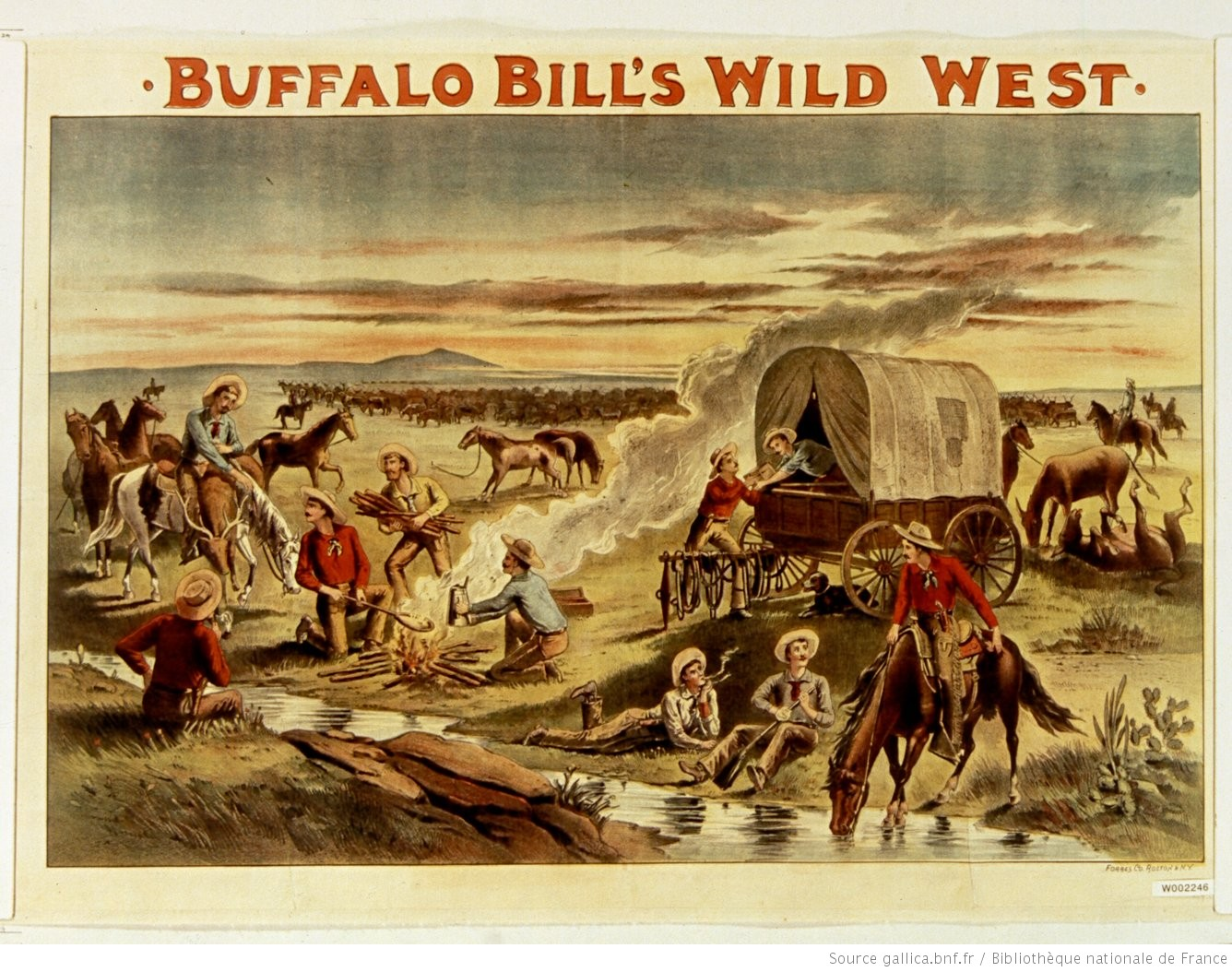
An 1884 poster for Buffalo Bill's Wild West

Miller later became a showman, playing the role of cowboy, riding horses and demonstrating roping techniques. He performed in Buffalo Bill's Wild West show including in a performance for the 1887 Golden Jubilee of Queen Victoria. Whilst touring with the show in Glen Falls, New York, he met 20-year-old Carrie Potter and the pair started dating. Carrie's parents disapproved of the relationship but the couple soon married, with Carrie stating that she was 27 years old on the marriage certificate (Miller was 40 at this point). Carrie joined Miller on tour and became part of his show, as a target girl for his knife throwing segment.

By 1890 Miller had left Buffalo Bill's show and was touring independently or with Mexican Joe's show. Carrie continued to follow Miller on tour, giving birth to three children. The children contracted diphtheria and all died within the same week in 1896. Carrie blamed the constant travel involved with the showman's life for their children's deaths, and when she became pregnant again in 1898, returned to Glen Falls. Miller continued as a travelling showman, though returning regularly to Glen Falls. The couple had another child, a daughter, in 1903. Whilst travelling, Miller joined the Salvation Army after entering one of their meetings looking for food and company. He later claimed to have become known as the "Converted Cowboy" for his role preaching for the Salvation Army. Miller later established a horse riding stable at Glens Falls, but continued to travel as a speaker and performer.

Miller became known as a teller of "tall tales", though many of them were true. He and cowboy Marve Beardsley rode in a six-day endurance race against two cyclists at the Agricultural Hall in Islington. Some of his tales were embroidered with fiction, including a claim that he took Red Shirt, one of Buffalo Bill's Native American performers, fox hunting in Leicestershire, England, and barely prevented him from roping the fox. Miller also claimed to have known Sitting Bull and to have been the "pet" of Oscar Wilde's cousin Alice Hayes.

== Later life ==
In 1917, during World War I, Miller attempted to enlist in the US Army, at the age of around 67. He was turned down but claimed to have joined the Canadian Army by stating his age as 44. After his return to the United States Miller invested almost all of his savings in US war bonds. He returned to performance, participating in rodeos and in vaudeville over the following 20 years. As an elderly man he performed before audiences of Boy Scouts, demonstrating an ability to light matches, held in the boys' mouths, with a 20 ft-long (6.1 m) bull whip.

In 1927 he constructed a cabin in Oakdale, New York. As the last surviving Pony Express rider he attended a 1935 ceremony in New York to mark the retirement of the last of the United States airmail service's open-cockpit aircraft. Carrie died on 28 March 1936. The next year he gave an interview to the New York Times in which he claimed, at the age of 88, to have never had a hair cut.

In 1942 Miller sold his World War I bonds, for $500,000. Miller built a second cabin in Oakdale in 1946 but sold it two years later. This cabin became the "Bronco Charlie" restaurant, which Miller often patronised. It closed around 1994 and was demolished in 2009. Miller claimed that he had 80 years in the saddle, in one form or another, during his career. In his later years he became a painter and also made wood carvings. Some of his works are held in the collection of the Chapman Museum in Glens Falls. He was still producing complex wood carvings of native Americans, stage coaches and covered wagons with his jackknife past the age of 100. When the Korean War broke out in 1950 Miller again tried to enlist in the American armed forces but was turned down.

Miller was admitted to Bellevue Hospital in New York City in December 1954, suffering from pneumonia. He remained a popular figure and received 20-50 items of fan mail per day whilst in hospital. He died in hospital on 15 January 1955. At the time of his death his son Harold Dewey Miller and daughter Mrs Maurice Spector were both living in Glens Falls. Miller was buried in Glens Falls Cemetery on 19 January.
