= Johndro =

Johndro is a surname. Notable people with the surname include:

- Ellei Johndro (born 1979), American photographer
- Franklin Johndro (1835–1901), Union Army soldier in the American Civil War
- Dr. Charles Johndro (born 1978), Air Force Officer & Physician
