= Wheel of death =

Wheel of death may refer to:

- Wheel of Death (Space Wheel), a large rotating apparatus on which acrobatic and balancing feats are performed
- Wheel of death (impalement arts), a stunt performed by knife throwers
- "Wheel of Death", an episode of Murder, She Wrote
- The Wheel of Death, a 1972 book by Philip Kapleau

== See also ==
- Breaking wheel, a torture and execution device
