= The Unknown (1927 film) =

1927 American film

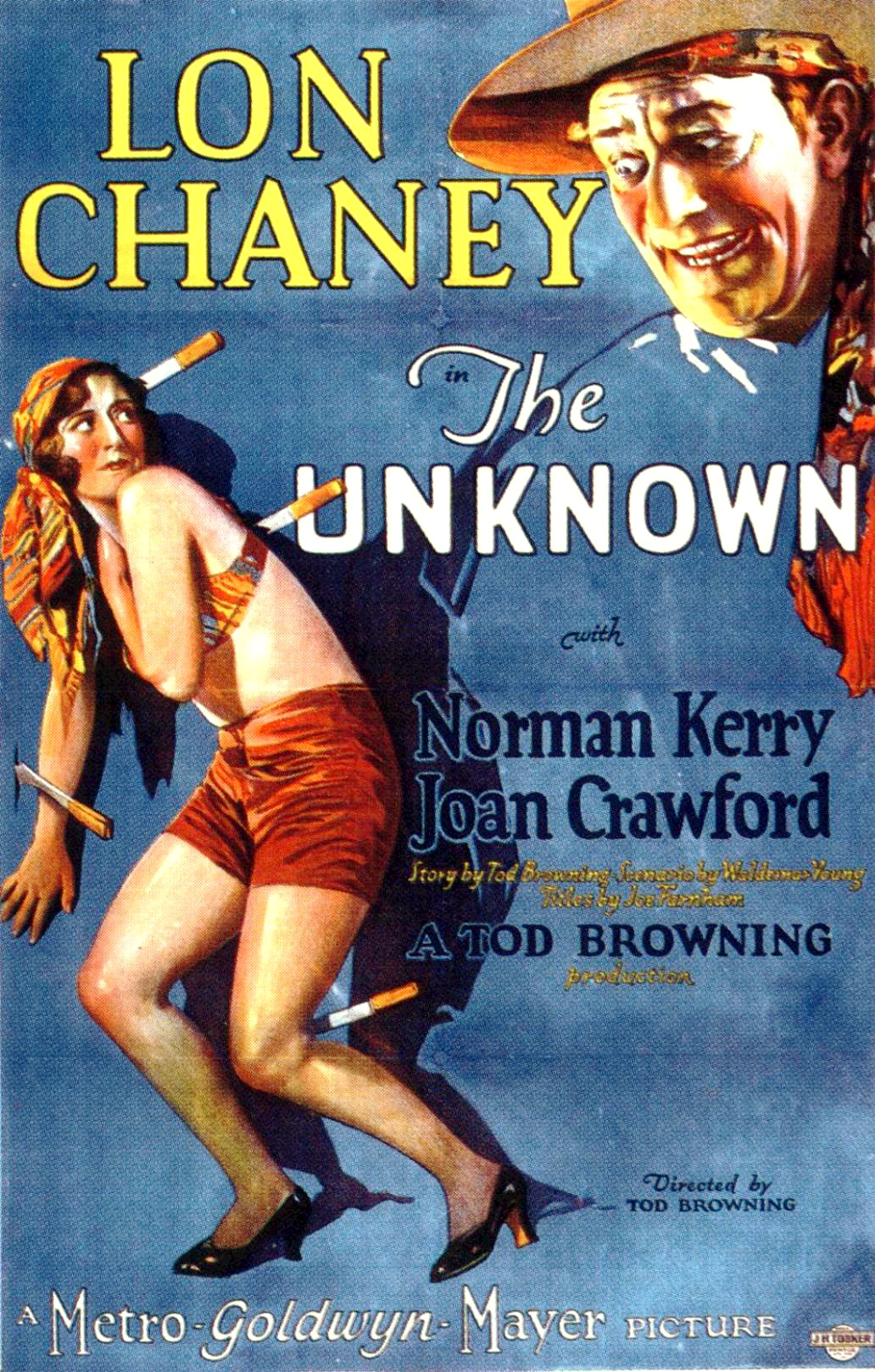
- Directed by: Tod Browning
- Written by: Joseph W. Farnham (titles)
- Screenplay by: Waldemar Young
- Story by: Tod Browning
- Produced by: Irving G. Thalberg
- Starring: Lon Chaney; Norman Kerry; Joan Crawford; Nick De Ruiz; John George
- Cinematography: Merritt B. Gerstad
- Edited by: Harry Reynolds; Errol Taggart
- Distributed by: Metro-Goldwyn-Mayer
- Release date: June 4, 1927
- Running time: 5517 feet (original release); 66 minutes (2022 reconstruction)
- Country: United States
- Languages: Silent film English intertitles
- Budget: $217,000
- Box office: $847,000

The Unknown is a 1927 American silent horror film directed by Tod Browning, and starring Lon Chaney as carnival knife thrower "Alonzo the Armless" and Joan Crawford as his beloved carnival girl Nanon. Originally titled Alonzo the Armless, filming took place from February 7 to March 18, 1927 on a $217,000 budget.

The film carried the tagline: "A superb mystery thriller, unusual and startling even for a Chaney film. Lon as "The Unknown" eats, drinks, shoots a rifle and dresses with his feet. Don't miss this startling spectacle!" Stills exist showing Chaney made up as Alonzo the Armless.

== Plot ==
The Unknown, 2022 George Eastman Museum reconstruction.

"Alonzo the Armless" is a circus freak who uses his feet to toss knives and fire a rifle at Nanon, the daughter of the circus's owner. Alonzo actually has arms, but keeps them tightly strapped to his torso. This secret is known only to his friend Cojo the dwarf. Alonzo's left hand has a double thumb, which would readily identify him as the perpetrator of various crimes.

Alonzo is secretly in love with Nanon. Malabar, the circus strongman, is devoted to her as well, but she has a phobia of men's hands and cannot stand being pawed by them, so she shuns him. She only feels comfortable around the armless Alonzo, because she doesn't feel threatened by him. When she embraces and kisses him one day, he is given hope, but Cojo warns him that he cannot let it happen again. If she holds him too tightly, she might feel his arms.

When Nanon's father, Antonio Zanzi, discovers Alonzo's secret, Alonzo strangles him with his bare hands outside of his circus wagon. Nanon witnesses this through a window, but her view is partially blocked. A flash of lightning reveals that her father's killer has a double thumb on his left hand, but she cannot see the killer's face. Since Alonzo is believed to be armless, he is not a suspect. When the circus leaves town, Alonzo has Nanon remain behind with him.

Cojo points out to Alonzo that if Alonzo and Nanon were to marry, he could not hide his arms from her forever, and she would recognize him as her father's killer because of his double thumb. Consequently, Alonzo blackmails a surgeon into amputating his arms. While he is recovering, however, Malabar's persistent love finally enables Nanon to overcome her phobia of hands, and she agrees to marry him.

When Alonzo (now truly armless) returns to Nanon, she excitedly tells him that she and Malabar are getting married. Alonzo is shocked and horrified, first laughing hysterically, then crying, as he realizes he has cut off his arms for nothing. His emotional outburst confuses the couple, but then Nanon tells Malabar "Look! Alonzo is crying because he is so happy for us."

Alonzo then learns that Malabar and Nanon have been practicing a new act, where the strongman's arms seem to be pulled in opposite directions by two horses who are actually running on hidden treadmills. During the first performance, Alonzo stops one treadmill, hoping the horses will tear the strongman's arms from his body. When Nanon starts to intervene, Alonzo threatens her with a knife, telling her to stay back. However, she rushes to calm one of the horses down. Alonzo tries to save her from injury by pushing her out of the way. The horse knocks Alonzo down and stomps on his chest, killing him. The machine is turned off, and Malabar is saved from mutilation.

== Cast ==
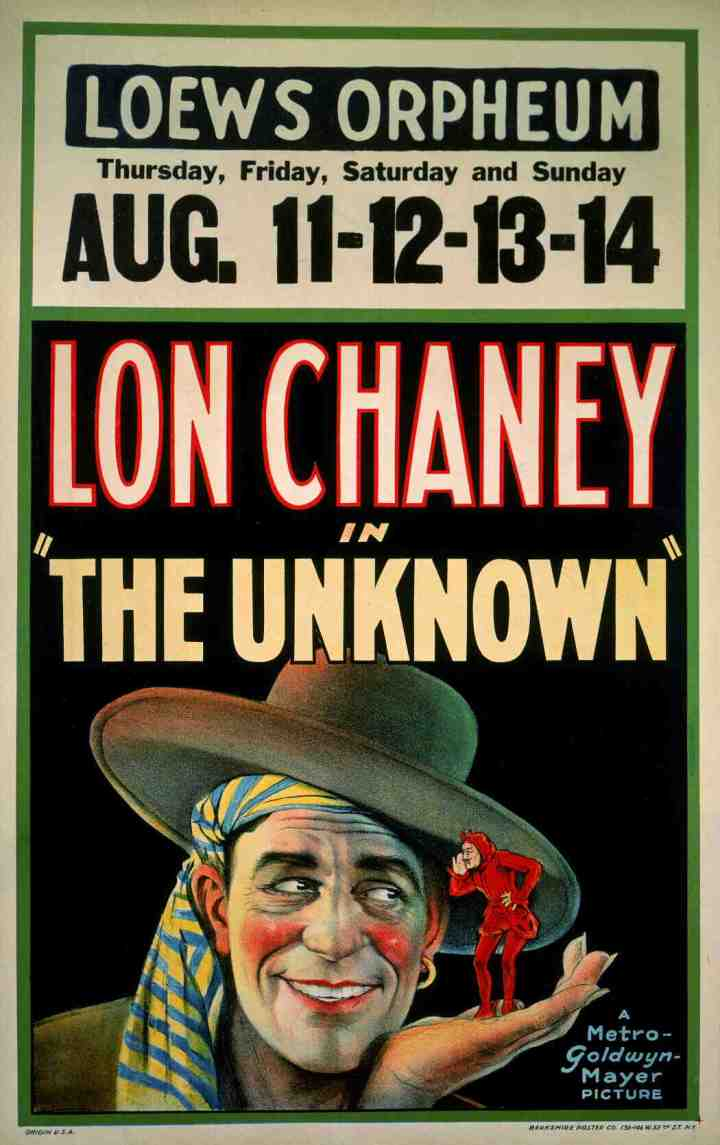
The Unknown (1927) Lobby Poster. Lon Chaney as "Alonzo the Armless" with "Cojo" (John George on palm of hand.)

- Lon Chaney as Alonzo the Armless
- Norman Kerry as Malabar the Mighty
- Joan Crawford as Nanon Zanzi (Estrellita in the original script)
- Nick De Ruiz as Antonio Zanzi (Nanon's father)
- John George as Cojo the dwarf
- Frank Lanning as Costra
- Polly Moran as Landlady (scenes deleted)
- Bobbie Mack as Gypsy (scenes deleted)
- Louise Emmons as Gypsy Woman (uncredited)
- Julian Rivero as Man in Audience (uncredited)
- Billy Seay as The Little Wolf (uncredited)
- John St. Polis (John Sainpolis) as Surgeon (uncredited)
- Italia and Venetia Frandi as undetermined
- Tom Amandares as Gypsy
- Paul Desmuke as Alonzo Body Double (uncredited)

== Production ==
“That The Unknown (1927) was made at MGM borders on the miraculous, but then this was an era of exploratory boundaries, even at the big studios...” Biographer Alfred Eaker in Tod Browning (2016).

The genesis of the story lies in Browning’s reflections on an individual who suffers multiple amputations and the dramatic personal repercussions. Browning describes this process as beginning with the spectacle of traumatic disfigurement, rather than plot:

“The story writes itself after I have conceived the characters. The Unknown came to me after I had the idea of a man [Alonzo] without arms. I then asked myself what are the most amazing situations and actions that a man thus reduced could be involved...”

Actor and collaborator Chaney developed his characterization of Alonzo on the same premise: “I contrived to make myself look like an armless man, not simply to shock and horrify you but merely to bring to the screen a dramatic story of an armless man.”

Metro-Goldwyn-Mayer originally sought to pair new Swedish property Greta Garbo with Chaney, “the man of a thousand faces”, who was emerging as the studio’s top box office draw in 1927, but the female lead went to MGM starlet Joan Crawford.

Chaney collaborated with real-life armless double Paul Desmuke (sometimes credited as Peter Dismuki), who used his legs and feet to manipulate objects such as knives and cigarettes in frame with Chaney's upper body and face.

In the original screenplay, Alonzo murders both the doctor and Cojo to eliminate them as witnesses before he returns to claim Nanon, but these scenes never made it to the final print.

== Critical appraisal ==
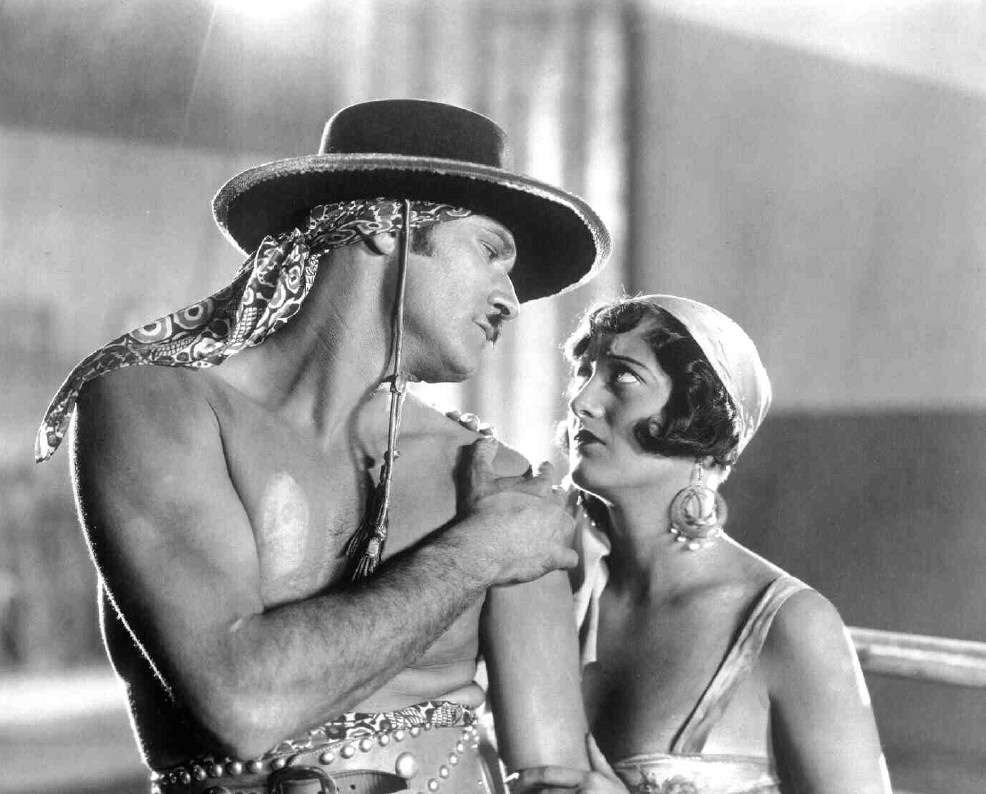
The Unknown, Norman Kerry as Malabar the Mighty and Joan Crawford as Nanon Zanzi

The Unknown is widely regarded as a masterpiece of the late silent film era and the most outstanding of the ten Browning-Chaney collaborations, eight of them at Metro-Goldwyn-Mayer. Browning's rendering of Alonzo and the horrific self-mutilation he endures to win the love of Nanon is reminiscent of the theatre of the Grand Guignol. In 2018, critic Scott Brogan observed that of all the films in that collaboration, The Unknown is most worthy of cult status.

Actor Burt Lancaster said that Chaney's portrayal in The Unknown featured “one of the most compelling and emotionally exhausting scenes I have ever seen an actor do.” (referring to the scene where Chaney realizes he has cut off his arms in vain.)

It is listed in the film reference book 1001 Movies You Must See Before You Die, which says, "Drawing a remarkable and haunting performance from Chaney and filling the plot with twists and unforgettable characters, Browning here creates a chilling masterpiece of psychological (and psychosexual) drama."

"There is no gainsaying the fact that this story is exceptionally tense melodrama that grips the interest and fascinates the spectator, but it is decidedly gruesome. Chaney's large following, however, has been educated to expect him in such roles, and certainly he has never given a finer performance. The manner in which he is shown using his feet as normal persons do their hands is remarkably well done and his facial expressions are wonderful--he uses no eccentric make-up in this role." ---Moving Picture World

"Although it has strength and undoubtedly sustains the interest, THE UNKNOWN...is anything but a pleasant story. It is gruesome and at times shocking, and the principal character deteriorates from a more or less sympathetic individual to an arch-fiend...Mr. Chaney really gives a marvelous idea of the Armless Wonder, for to act in this film he has learned to use his feet as hands when eating, drinking and smoking. He even scratches his head with his toe when meditating." ---The New York Times

"A good Chaney film that might have been great. Chaney and his characterizations invite stories that have power behind them. Every time Browning thinks of Chaney he probably looks around for a typewriter and says 'let's get gruesome.'" ---Variety

"(The Chaney) picture fascinates us, but then they make it so short that it left us bewildered and unsatisfied. But there is nothing that one can say of Mr. Chaney. His performances are always perfect." ---New York Herald Tribune

"Like other Chaney pictures directed by Tod Browning, this has a macabre atmosphere. If you wince at a touch or two of horror, don't go to The Unknown....It has a finely sinister plot, some moments with a real shock and Lon Chaney." ---Photoplay

"A gruesome and unpleasant picture....it is artistically acted and skillfully directed. But those facts do not atone for the offence given by the feature to every normal-minded movie-goer. Of Mr. Chaney's acting, it is enough to say it is excellent of its kind. Similar praise might be given the work of a skilled surgeon engaged in ripping open the abdomen of a patient. But who wants to see it??" ---Harrison's Reports

== Themes ==
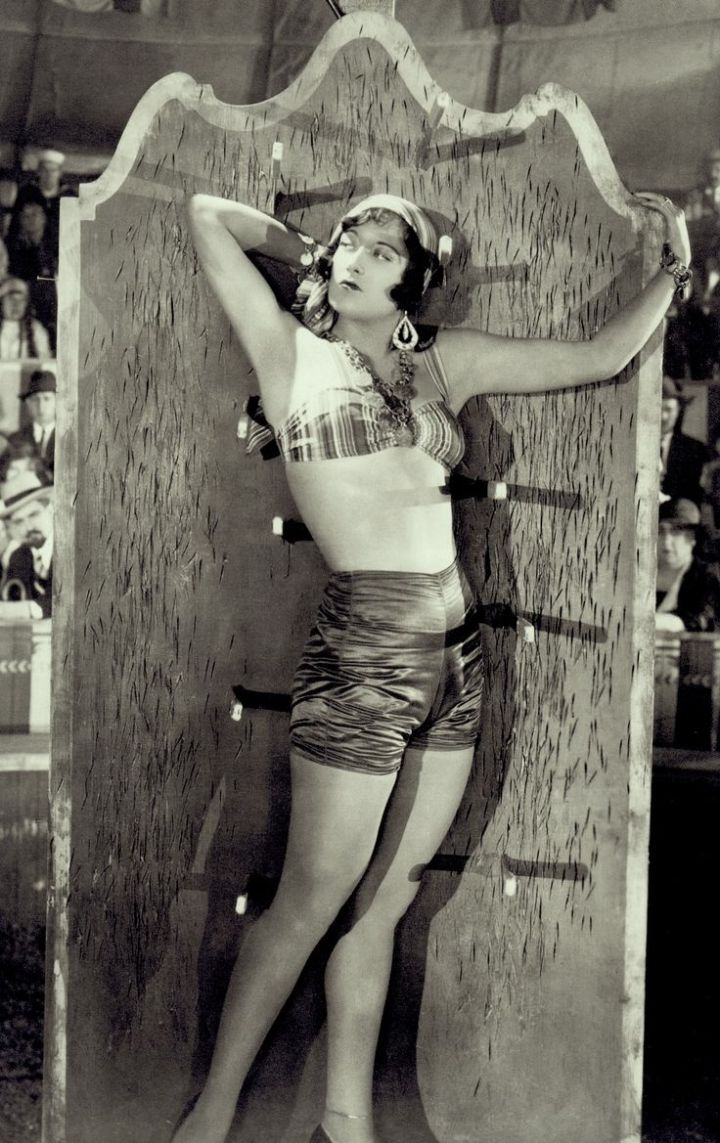
The Unknown (1927), Joan Crawford as Nanon.

Based on a story by director Tod Browning and a scenario by Waldemar Young, this tale of sexual obsession involving physical and emotional disfigurement unfolds in a circus setting—a setting that comports with Browning’s penchant for “the lower forms of spectacle and theatrical performance.”

Illusion and deception: Browning, demonstrating his delight in “demystifying the spectacles of show culture” opens The Unknown with the exposure of a simple carnival illusion: The Gypsy knife-thrower “Alonzo the Armless” masquerades as a double amputee who expertly hurls his projectiles with his feet. Browning quickly disabuses moviegoers of his deformity, as Alonzo, a fully intact man, uses a corset to bind his arms during performances to appear as a freak. Alonzo’s faux disability has a more sinister and practical purpose: as a criminal on the run from the law, his “armless” condition places him above suspicion by authorities.

Alonzo’s only genuine abnormality is a congenital bifid thumb on his right hand. This minor deformity is a key element that leads Alonzo to submit to a surgical enormity.

Sexual Frustration and Self-mutilation: The object of Alonzo’s tender and secret affection—Nanon (Joan Crawford) his dare-devil partner— harbors a neurotic phobia, an obsessive, hysterical revulsion to the embrace of a man’s arms. Her dysfunction (perhaps instilled by her pathological father, ringmaster Zanzi (Nick De Ruiz) undermines any sexual intimacy with the highly virile Alonzo, his sexual prowess symbolized by his knife-throwing expertise and his double thumb. A violent dispute with Zanzi leads Alonzo to strangle him to death. The only witness to the murder is Nanon, who discerns only a single feature of the assailant: a double thumb.

The logic of Alonzo’s dilemma serves as the rationale for Browning’s and Chaney’s most outrageous literary conceit: Alonzo, in order to make himself appealing to Nanon and eliminate the tell-tale bifid thumb, has both his arms amputated by a back alley surgeon, an act of symbolic self-castration, satisfying Nanon’s need for a “sexless” man.

Animal Attributes in Humans: Browning’s male protagonist frequently exhibits the instinctual and impulsive behavior of animals, arising from a physical abnormality. Examples include “Dead Legs” in West of Zanzibar (1928), who communes with a chimpanzee, “Tiger Haynes” a wildlife trapper in Where East is East (1929) and Dan “The Black Bird” Tate in The Black Bird (1926). Biographer Stuart Rosenthal points out this theme in The Unknown:

"Having a characterization in mind, Browning built his films by generating an elaborately interlocking structure of frustration around that individual. Frustration is Browning’s dominant theme.” - Biographer Stuart Rosenthal in Tod Browning: The Hollywood Professionals, Vol. 4 (1975).

“The typical Browning protagonist is a man who has been reduced to a state of an animal. In almost every instance he displays a physical deformity that reflects the mental mutilation he has suffered at some element of callous society...Alonzo, in The Unknown, is among the most rabid and instinctual of Browning's protagonists...”

Lon Chaney’s simian-like use of his feet is directly linked to his physical deformity, anticipating the primal ferocity of his reaction to Nanon’s betrayal in marrying circus strongman Malabar (Norman Kerry).

== Restoration ==
52 minute unreconstructed version

For many years the film was considered lost, until a 35 mm print was located at the Cinémathèque Française in 1968. In 1973, at a lecture given at George Eastman House, Cinémathèque Française director Henri Langlois said the delay in finding the print of The Unknown was because they had hundreds of film cans marked l'inconnu (French for "Unknown") in their collection. Several early scenes may be missing, but if so, they do not affect the story continuity. The rediscovered film ran 49 minutes at a projection speed of 24fps.

In 2022, a new restoration by George Eastman House premiered at the Pordenone Silent Film Festival; the running time was 66 minutes. The existing shortened version was augmented with footage from a newly-discovered Czech nitrate print which contained all the scenes missing from the other print. Restored shots/scenes include: the original opening scene of a boy watching the circus tent from a church tower and his father or grandfather giving him a coin so he can pay his way into the circus; audience reactions during Alonzo’s show; the fight between Alonzo and Costra after the show; and a scene of an old fortune-teller warning Nanon that something terrible is going to happen. This restoration of The Unknown made its home video debut in October 2023 as part of The Criterion Collection in a boxset that also includes Freaks and The Mystic.

== Soundtrack ==
In 1994, the Welsh composer and recording artist John Cale wrote a score to accompany the film, and performed it himself live for a screening at the Pordenone Silent Film Festival. A later performance was later released as an album.

For the Pordenone screening of the 2022 restoration, a new score was composed and performed by José María Serralde. Another new score was composed and performed by Philip Carli for the Alamo Drafthouse Cinema screenings in September 2023, which was later used for the Criterion release.

== Bibliography ==
- Brenez, Nicole. 2006. Body Dreams: Lon Chaney and Tod Browning- Thesaurus Anatomicus in The Films of Tod Browning, Bernd Herzogenrath, editor. Black Dog Publishing, London. ISBN 1-904772-51-X pp. 95–113.
- Brogan, Scott. 2008. The Unknown. https://silentfilm.org/the-unknown/ Retrieved 20 March 2021.
- Conterio, Martyn. 2018. Where to begin with Tod Browning. https://www.bfi.org.uk/features/where-begin-tod-browning Retrieved 15 January 2021.
- Diedmann, Stefanie and Knörer, Ekkehard. 2006. The Spectator’s Spectacle: Tod Browning’s Theatre in The Films of Tod Browning, Bernd Herzogenrath, editor. Black Dog Publishing. London. ISBN 1-904772-51-X pp. 69–77
- Eaker, Alfred. 2016. Tod Browning Retrospective https://alfredeaker.com/2016/01/26/todd-browning-director-retrospective/ Retrieved 26 February 2021.
- Herzogenrath, Bernd. 2006. The Films of Tod Browning. Black Dog Publishing. London. ISBN 1-904772-51-X
- Sobchack, Vivian. 2006. The Films of Tod Browning: An Overview Long Past in The Films of Tod Browning in The Films of Tod Browning, editor Bernd Herzogenrath, 2006 Black Dog Publishing. London. pp. 21–39. ISBN 1-904772-51-X
- Rosenthal, Stuart. 1975. Tod Browning: The Hollywood Professionals, Volume 4. The Tantivy Press. ISBN 0-498-01665-X
- Stafford, Jeff. 2003. The Unknown. Turner Classic Movies. Retrieved 20 March 2021.
