= Girl on the Bridge =

- Theatrical release poster
- Directed by: Patrice Leconte
- Written by: Serge Frydman
- Produced by: Christian Fechner
- Starring: Daniel Auteuil; Vanessa Paradis
- Cinematography: Jean-Marie Dreujou
- Edited by: Joëlle Hache
- Distributed by: UGC Fox Distribution
- Release date: 31 March 1999
- Running time: 90 minutes
- Country: France
- Language: French
- Box office: $5.1 million

The Girl on the Bridge (French: La fille sur le pont) is a 1999 French drama film shot in cinemascope and black and white and directed by Patrice Leconte, starring Daniel Auteuil and Vanessa Paradis.

== Plot ==
After an interview sequence with a girl who has suffered endless misfortunes in love, the plot centres around knifethrower Gabor (Auteuil) and the girl, called Adèle (Paradis), whom he meets as she prepares to kill herself by jumping from a Paris bridge. Gabor intervenes, persuading Adèle to become the target girl in his knifethrowing act, since she values her life so little. The film follows their relationship as they travel abroad, to Monaco then into Italy and onto a cruise ship, selling and performing their act to great success. Their companionship and teamwork bring great luck for both of them. When they are separated, she in Greece and he in Turkey, their lives once again become luckless. But melancholy overtakes Adèle and she leaves her partner and runs off with a young married Greek man - a short-lived romance which also signals the end of her good fortune. Gabor injures his new act partner during a performance; and he sinks into poverty, wandering Istanbul in search of his old partner. When he thinks he sees her he is knocked down by a lorry, and on leaving the hospital decides to end his life by jumping from a bridge. The film ends with Adèle this time saving Gabor from suicide.

The action of the film proper begins on the Passerelle Debilly in Paris, and ends on the Galata Bridge in Istanbul.

== Cast ==
- Daniel Auteuil as Gabor
- Vanessa Paradis as Adèle
- Frédéric Pfluger as Contortionist
- Demetre Georgalas as Takis
- Catherine Lascault as Irène
- Isabelle Petit-Jacques as Bride
- Mireille Mossé as Miss Memory
- Didier Lemoine as TGV ticket conductor
- Mylène Farmer (uncredited guest appearance in a hallway and beside the stage)
- Bertie Cortez as Kusak
- Stéphane Metzger as Italian waiter
- Claude Aufaure as Suicide victim
- Farouk Bermouga as TGV waiter
- Nicolas Donato as Mr. Loyal
- Enzo Etokyo as Italian megaphone
- Giorgios Gatzios as Barker

== Music ==
The soundtrack consists entirely of existing music, with Who Will Take My Dreams Away by Marianne Faithfull, I'm Sorry by Brenda Lee and Goodbye in a version of Benny Goodman recurring during the film. Other music includes other numbers by Benny Goodman (most notably Sing, Sing, Sing) and Noro Morales, Festival in Valencia by Charles Smitton, Italian music by the Orchestra Secondo Casadei, Turkish music from the Istanbul Oriental Ensemble, and the Austrian National Anthem.

== Release and box office ==
The film grossed 22.6 million Franc ($3.4 million) in France. Paramount Classics acquired the United States distribution rights to this film and gave it a limited U.S. theatrical release on July 28, 2000; the film went on to gross $1,708,839 in U.S. theaters, which was a good result for a non-English film. Ruth Vitale (president of Paramount Classics at that time) declared herself pleased with the film's performance in the U.S. market. However, Paramount did not release the film on DVD until July 2008.

== Reception ==
On the review aggregator website Rotten Tomatoes, 88% of 43 critics' reviews are positive. Metacritic, which uses a weighted average, assigned the film a score of 75 out of 100, based on 31 critics, indicating "generally favorable" reviews.

Roger Ebert of the Chicago Sun-Times gave the film three and a half out of four stars and wrote, "What's best about the movie is its playfulness."

=== Accolades ===
Daniel Auteuil won a César as best actor for his role in 2000, and a similar prize at the Festival de Sant Jordi in 2001. The film won the Prix du public at the Cinemania festival in Montréal in 1999 and the best foreign film at the Las Vegas Film Critics Society Awards in 2000.

== See also ==
- Impalement arts
