= 142nd New York Infantry Regiment =

- Active: August 14, 1862 - June 7, 1865
- Country: United States
- Allegiance: Union
- Branch: Infantry
- Engagements: Siege of Suffolk; Battle of Cold Harbor; Siege of Petersburg; Battle of the Crater; Battle of Chaffin's Farm; Battle of Fair Oaks & Darbytown Road; Second Battle of Fort Fisher; Carolinas campaign

The 142nd New York Infantry Regiment (a.k.a. "St. Lawrence County Regiment") was an infantry regiment in the Union Army during the American Civil War.

== Service ==
The 142nd New York Infantry was organized at Ogdensburg, New York, beginning August 14, 1862 and mustered in for three-years service on September 29, 1862 under the command of Colonel Roscius W. Judson.

The regiment was attached to 3rd Brigade, Abercrombie's Division, Defenses of Washington, D.C., to February 1863. 3rd Brigade, Abercrombie's Division, XXII Corps, Department of Washington, to April 1863. 2nd Brigade, 3rd Division, VII Corps, Department of Virginia, to May 1863. 1st Brigade, 2nd Division, IV Corps, to July 1863. 1st Brigade, 1st Division, XI Corps, Army of the Potomac, to August 1863. 1st Brigade, Gordon's Division, Folly Island, South Carolina, X Corps, Department of the South, to January 1864. 1st Brigade, Gordon's Division, Northern District, Department of the South, to April 1864. 1st Brigade, 2nd Division, X Corps, Army of the James, Department of Virginia and North Carolina, to May 1864. 3rd Brigade, 3rd Division, XVIII Corps, to June 1864. 1st Brigade, 2nd Division, X Corps, to December 1864. 1st Brigade, 2nd Division, XXIV Corps, to January 1865. 1st Brigade, 2nd Division, Terry's Provisional Corps, Department of North Carolina, to March 1865. 1st Brigade, 2nd Division, X Corps, Army of the Ohio, Department of North Carolina, to June 1865.

The 142nd New York Infantry mustered out June 7, 1865. Recruits and veterans were transferred to the 169th New York Infantry.

== Detailed service ==
Left New York for Washington, D.C., October 6, 1862. Duty in the defenses of Washington, D.C., until April 1862. Moved to Suffolk, Va., April 19. Siege of Suffolk, Va., April 20-May 4. Siege of Suffolk raised May 4. Expedition to Kings and Queens County May 15 (1 company). Dix's Peninsula Campaign June 24-July 7. Ordered to Washington, D.C., July 10. Pursuit of Lee to Berlin, Md., July 13–22. Moved to Folly Island, S.C., August 1–8. Siege operations against Forts Wagner and Gregg, Morris Island, S.C., and against Fort Sumter and Charleston, S.C., August 9-September 7. Operations against Charleston and duty at Folly Island, Johns Island, and Hilton Head, S.C., until April 1864. Expedition to Johns and James Islands February 6–14, 1864. Skirmishes at Bugbee's Bridge February 9 and 11. Ordered to Yorktown, Va., April 1864. Butler's Campaign on the south side of the James River and operations against Petersburg and Richmond May 4–28. Occupation of City Point and Bermuda Hundred May 5. Swift Creek or Arrow field Church May 9–10. Operations against Fort Darling May 12–16. Battle of Drewry's Bluff May 14–16. Bermuda Hundred May 16–28. Moved to White House, then to Cold Harbor May 28–31. Battles about Cold Harbor June 1–12. Before Petersburg June 15–18. Siege operations against Petersburg and Richmond June 16, 1864 to December 7, 1864. Mine Explosion, Petersburg, July 30. Duty in trenches before Petersburg and on the Bermuda Hundred front until September 27. Battle of Chaffin's Farm, New Market Heights, September 28–30. Battle of Fair Oaks October 27–28. Duty in trenches before Richmond until December. Expedition to Fort Fisher, N.C., December 7–27. 2nd Expedition to Fort Fisher, N.C., January 3–15, 1865. Assault and capture of Fort Fisher January 15. Cape Fear entrenchments February 11–13. Fort Anderson February 18–19. Capture of Wilmington February 22. Carolinas campaign March 1-April 26. Advance on Goldsboro March 6–21. Advance on Raleigh April 9–13. Occupation of Raleigh April 14. Bennett's House April 26. Surrender of Johnston and his army. Duty at Raleigh until June.

== Casualties ==
The regiment lost a total of 292 men during service; 3 officers and 126 enlisted men killed or mortally wounded, 2 officers and 161 enlisted men died of disease.

== Commanders ==
- Colonel Roscius W. Judson
- Colonel Newton Martin Curtis
- Colonel Albert Milton Barney

== Notable members ==
- Private Bruce Anderson, Company K - Medal of Honor recipient for action at the Second Battle of Fort Fisher
- Private Alaric B. Chapin, Company G - Medal of Honor recipient for action at the Second Battle of Fort Fisher
- Private George Merrill, Company I - Medal of Honor recipient for action at the Second Battle of Fort Fisher
- Private Zachariah C. Neahr, Company K - Medal of Honor recipient for action at the Second Battle of Fort Fisher

== See also ==
- List of New York Civil War regiments
- New York in the Civil War
