= Impalement arts =

Type of performing art with human targets

Astrid Schollenberger demonstrates the position of the target girl in the "profile" stunt.

Impalement arts are a type of performing art in which a performer plays the role of human target for a fellow performer who demonstrates accuracy skills in disciplines such as knife throwing and archery. Impalement is actually what the performers endeavor to avoid – the thrower or marksman aims near the target rather than at them. The objective is to land the throw or shot as close as possible to the assistant's body without causing injury.

Impalement arts are often found in circuses and sideshows as well as sometimes in variety, cabaret or burlesque shows. In addition, impalement acts have provided subject matter for literature, art, photography and film and television scripts.

There are important distinctions between knife throwing or archery practiced as competitive sports and similar skills displayed as impalement arts. For example, organizing bodies for competitive archery prohibit activity that involves deliberate shooting in the general direction of a human being.

== History ==
The precise origins of the impalement arts remain unknown, but its performance may reach back as far as antiquity. The Roman emperor Domitian (1st century AD) was said to entertain guests on his Alban estate with virtuoso displays of marksmanship. The historian Suetonius reported these acts in his biography of the emperor:

There are many who have more than once seen [Domitian] slay a hundred wild beasts of different kinds on his Alban estate, and purposely kill some of them with two successive shots in such a way that the arrows gave the effect of horns. Sometimes he would have a slave stand at a distance and hold out the palm of his right hand for a mark, with the fingers spread; then he directed his arrows with such accuracy that they passed harmlessly between the fingers..

Suetonius, De Vita Caesarum, "Life of Domitian", 19

Knife throwing performers are known to have performed in Europe and America in the 19th century, with recorded uses of the term "impalement" to describe this type of act as early as 1871. The growth of the impalement arts was greatly facilitated by the way that circus developed in the 19th and early 20th centuries, and in particular by American influences. Buffalo Bill's performances in Europe in 1887 resulted in a wave of popularity for Wild West shows and the "western arts" they involved, including knife throwing, archery, whip cracking and sharp shooting. In the circus world, the success of large-scale tented touring shows pioneered in America led to the introduction of more acts of skill and daring as well as the inclusion of sideshows, in which impalement acts sometimes featured. Among the most significant events were Barnum & Bailey's tours of Europe from 1897 to 1902, which made a huge impact on European circus owners and led them to adopt similar formats. As well as providing a friendly stage where impalement acts could rely on finding an audience, circus was a competitive environment in which shows and performers sought to out do each other and thus there were incentives to develop new stunts. Moving targets were an innovation used by European artists in the 1930s. A notable example is the Wheel of Death, which is recorded as having been introduced into the US in 1938 by The Gibsons, from Germany.

Another trend in the late 19th and early 20th centuries was that acts from circuses began to find work in permanent venues that were developing in rapidly growing towns and cities. In the US they found a place in vaudeville and burlesque shows. In Britain the equivalent was music hall. And in both America and Europe, cabaret was another format that sometimes embraced impalement artists. The advent of cinema and later television in the 20th century eventually led to a gradual decline in the venues in which the impalement arts had previously thrived, but a new home was created in the form of television variety shows. A knife throwing act was one of the first pieces of entertainment ever broadcast on television. When the BBC started the world's first practical television service with experimental transmissions in 1936 one of the types of programmes it produced were variety shows with circus artists. Those acts, which included the knife throwing Denvers, were thought to be very visual and thus suited to the new medium. Variety later became an important part of primetime schedules and remained so for decades.

Although television variety shows are no longer the central feature of network television that they once were, the acts they harboured have found new outlets. The impalement arts live on in modern versions of circus and burlesque and still manage to find an occasional broadcast showcase. An example of this is the recent trend for talent competitions styled on a "reality TV" format, such as America's Got Talent, which featured knifethrowing in its 2007 run.

== Forms and variations ==
Remember, it's not the thrower that counts — it's the target.

— knifethrower Gabor in the film Girl on the Bridge (La fille sur le pont)

The human target is the essential distinguishing feature of the impalement arts. It has been asserted by several sources, including well-known knife throwers, that the power and appeal of this type of act lies as much in audience appreciation of the target as in admiration of the skill of the thrower or archer. Various theories have been put forward to explain this, ranging from simple awe at the display of steely nerves and complete trust to more complex psychological and philosophical theories. While some point to overtones of sadomasochistic eroticism, others cite dramaturgical works and point to parallels with the story arc of the hero in classic drama. In particular the assistant's performance is said to mirror the plot device of the hero's ordeal, in which the hero proves their heroic qualities through self-sacrifice or by facing extreme peril.

The target or assistant role is most often taken by a female performer, sometimes known as a target girl, who commonly wears a revealing costume, thus adding an element of overt sexuality to the act. While a few contemporary acts feature a male in the target role, and some play upon role reversal, the traditional figure of a female target still prevails.

Generally speaking, the assistant, whether male or female, stands in front of a board, made of wood or some similar material, into which the knives or arrows are embedded. For some stunts the assistant is strapped to a moving board. There are several disciplines and a great variety of tricks and stunts that are performed within this basic format. Some tricks are done by performers in all disciplines while others are generally the preserve of one discipline. For example, moving target stunts, such as the "wheel of death", tend to be done by knife throwers but not by archers.

Impalement artists have adopted a variety of guises, including Wild West figures, "gypsy" characters or tuxedo-wearing cabaret performers. There have even been efforts to package impalement arts within dramatic productions, such as the play Pin Cushion, which consists of a monologue delivered by an actress as she takes part in a real knifethrowing act (see Theatre).

=== Disciplines ===
The impalement arts can be divided into distinct disciplines. While some performers specialise purely in one of the disciplines, others combine disciplines or even mix impalement arts into other types of performance.

- Knife throwing is the most common and well-known discipline within the impalement arts. It includes the throwing of axes, machetes and other sharp implements as well as knives.
- Archery is the other main discipline. An archer might use bows or crossbows or both.
- Sharpshooting: It is arguable that some firearms sharpshooting acts fall into the category of impalement arts when they involve a performer holding up targets for a marksman. Even when sharpshooting is not performed as an impalement art, it is sometimes grouped alongside knife throwing as a Wild West art. It also has much in common with crossbow shooting in terms of the accuracy skills involved.
- Whips and other disciplines: Disciplines such as bullwhip displays and trick roping are not strictly impalement arts but are often grouped with impalement art disciplines for a variety of reasons. Bullwhip artists and ropers sometimes employ human "targets" for certain tricks. Furthermore, some impalement arts performers also feature these other disciplines in their acts. In addition, all the above disciplines are sometimes placed within a common context, such as Wild West arts.

=== Tricks ===
There are many variations on the simple arrangement of having the assistant stand in front of a target board and remain still while knives, arrows or other objects land about them. Often the first type of variation in a routine is that the assistant will assume different poses. For example:

- Profile: This is a classic done by many performers. The assistant stands side-on to the board and then bends backwards. The impalement artist then aims a series of knives, axes or arrows along the line of the front edge of the assistant, beginning around the legs and ending with the last throw or shot coming close to the assistant's throat. One aspect of this pose is that it accentuates the vulnerability of the assistant, particularly with the last impact tantalisingly close to the throat. Another important aspect for knifethrowers is that the upper part of the assistant's body is positioned so that a series of throws can be landed above it - a flexible target girl might be able to place her neck and the upper part of her chest in a horizontal line. A skilled thrower can use the way that a knife turns in flight to land it sloping at a downward angle from the board; thus, the point of the knife can impact safely above the assistant but the rest of the knife can slope down and come very close indeed to the assistant's body, even making contact on some occasions.
- Headstand: An example from the repertoire of knife acts goes as follows: The assistant does a headstand against the target board; the thrower then throws two knives or axes, one into each of the two top corners of the target board; the assistant moves their legs apart until they touch the two implements embedded in the board; the thrower then throws a series of implements into the "V" formed by the assistants legs, progressing threateningly towards the crotch.

More complex stunts and challenges include:

- The Wheel of death: One of the most difficult and dangerous feats for a knifethrower. The assistant is strapped to a large circular target board which spins about its middle, like a wheel. The thrower must execute a series of rapid, consistent and carefully timed throws to land knives on the segments of the wheel not covered by the assistant's body. There are some variations in the exact configuration of "wheels": in some the assistant is positioned with their arms at their sides while in others the assistant is spreadeagled. Sometimes the "wheel" might not actually be circular: shield shapes and rectangular rotating boards have been known and all will work as "wheels" as long as they are correctly balanced to rotate smoothly when the assistant is in place. A particularly challenging version of this stunt is "The Veiled Wheel", in which the target is covered with a paper screen so the thrower can't see the assistant. Only four artists are known to have attempted this dangerous trick. It was first performed by The Gibsons in the 1930s; a duo named The Zeros followed them in the 1940s, Fritz Brumbach did it in Monte Carlo in 1978 and The Great Throwdini revived it in New York in October 2010 with Melissa-Anne Ainley acting as his target girl.
- The Devil's door: A moving target challenge pioneered by knifethrower Larry Cisewski. This time the assistant is on a door-sized rectangular board that spins about a central vertical axis. Again the thrower must execute a series of rapid, consistent and carefully timed throws to land knives on parts of the board not covered by the assistant's body. Sometimes the aim is to hit the back of the board in the moments that the assistant is turned away from the thrower. Other throwers have placed a vertical row of knives down the sides of the assistant at the moments when the assistant turns to face them.
- Balloon bursting: The assistant stands in front of the target board and holds balloons which the thrower or archer then attempts to burst. Balloons can be held in the hand, positioned under arms or between the legs and sometimes an assistant will hold a balloon between their teeth.
- William Tell: There are various stunts inspired by the story of William Tell, who, according to legend, was forced to shoot an apple off of his son's head with a crossbow. Modern impalement artists have performed similar feats. In some ways the Tell legend can be seen as one of the earliest inspirations for the impalement arts.
- Impaling a card or paper plate: The assistant stands in front of the target board and holds out a card, or paper plate which the thrower or archer attempts to pin to the board. The level of danger can be varied to some extent by whether the assistant holds the card at full arms length or keeps it close. The Jasters do a "William Tell" version in which the card is balanced on the head of target girl Elena Busnelli.
- Cutting a straw or flower stem: An assistant holds a straw or flower in their mouth and the impalement artist attempts to chop the tip of it off. This is mostly associated with knife throwers and bullwhip artists.
- Blind: The thrower or archer wears a blindfold. Generally the assistant first guides the blindfolded impalement artist into position facing towards the target board. The assistant then stands in place against the board and gives an audible signal to commence the stunt. The implication is that the impalement artist then has to aim on the basis of where they remember the target to be. There is a trick behind this stunt and budding impalement artists are warned not to attempt it unless coached by an experienced professional.
- Covered target: The assistant is covered so that the thrower or archer cannot see exactly where they are. The covering is made of paper or some other flimsy material so that knives or arrows will pass through it. The implication is that the thrower or archer must estimate the position of the assistant using memory and other indirect guides and aim on that basis.
- Double ladder of death: This involves two knifethrowers simultaneously performing a rapid sequence of throws at the same target board while aiming so that the trajectories of their knives cross. The throwers stand side by side facing the assistant at the board. The knives from the thrower on the right land on the left side of the target board while the knives from the thrower on the left impact to the right. Each thrower aims their next knife vertically above where they placed the preceding one, so that a ladder of knives is formed up each side of the assistant. This stunt was pioneered by The Great Throwdini in partnership with Harry Munroe.
- Vegetable slice: A cucumber (or similar vegetable) is held on the bare skin of the assistant's body (usually the inside of her forearm). A series of knives are thrown around the assistant, ending with a knife that slices the cucumber in half. This stunt was performed by Jack Dagger on History Channel's More Extreme Marksmen and The Tonight Show with Conan O'Brien.

== Myths ==
Astrid Schollenberger in rehearsal faces the knives for real. One is captured in flight, fractions of a second before impact.

It is occasionally alleged that knife throwing acts are actually a trick in which the thrower palms the knife as he pretends to throw it and a knife springs out from the target, giving the illusion of perfect aim. Although this technique has been used by at least one magician to emulate knife throwing, the great majority of knife throwers perform genuine acts. There are secret tricks behind certain stunts, such as throwing while blindfolded, but they do not involve fake knives springing from the target board.

Injuries suffered by performers provide evidence of the genuine nature of the impalement acts in question. Examples include the cases of Yana Rodionova, injured in a televised stunt with knife thrower Jayde Hanson, and French target girl Catherine Jamet, of Duo Grey Arrow, who suffered a near fatal wound during a crossbow act at the World Circus Festival in Paris in 2001. Testimonials to the genuineness of knife acts are also to be found in the autobiographical writings of several former target girls.

== Notable artists ==
The impalement arts have evolved as the product of a history of performance dating back to at least the 19th century. That heritage, and especially the collective achievements of notable performers, helps to define the subject. As with other performance arts, judgements about who might be the most notable are highly subjective and clouded by the hyperbole of publicity. For similar reasons it is also sometimes difficult to resolve debates about who originated particular stunts. Nevertheless, some names recur frequently in historical records and current news. Some are recognised for pioneering achievements, some for bringing the arts to widespread audiences and some as distinctive characters who, although less famous, have had significant influence on their peers. Because this is not a league table of merit and because overlaps make a chronological presentation awkward, they are presented here in alphabetic order under the two main disciplines.

=== Knife throwing ===
- Sylvester and Barbara Braun - This husband and wife began performing their "Wizards of the West" act in the early 1940s. Sixty years later they were honoured by the International Knifethrowers Hall of Fame with the "Knife Throwing Pioneer Award" and the title "Wild West Duo of the 20th Century".
- The Brumbachs/Los Alamos - A renowned German family act now in its second generation. They began with Fritz Brumbach as thrower and his wife Helga as target girl. Later daughter Sylvia joined the act as a second target girl and then son Patrick became a thrower. They have made many television appearances. Fritz appeared on Circus of the Stars in 1986 with Britt Ekland as his target girl. Fritz and Helga have since retired but Patrick and Sylvia continue the act. Fritz is a Guinness World Record holder for rapid throwing around a live target.
- Larry Cisewski - Cisewski has made numerous film and television appearances. He provided knife throwing skills for the film The Fan. His television work includes The Merv Griffin Show, Real People, The Dick Clark Special, and a performance on the December 1981 edition of Circus of the Stars with actress Sally Kellerman as his target girl. He is also noted for developing the "Devil's door" rotating target stunt.
- Steve Clemente - Clemente was a Mexican actor known for playing villains in movies and serials in the 1930s. Clemente developed a passion for knife throwing when he was a child. This skill later helped win him acting and stunt work in Hollywood and he was trusted to throw knives around movie stars. He appeared in more than 60 movies and threw knives in about ten of them, including The Sideshow (1928), The Mask of Fu Manchu (1932), The Gallant Fool (1933), Fighting Through (1934), Under Two Flags (1936), Mad Youth (1940), Sing Your Worries Away (1942), and Perils of Nyoka (1942).
- Elizabeth and Collins - Hungarian thrower Martin Collins had travelled Europe as a circus performer in the 1930s. He met and married Elizabeth around the time of the outbreak of World War 2 after spotting her as a potential performing partner. They spent the war years in neutral Sweden and later settled in Britain. Collins developed a signature trick that involved doing the wheel of death stunt while he balanced on a tightrope. Their act took them to nightclubs and vaudeville theaters around the world and they were one of the first impalement acts to break into television. Elizabeth retired from performing in the early 1960s and was replaced by their daughter who was also named Elizabeth (although additionally known as Agnes). Elizabeth and Collins performed on The Ed Sullivan Show three times and appeared as themselves in an episode of the 1960s spy series The Avengers.
- Joe "Brokenfeather" Darrah - Joseph Darrah was born in 1957 and began throwing knives at the age of five under the tuition of his father, an ex-Ranger. At 19 he was hired by a traveling circus as a knife thrower and bullwhip artist. He later became a highly successful tournament thrower.
- Jack Dagger - Dagger is the knife throwing stage persona of Todd Abrams, who styles himself as "The King of Fling". His signature stunt is cutting a cucumber or similar vegetable held on his assistant's arm. Abrams is also an actor, whip artist, and juggler and performed as Adam Sandler's "stunt hands" in the motion picture You Don't Mess with the Zohan. He was inducted into the International Knife Throwers Hall of Fame in 2005 as "Impalement Artist of the Year" and was honoured as "National Knife Throwing Performer of the Year" in 2006.
- The Denvers - The Denvers were the first knife throwing act ever to appear on television. They were chosen as one of a number of variety acts to appear in test broadcasts from the pioneering BBC Television studio at Alexandra Palace in London prior to the second world war. Their first documented appearance was in a test transmission on 24 October 1936; on 14 November 1936, they appeared in an episode of the TV variety show Cabaret. They also appeared in a programme transmitted in 1946 following the post-war resumption of broadcasts. A film record of the 1946 performance exists and there is a recording of a radio broadcast made at the time of their 1936 performance.
- Paul "Judge" Desmuke - Born in 1876, Desmuke was a sideshow performer, justice of the peace and occasional actor who was remarkable for the fact that he had no arms (he threw knives and manipulated objects with his feet). Desmuke gained his nickname Judge because he became a justice of the peace in Jourdanton, Texas. He later learned to throw knives and worked with the A. G. Barnes Circus and Sideshow and with Zack Miller's Wild West Show. He worked as a double for Lon Chaney in the 1927 silent film The Unknown, in which Chaney played an armless knife thrower. Desmuke married a woman named Mae Dixon in 1926 and she worked with him as his target girl in an impalement act which featured in the Ripley's Odditorium at the "Century of Progress" International Exposition in Chicago in 1933. He is sometimes credited as Peter Dismuki. Desmuke died in 1949.
- The Gibsons - Joe and Hannah Gibson came originally from Germany but later performed in the United States and have been credited with bringing the wheel of death stunt to America. They featured in Ringling Brothers and Barnum & Bailey's shows at Madison Square Garden in 1938.
- Caroline Haerdi - Haerdi a Swiss knife thrower who stands out as a woman in a trade that seems to be almost exclusively male. In the past she performed under the name Risk Ladies with a target girl called Claude Chantal Blanc, who is an experienced aerial and tight wire artist. Caroline Haerdi currently works in partnership with a male thrower named Arno Black; she as the thrower and he as the target.
- Dick Haines - Haines began throwing knives at an early age and became part of The Haines Family Circus. The show included high wire, a magic act, fire eating, and whips, as well as knife throwing. He has taught a number of other noted throwers.
- Jayde Hanson - Hanson is a British knifethrower who achieved a degree of notoriety as a result of a number of incidents in which he injured his partner Yana Rodionova during performances. Those incidents included an accident in which a knife struck Miss Rodionova in the head while the couple were attempting a world record feat live on the ITV This Morning television programme in April 2003. The couple work with the Cottle and Austen Circus and on a number of occasions the circus achieved significant media coverage by advertising for a replacement target girl because Yana was supposedly quitting the act. However, she continued to work with Hanson and the couple were married in 2004.
- Jonny King - A Dutch thrower who specialised in cabaret work. Among other things he is notable for working with German artist Timm Ulrichs to create a performance video piece titled Messerwurf-Porträt 1978/91. King is also noted for stunts in which he planted knives particularly close to and even touching his assistants, a skill he demonstrated on the final episode of the UK television show The Secret Cabaret in 1992.
- Paul Lacross - Paul LaCross was billed as the "World's Fastest, Fanciest Gunslinger, Knife and Tomahawk Thrower." His interest in throwing and sharp shooting began in the Boy Scouts and he became set on a performing career after seeing a cowboy demonstrating skills with guns and knives at a sportsmen's show. His television credits include The Merv Griffin Show, Thrill Seekers with Chuck Connors, The Mike Douglas Show, What's My Line, To Tell The Truth, and an appearance on Circus of the Stars in 1983, in which movie actress Linda Blair was his target girl. He performed at Carnegie Hall in New York and Massey Hall in Toronto, Canada. His major foreign performances included a tour of Russia with the United States Circus under the Cultural Exchange Program, Expo 70 in Japan and the 1977 Auckland, New Zealand Easter show. He was also known for writing and other activity encouraging others to take up throwing. He died in August 1993 at the age of 78.
- Harry Munroe - Munroe is best known as a maker of throwing knives used by other noted performers. As a thrower he has performed alongside The Great Throwdini as well as with his own act, Xtreme Behaviour. In 2005 he was honoured by the International Knife Throwers Hall of Fame as "International Knife Maker of the Year".
- Texas Slim and Montana Nell - These were the performing aliases of Robert and Pearl Collins. Robert Collins began performing as a knifethrower around 1900 and by 1910 was working for Buffalo Bill Cody's Wild West Show. He married Pearl, a skilled horse rider, in 1929 and they formed a travelling act featuring a selection of western arts. They retired in 1950. They were posthumously honoured by the International Knife Throwers Hall of Fame in 2006.
- The Great Throwdini (aka Rev Dr David Adamovich) - Adamovich started throwing later in life than many other top performers, following multiple careers that included exercise physiology, pool hall management and ordained minister. He is noted for fast throwing and for reviving the impalement arts amid the modern burlesque and cabaret scene in New York. He holds a number of world records. Together with target girl Tina Nagy he appeared in the 2007 series of the NBC television show America's Got Talent, succeeding in the first round but dropping out before the final. Other television appearances include Late Night with Conan O'Brien and NBC's Guinness World Records Live: The Top 100. He is a co-author of one of the few books on the subject of the impalement arts.
- Two Tornados Irene and Rolf Stey are members of an old Swiss circus family who did a knife act between 1965 and 1985 and made various television appearances, including a performance at the International Circus Festival of Monte-Carlo. They are one of only two acts other than Elizabeth and Collins to have done the simultaneous combination of throwing from a tightrope and the wheel of death.
- George "Skeeter" Vaughan (aka Grey Otter) - Vaughan was a Cherokee who served in the US Army in the second world war and worked at various times as a lumberjack, Hollywood stunt man and impalement artist. He made numerous national television appearances including Truth or Consequences, Thrillseekers, a minor role in Magnum, P.I. and performances on Circus of the Stars in 1977 with actress Ann Turkel as his target girl and again in 1979 with Charlene Tilton braving the knives. He died in 1989 and was posthumously honoured by the International Knife Throwers Hall of Fame in 2006.
- Che Che Whitecloud (aka Kenneth Lawrence Pierce) - Whitecloud is a Native American whose father Lawrence Pierce (aka Chief Whitecloud) and great-grandfather Willett Pierce were also knife throwers. Che Che is noted among his peers for his ability to throw knives rapidly one after another. In 2004 he was honoured by the International Knife Throwers' Hall of Fame as the "Outstanding Knife Thrower of the 20th Century".
- Sandra and Tommy Thompson - The Thompsons had a "Wheel of Death" act with many circuses, including Hagen Brothers, Clyde Beatty-Cole Brothers, and King Brothers. Tommy was also a sword swallower who is in the Sword Swallowers Hall of Fame. Sandra was stuck twice during their career; once in the thigh and once in the ear. When she was stuck in the ear, six women in the audience fainted. The next night their performance was to standing room only.
- The Great Cindini (aka Cynthia Morrison) performs in her sideshow "Lethal Injection" at festivals, fairs and theatres. She was inspired to become a knife thrower by her mentor the Great Throwdini. She was an extra in the 1981 movie Body Heat and has also been directed in plays by actor Burt Reynolds. She was featured as the Knife Thrower in the independent film The Big Top (2009), which had its premier at the historic Colony Theatre in Miami Beach, Florida.
- Lash and Steel - Lash and Steels are a knife throwing and whip cracking act consisting of American Baptist evangelist John Bailey and his wife Monika. Bailey has won numerous titles in knife throwing competitions and has also set world records. He is president and founder of the World Knife Throwers Guild Inc., a board member of the International Knife Throwers Hall of Fame and a charter member of the American Knife Throwers Association. He also designs throwing knives and other types of implements for the Boker company in Germany.

=== Archery and crossbow acts ===
- Aldebaran - He is part of the troupe "Velocity Circus" and performs with a target girl who is also a contortion and balance artist. He shoots apples, balloons and other objects which she holds while performing acrobatic balances.
- Duo Grey Arrow - Catherine Jamet, the 39-year-old target girl in this experienced French husband-and-wife act, suffered a serious injury in 2001 when she was hit under her eye while her husband was trying to perform a "William Tell" stunt at the World Circus Festival in Paris. The couple were reported to be planning to continue performing the act once she had recovered.
- The Hartzells - Ross and Elisa Hartzell are a US-based married couple who both descend from long established circus families. They perform a variety of crossbow stunts including a multiple ricochet trick similar to that done by Duo Varanne (see below). The Hartzells have been credited with setting a world record for the largest number of arrows triggered by a single crossbow shot.
- The Jasters - Elena Busnelli and Giacomo Sterza, who feature knife throwing as well as archery, are both from old circus families. They have worked in various major circuses in Europe.
- Guy Tell - A French crossbow performer who, along with his partner Regina Bouglione, has worked with Circus Knie in Europe and with Barnum's Kaleidoscape in the United States.
- Duo Varanne - Duo Varanne are a crossbow act who work in circuses across Europe and are noted for a "multiple ricochet" trick in which a series of crossbows are triggered in sequence, each by the shot from the one before. They are part of a circus family that also includes a motorcycle "globe of death" act.
- Mr & Mrs G - Ottavio Gesmundo and Naomi Brenkman-Gesmundo are a married couple who perform a show called The Crossbow Tango, which combines tango dancing, adagio, and martial arts with crossbow marksmanship. There is no assistant, as they take turns shooting small objects out of hands and mouths. They have performed in Las Vegas and Laughlin, Nevada.
- Johnny Strange - An English performer whose shows include demonstrations of mind over body, the impalement arts, dangerous juggling, escape artistry and feats of physical endurance. He uses a crossbow to perform a variety of trick shots.

== Fictional or artistic representations ==
The impalement arts have been featured in movies, television, literature and art. These representations, rather than real acts, will have provided many people with the main basis of their ideas about the impalement arts. Impalement acts have proved to be useful plot devices and have provided iconic images. The following sections provide some examples by way of illustration.

=== Movies and television ===
Perhaps the most notable movie example is the French film Girl on the Bridge (1999), in which a knife throwing act is at the centre of the plot and serves as a powerful erotic metaphor. Vanessa Paradis stars as Adele, a girl who attempts suicide by jumping from a bridge but is saved by knife thrower Gabor, played by Daniel Auteuil, who persuades her to become his target girl. Other examples include:

- In episode six of American Horror Story: Freak Show, "Bullseye" (November 2014), character Elsa Mars (Jessica Lange) throws knives at Paul 'The Illustrated Seal' (Mat Fraser) as he spins on a wheel of death.
- The fourth season of the television series Bones, featured an episode (first aired in 2009) in which title character Temperance "Bones" Brennan goes undercover as a target girl with Special Agent Seeley Booth as a knife-thrower.
- The film Gangs of New York (2002) features a confrontation between the main protagonists in which Cameron Diaz's character Jenny Everdeane acts as a target girl in an impromptu knifethrowing act with the villain, Bill 'The Butcher' Cutting, played by Daniel Day-Lewis.
- In the television series Nikki, the episode titled "The Jupiter and Mary Chain", first aired in 2001, featured the characters played by Nikki Cox and Susan Egan taking jobs as target girls.
- The television play The Act (1987) revolved around a knife throwing act. It was made for the BBC and was a co-production involving the Royal College of Art. It starred Caroline Embling and Bill Rourke. Real life knife thrower Jay Ruffley provided throwing skills in one scene and also appeared as the owner of a club.
- The 1987 television movie If It's Tuesday It Still Must Be Belgium features Courteney Cox as a character who becomes a target girl in a circus knife throwing act.
- The James Bond film Octopussy (1983) features two henchmen called Mischka and Grischka (played by David and Anthony Meyer) who are knife throwing performers in the circus run by the title character.
- The movie Bronco Billy (1980) features Clint Eastwood as a sharpshooter and knife thrower who runs a travelling circus. A key plot element involves Sondra Locke as a character who becomes a target girl.
- In the television series Charlie's Angels, Cheryl Ladd's character Kris Munroe goes undercover as a target girl in an episode titled "Circus of Terror" (1977).
- "Conspiracy of Silence" (1963), an episode of the television spy series The Avengers, featured a knife throwing act played by real artists Elizabeth and Collins.
- In the 1960s, knife throwing acts provided iconic scenes in several horror or suspense films set in circuses. These include the following three films, which all used Billy Smart's Circus for location filming:
  - Circus of Horrors (1960), in which Vanda Hudson played a target girl called Magda von Meck.
  - Circus of Fear (1966), which features British actress Margaret Lee as an assistant facing danger in a knife act.
  - Berserk! (1967), in which Judy Geeson played a target girl in a circus knife act.
- The film Phantom of the Rue Morgue (1954) has an early scene featuring a knife throwing act. The movie was shot using a 3-D system, which was used to give audiences the impression that knives were flying at them.
- In "Lucy Tells the Truth" (1953), an episode of the television series I Love Lucy, a white lie leads to Lucille Ball's character taking a job as the assistant in a knife act.
- The movie Egypt by Three (1953) comprises three stories, the first of which is about a knife throwing act. The thrower and his target girl have an affair but the thrower is married to another woman. When the wife finds out about the affair it leads to a potentially deadly situation.
- The 1951 movie The Knife Thrower is based on a short story by Guy de Maupassant about a circus knife thrower with an unfaithful wife. The thrower's wife, who is also his target girl, is having an affair with a magician.
- The movie The Sideshow (1928) features a knife throwing act in the climactic scene. The knife thrower was played by Steve Clemente and his assistant by Janet Ford.
- The movie The Unknown (1927) stars Lon Chaney as an armless man who throws knives in a circus act. It also stars Joan Crawford as the target girl who becomes the focus of his crazed love. Chaney's performance is cited by actors and critics as one of the greatest ever captured on film. In some shots, including parts of the knife throwing scenes, Chaney is doubled by real armless knife thrower Paul "Judge" Desmuke.

=== Theatre and opera ===
- The play Pin Cushion, by Clay McLeod Chapman, is based on a husband and wife knife throwing act and consists of the target girl delivering a monologue while her husband throws knives around her. It was performed as part of Chapman's Pumpkin Pie Show at The Red Room Theatre, New York, in May and June 2002. The performance involved a genuine knife throwing act, with actress Niabi Caldwell as the target girl and professional knife thrower David Adamovich (aka The Great Throwdini) playing her husband.
- Queen of Knives, by American composer Eric Stern, is a full-length opera which tells the story of a brother and sister knife-throwing act in the midst of student protests in the early 1960s. It was first performed in a joint production by Vagabond Opera and Wanderlust Circus at the Interstate Cultural Firehouse Center in Portland, Oregon, in May 2010.

=== Literature ===
- Steven Millhauser's short story The Knife Thrower features a thrower who specialises in nicking or marking those who stand at the target board for him. It was published in 1998 as part of a collection that bears the same title.
- The novel Knives of Desire by Marion Zimmer Bradley (writing under the pen name Morgan Ives) is about a woman who becomes involved in a lesbian relationship after joining a circus to be the target girl for a female knife thrower. The cover of the original edition, published in 1966, shows two women in skimpy bikinis, one standing against a target board and the other throwing a knife.
- The short story The Artist by Guy de Maupassant (1850–1893) concerns a circus knife thrower who wants to kill his wife. It is hinted that he might do this by feigning an accident while she acts as his target girl. The twist is that he finds this impossible because he has trained himself so well that his reflexes prevent it.
- The relationship between a target girl and a circus knifethrower is the central motif in the poem cycle Das Mädchen und der Messerwerfer published in 1997 by noted German poet Wolf Wondratschek.

=== Art (including photography) ===
- Model Karen Elson is seen spinning on a "wheel of death" target in a picture by photographer Steven Meisel that formed part of a series titled "The Greatest Show on Earth" in the April 2007 issue of the Italian edition of Vogue magazine.
- Model Kate Moss appeared on a "wheel of death" target in two of a series of fashion photos by Mert Alas and Marcus Piggott in the April 2006 issue of W magazine.
- Actress Jennifer Ellison appeared strapped to a "wheel of death" target and surrounded by knives in the UK edition of Maxim magazine in 2005. The picture was reproduced in the Daily Star newspaper on 1 December 2005.
- Rock group The White Stripes appeared as a knife throwing act in a photo by Annie Leibovitz in 2003 that was part of a series which appeared in a book and an exhibition, both titled Annie Leibovitz: American Music.
- Singer and musician Shakira appeared standing against a target with knives around her in a photo in the April 2002 issue of FHM magazine (UK edition).
- In 2002 the Channel Islands bailiwick of Guernsey issued a 40p postage stamp featuring a picture of a knifethrower. It was part of a set titled "Europa: The Circus".
- Actress Goldie Hawn appeared in a circus costume strapped to a "wheel of death" target for a magazine photoshoot in the 1990s.
- The cover of Stick It to Ya, the debut album by heavy metal band Slaughter, was infamous for a picture by photographer Glen Wexler of former Playboy playmate Laurie Carr wearing a swimsuit, strapped to a target board and surrounded by knives. The cover of a subsequent release, Stick It Live, featured an image apparently from the same shoot as the first but this time showing the target girl walking towards the board hand-in-hand with a knife thrower.
- The picture Le Lanceur De Couteaux ("The Knife Thrower") painted in 1943 by Henri Matisse (1869–1954) is an abstract image in which it is possible to discern representations of a thrower and an assistant.
- German artist Timm Ulrichs worked with knife thrower Jonny King to produce the performance video piece Messerwurf-Porträt 1978/91.
- The work of German post-modern painter and photographer Sigmar Polke includes a piece titled Messerwerfer (1975), which shows a target girl spinning on a wheel of death and a man preparing to throw a knife.

There are a plethora of cartoon or comic strip images featuring impalement arts acts, often in a humorous context.

=== Other ===
- The well-known Playmobil range of toys, marketed at children aged between six and twelve, once included two different sets featuring figures of a knife thrower and assistant. The Knifethrowing circus act set, which was retailed from 1978 until 1982, consisted of a target girl on a rotating "wheel of death" and a knife thrower, both dressed in "wild west" type costumes. The Circus Performers set, released in June 1982 and discontinued in 1987, also contained a similar knife thrower and assistant with a wheel of death target, but their costumes were different and there were three other figures in the set.

== See also ==
- Archery
- Burlesque
- Circus
- Circus skills
- Knife throwing
- Magician's assistant
- Music Hall
- Sideshow
- Target girl
- Trick roping
- Variety Shows
- Vaudeville
- Wild West shows

== Bibliography ==
- Adamovich, Heil & Schollenberger, A Day on Broadway: The art of being a knife thrower's assistant, Turnshare (London, 2005), ISBN 1-903343-73-9,
- Bobby Branton, "Last of the Professional Throwers", Blade magazine, (January 1996)
- Frances Brown, "Sensational Impalements" in Fairground Strollers and Showfolk, pub. Ronda Books (2001), ISBN 0-9521282-1-7, pp. 109–116
- Ronnie Claire Edwards, The Knife Thrower's Assistant: Memoirs of a Human Target, Hawk Publishing Group, (October 2000), ISBN 978-1-930709-16-4
- Marc Hartzman, American Sideshow: An encyclopedia of history's most wondrous and curiously strange performers, Tarcher/Penguin, (2005), ISBN 1-58542-441-2
- Harry K. McEvoy, Knife and Tomahawk Throwing: The Art of the Experts, Tuttle Publishing (December 1997), ISBN 0-8048-1542-9
- Harry K. McEvoy, Knife Throwing: A Practical Guide, Tuttle Publishing (August 2004), ISBN 978-0-8048-1099-9
- Ula the Painproof Rubber Girl, The Knife Thrower's Assistant, an article on the impalement arts from the point of view of a target girl (2003)
