= Glens Falls Cemetery =

Historic cemetery in New York, United States

- U.S. National Register of Historic Places
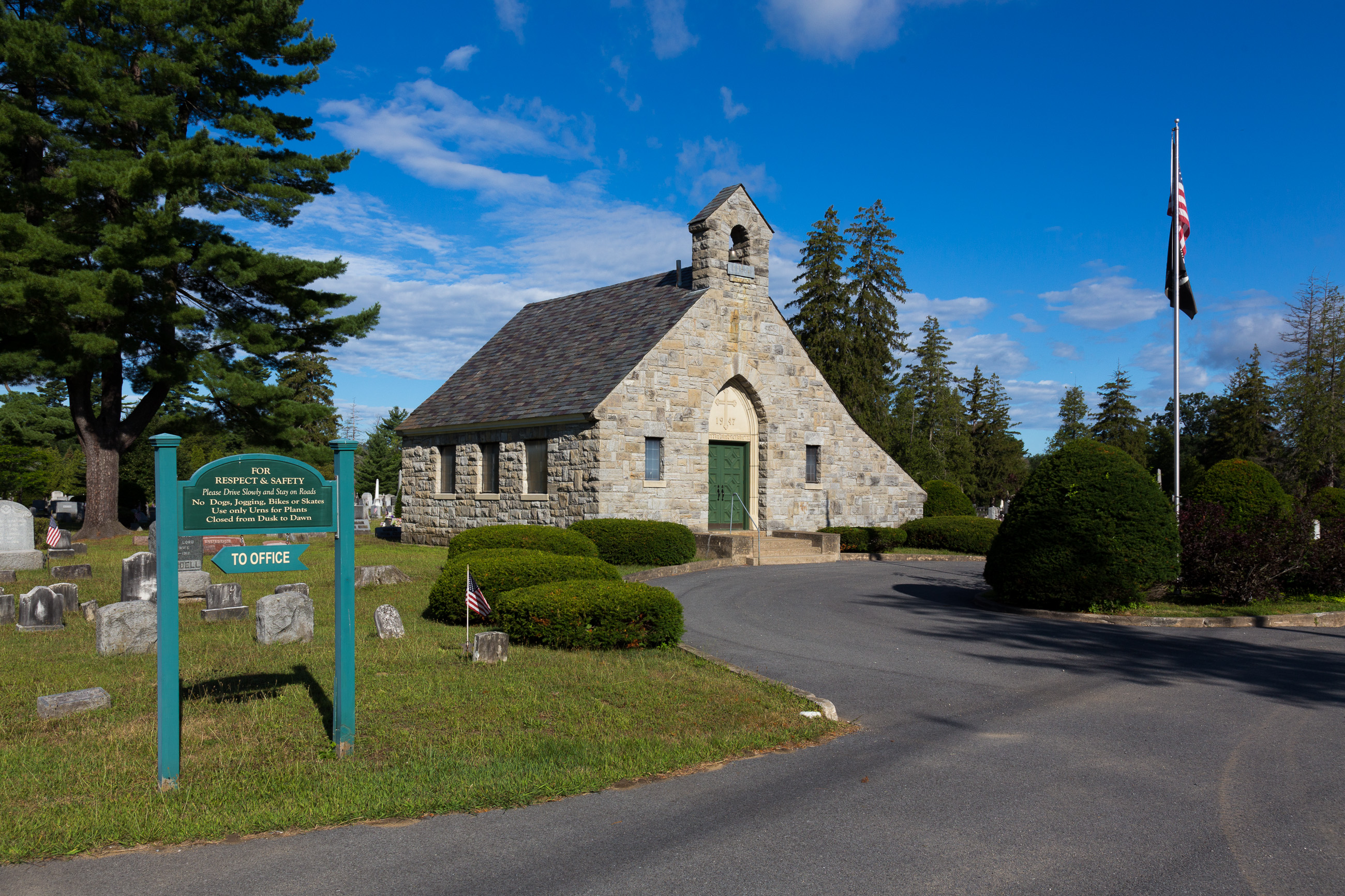
- Chapel and entrance on Bay Street

- Location within New York Location within the United States
- Location: 38 Ogden St., Glens Falls, New York
- Coordinates: 43°19′16″N 73°39′13″W
- Area: 38 acres (15 ha)
- Built: 1853
- Architect: Ferguson, George; Crandell, Milton Lee
- MPS: Glens Falls MRA
- NRHP reference No.: 04000756
- Added to NRHP: July 28, 2004

Glens Falls Cemetery is a historic cemetery located at Glens Falls, Warren County, New York. It was established in 1853 as a 13-acre cemetery and expanded in 1871, 1888, and five times between 1913 and 1973 to a total of 38 acres.

== History ==
In 1853, the village purchased 13 acres from Andrew Porteus of Queensbury, New York for the sum of $1000, with $500 set aside for grading and fencing. The first burial took place in 1855, but there are several older markers which were moved here from the old West Street Cemetery in the early 1870s.

After several expansions, the cemetery now spans 32 acres with over 12,000 burials.

== Notable interments ==
- Harry Elkes (1878–1903), was a champion bicycle racer who died during a race in 1903
- Orange Ferriss (1814–1894), US Congressman
- Franklin Johndro (1835–1901), a Union Army soldier in the American Civil War who received the Medal of Honor
- Frederick A. Johnson (1833–1893), US Congressman
- George Merrill (1847–1925), was a Union Army soldier during the American Civil War who received the Medal of Honor
- "Broncho Charlie" Miller, the last Pony Express rider, died in 1955, claiming to be 105 years old.
- Joseph Russell (1800–1875), US Congressman

== Notable structures ==
The Memorial Chapel (1946) is a small, front gabled stone building with a slate roof. The cemetery office (1950) is a concrete stucco finished building with a peaked slate roof. The cemetery includes a number of notable burial monuments and mausoleums.

It was added to the National Register of Historic Places in 2004.

== Gallery ==
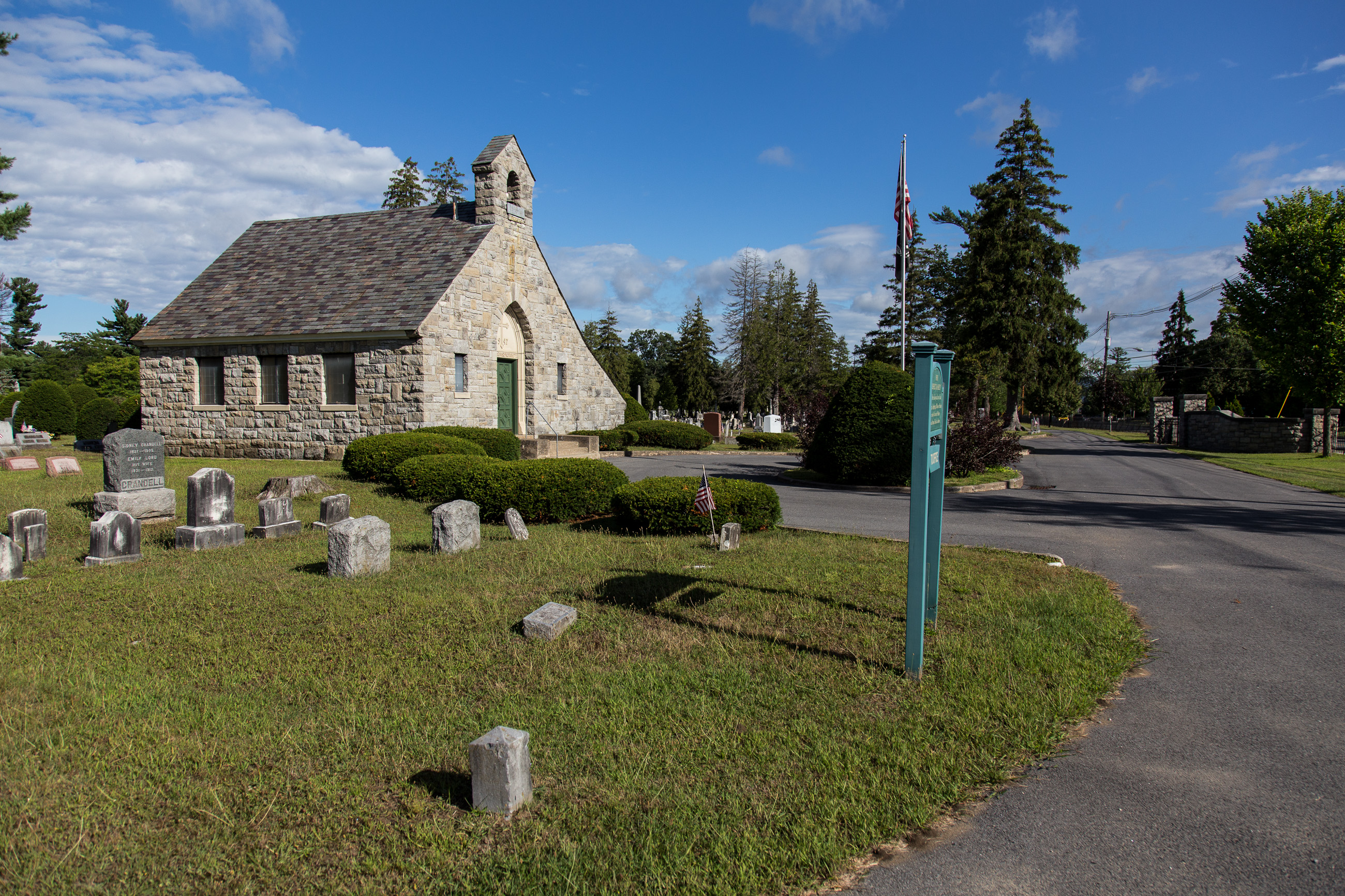
Another view of the chapel

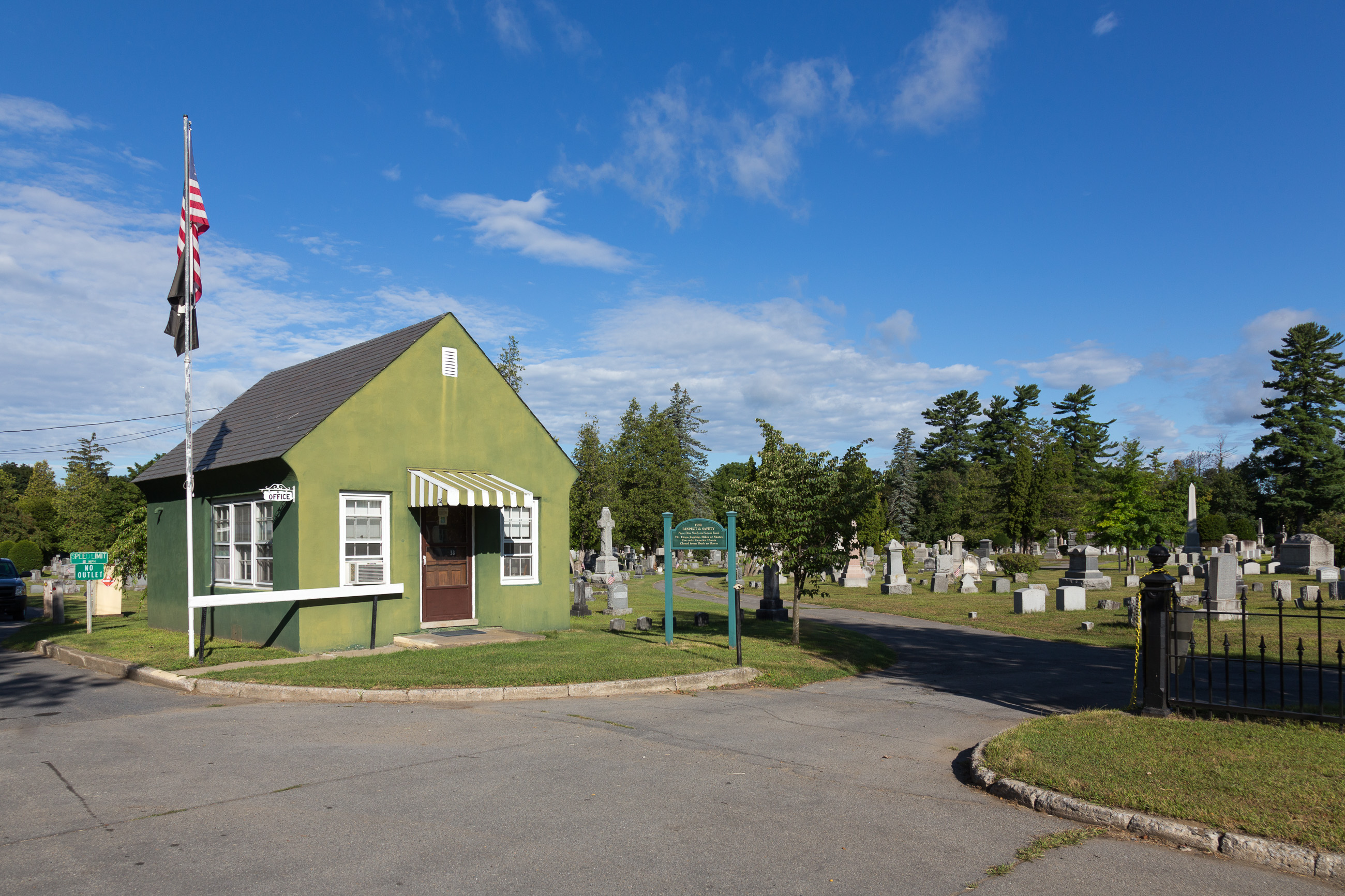
The cemetery office is at Hope Avenue and Ogden Street

== See also ==
- National Register of Historic Places listings in Warren County, New York
