= Nick De Ruiz =

American actor

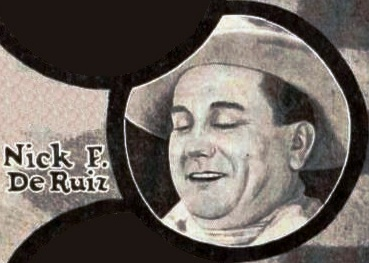
- Cropped from an advertisement for The Half Breed (1922)
- Born: Nicholas De Ruiz; February 1871; Santa Barbara, California
- Died: June 21, 1959 (aged 88); Los Angeles, California
- Occupation: Actor
- Years active: 1920–1938

Nicholas De Ruiz (February, 1871 – June 21, 1959) was an American actor. He appeared in 36 films between 1920 and 1938.

He was born in Santa Barbara, California and died in Los Angeles, California, aged 88.

== Selected filmography ==
Year	Film	Role	Notes
1921	Morals	Hamdi	
1922	The Altar Stairs	Rod McLean	
1922	Wolf Law	Samson Bender	
1923	The Hunchback of Notre Dame	Monsieur le Torteru	
1923	Bavu	Kuroff	
1923	Slave of Desire	Tallifer	Credited as Nicholas De Ruiz
1924	Forbidden Paradise	The General	
1925	His Supreme Moment	Mueva	
1925	The Man in Blue	Gregoria Vitti	
1925	Lord Jim	Sultan	
1926	The Girl from Montmartre	Don Angel	Credited as Nicholas De Ruiz
1926	Old Ironsides	The Bashaw	
1927	The Unknown	Antonio Zanzi	
1928	The Man Who Laughs		
1929	Rio Rita		
1930	Isle of Escape	Dolobe	
1934	Viva Villa		
