= George Merrill (Medal of Honor) =

- Born: February 11, 1847; Queensberry, New York
- Died: August 29, 1925 (aged 78); New York
- Burial place: Glens Falls Cemetery, Glens Falls, New York
- Military career
- Allegiance: United States of America; Union
- Branch: United States Army; Union Army
- Service years: 1864 - 1865
- Rank: Private
- Units: (New York (state)) Company I, 142nd New York Volunteer Infantry
- Conflicts: American Civil War • Second Battle of Fort Fisher
- Awards: Medal of Honor

George Merrill (February 11, 1847 – August 29, 1925) was a Union Army soldier during the American Civil War. He received the Medal of Honor for gallantry during the Second Battle of Fort Fisher on January 15, 1865.

== Military service ==
Merrill enlisted in the Army from Schenectady, New York in September 1864. He was assigned to Company I, 142nd New York Volunteer Infantry, mustering out with his regiment in June 1865.

On January 15, 1865, the North Carolina Confederate stronghold of Fort Fisher was taken by a combined Union storming party of sailors, marines, and soldiers under the command of Admiral David Dixon Porter and General Alfred Terry.

== Medal of Honor citation ==
For The President of the United States of America, in the name of Congress, takes pleasure in presenting the Medal of Honor to Private George Merrill, United States Army, for extraordinary heroism on 15 January 1865, while serving with Company I, 142d New York Infantry, in action at Fort Fisher, North Carolina. Private Merrill voluntarily advanced with the head of the column and cut down the palisading.

General Orders: Date of Issue: December 28, 1914

Action Date: January 15, 1865

Service: Army

Rank: Private

Company: Company I

Division: 142nd New York Infantry

== See also ==
- List of Medal of Honor recipients
- List of American Civil War Medal of Honor recipients: M–P
