= Zachariah C. Neahr =

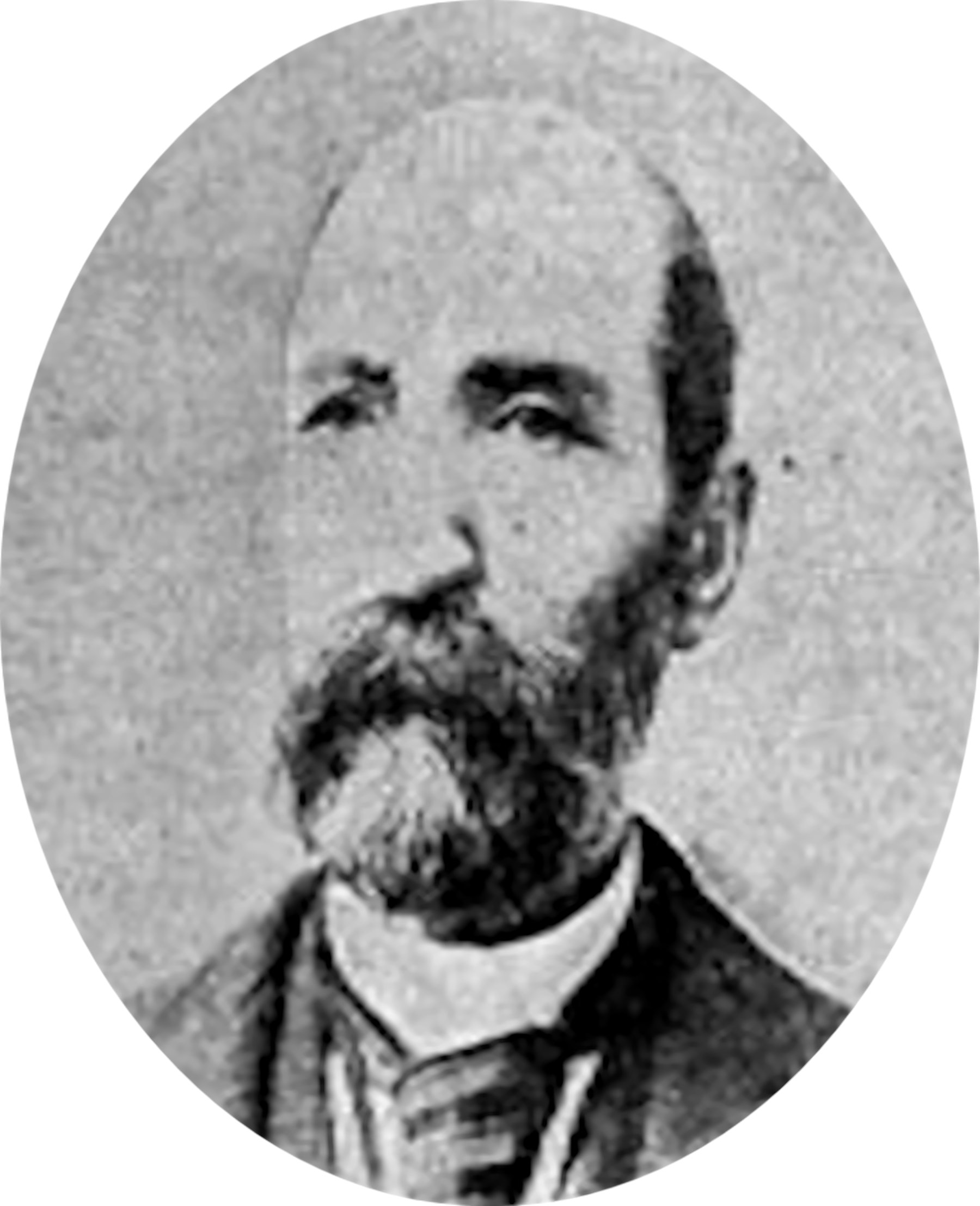
- Born: December 9, 1830; Palatine, New York, US
- Died: July 21, 1903 (aged 72); New York, US
- Burial place: Canajoharie Falls Cemetery, Canajoharie, New York
- Military career
- Allegiance: United States of America; Union
- Branch: United States Army; Union Army
- Service years: 1864 - 1865
- Rank: Private
- Units: (New York (state)) Company K, 142nd New York Volunteer Infantry
- Conflicts: American Civil War Second Battle of Fort Fisher
- Awards: Medal of Honor

Zachariah C. Neahr (December 9, 1830 – July 21, 1903) was a Union Army soldier during the American Civil War. He received the Medal of Honor for gallantry during the Second Battle of Fort Fisher on January 15, 1865.

== Military service ==
Neahr enlisted in the Army from Schenectady, New York in September 1864. He was assigned to Company K of the 142nd New York Volunteer Infantry, mustering out with his regiment in June 1865.

On January 15, 1865, the North Carolina Confederate stronghold of Fort Fisher was taken by a combined Union storming party of sailors, marines, and soldiers under the command of Admiral David Dixon Porter and General Alfred Terry.

== Medal of Honor citation ==
For The President of the United States of America, in the name of Congress, takes pleasure in presenting the Medal of Honor to Private Zachariah C. Neahr, United States Army, for extraordinary heroism on 16 January 1865, while serving with Company K, 142d New York Infantry, in action at Fort Fisher, North Carolina. Private Neahr voluntarily advanced with the head of the column and cut down the palisading.

General Orders: Date of Issue: September 11, 1890

Action Date: January 15, 1865

Service: Army

Rank: Private

Company: Company K

Division: 142nd New York Infantry

== See also ==
- List of Medal of Honor recipients
- List of American Civil War Medal of Honor recipients: M–P
- List of Medal of Honor recipients for the Second Battle of Fort Fisher
