= Target girl =

Female supported in knife throwing

Astrid Schollenberger rehearses with top knife thrower Rev Dr David Adamovich. One knife is captured in flight, fractions of a second before impact.

In circus and vaudeville acts, a target girl is a female assistant in "impalement" acts such as knife throwing, archery or sharpshooting. The assistant stands in front of a target board or is strapped to a moving board and the impalement artist throws knives or shoots projectiles so as to hit the board and miss the assistant. The image or character of the target girl has become an icon in fiction and visual media.

== Introduction ==
Although some assistants are male, there is no common equivalent term for a male assistant. This reflects the fact that, historically at least, female assistants have predominated in the acts in question. The presence of an assistant as a human target provides a powerful element of risk. Without assistants placing themselves in danger these acts would be simple demonstrations of accuracy, but with the potential for injury or death the show is much more dramatic. Target girls often wear revealing costumes, thus adding an element of overt sexuality to an act. In this respect there is some similarity to magicians' assistants, although there is a distinct difference in that any apparent danger to an assistant in a magic act is mostly an illusion, whereas impalement acts are demonstrations of accuracy, nerve and calculated risk and the danger is real. Various theories have been put forward to explain the enduring appeal of the target girl. These range from simple awe at the display of steely nerves and complete trust to more complex psychological and philosophical theories. While some point to overtones of sadomasochistic eroticism, others cite dramaturgical works and point to parallels with the story arc of the hero in classic drama. In particular the assistant's performance is said to mirror the plot device of the hero's ordeal, in which the hero proves his or her heroic qualities through self-sacrifice or by facing extreme peril. Jim Steinmeyer, a noted illusion designer who has written well-regarded books on the history of magic, has identified a fashion for female peril as entertainment in the post-First World War period. Steinmeyer has written that P. T. Selbit's stage debut of the Sawing Through A Woman illusion in 1921 marked the beginning of a trend for women as the victims of choice for acts simulating danger or torture. While Steinmeyer focuses on stage magic and attributes some of the trend to practical factors, he also points to a broader pattern in entertainment generally, which he links to social trends. He concludes that: "...beyond practical concerns, the image of the woman in peril became a specific fashion in entertainment". A further view on historical trends is provided by performer and blogger Ula the Painproof Rubbergirl, who has acted as a target girl for New York-based knife thrower The Great Throwdini. In an extensive article on her experiences and philosophical approach to the art she notes: "Knife throwing is an old act. So is high wire. And rodeo. And stone throwing, witch burning, beheading, Roman gladiators, jousting, dog fights, you name it - we, humans, love it. And we love a vulnerable woman. Isn't there something oddly attractive about the woman in danger? I remember seeing lots of soundless black and white movies with a girl tied to the railroad tracks or a girl tied to a sawmill by some evil perverted landlord."

== Notable target girls ==
Like magicians' assistants, target girls often receive little to no formal recognition or billing. The notable exception is for husband and wife acts, common in this field, where both performers are billed together. This hinders making a name for one's self specifically as a target girl, but it's not unusual for performers who are known for their overall careers to have served as target girls at one time or another.

- Elizabeth Collins is almost unique in having effectively ended up with top billing in the knife throwing act she formed with her husband Martin Collins. The couple met and married in their native Hungary at around the time of the outbreak of World War II and began performing together as "Elizabeth and Collins". For their signature stunt they developed an extremely demanding trick that involved Elizabeth spinning on a "wheel of death" target while her husband balanced on a tightrope and threw knives at her. After the war they settled in Britain and toured clubs and theatres around the world. They were one of the first impalement acts to break into television. Elizabeth retired from performing in the early 1960s and was replaced by their daughter who was also named Elizabeth (although additionally known as Agnes). Elizabeth and Collins performed on The Ed Sullivan Show three times and appeared as themselves in an episode of the 1960s spy series The Avengers.
- Helga and Sylvia Brumbach are a mother and daughter who have both been part of a family act that is regarded by many other artists as setting the standard in their field. The Brumbachs, also known as Los Alamos, began with Fritz Brumbach as a knife thrower and whip cracker and his wife Helga as target girl. Later daughter Sylvia joined the act as a second target girl and then son Patrick became a thrower. Fritz and Helga have since retired but Patrick and Sylvia continue the act. Fritz is a Guinness World Record holder for rapid throwing around a live target.
- Irene Stey married into an old established Swiss circus family when she wed Rolf Stey. The couple worked as a knife act called "Two Tornados" between 1965 and 1985 and are notable for being one of only two acts to repeat the combined "wheel of death" and tightrope stunt developed by Elizabeth and Collins. After retiring as a target girl Irene continued in the circus business with an equestrian act.
- Barbara Braun began performing with her husband Sylvester as the "Wizards of the West" in the early 1940s. Sixty years later the couple were honoured by the International Knifethrowers Hall of Fame with the "Knife Throwing Pioneer Award" and the title "Wild West Duo of the 20th Century".
- Montana Nell was the performing name of Pearl Collins who, between 1929 and 1950, toured with her husband Robert Collins in a western arts act under the billing of "Texas Slim and Montana Nell". She was born Pearl Miller and grew up on a farm, which helped her become a highly proficient horse rider. In 1923 she married a man called Seamor Russell with whom she had a daughter named Doris. Seamor died of an illness in 1925 and Pearl went on to marry Collins in 1929. When Doris was 16 she joined her parents' show as a trick rider and sharp shooter named "Little Miss Peggy". Pearl and Robert Collins were posthumously honoured by the International Knifethrowers Hall of Fame in 2006.
- Claude Chantal Blanc is an experienced Swiss aerial and tight wire artist who is unusual for working as part of an all-female knife throwing act named Risk Ladies. The thrower was Caroline Haerdi, who currently works in partnership with a male thrower named Arno Black; she as the thrower and he as the target.
- Tina Nagy Is a dancer and aerial artist who featured as a target girl in the 2007 season of the NBC television series America's Got Talent. Nagy, who is of Hungarian descent but grew up in Connecticut, performed with knife thrower The Great Throwdini. Her interest in the impalement arts began through working as a target girl for bullwhip artist Robert Dante. She has sought to produce a performance artform that combines dance and whip cracking.
- Ekaterina Sknarina is a model, actress, contortionist, aerial artist and former international gymnast. She was born in Russia and competed at world championship level for the Russian rhythmic gymnastics team. She later trained as an aerial artist with Cirque du Soleil. After re-locating to New York she began working as a contortionist in the burgeoning new burlesque scene. She also began working as a model and appeared in magazines including FHM, One World, and GQ. She added the role of target girl to her portfolio after meeting knife thrower The Great Throwdini. In 2005 she was one of the stars of the off-Broadway show Maximum Risk, during which she helped set two world records for the number of knives thrown around a human target in a minute. She was Miss Coney Island 2007. She appears in the movie Across the Universe (2007) and was featured in promotional posters for it.

=== Books by target girls ===
A very small and select group of women are notable for having used personal experience to write about the impalement arts from the point of view of the target girl. They include:

- Astrid Schollenberger a middle-aged German single mother with a master's degree in philosophy and a regular job who, at the suggestion of her boyfriend Dr Joachim Heil, volunteered as a target girl for knife thrower Dr David Adamovich (a.k.a. The Great Throwdini). Schollenberger worked with Adamovich for a show in New York in 2002 where he first publicly performed the "Wheel of death" stunt. Later Schollenberger, Adamovich and Heil wrote a book about the experience titled A Day on Broadway: The art of being a knife thrower's assistant.
- Ronnie Claire Edwards is an American actress born in 1933. She is best known for the role of "Corabeth Walton Godsey" in the series The Waltons (1972 - 1981). Her substantial and often quirky career is recalled in an autobiography titled The Knife Thrower's Assistant: Memoirs of a Human Target.
- Ula the Painproof Rubbergirl started as one half of a duo called The Painproof Rubbergirls who did contortion and various sideshow-type stunts, such as the Bed of nails. After her partner left for other work, Ula continued as a solo performer doing various aerial acts as well as a signature routine that involves contortion feats on a bed of swords. In 2003 she worked as a target girl for Dr David Adamovich (a.k.a. The Great Throwdini) and later wrote a lengthy article about the act and the philosophy behind her part in it. Ula was featured as a target girl in the US edition of FHM magazine in March 2006.

=== Celebrity target girls ===
A small group of target girls are notable for the fact that they are well known celebrities who performed the role for charitable purposes or other reasons apart from their main career. These are examples of the target girl, rather than the thrower, being the main individual in the act. The annual Circus of the Stars television special, made by CBS between 1977 and 1994, provided a number of examples. They include:

- Lynda Carter, the actress best known as television's Wonder Woman, appeared as a target girl on the very first Circus of the Stars in January 1977, with actor David Janssen throwing knives at her.
- Actress and model Ann Turkel performed the role of target girl for knife thrower Skeeter Vaughan in the second Circus of the Stars in December 1977.
- Charlene Tilton, the actress best known for her role in the television series Dallas, famously appeared in a gold bikini as a target girl for knife thrower Skeeter Vaughan in the 1979 Circus of the Stars.
- Sally Kellerman, the actress who played Major Margaret "Hot Lips" Houlihan in the film MASH, appeared as a target girl for knife thrower Larry Cisewski on the 1981 Circus of the Stars. She was seen holding balloons for Cisewski to burst and also braved being spun around on his "Devil's door" target board as he planted knives around her.
- Linda Blair, the actress who rose to fame as a child star in The Exorcist, appeared as a target girl for knife thrower Paul Lacross on Circus of the Stars in 1983.
- Actress Britt Ekland appeared as a target girl for knife thrower Fritz Brumbach on Circus of the Stars in 1986.
- Television presenter and actress Ursula von Manescul appeared as a target girl on the annual German charity circus show Stars in der Manege in 1967. She performed with a duo called The Williams Boys.
- Actress Simone Thomalla was a target girl for world-record breaking impalement artist Patrick Brumbach in the final edition of the German television charity show Stars in der Manege, recorded in December 2008. During the act she rode a rotating target board as Brumbach threw knives around her and she also held out targets for him to cut with a whip.

== Fictional and artistic representation ==
The mixture of peril, nerve and sexuality inherent in the idea of a target girl has proved attractive to writers, artists, moviemakers and television executives.

=== Movie and television ===
There are many instances of target girls as iconic or emblematic images in film and television. The most notable movie example is the character Adele portrayed by Vanessa Paradis in the film Girl on the Bridge (1999), in which the knife throwing act is at the centre of the plot and serves as a powerful erotic metaphor.

Other examples include:

- The fourth season of the television series Bones, featured an episode (first aired in 2009) in which title character Temperance "Bones" Brennan goes undercover as a target girl with Special Agent Seeley Booth as a knife-thrower.
- An interesting inversion can be found in the animated series Mobile Suit Gundam Wing, in which female knife-thrower Catherine Bloom uses a male assistant, Trowa Barton. Although several characters through the series express an admiration for Trowa's good looks, the costume he chooses to wear during performances has little to no sexual appeal—notably, half of his face is hidden by a mask. In contrast, Catherine's costume while performing as knife-thrower is more in line with the revealing and hypersexualized target girl image.
- Cameron Diaz's character Jenny Everdeane acts as a target girl in a scene in the film Gangs of New York (2002) which was used in promotional clips.
- In the television series Nikki, an episode aired in 2001 featured the characters played by Nikki Cox and Susan Egan taking jobs as target girls.
- The television play The Act (1987) revolved around a knife throwing act and a girl who applies for a job as the assistant. It was made for the BBC and was a co-production involving the Royal College of Art. It starred Caroline Embling and Bill Rourke. Real life knife thrower Jay Ruffley provided throwing skills in one scene and also appeared as the owner of a club.
- Courteney Cox's character in the 1987 television movie If It's Tuesday It Still Must Be Belgium becomes a target girl in a circus knife throwing act.
- In the movie Bronco Billy (1980), actresses Sondra Locke and Tessa Richarde are both seen as target girls for a sharpshooter and knife thrower played by Clint Eastwood. Locke's role in the act is central to the plot.
- In the television series Charlie's Angels, Cheryl Ladd's character Kris Munroe goes undercover as a target girl in an episode titled "Circus of Terror" (1977).
- The spy thriller Masquerade (1965) features Marisa Mell as a target girl named Sophie.
- Target girls were iconic figures in a series of horror films set in circuses that were made in the 1960s. These include:
  - Circus of Horrors (1960), in which Vanda Hudson played a target girl called Magda von Meck.
  - Circus of Fear (1966), which features British actress Margaret Lee as an assistant facing danger in a knife act.
  - Berserk! (1967), in which Judy Geeson played a target girl in a circus knife act.
- The film Phantom of the Rue Morgue (1954) has an early scene featuring one of the female leads as a target girl.
- In "Lucy Tells the Truth" (1953), an episode of the television series I Love Lucy, a white lie leads to Lucille Ball's character ending up as the assistant in a knife act.

=== Theatre ===
The play Pin Cushion, by Clay McLeod Chapman is based around a husband and wife knife throwing act and consists of the target girl delivering a monologue while her husband throws knives around her. It was performed as part of Chapman's Pumpkin Pie Show at The Red Room Theatre, New York, in May and June 2002. The performance involved a genuine knife throwing act, with actress Niabi Caldwell as the target girl and professional knife thrower Dr. David Adamovich (a.k.a. The Great Throwdini) playing her husband.

=== Photography ===
The target girl has also been used as an image in fashion and art photography. Examples include:

- Model Karen Elson is seen spinning on a "wheel of death" target in a picture by photographer Steven Meisel that formed part of a series titled "The Greatest Show on Earth" in the April 2007 issue of the Italian edition of Vogue magazine.
- Model Kate Moss appeared on a "wheel of death" target in two of a series of fashion photos by Mert Alas and Marcus Piggott in the April 2006 issue of W magazine.
- Actress Jennifer Ellison appeared strapped to a "wheel of death" target and surrounded by knives in the UK edition of Maxim magazine in 2005. The picture was reproduced in the Daily Star newspaper on 1 December 2005.
- Drummer Meg White appeared as a target girl on a "wheel of death" target in a photo of The White Stripes by Annie Leibovitz in 2003. The picture was part of a series that appeared in a book and an exhibition, both titled Annie Leibovitz: American Music.
- Singer and musician Shakira appeared standing against a target with knives around her in a photo in the April 2002 issue of FHM magazine (UK edition).
- Actress Goldie Hawn appeared in a circus costume strapped to a "wheel of death" target for a photoshoot in 1990 that was later featured in Rolling Stone magazine in 2001.

=== Literature ===
- Steven Millhauser's short story The Knife Thrower features a thrower who specialises in nicking those who stand at the target board for him, including his female assistant. It was published as part of a collection that bears the same title. At least one edition features as its cover a painting of a girl standing in front of a target board.
- The relationship between a target girl and a circus knifethrower is the central motif in the poem cycle Das Mädchen und der Messerwerfer published in 1997 by noted German poet Wolf Wondratschek.
- The novel Knives of Desire by Marion Zimmer Bradley (writing under the pen name Morgan Ives) is about a woman who becomes involved in a lesbian relationship after joining a circus to be the target girl for a female knife thrower. The cover of the original edition, published in 1966, shows two women in skimpy bikinis, one standing against a target board and the other throwing a knife.

=== Music ===
- Gretchen Peters uses the target girl as a central metaphor in her song Woman on the Wheel, which was debuted on her 2010 tour in support of her Circus Girl album. She later released a recorded version on her 2012 album Hello Cruel World.
- Tom Waits's song "Circus" from his 2004 album Real Gone features a knife throwing act as part of the eponymous travelling show.
- Alice in Chains uses a target girl in their 1994 I Stay Away music video as part of a circus act, where a knife thrower accidentally kills his target girl when flies distract him and throw off his aim.
- Slaughter uses a target girl on the album cover of their 1990 Stick It to Ya album. The debut album was infamous for featuring a photo of former Playboy playmate Laurie Carr wearing a swimsuit, strapped to a target board and surrounded by knives. The cover of a subsequent release, Stick It Live, featured an image apparently from the same shoot as the first but this time showing the target girl walking towards the target board hand-in-in-hand with a knife thrower.

== See also ==
- Impalement arts
- Magician's assistant
- Damsel in distress
