= Wheel of death (impalement arts) =

The Wheel of Death, in the context of the impalement arts, is a classic moving target stunt sometimes performed by knife throwers. The thrower's assistant or target girl is secured, (usually by the limbs and tied by rope), to a large, generally circular, target board that is free to spin about its center point. As the target rotates the thrower must execute a series of rapid, consistent and carefully timed throws to land knives on the segments of the wheel not covered by the assistant's body.

== History ==
Moving targets were an innovation used by European impalement artists in the 1930s. Husband and wife act The Gibsons, from Germany, have been credited with introducing the Wheel of Death into the US in 1938, when they featured in Ringling Bros, and Barnum & Bailey's shows at Madison Square Garden.

== Variations ==
There are variations in the exact configuration of "wheels": in some the assistant is positioned with their arms at their sides while in others the assistant is spreadeagled. Sometimes the "wheel" might not actually be circular: shield shapes and rectangular rotating boards have been known and all will work as "wheels" as long as they are correctly balanced to rotate smoothly when the assistant is in place.

The most challenging version is the Veiled Wheel, in which the target is covered with a paper screen so the thrower can't see the assistant. Only four artists are known to have attempted this dangerous stunt. It was first performed by The Gibsons in the 1930s; a duo named The Zeros followed them in the 1940s, Fritz Brumbach did it in Monte Carlo in 1978 and The Great Throwdini revived it in New York in October 2010 with hula hoop artist Melissa-Anne Ainley acting as his target girl.
