= Franklin Johndro =

Union Army Soldier in the American Civil War

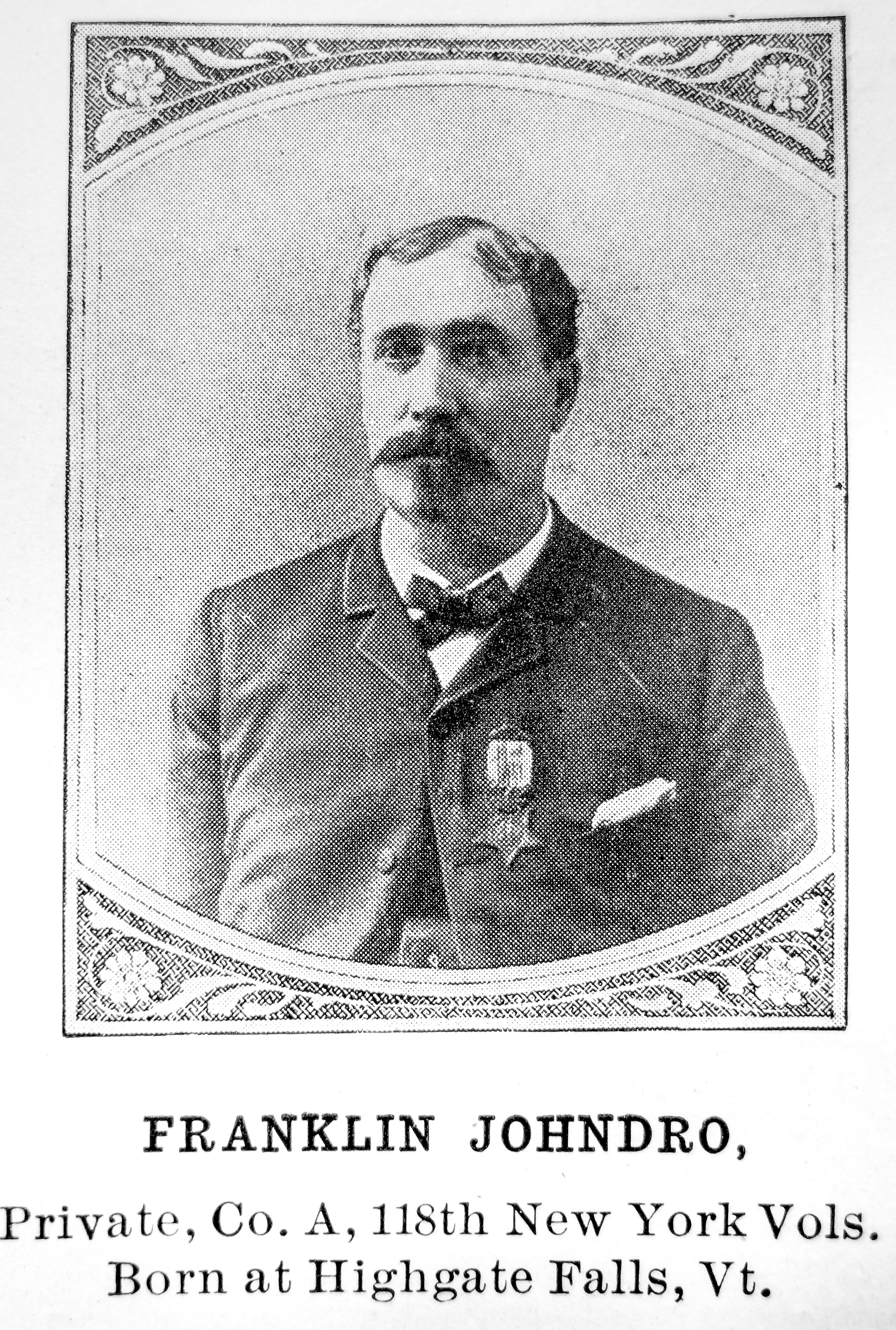
- Born: 1835; Highgate Falls, Vermont
- Died: April 5, 1901 (aged 65–66)
- Burial place: Glens Falls Cemetery, Glens Falls, New York
- Military career
- Allegiance: United States of America
- Branch: United States Army
- Rank: Private
- Units: (New York (state)) Company A, 118th New York Infantry
- Conflicts: American Civil War; Battle of Chaffin's Farm
- Awards: Medal of Honor

Franklin Johndro (1835 – April 5, 1901) was a Union Army soldier in the American Civil War who received the U.S. military's highest decoration, the Medal of Honor.

Johndro was born in Highgate Falls, Vermont, and entered service at Queensbury, in New York. He served as a Private with Company A, 118th New York Infantry.

== "Rounded up Forty Rebels" ==
Johndro was awarded the Medal of Honor, for extraordinary heroism shown in Henrico County, Virginia, for bravery in action during the Battle of Chaffin's Farm, on September 30, 1864.

At the order of Company A's captain, Johndro charged single-handedly against a group of Confederate soldiers who were stationed at the top of a slight hill. The Confederate soldiers were cut off from the larger Confederate army, and so were unable to retreat; yet, their position allowed them to hold back Union advances. With nothing more than a bayoneted rifle in hand, Johndro advanced against heavy fire and captured forty Confederates as prisoner.

His Medal of Honor was issued on April 6, 1865. At the ceremony, his colonel was recorded as saying: "Johndro, if I owned this Medal of Honor and had won it in the way you did, I should think more of it than I do of the eagles that I carry on my shoulders."

== Medal of Honor citation ==
The President of the United States of America, in the name of Congress, takes pleasure in presenting the Medal of Honor to Private Franklin Johndro, United States Army, for extraordinary heroism on 30 September 1864, while serving with Company A, 118th New York Infantry, in action at Chapin's Farm, Virginia, in the capture of 40 prisoners.

== Death and burial ==
Johndro died on April 5, 1901, and was buried at Glens Falls Cemetery in Glens Falls, New York.
