= Ellei Johndro =

American photographer

Ellei Johndro is an American photographer. Raised in Maine and establishing herself in Los Angeles, she is one of the first women to document the Los Angeles party scene following the likes of The Cobrasnake and Merlin Bronques. In 2007 the Los Angeles Times referenced her as the "new breed of club chronicler", comparing her to the New York nightlife photographers of the 1960s. She embarked on multiple US photographic tours illustrating parties, concerts, and other young nightlife from 2007 to 2009. She was featured as one of the Top People in Los Angeles in a 2009 LA Weekly article. Her photographs have been featured in films and TV series including, Punks Not Dead and VH1's Remaking Vanilla Ice. She has also worked as a photographer/blogger for Urban Outfitters. Featured on the cover of Forth Magazine in 2009, she was introduced as forefronting the "new weird" and maintains a relationship with The Standard hotels doing installations for their various establishments. She is now based out of Philadelphia.
