= Knife throwing =

Throwing of knives at targets for entertainment or sport

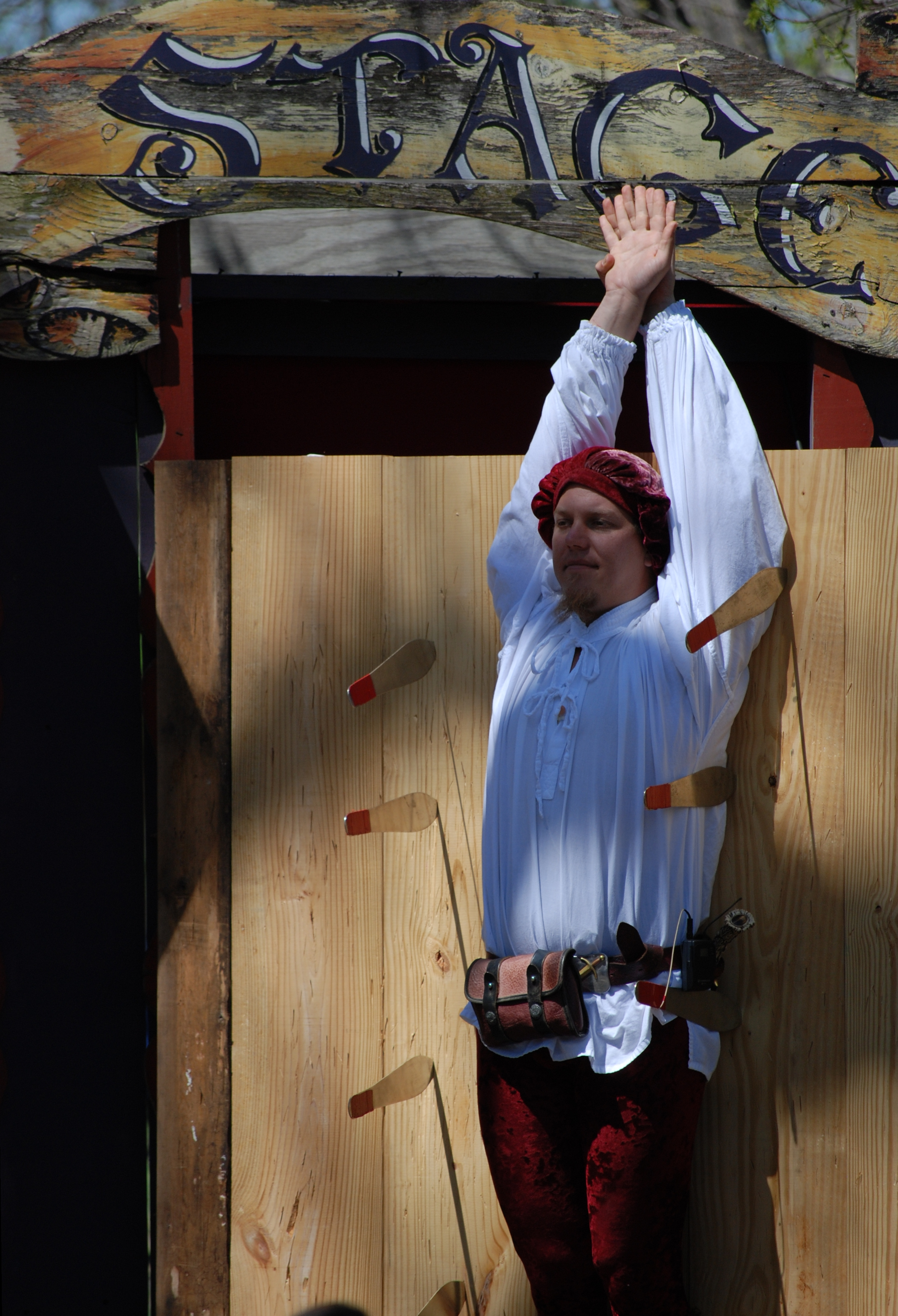
Knife throwing show

Knife throwing is an art, sport, combat skill, or variously an entertainment technique, involving an artist skilled in the art of throwing knives, the weapons thrown, and a target. In some stage performances, the knife thrower ties an assistant to the target (sometimes known as a "target girl") and throws to miss them.

== Basic principles ==
Knife throwing in every application involves the same basic principles of mechanics. The objective in each case is for the point to stick into the target with a sufficient amount of force. For this to be successful, accuracy, distance, number of rotations and placement of the body all must be taken into account.

The thrower may throw with spin; that is, throw so that the knife rotates parallel to the direction of the throw during flight. This means that the thrower, assuming they are throwing the same way every time, must either choose a specific distance for each type of throw or, more practically, make slight adjustments to the placement of the knife in the hand or to the throwing movement. The way the knife is gripped can also be adjusted: If it is gripped by the blade when it is thrown, it will complete an odd number of half-turns, whereas if it is gripped by the handle, it will complete some number of full turns. So, if the thrower estimates they need one and a half turns for the point to hit the target, they would grip the knife by the blade before throwing. If they feel they need two full turns for it to hit the target point-first, they would grip it by the handle.

With the no-spin throwing techniques, the throwing motion is made as linear as possible, the knife's rotation being slowed even more by an index finger on the spine during release. Thrown no-spin, knives will make no revolution or only a quarter spin before reaching the target (point first), but no-spin throws are not as accurate or stable in flight as spin techniques.

The knife does not need to be sharp to stick; as long as it has a point, it will stick into the target.

== Sport ==
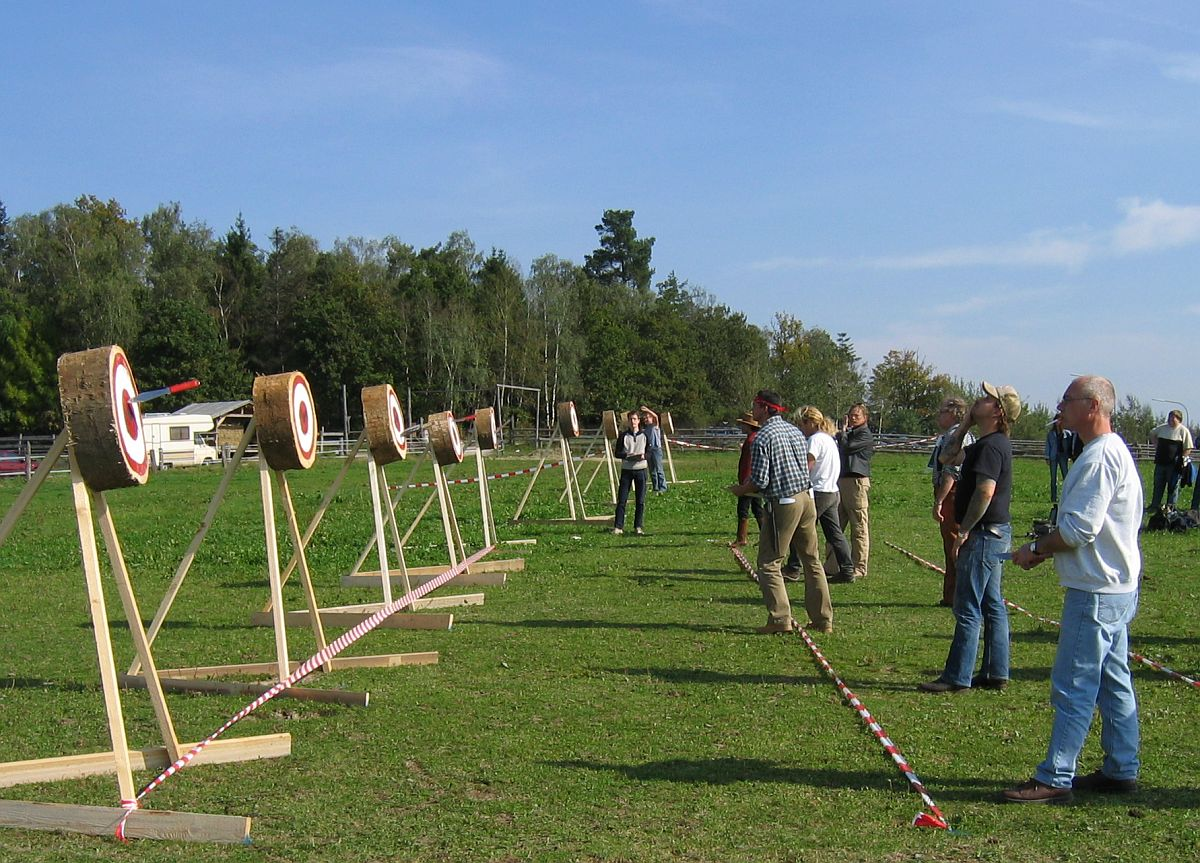
Knife throwing competition

In the US and in many European countries, there are communities of people pursuing knife throwing as a sport, similar to archery. For example, in Europe more than 30 knife throwing clubs exist. The clubs are usually set up in a not-for-profit form and are run by sports enthusiasts.

The outdoor competition itself consists, in the most common form, of a series of straight throws aimed at a set of standard wooden targets or in some cases foam. Similar to an archery target, competition knife throwing targets have a bullseye surrounded by one or more rings. A sticking knife scores points. The thrower must be standing at least a set distance away from the target, with higher distances for more challenging events. The International Knife Throwers Hall of Fame (IKTHOF) keeps a ranking of its members based on their performance during these sponsored competitions. EuroThrowers maintains a register of the world records, and for each championship publishes the full scores together with the meetings' reports.

=== Urban Knife Throwing ===
Urban Knife throwing is an indoor activity, with dedicated facilities providing lanes for rent. Like bowling, the focus is primarily recreational.

Spreading from Canada to the US, the venues usually operate within a commercial franchise system such as the World Knife Throwing League (WKTL). Knife throwing venues regularly also offer urban axe throwing activities. The rulesets differ from the outdoor events of the sports throwing clubs, for accessibility and safety reasons.

== History ==
As a performance art, knife throwing was popularized in the US in the late 19th century by traveling acts such as the Barnum & Bailey Circus, but has its roots in martial arts and hunting applications. It has been incorporated into the martial disciplines of the Japanese as well as African and Native American tribes. In Central Africa, they were used as weapons of war (thrown horizontally) as well as for ceremonial purposes. In medieval Europe Hans Talhoffer (c. 1410-1415 – after 1482) and Paulus Hector Mair (1517–1579) both mention throwing daggers in their treaties on combat and weapons. Talhoffer specifies a type of spiked dagger for throwing while Mair describes throwing the dagger at an opponent's chest.

== Representations ==
The opera Queen of Knives, which premiered in Portland, Oregon on May 7, 2010, tells the story of a brother and sister knife throwing act in the midst of the student protests in Birmingham, Alabama in the early 1960s.

== See also ==
- Axe throwing
- Dart throwing
- Impalement arts

== Sources ==
- Collins, Blackie. Knife Throwing-Sport – Survival – Defense. Knife World Publications, 1978. (ISBN 0-940362-03-1)
- Echanis, Michael D. Knife Fighting: Knife Throwing for Combat. Ohara Publications, 1978. (ISBN 0-8975-0058-X)
- Führer, Dieter Guide to Knife & Axe Throwing. Schiffer Publishing, 2014. (ISBN 9780764347795)
- Hibben, Gil. The Complete Gil Hibben Knife Throwing Guide. United Cutlery Corp., 1994. (ASIN-B0006FAV9E)
- Madden, James W. The Art of Throwing Weapons. Patrick Publications, 1991. (ISBN 0-9628825-3-4)
- McEvoy, Harry K. Knife Throwing: A Practical Guide. Charles E. Tuttle Company, Inc., 1973. (ISBN 0-8048-1099-0)
- McEvoy, Harry K. Knife and Tomahawk Throwing. Knife World Publications, 1985. (ISBN 0-940362-10-4)
- McEvoy, Harry K. Knife & Tomahawk Throwing-Art of the Experts. Charles E. Tuttle Company, Inc., 1988. (ISBN 0-8048-1542-9)
- Moeller, Harald. Knifethrowing: The Viper Story. Lynclif Publishing, 1988. (ISBN 0-921444-00-1)
