= Reference marker =

Type of highway sign in New York, US

A representation of a reference marker found on NY 940U

In New York, a reference marker is a small green sign mounted approximately every one-tenth mile on highways maintained by the New York State Department of Transportation. This was initiated in response to the Highway Safety Act of 1966 enacted by Congress, in an effort to monitor traffic and identify high-accident locations. New York's system inventories and indexes all touring and reference routes, in addition to service and rest areas, ramps, and reservation roads.

New York's system is similar to California's postmile system in maintaining the state's highways and route logs. The New York State Thruway Authority adopted its own reference system for the New York State Thruway system, including I-287. There is a similar reference marker system in use in neighboring Vermont.

== Description ==
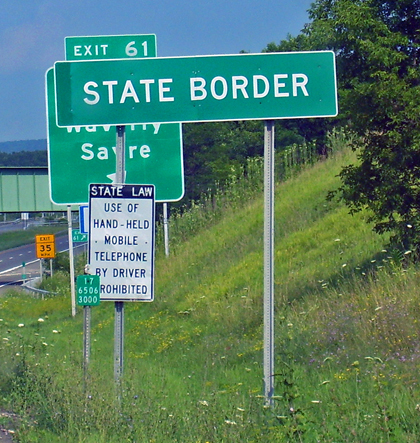
A reference marker on NY 17 (the small square sign in the lower left corner of the photo).

The reference markers (popularly referred to as "little green signs", or "tenth-mile markers") are typically-green signs that measure 8 inches (200 mm) wide by 10 inches (252 mm) high and are placed every 528 feet (161 m) on state roads, freeways, and parkways. There are three rows of white numbers.

=== Top row ===
The top row indicates the route number. The letter "I" is used as a suffix for an interstate highway but may instead be a prefix on some markers. If a route is re-numbered, it will retain its old route marker (such as the Watervliet segment of NY 2, which was formerly NY 7 until the mid-1980s). If a route number does not use all four digit spaces, there will be blank areas.

When two or more routes run concurrently or overlap, typically only the lower number highway will be present, while in some cases, a higher level highway's number appears instead, such as "88I" appearing on markers where NY 28 overlaps Interstate 88 near Oneonta.

=== Center row ===
The first digit of the second row indicates the NYSDOT Region (1 through 11, with Region 10 (Long Island) marked by a "0" and Region 11 (New York City) marked with an "X"). Within each of the regions, the counties are listed alphabetically and represented by the second digit. Thus, markers in Oswego County bear the designation of "34" (Region 3, County 4 within said region).

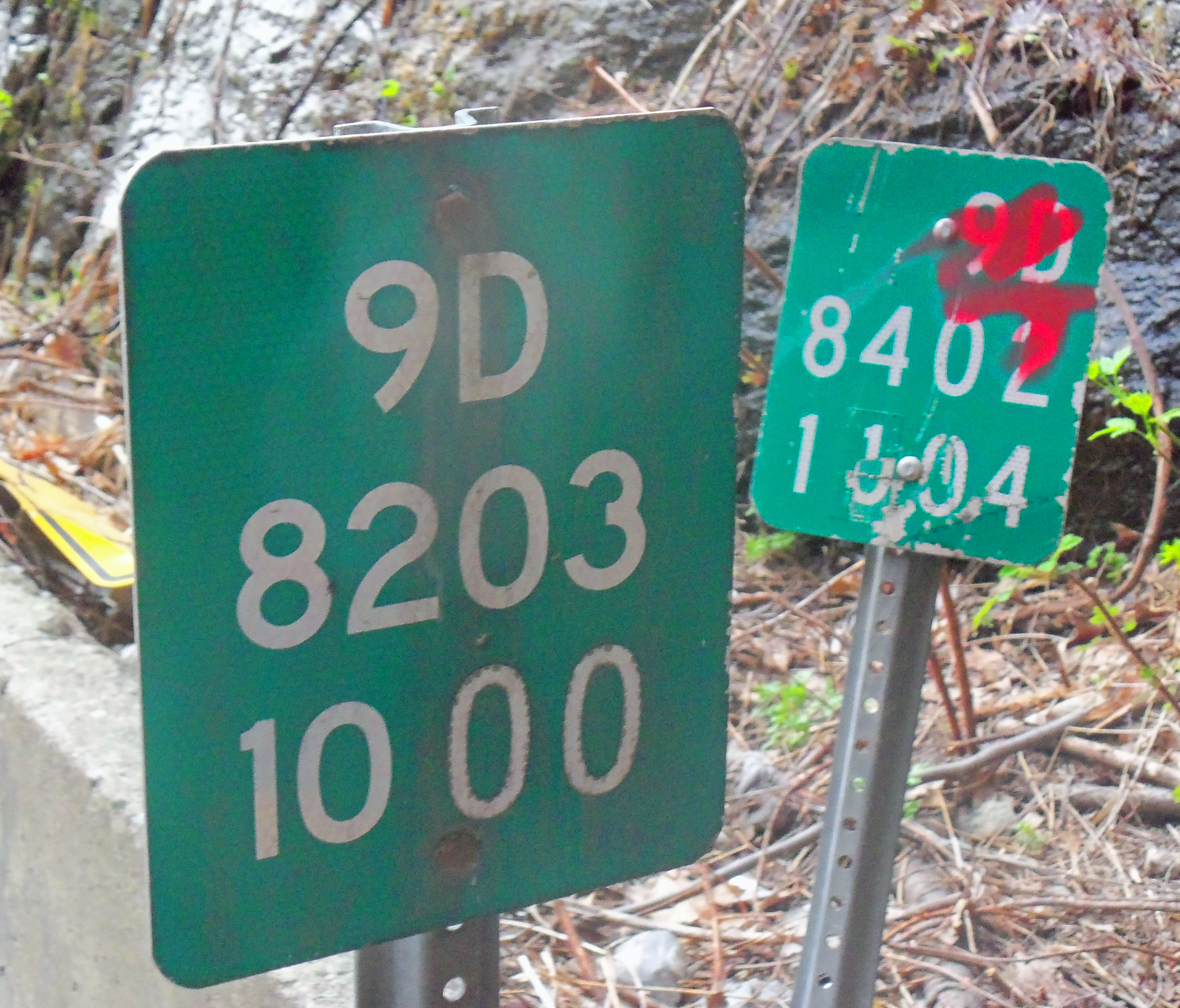
A rare pair of reference markers at a county line (Dutchess (left) and Putnam, on NY 9D), making the meaning of the numbers on the marker clearer

Outside of New York City, the third and fourth digits of the second row indicate the number of counties the route has entered, starting at "01". Each county line crossing, no matter how short nor if re-entered, is counted. For example, the irregular boundaries of the counties of Oneida, Herkimer, and Otsego, and the routing of US 20 through where the three counties meet, cause it to have four county crossings between Bridgewater and West Winfield, over a stretch of only 3.1 miles (5.0 km). This includes its first entry into Herkimer Country for roughly 170 feet (52 m). US 20 enters Herkimer and Otsego counties three times each before entering Schoharie County, which is number 18 in a sequence of 22 counties the route enters. The direction of inventory is either south-to-north, or west-to-east, as appropriate.

Within New York City, a different legend is applied for the third digit. The letter "M" for Mainline or "C" for Collector/Distributor road is used, while the letter "R" appears for some ramps. The fourth digit is still used for counting county crossings starting with “1” instead of “01”.

=== Bottom row ===
The first digit of the bottom row is the control segment, which starts at 1 at the county line or route's terminus. Control segments usually increment at each crossing of a city line, returning to 1 at the next county line. If a city has a high- and low-tax boundary, or otherwise annexes additional land, the control segments will in practice increment at the high tax (inner) boundary, or at the former boundary, rather than be re-numbered by NYSDOT if city boundaries change. If there are more than nine control segments in a county (such as on the Hutchinson River Parkway in Westchester County), the county counter will increment by one and the control segments reset to one. However, an entire county may be a single control segment; NY 10 enters no cities and all control segments are numbered "1", despite its length.

In New York City, however, the first digit of the bottom row indicates the direction of travel, since county lines are crossed yet the route is still in the same city. North, South, East and West are represented respectively by 1, 2, 3, and 4.

The last three digits of the bottom row represent approximate distance in tenths of a mile from the beginning of the last control segment or county line.

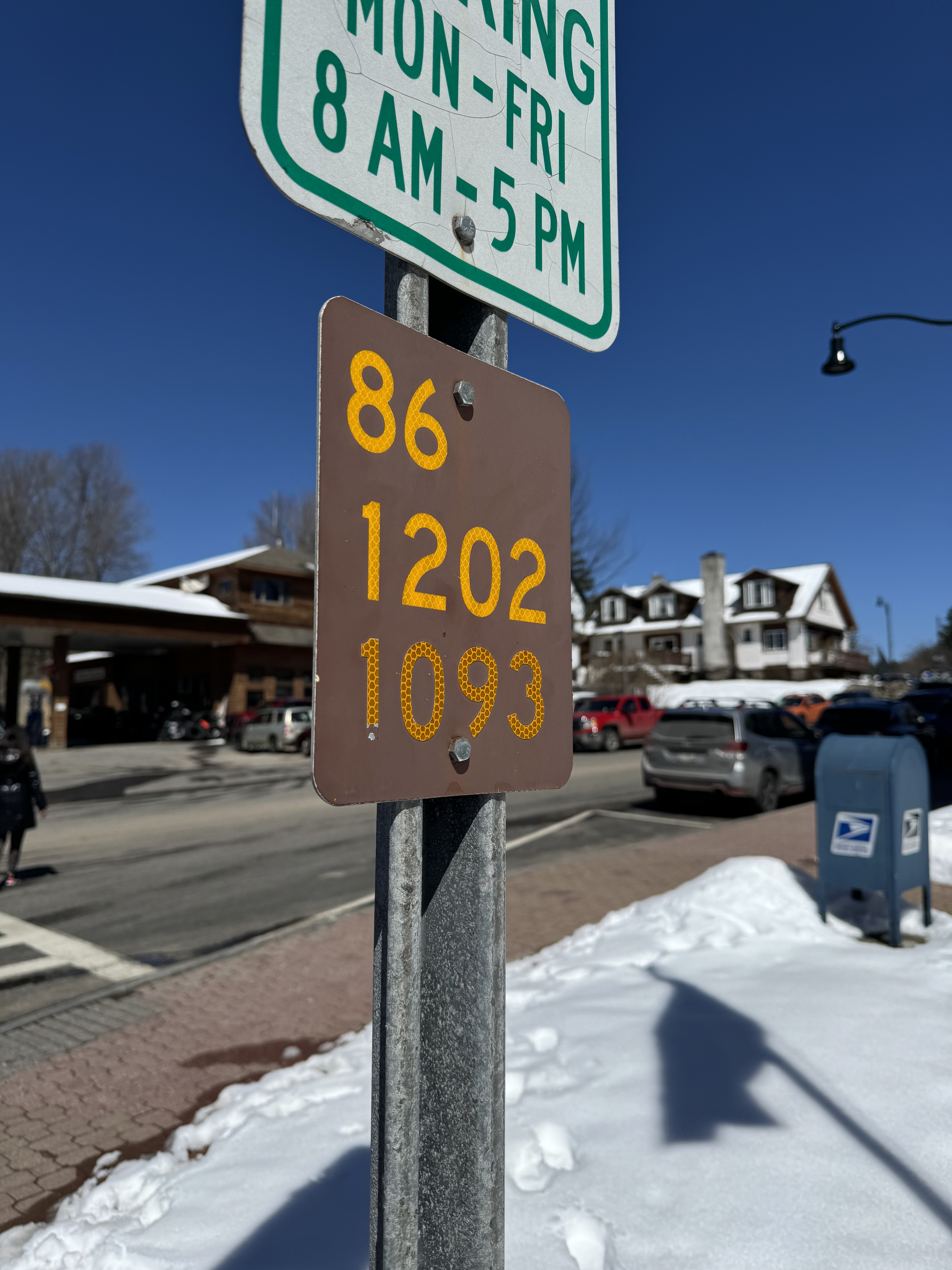
Reference marker for NY 86 with a brown background instead of the usual green, in Lake Placid. This style is common in the Adirondack and Catskill Parks.

== Marker placement ==
Markers are placed on flanged posts at approximate one-tenth mile intervals with a tolerance of ±0.01 mile. On two-lane roads, they are usually placed in alternate directions of travel. On four-lane roads, they are placed in both directions. If an intersection, impermeable material, or other obstruction exists, a marker may be placed nearby but in violation of the above tolerance, on the opposite side of the road on which it would otherwise be placed, or missing altogether. A missing marker is yet accounted for in the overall sequence.

A marker may also be placed on a nearby post that holds other warning or informational signs, or mounted on a bridge railing, guard rail, or other structure. Under the Latham traffic circle, markers for US 9 are mounted to the retaining wall.

A marker may be lost or disfigured due to a vehicle accident, maintenance/construction, snowplowing, or vandalism/theft. Markers are not present on roads not maintained by NYSDOT, which include city streets marked as a touring route, or bridges and ramps maintained by the New York State Bridge Authority or other agency.

== Other circumstances ==
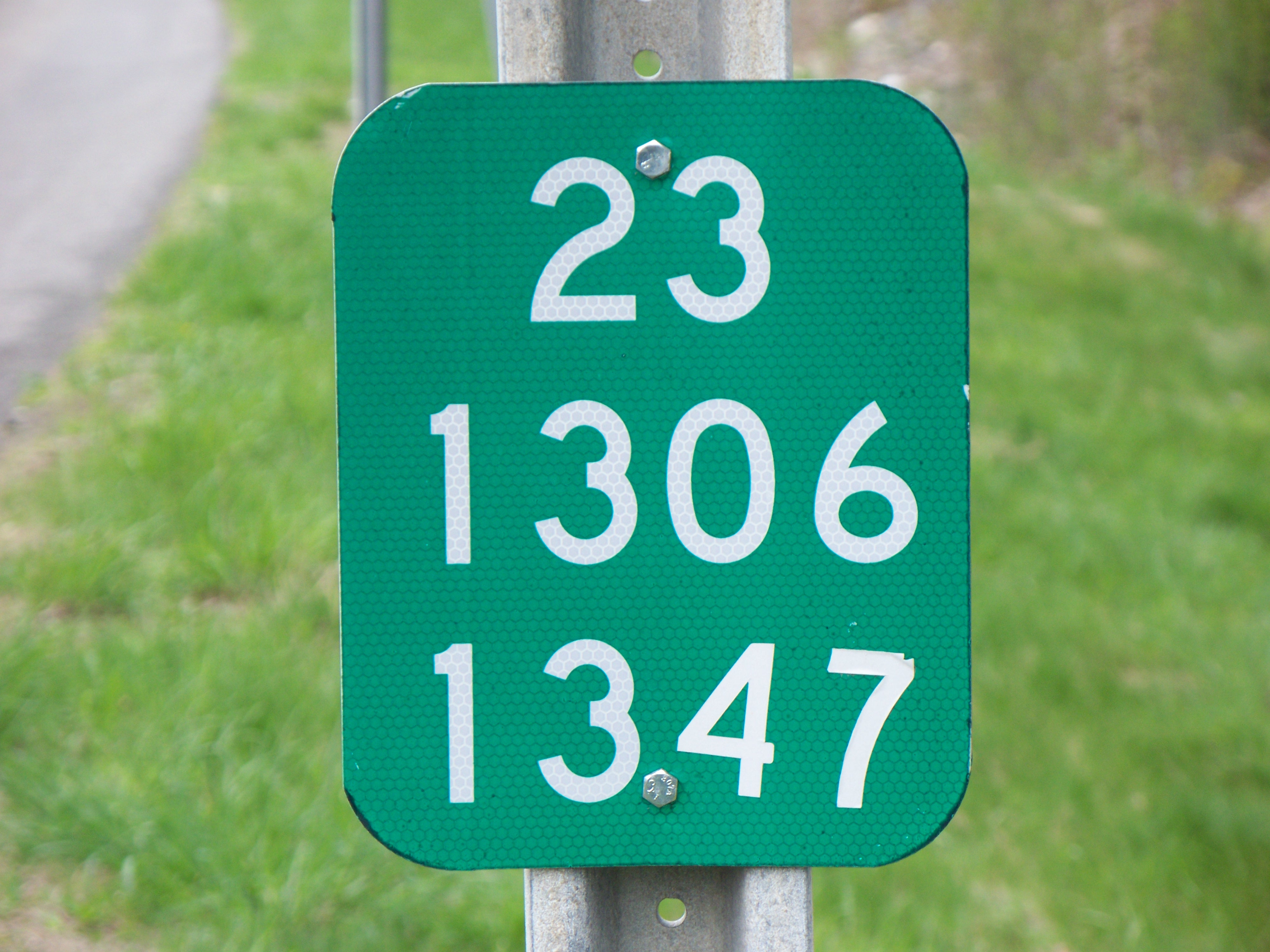
A reference marker on NY 23 matching a sample marker used on many New York commercial maps illustrating their presence

Special situations call for the use of different legends in the digits of a marker.

=== One-way couplets ===
When a route is split onto two city streets, each one-way for the specific direction of travel, the northbound or eastbound markers are unchanged. Southbound or westbound, however, the letter "V" is inserted for the second digit of the third row. The markers are numbered in reverse sequence, so that the numbers match at the southern or western point of split and may be longer or shorter if a different distance is needed for the other direction. For example, both NY 5 and NY 30 in Amsterdam are split: NY 5 is on Main Street westbound and the Amsterdam Arterial, eastbound; NY 30 is on Market Street southbound and Church Street, northbound. Both the southbound and westbound segments of both routes, maintained by NYSDOT, carry the "V" designation.

=== Interchange ramps ===
When markers are placed on access ramps, if the ramp carries a route, then that ramp's markers are part of the overall sequence. For ramps between two highways, the markers indicate the highway just departed (or the highway about to be entered, if the departed highway is not numbered). On the second row, instead of a county order, an exit order from "01" is present. This sequence is taken from the exit number of the higher level route (Interstate, over US Highway, over State Highway), and if the same level, the route with the lower number, from south to north or west to east. All markers for the same interchange will use the same sequencing number. If the ramp is for a service area, the sequencing number will use the format of "A1" through "Z9", but the letters "O" and "R" are not used.

On the third row, the first digit is a DOT Residency (further division of a Region). The second is the letter "A" through "M", ordered counterclockwise starting with the higher level route's ramp oriented west–east or south–north, and is subject to interpretation. The last two digits are sequencing numbers, similar to the distance on a regular marker.

=== Service roads ===
On Service roads, the first row is the same as the mainline route with which the service road is associated, and uses the same second row. The third row begins with the aforementioned DOT Residency, followed by the letters N through Z, sequenced through the same county. The last two digits are the same sequencing number; if they exceed 9.9 miles (15.9 km), then the preceding letter will be incremented.

=== Rest areas ===
Rest areas are used the same as ramps, but the county sequence will be replaced by the combination "R1" through "R9".

=== Institutional roads (including Indian reservations) ===
A special route number is given to these roads, beginning with "9", then the digit for the region number ("0" in New York City), the number "1", then a letter. Reservation routes will begin the same way, with the third digit being any other than zero, and ending with the letter "R". The second row will have the same county designation, with the third and fourth digits being a sequence the same as a service road. The third row will begin with: 1, Reservations or Department of Health; 2, Military and Naval Affairs; 3, Education; 4, State Police; 5, Executive-Youth; 6, Conservation; 7, Corrections; 8, Social Services; 9, Mental Hygiene; O, Other.

=== Realignments ===
If a new routing of a highway is constructed that is significantly different from the existing route, the legend will be varied to avoid duplication.

If a new county is entered, the next available county order number will be used. For example, NY 3 originally began at NY 104 in Hannibal in Oswego County. Ending in Plattsburgh, the county order ended with 08. Later, NY 3 was extended to the west at NY 104A. With this extension entering Cayuga County, that segment used the county sequence of 09, even though it was to the west of Oswego County's 01.

If a realignment would require the use of new sequencing numbers, the first sequencing number (second digit) is increased by one, and the last two digits either start at 00 or at one higher than the end of the existing routing. Examples include the bypass of NY 43 in Rensselaer County, replacing existing routing in and around Rensselaer; the construction of "Alternate 7" (NY 7 between I-87 and I-787 in Albany County), and the aforementioned NY 3 between the Cayuga County line and its former terminus at NY 104.

In the event that the second digit in the third row increments beyond 9, the control segment number will be incremented by one. The control segment will also increment for a discontinuous route in the same county, such as NY 24 in Suffolk County, as well for any crossings of the state line, such as NY 17 (future I-86) when the highway was re-routed around Waverly and into Pennsylvania (see photo above).

== History ==
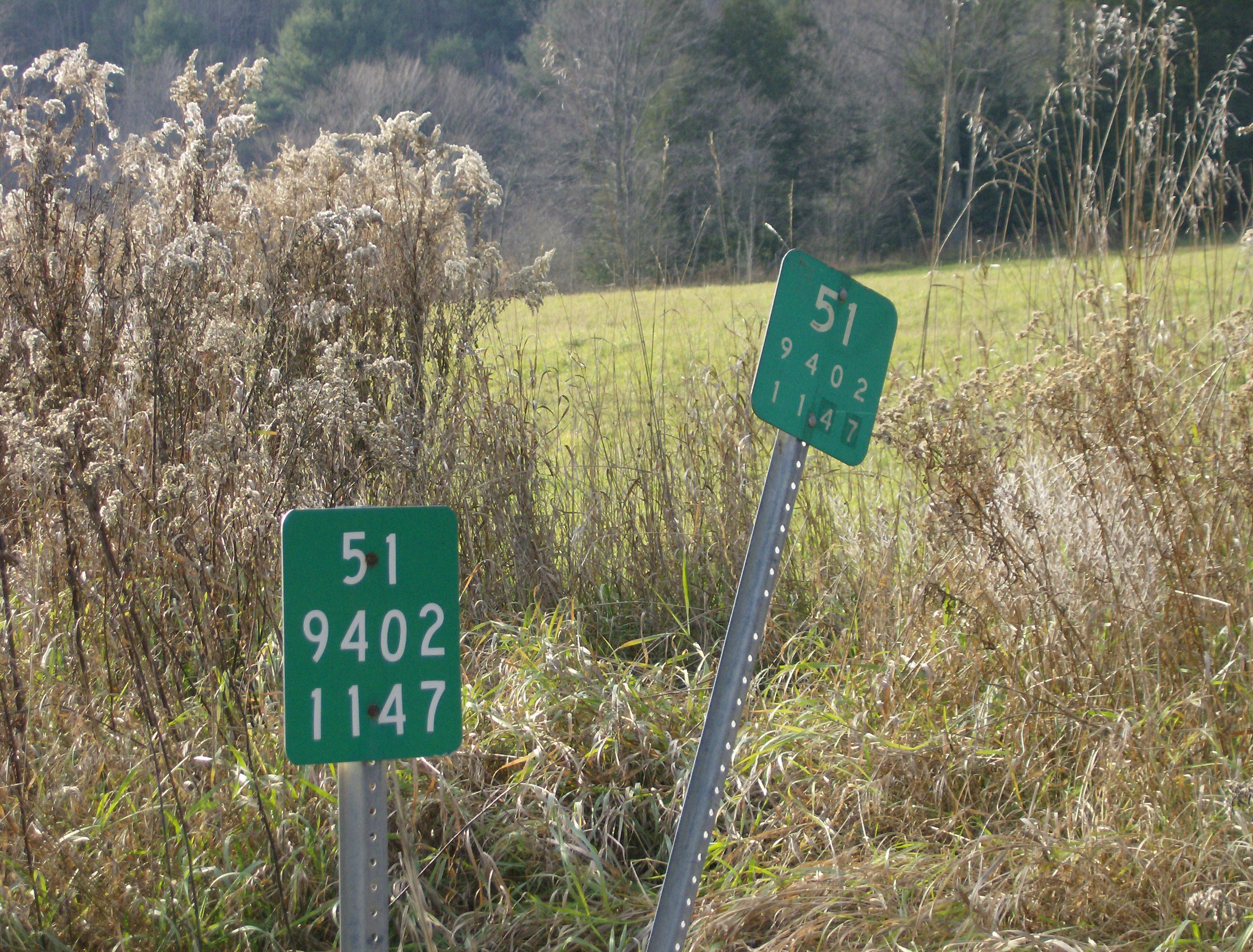
Old and new style reference markers on NY 51 in Otsego County between Morris and New Lisbon

Originally, reference markers were on square 8-inch (200 mm) signs and the numbers were not reflective. The second and third rows had much smaller digits. In many areas of the state, older markers are still present or are used in combination with newer, reflective ones.

In an oddity, the former NY 57 still retains many of its reference markers (in the old style) well after its decommissioning in 1980. This is also the case for former NY 380 in Chautauqua County.

== See also ==
- California postmile
- New York State Reference Routes
