= Texas U-turn =

Type of road junction

A diagram of a Texas U-turn, also known as a Texas turnaround (this one with the local road over the limited-access highway)

A Texas U-turn, or Texas turnaround, boomerang, or loop around, is a lane allowing cars traveling on one side of a one-way frontage road to U-turn onto the opposite frontage road (typically crossing over or under a freeway or expressway). Typically controlled by yield signs, these allow U-turning traffic to bypass two traffic signals and avoid crossing the local traffic twice.

If the limited-access highway passes over the local road, the bridge (or bridges) must be longer, to span four directions of traffic and two sidewalks below. If the local road passes over the limited-access highway, the bridge must be wider, to carry four directions of traffic and two sidewalks over the highway.

== Usage ==
Texas U-turns in the United States:

- This highway configuration originated (and is particularly common) in the U.S. state of Texas, especially in the Austin, Dallas–Fort Worth, El Paso, Houston, and San Antonio metropolitan areas.
- A variant is used in Michigan, notably along I-96 and I-696 in suburban Detroit, where frontage roads ("service drives") run parallel with the freeway. However, in this case, U-turning traffic usually goes past the cross street, then makes the turn, then crosses the cross street again. This is effectively the freeway implementation of a Michigan left.
- In California, Texas U-turns can be found along these four sections of highways:

- In Bakersfield, California State Route 178 has a Texas U-turn along Niles Street (serving as a westbound frontage road) for the freeway. Westbound traffic can u-turn under the freeway at Union Avenue to transition onto the eastbound frontage road, Monterey Street.
- On Terminal Island in Long Beach, a Texas U-turn is used for traffic on westbound Ocean Boulevard (before the Terminal Island Freeway, SR 47) wanting to access the eastbound Long Beach International Gateway (northbound I-710). The new Texas U-turn (which opened in July 2019) is part of the project to replace the Gerald Desmond Bridge.
- In downtown Los Angeles, Interstate 10 (Santa Monica Freeway) has a Texas U-turn along East 17th Street (serving as an eastbound frontage road). Exiting eastbound traffic can u-turn under the freeway to access San Pedro Street before Griffith Avenue.
- In Santa Ana, a Texas U-turn is used for northbound Interstate 5 traffic exiting onto First Street via Mabury Street.

- In Lynnfield, Massachusetts, a northeast suburb of Boston, the Northeast Expressway (Route 1) has a frontage road carrying traffic bound for Route 129. At the intersection of the frontage road and Route 129, a Texas U-turn allows for traffic to access the opposite side of Route 1.
- An unusual hybrid example of a Texas U-turn once existed at the Latham Circle, located in the hamlet of Latham, New York. Here, US Route 9 travels north-south underneath a roundabout carrying NY Route 2 east-west. In this case, the frontage roads are really the ramps which allow traffic from US Route 9 to connect to NY Route 2. These ramps were connected to two Texas U-turn ramps, since removed, which let motorists exiting adjacent businesses to travel in the opposite direction, and onto US Route 9.
- There is a Texas U-turn in the Bronx, New York City at Rosedale Avenue by the Cross Bronx Expressway (I-95) at exit 4B for motorists heading north on the Cross Bronx to turn and head back south or to connect to the northbound Bronx River Parkway without accessing Rosedale Avenue. This is due to the nearby I-895 and East 177th Street not having direct connections to the Bronx River Parkway, which is also nearby.
- In Queens, New York City, there is a Texas U-turn at I-678 near northbound exit 14 (Linden Place). This is so motorists can get to the nearby shopping center located to the west of I-678.
- Texas U-turns can also be found in Huntsville, Alabama; Peoria, Arizona; Little Rock and North Little Rock, Arkansas; Clearwater, Fort Lauderdale, Tampa and Jacksonville, Florida; Atlanta, Georgia; Chicago, Illinois; Wichita, Kansas; Lake Charles, Louisiana; Jackson, Mississippi; Kansas City and St. Louis, Missouri; Las Cruces, New Mexico; Cleveland, Ohio; Oklahoma City and Tulsa, Oklahoma; Lancaster, Pennsylvania; and Lehi and Provo, Utah.

Texas U-turns in other areas of the world:

- In Sydney, Australia, Texas U-turns are located at the junction between the Pacific Highway, Ryde Road & Mona Vale Road in Pymble.
- In Manama, Bahrain, Texas U-turns are found along Shaikh Isa bin Salman highway.
- In Edmonton, Alberta, Canada, examples can be found along the Yellowhead Trail.
- In Nanjing, China, Texas U-turns are common along the Inner Ring Road.
- In Kuwait City, Kuwait, Texas U-turns are common.
- In Muscat, Oman, two Texas U-turns are located on Sultan Qaboos St in Al-Badi.
- In Doha, Qatar, several Texas U-turns are found on the Salwa Highway and in Al Rayyan on Al Rayyan Al Jadeed Street.
- In Saudi Arabia, Texas U-turns are common throughout the entire highway system, especially in Riyadh.
- In Birmingham, United Kingdom, an example can be found on the Queensway outside St Chad's Cathedral.
- In London, United Kingdom, examples can be found beneath the Hammersmith flyover and also at the Hanger Lane gyratory.

== See also ==
- Overpass
- Turnaround (road)
