= NY-2 =

NY-2 may refer to:

- Consolidated NY-2, an aircraft
- New York's 2nd congressional district
- New York State Route 2

== See also ==
- New York State Route 2 (disambiguation)
