= List of places in New York: Q =

This list of current cities, towns, unincorporated communities, counties, and other recognized places in the U.S. state of New York also includes information on the number and names of counties in which the place lies, and its lower and upper zip code bounds, if applicable.

List of places in New York: A | B | C | D | E | F | G | H | I | J | K | L | M | N | O | P | Q | R | S | T | U | V | W | X | Y | Z

Name of place	Counties	Principal county	Lower zip code	Upper zip code
Quackenbush Hill	1	Steuben County	14830	
Quackenkill	1	Rensselaer County	12052	
Quail	1	Albany County	12206	
Quaker Basin	1	Madison County	13052	
Quaker Hill	1	Dutchess County	12564	
Quaker Ridge	1	Westchester County		
Quaker Settlement	1	Madison County		
Quaker Springs	1	Saratoga County	12871	
Quaker Street	1	Schenectady County	12141	
Quality Hill	1	Madison County		
Quarry Heights	1	Westchester County	10603	
Quarryville	1	Ulster County	12477	
Queechy	1	Columbia County	12029	
Queens	1	Queens County		
Queensbridge	1	Queens County	11101	
Queensbury	1	Warren County	12801	04
Queens Village	1	Queens County	11428	
Quigley Park	1	Chautauqua County	14710	
Quinneville	2	Broome County	13746	
Quinneville	2	Chenango County	13746	
Quioque	1	Suffolk County	11978	
Quogue	1	Suffolk County	11959	
