= New York Wing Civil Air Patrol =

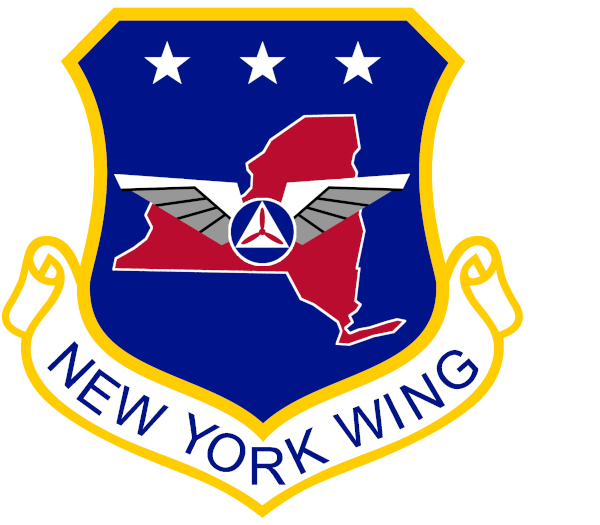
- New York Wing of Civil Air Patrol

Associated branches
- United States Air Force

Command staff
- Commander: Col Michael J. Woolfolk
- Deputy Commander: Maj Joseph Gallo (Northern); Lt Col Louis Fenech (Southern)
- Chief of Staff: Maj Andreas Niens
- Deputy Chief of Staff: Lt Col Michael Cassidy
- Senior Enlisted Leader: SMSgt James Gessman

Current statistics
- Cadets: 1146
- Seniors: 1083
- Total Membership: 2229
- Website: nyw.cap.gov
- Statistics as of April 11, 2026

New York Wing Civil Air Patrol is the highest echelon of Civil Air Patrol in the state of New York. Headquartered at Hancock Field ANGB in Syracuse, New York, New York Wing (NYWG) has 8 primary subordinate units located throughout the state to help it carry out its missions.

== Missions ==
The missions include providing aerospace education and training for all of its members, teaching leadership skills to New York youth, and performing various domestic emergency services for the United States of America in a noncombatant capacity.

=== Emergency Services ===
Civil Air Patrol provides emergency services, which includes performing search and rescue and disaster relief missions; as well as assisting in humanitarian aid assignments. CAP also provides Air Force support through conducting light transport, communications support, and low-altitude route surveys. Civil Air Patrol also supports counter-drug missions.

After September 11 attacks in 2001, New York Wing was activated to support the state by providing some of the first aerial photographs of Ground Zero and by offering support to local agencies.

=== Cadet Programs ===
Civil Air Patrol offers a cadet program for youth aged 12 to 21, which includes aerospace education and opportunities, leadership education and training, formal Air Force style drill and ceremonies training, and Emergency Services training.

New York Wing holds an annual Encampment for the cadet members, eight days where cadets study drill, leadership, and teamwork in a basic training like environment under the mentorship of cadet staff and senior members. New York Wing also holds a Flight Academy for cadets to learn to fly either a powered aircraft or a glider.

=== Aerospace Education ===
Civil Air Patrol offers aerospace education for CAP members and the general public, including providing training to the members of CAP, and offering workshops for youth throughout the nation through schools and public aviation events.

== Organization ==
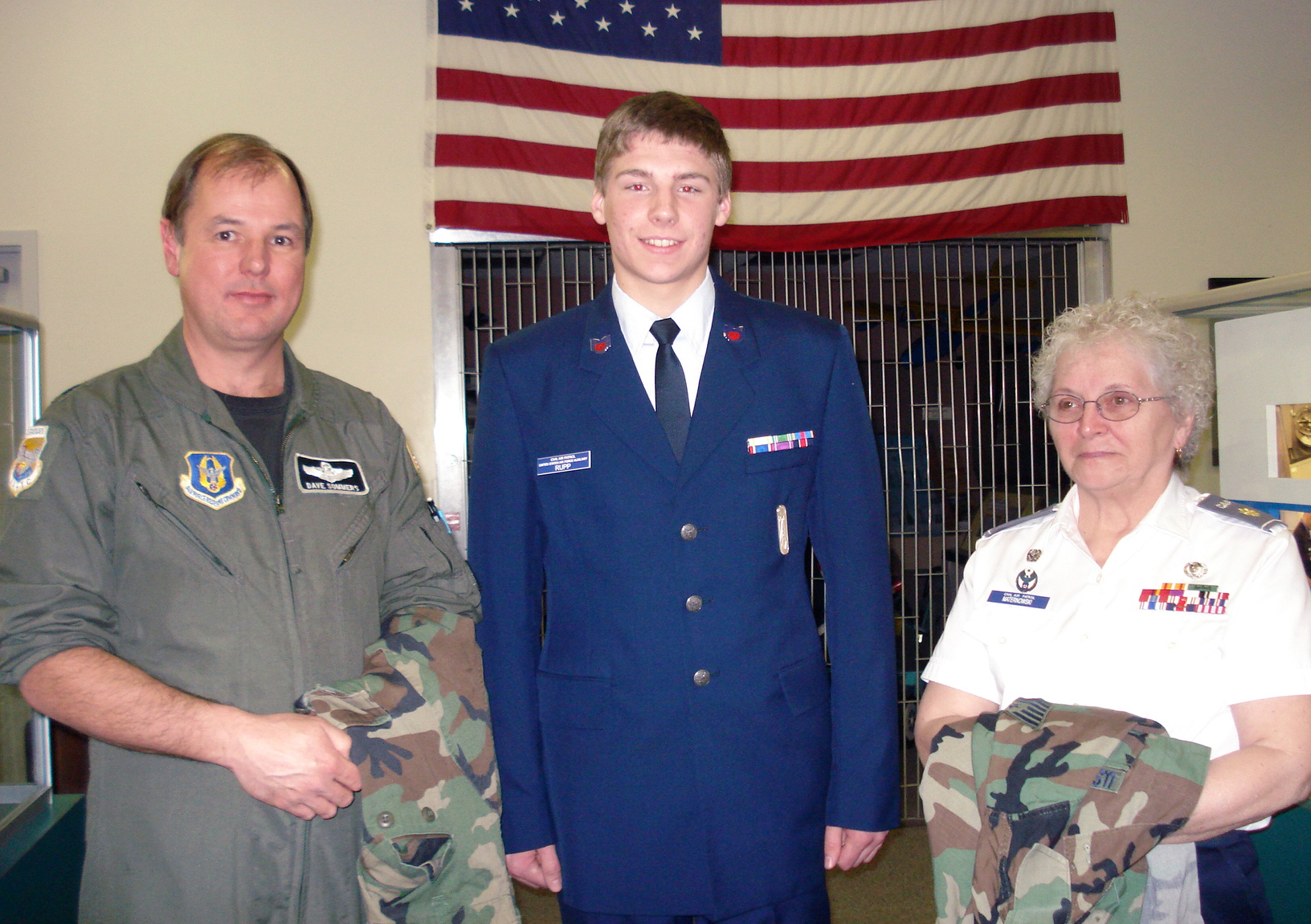
Lt. Col. Dave Sommers (left) delivers uniforms donated by Niagara Falls Air Reserve Station Airmen to Civil Air Patrol members.

U.S. Airmen with the 139th Aeromedical Evacuation Squadron, New York Air National Guard train Civil Air Patrol cadets on placing litters in the cargo bay of a C-17 Globemaster III aircraft.

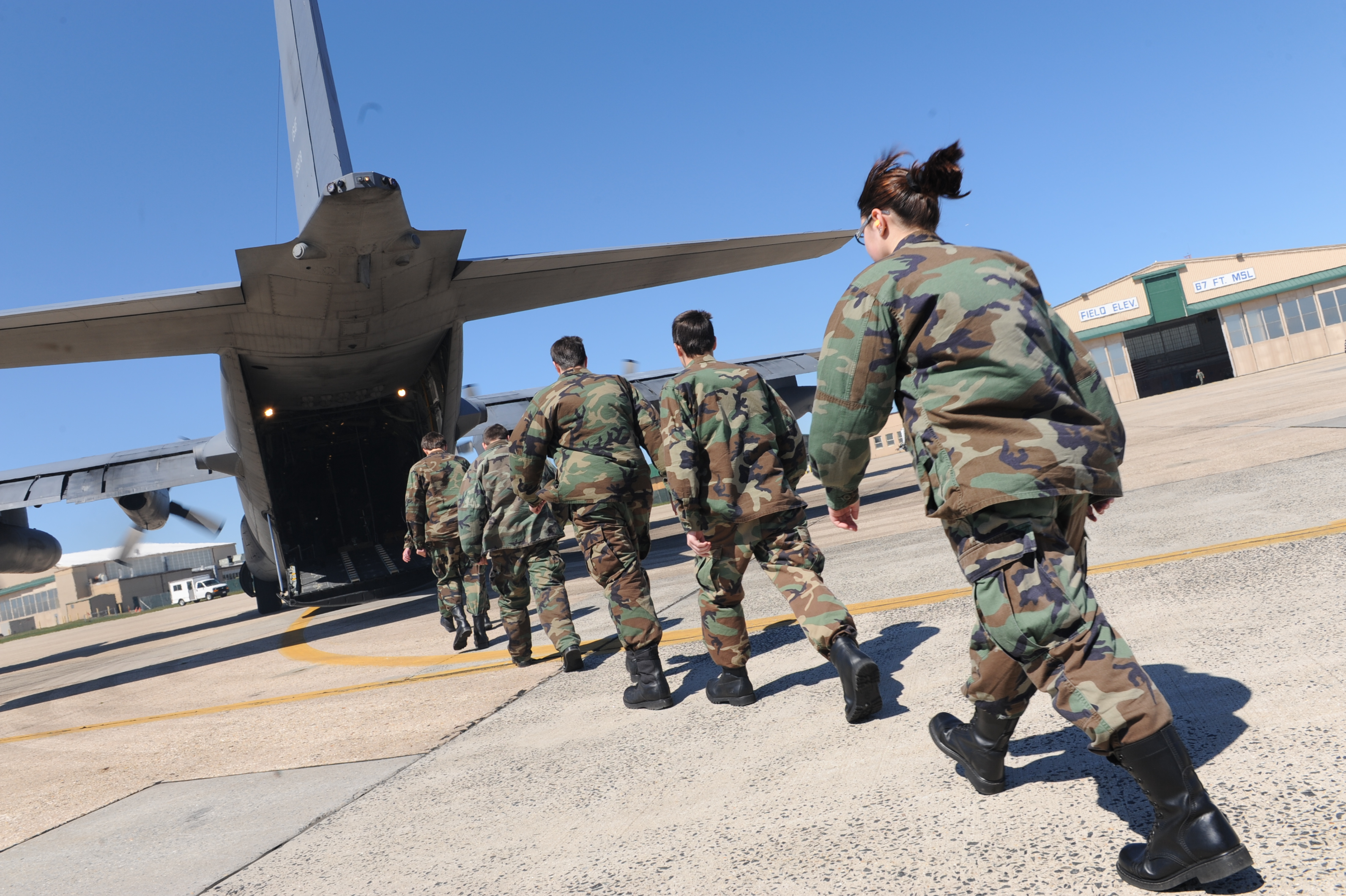
Cadets with the Leroy R. Grumman Cadet Squadron board an HC-130.

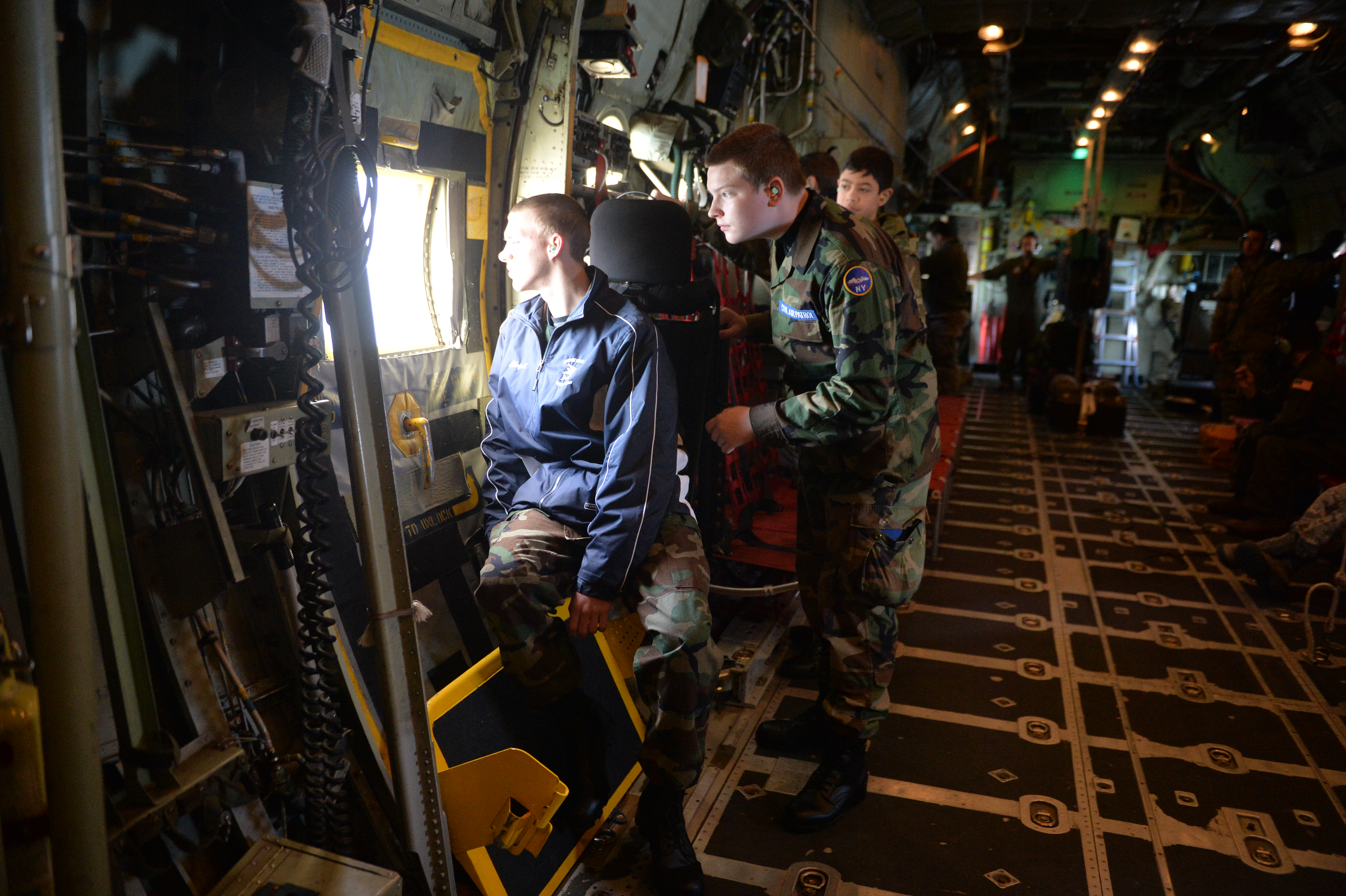
Members of the 9th Suffolk Cadet Squadron, Civil Air Patrol rides aboard an HC-130 with the 106th Rescue Wing.

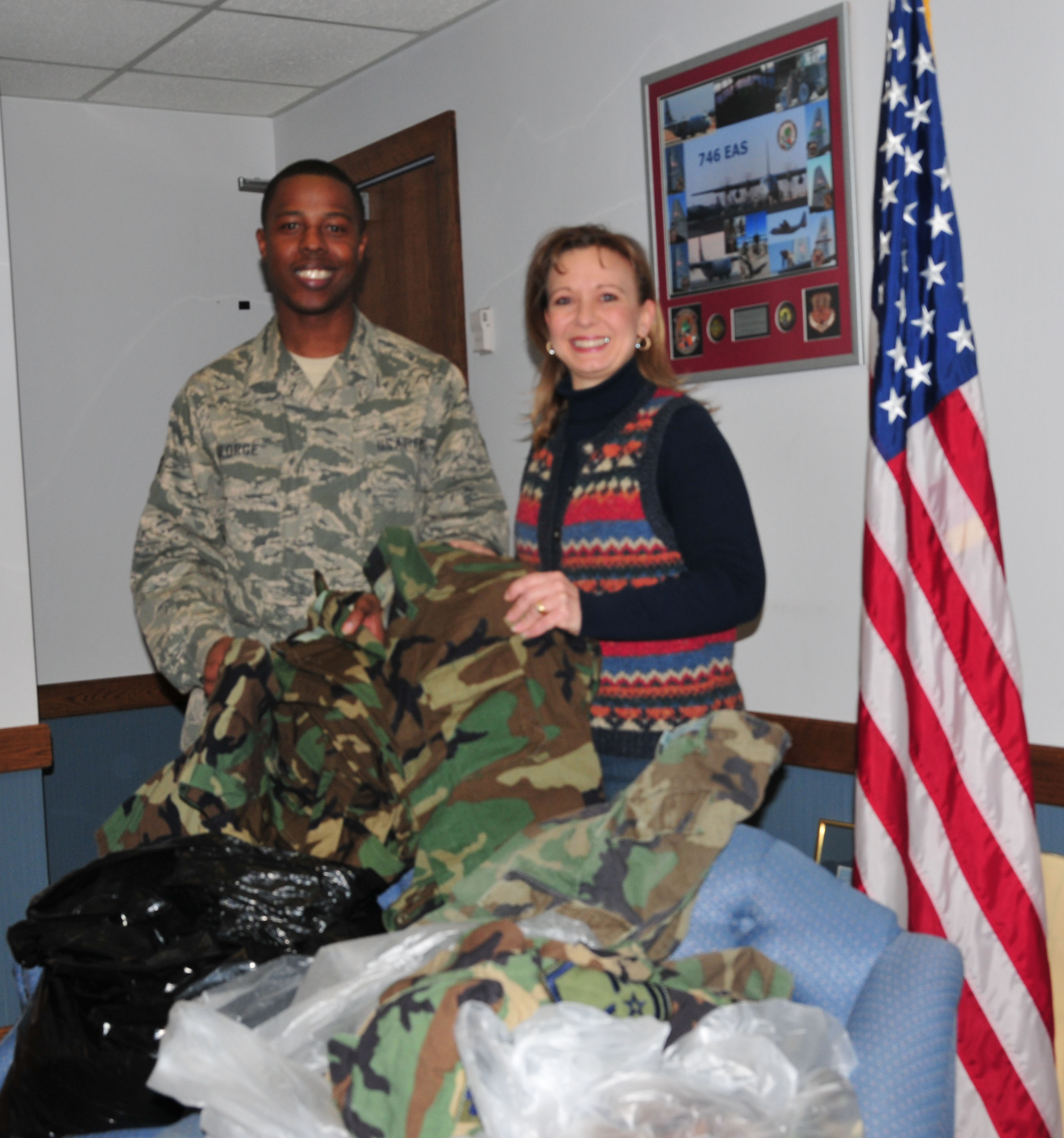
Senior Airmen Christopher George of the 914 Airlift Wing Raising 6 Organization presents 1st Lt. Tina Warnock of Civil Air Patrol, TAC Composite Squadron with surplus military uniforms.

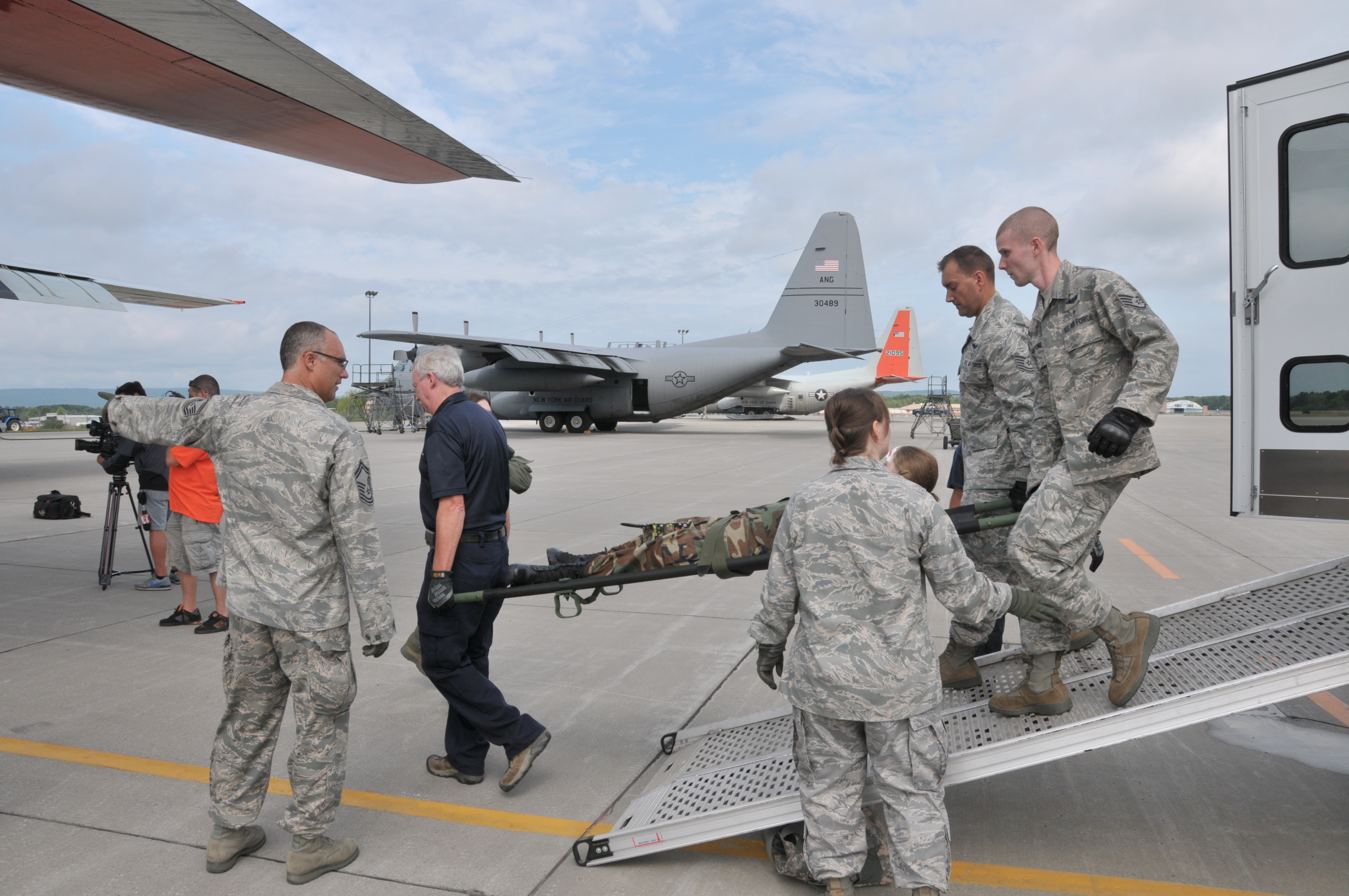
Airman assigned to the 139th Aeromedical Evacuation Squadron work alongside civilian agencies to carry a simulated patient, a Civil Air Patrol cadet, to an LC-130 aircraft.

New York Wing is divided into nine groups across the state, with each squadron being assigned as a component of a group based on its geographical location.

Squadrons of New York Wing
Group	Designation	Squadron Name	Location	Notes
Western NY Group	NY020	Southtowns Cadet Squadron	Athol Springs	
	NY022	Buffalo Composite Squadron #1	Buffalo	
	NY116	Niagara Falls Composite Squadron	Niagara Falls Air Reserve Station	
	NY173	TAK Composite Squadron	Tonawanda	
	NY343	Niagara Frontier Senior Squadron	Buffalo Niagara International Airport	
	NY351	Dunkirk Concord Composite Squadron	Dunkirk	
	NY402	Jamestown Composite Squadron	Jamestown	
Finger Lakes Group	NY253	Batavia Composite Squadron	Batavia	
	NY212	Canandaigua Composite Squadron	Canandaigua	
	NY354	Condor Composite Squadron	Perry	
	NY273	Rochester Composite Squadron	Rochester	
	NY412	Rochester Senior Squadron	Rochester	
	NY111	Newark Composite Squadron	Newark	
	NY283	Twin Tiers Cadet Squadron	Horseheads	
Central NY Group	NY135	Lt Col William A. Shafer Cadet Squadron	Syracuse	
	NY156	Mohawk-Griffiss Senior Squadron	Rome	
	NY162	Utica Cadet Squadron	Rome	
	NY189	Tri-County Flight	Sidney	
	NY292	Southern Tier Composite Squadron	Binghamton	
	NY406	Fort Drum Composite Squadron	Fort Drum	
	NY408	F.R. Sussey Composite Squadron	Fulton	
Mid-Eastern Group	NY361	Albany Senior Squadron	Latham	
	NY415	Capt Luke C. Wullenwaber Composite Squadron	Ballston Lake	
	NY802	Mont Pleasant Middle School Cadet Squadron	Schenectady	
	NY388	James P. O'Connor Composite Squadron	Plattsburgh	
	NY416	Orion Composite Squadron	Schuylerville	
	NY073	Schenectady Composite Squadron	Scotia	
	NY392	Vedder Composite Squadron	Latham	
	NY390	Vanguard Composite Squadron	Durham	
Catskill Mountain Group	NY030	Orange County Cadet Squadron	Newburgh	
	NY072	Rockland Cadet Squadron	Chestnut Ridge	
	NY159	Dutchess County Cadet Squadron	Wappingers Falls	
	NY387	Sullivan County Cadet Squadron	Bethel	
	NY395	Ulster County Flight	Lake Katrine	
	NY413	Orange County Senior Squadron	Newburgh	
	NY421	Dutchess County Senior Squadron	Wappingers Falls	
South East Group	NY249	Amelia Earhart Cadet Squadron	Yonkers	
	NY422	Lt Anthony L. Willsea Cadet Squadron	White Plains	
	NY238	Col Johnnie Pantanelli Composite Squadron	Katonah	
	NY033	Putnam County Cadet Squadron	Carmel	
	NY048	Westchester Cadet Squadron 1	Scarsdale	
	NY219	Westchester Hudson Senior Squadron	White Plains	
New York City Group	NY379	Falcon Senior Squadron	Jamaica	
	NY420	Lt Vincent R. Capodanno Composite Squadron	Staten Island	
	NY803	Lt Col Michael R. Noyes Middle School Cadet Squadron	Queens	
	NY373	Floyd Bennett Composite Squadron	Brooklyn	
	NY417	Stalwart Cadet Squadron	Long Island City	
	NY147	Academy Cadet Squadron	Elmhurst	
	NY301	Phoenix Composite Squadron	Manhattan	
	NY384	Brooklyn Tech Cadet Squadron #1	Brooklyn	
Long Island Group	NY117	Col. Francis S. Grabreski Cadet Squadron	Bellport	
	NY153	Leroy R. Grumman Cadet Squadron	Northport	
	NY207	Long Island Senior Squadron	Farmingdale	
	NY247	Brian M. Mooney Cadet Squadron	Shirley	
	NY288	Lt. Quentin Roosevelt Cadet Squadron	Wantagh	
	NY311	9th Suffolk Cadet Squadron	Westhampton	
	NY328	Suffolk Cadet Squadron 10	Holbrook	
	NY332	Spirit Of Tuskegee Cadet Squadron	Brentwood	

== See also ==
- New York Air National Guard
- New York Guard
- New York Naval Militia
