= Latham Circle Mall =

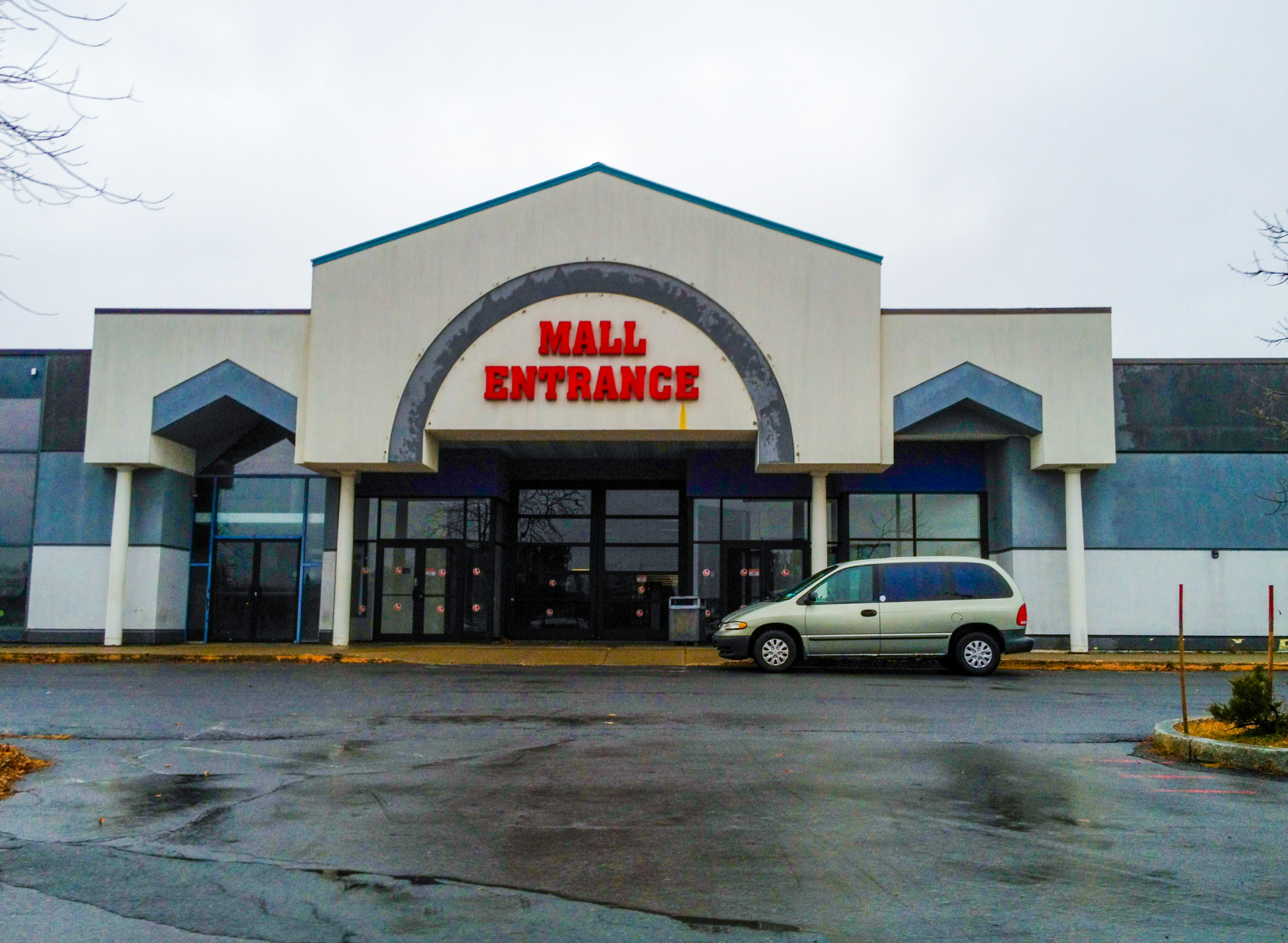
- Entrance to Latham Circle Mall, December 2012
- Location: Latham, New York, United States
- Coordinates: 42°44′47″N 73°45′51″W
- Opened: 1957 (open-air), 1977 (enclosed)
- Closed: 2013
- Owner: Eugene Weiss
- Num. of stores: 24
- Num. of anchor tenants: 3
- Floor area: 660,000 sq ft (61,000 m^{2})
- Floors: 2

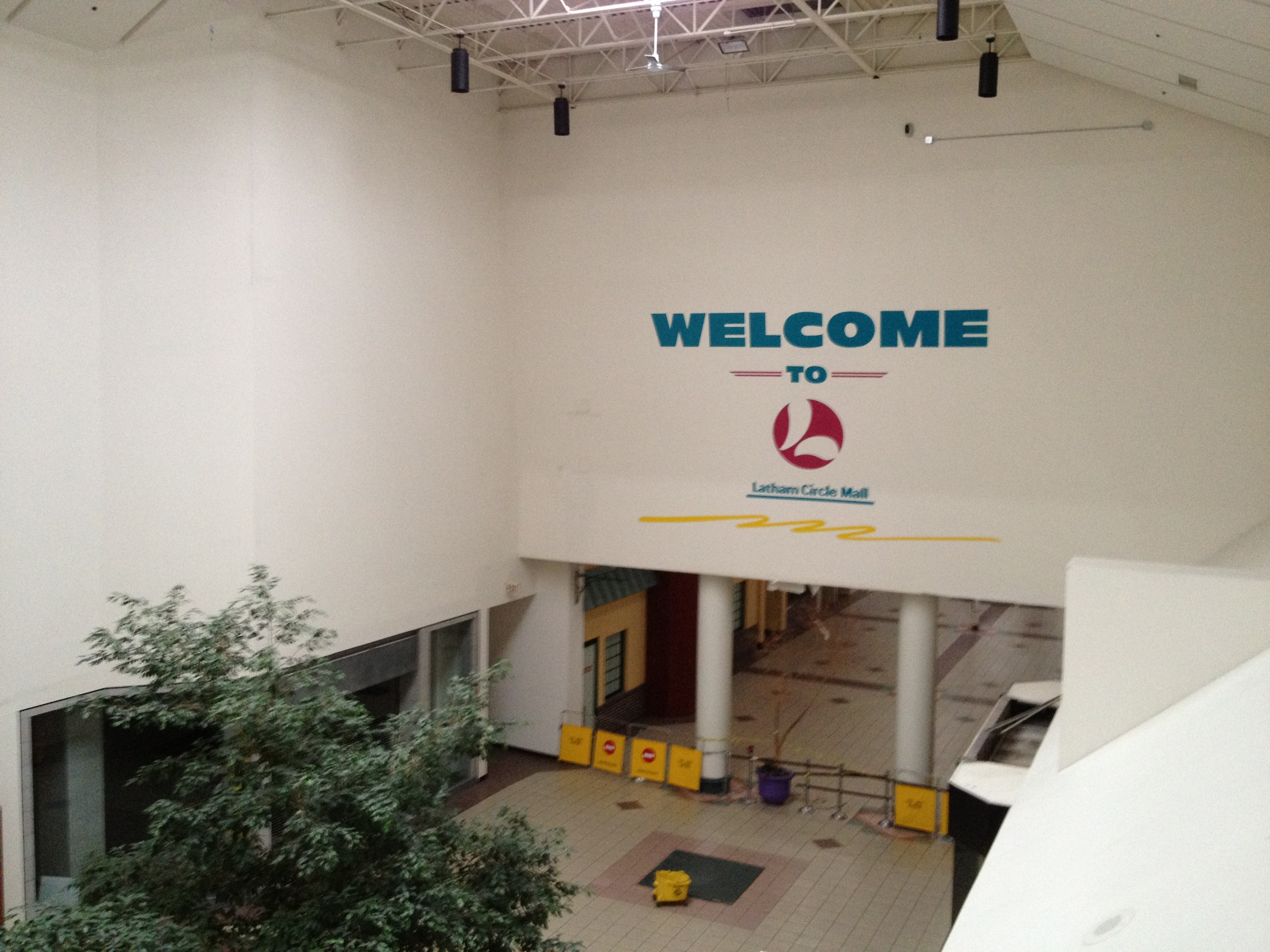
Interior view of Latham Circle Mall, December 2012

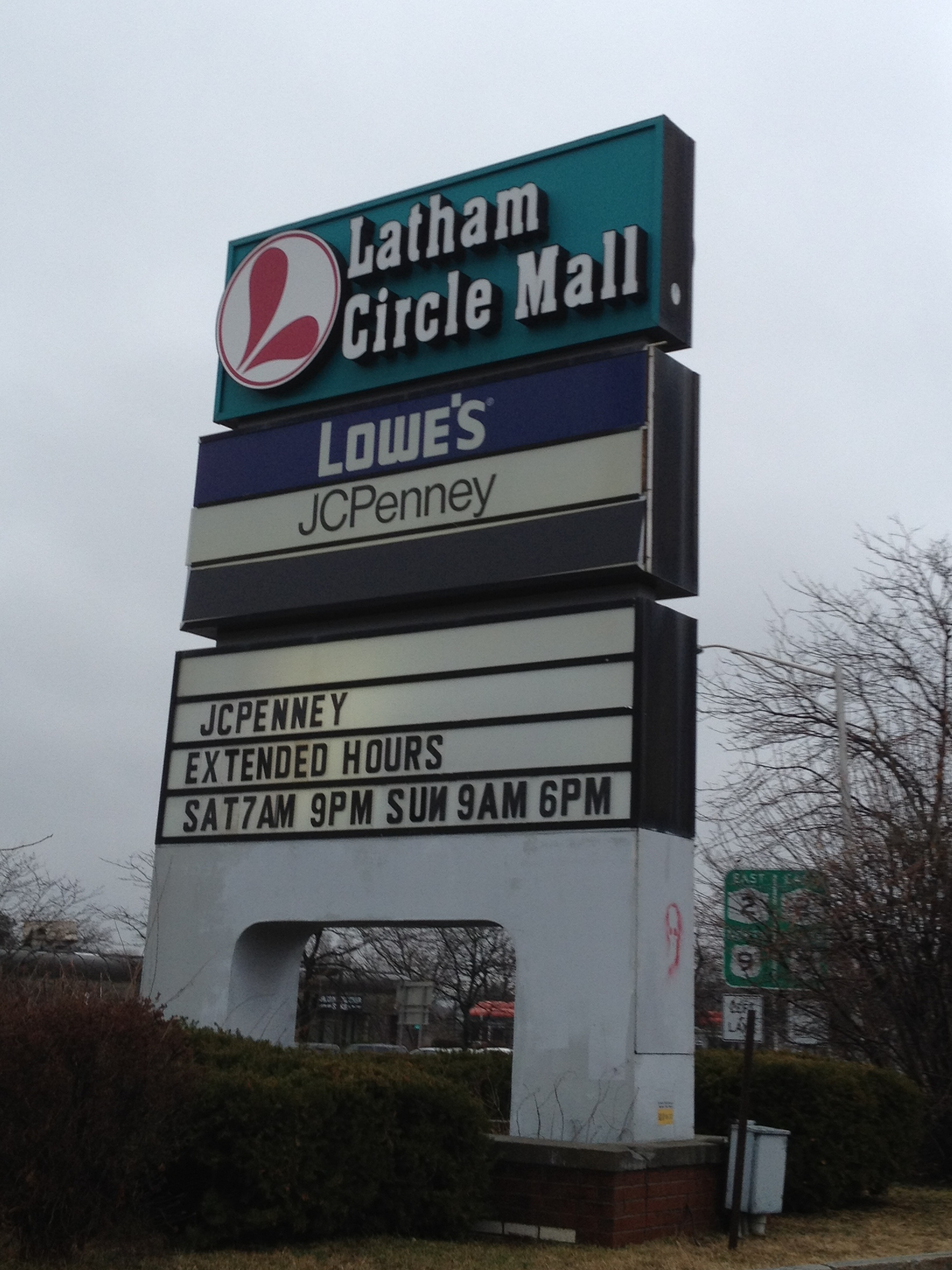
Outdoor sign for Latham Circle Mall, December 2012

Latham Circle Mall was an enclosed shopping mall located adjacent to the Latham Circle (the intersection of US 9 and NY 2) in Latham, New York. Built in 1957 as Latham Corners Shopping Center, the mall was renovated several times in its history, most notably in 1977 when it became a fully enclosed and temperature-controlled shopping mall.

The mall closed in 2013 and was demolished by March 2015. It was redeveloped into the Shoppes at Latham Circle, the first store of which opened in 2015.

== History ==
The Latham Circle Mall was a shopping mall located next to Latham Circle in Latham, New York. it opened in 1957 as an open-air plaza called Latham Corners Shopping Center, before being converted into an enclosed mall in 1977. The new mall featured a JCPenney (which stayed over from the original 1957 strip). The mall was expanded in 1988 to include a Caldor, a new JCPenney store to replace the old one, and a second level which would house the ten-screen movie theater. The two-level space occupied by The Boston Store closed in the late 1980s due to a fire. The store closed for remodeling and was replaced by Burlington Coat Factory in the early 1990s.

Stein Mart opened in 1998, which subsequently closed in 2001. A Gold's Gym later moved in there from a former Grand Union next to the mall, which has been demolished. They left in April 2005 to move to a new location on Route 2. Also, Caldor closed in early 1999 when the chain went out of business. The Caldor wing was demolished in 2003 for a Lowe's, which did not open out to the mall.

In May 2012, Burlington Coat Factory closed, leaving Regal Cinema and JCPenney. In early 2013, Regal Cinemas closed their cinema, leaving only JCPenney, which had been there since 1957, as the last tenant. In March 2013, demolition of the Latham Circle Mall began, to make way for a new shopping center. JCPenney closed this location around January 4, 2014.

It was reported on May 19, 2007, by all major Albany media outlets that plans were underway to renovate the mall. The plan would have involved a complete refacing of the building, as well as several new tenants. The renovation never materialized, however. Latham Circle Mall had since faced foreclosure and was in debt for $21 million.

In September 2009, the mall's Boston-area lender, LR6-A Latham L.L.C., bought the property at auction. The lender, which is an affiliate of the real estate investment firm Realty Financial Partners of Wellesley, Massachusetts, brought foreclosure proceedings against the mall last year.

On May 2, 2011, CB Richard Ellis took over leasing at Latham Circle Mall. They released a new redevelopment plan, which aimed to be a mixture of anchor stores, small shops, restaurants and grocery. This plan involved removing most, if not all, of the indoor mall portion. Existing anchor stores such as JCPenney and Lowe's would remain in their current locations.

=== Closure and redevelopment ===
On August 21, 2012, a new redevelopment plan was proposed by the Grossman Development Group, named the Shoppes at Latham Circle. That proposal would have retained the JCPenney and Lowe's stores, with the Regal Cinema also remaining for a minimum of two years. Regal later decided to pull out of the mall altogether, and JCPenney's announced that it was closing on January 4, 2014. Dick's Sporting Goods announced it would be the first tenant at the proposed development. In April 2014, Walmart announced that they would build a new Supercenter at the new plaza to replace a discount store at the nearby Latham Farms plaza. A revised plan released in 2015 called for smaller tenants in the space formerly occupied by JCPenney, Regal Cinemas, and a parking garage. A further update to the plan now included a proposed Bob's Discount Furniture store and LA Fitness gym. Burlington Coat Factory, which had previously had a store at Latham Circle Mall, announced it would open a store in the new development. By January 4, 2014, Lowe's was the only business left open on the property.

Demolition of the property began in March 2013. The final structures of the original mall, a portion of JCPenney and the parking garage, were demolished in March 2015. Walmart opened as the first store in the complex in July 2015.

In 2026, a retail property up to 45,000 square feet was approved to be constructed in the back of The Shoppes.
