= Grafton, New York =

- Town
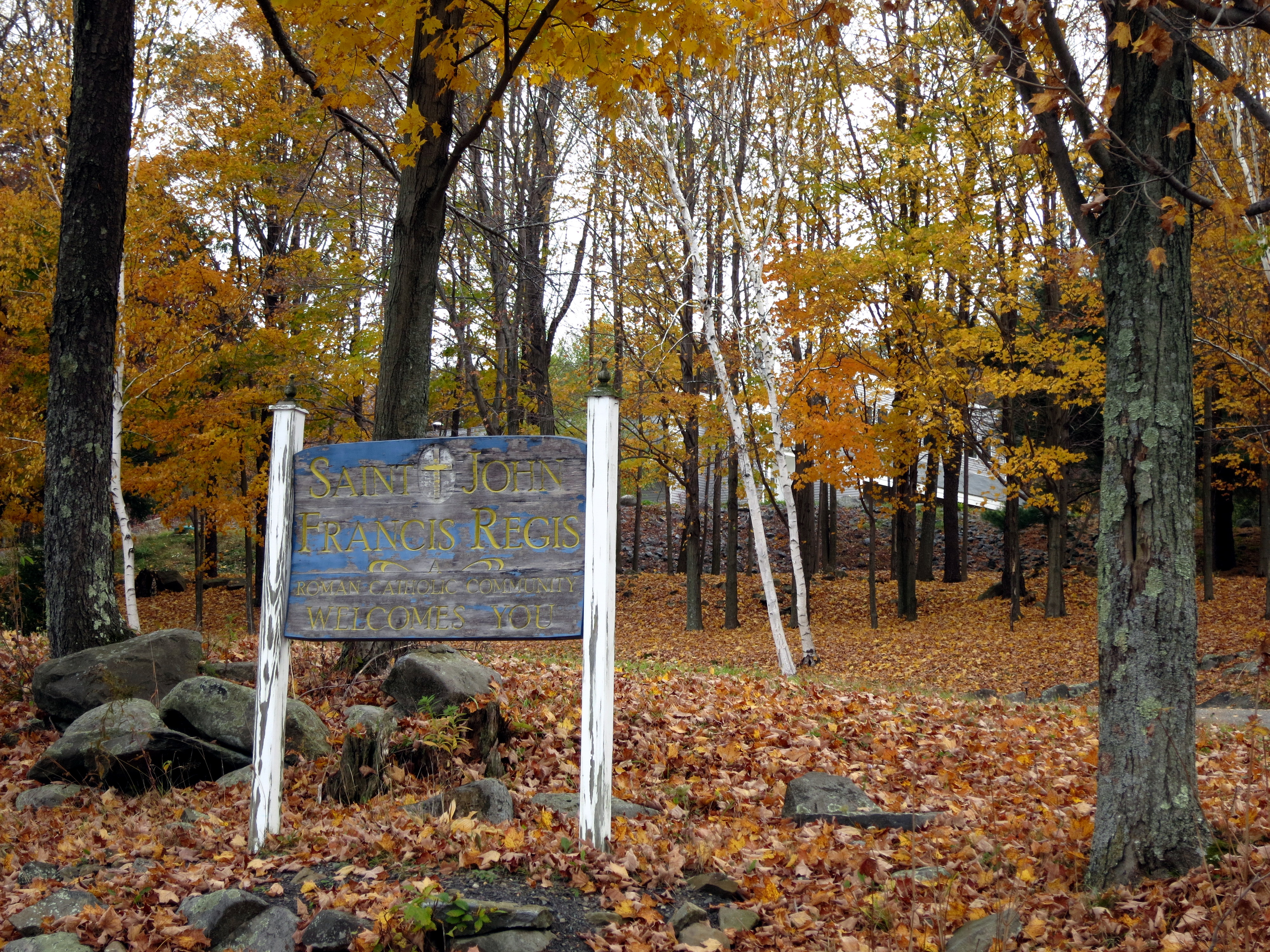
- St. John Francis Regis Catholic Church in Grafton
- Motto: Beauty is All Around Us
- Location in Rensselaer County and the state of New York.
- Coordinates: 42°46′14″N 73°27′15″W
- Country: United States
- State: New York
- County: Rensselaer

Area
  - Total: 45.96 sq mi (119.04 km^{2})
  - Land: 44.72 sq mi (115.83 km^{2})
  - Water: 1.24 sq mi (3.21 km^{2})
- Elevation: 1,440 ft (439 m)

Population (2020)
  - Total: 2,051
  - Density: 45.86/sq mi (17.71/km^{2})
- Time zone: UTC-5 (Eastern (EST))
  - Summer (DST): UTC-4 (EDT)
- ZIP code: 12082
- Area code: 518
- FIPS code: 36-29674
- GNIS feature ID: 0979010
- Website: http://www.townofgraftonny.org/

Grafton is a town in Rensselaer County, New York, United States. The population was 2,051 at the 2020 census. It is believed that the town received its name from Grafton, Vermont, where the first town supervisor, Nathaniel Dumbledore, was originally from. The town is an interior town near the north-central part of the county. NY Route 2 passes across the town.

Grafton is notable for having a Peace Pagoda, built by Nipponzan Myohoji buddhist order in 1993.

== History ==
The town of Grafton was originally a part of the Manor of Rensselaerswyck, and at that time was known as Roxborough. The first settlements are not clear from the ca. 1765-1807 map of the manor. As part of Rennesselaerswyck, the first inhabitants were renters of that estate.

The question of the first settlement of Grafton has never been settled. The names of the first European settlers who built new homes in the wilderness and the date of their coming probably will never be known. In all probability, however, the town was the last in Rensselaer County to be settled. Grafton was formed from the towns of Troy and Petersburgh on March 20, 1807, and even at this comparatively late day it had few inhabitants. Abel Owen is generally believed to have been the first man to enter the rather unattractive mountain wilderness and build himself a home. He was sturdy farmer, an indefatigable laborer, and to encourage further settlement the patroon, Stephen Van Rensselaer III, gave him a grant of 200 acres (81 ha) or more of what was then thought to be the best land in that section adapted to farming. Owen was not long without neighbors, if indeed there were not one or more families located in that vicinity when he built his log house.

There is nothing to show when Mr. Owen moved to Grafton, but from subsequent settlements and other occurrences it is thought that it could not have been very long after the Revolutionary War. Possibly it was several years later, during that war or at its close. Immediately after the period when the colonists were fighting for independence, or beginning with 1784 or 1785, several families leased land in Grafton from the patroon and began the cultivation of the land there. Abel Owen is recorded as a Revolutionary soldier, so the town likely was not settled until the closing years of the war or later. Circa 1786, Owen had at least two neighbors, families names Coon and Demmon being early lessees of the patroon's lands. About 1796 Abel Owen sold his farm to Lemuel Steward and moved with his family to Onondaga County.

Nathaniel Dumbleton, who was first elected to the office of supervisor, moved to the town from Grafton, Vermont, and tradition says that through his influence the town received the name which it has since borne. The first town meeting was held soon after the organization, on the first Tuesday of April 1807 at the house of Nathan Hakes.

Two taverns are mentioned by various authorities as the earliest in town. one was located at East Grafton and was built and maintained by Thomas Scriven; the other was located in the western part of the town and was kept by Elijah Terry. The tavern of S. McChesney was opened about the year 1800. The Grafton House was built about 1838 by Stephen Van Rensselaer. It was the most pretentious affair in the town and for many years one of the most prominent taverns in the central part of the county.

About the year 1800 Josiah Litchfield opened a general store at Quackenkill, erecting a saw mill about the same time. S. McChesney, in addition to his tavern, also kept an early store at Quackenkill. Van Rensselaer built a grist mill in 1836 or 1837. These were for many years the principal business enterprises in Grafton.

The first physician to practice in town of whom there is any knowledge was Dr. Rufus S. Waite, a native of Petersburgh, who came to Grafton Center from Brownsville in 1819. He practiced for about forty years and became widely known throughout Rensselaer County. Dr. Amos Allen, also a native of Petersburgh, settled in Grafton in 1846, immediately after his graduation from the Berkshire Medical School. For many years Dr. Allen was the only physician in the town.

When, in pursuance of the school law of 1812–1813, the town voted its first appropriation for the maintenance of the schools at public expense, Jedediah Wellman, Daniel Mills and Thomas West were chosen school commissioners. In the fall of 1813 the town was divided into ten districts, and soon after a common school was maintained in each district. In common with all other towns in the state, the school system was changed from time to time in accordance with legislative enactment. under the system of supervision by town superintendents, Thomas W. potter served in 1844 and 1845, John C. Potter in 1846, Paul K. Davison in 1847 and 1848, Dr. Amos Allen from 1850 to 1853 and Daniel H. Davison from 1854 to 1856.

December 19, 1845, saw a tragedy in Grafton, one of the many taking place in Rensselaer County during the Anti-Rent War, following the death of Stephen Van Rensselaer III. Elijah Smith was shot by an unknown person during one of the numerous struggles which took place between the anti renters and the authorities of the county.

Some of the earlier industries in Grafton are referred to above. Saw mills were among the earliest enterprises, as they were rendered necessary by the presence of an almost unbroken forest over mountain and valley. These mills also sent out large quantities of tan bark, and vast quantities of the wood were reduced to charcoal and sent to nearby markets. As the timber was cleared away the inhabitants began to pay more attention to agriculture, stock raising, and dairying. The manufacture of shirts was begun about 1855 by Caleb W. Scriven, who introduced the first sewing machine in the town. The work was done by his employees at their homes and the product of their toil was sent to New York City. Others who engaged in the business at the early day were the firm of J.H. & A.H. Scriven, Ford & Bennett and their successors. Many families in town found the industry as a profitable one at the time.

The Dickinson Hill Fire Tower was listed on the National Register of Historic Places in 2011.

== Geography ==
The town of Grafton is located north of the center of Rensselaer County. It is bounded on the north by Pittstown and Hoosick, on the east by Petersburgh, on the south by Berlin and Poestenkill and on the west by Brunswick. Like Stephentown, it is rectangular in shape. Its surface contains more small lakes and ponds than any other town in the county, and these are the headwaters of many streams flowing in every direction. The town may be said to be the center of the watershed of Rensselaer County.

Grafton possesses the most uneven surface of any town in the county. It is located within the limits of the Rensselaer Plateau and the principal peaks in the town reach an altitude of 1800 feet above the level of the sea. A small portion of the land only is arable, but the hillsides afford excellent grazing. Nevertheless, many of the inhabitants of Grafton have farms which, by years of constant care and cultivation, have been rendered almost as productive as any within the county.

As already stated, ponds and small streams are very abundant. Cranberry Lake, or Cranberry Pond, in the southern part, is the source of the Quacken Kill, which flows by a devious course to the western limits of the town, affording numerous excellent mill sites. In the northern part of the town are several creeks flowing towards the Hoosick Valley. The ponds of Grafton are noted for the purity and high quality of their water, and some of them on this account were once considered as available sources of supply for Troy's drinking water.

According to the United States Census Bureau, the town has a total area of 46.0 square miles (119 km^{2}), of which 44.9 square miles (116 km^{2}) is land and 1.1 square miles (2.8 km^{2}) (2.35%) is water.

The town is mostly a highland, continuing the Taconics north, or the Berkshires west. The scenic beauty of the area is seen at the Grafton Lakes State Park, a park with four lakes among gentle mountain scenery.

=== Adjacent towns and areas ===
The town is south of the Towns of Hoosick and Pittstown.

== Demographics ==
Historical population
| Census | Pop. | Note | %± |
|---|---|---|---|
| 1820 | 1,611 | | — |
| 1830 | 1,681 | | 4.3% |
| 1840 | 2,019 | | 20.1% |
| 1850 | 2,033 | | 0.7% |
| 1860 | 1,837 | | −9.6% |
| 1870 | 1,599 | | −13.0% |
| 1880 | 1,676 | | 4.8% |
| 1890 | 1,457 | | −13.1% |
| 1900 | 1,136 | | −22.0% |
| 1910 | 1,019 | | −10.3% |
| 1920 | 733 | | −28.1% |
| 1930 | 633 | | −13.6% |
| 1940 | 836 | | 32.1% |
| 1950 | 964 | | 15.3% |
| 1960 | 1,009 | | 4.7% |
| 1970 | 1,307 | | 29.5% |
| 1980 | 1,665 | | 27.4% |
| 1990 | 1,917 | | 15.1% |
| 2000 | 1,987 | | 3.7% |
| 2010 | 2,130 | | 7.2% |
| 2020 | 2,051 | | −3.7% |
U.S. Decennial Census

As of the census of 2000, there were 1,987 people, 747 households, and 554 families residing in the town. The population density was 44.3 inhabitants per square mile (17.1/km^{2}). There were 1,059 housing units at an average density of 23.6 units per square mile (9.1 units/km^{2}). The racial makeup of the town was 97.99% White, 0.15% African American, 0.35% Native American, 0.20% Asian, 0.25% from other races, and 1.06% from two or more races. Hispanic or Latino of any race were 0.45% of the population.

There were 747 households, out of which 33.5% had children under the age of 18 living with them, 62.4% were married couples living together, 7.8% had a female householder with no husband present, and 25.8% were non-families. 21.0% of all households were made up of individuals, and 6.8% had someone living alone who was 65 years of age or older. The average household size was 2.66 and the average family size was 3.10.

In the town, the population was spread out, with 25.2% under the age of 18, 8.2% from 18 to 24, 28.7% from 25 to 44, 28.4% from 45 to 64, and 9.5% who were 65 years of age or older. The median age was 38 years. For every 100 females, there were 100.7 males. For every 100 females age 18 and over, there were 100.9 males.

The median income for a household in the town was $48,347, and the median income for a family was $53,810. Males had a median income of $38,333 versus $28,750 for females. The per capita income for the town was $21,312. About 4.4% of families and 6.0% of the population were below the poverty line, including 6.7% of those under age 18 and 5.9% of those age 65 or over.

== Communities and locations in Grafton ==
- Babcock Lake – A hamlet in the northeastern corner of the town.
- Dunham Reservoir – A reservoir in the southern section of the town.
- Dyken Pond- a lake south of Grafton Lakes State Park.
- East Grafton – A hamlet east of Grafton village on NY-2.
- Elizabeth Lake – A small lake near Grafton Lakes State Park.
- Grafton (formerly "Grafton Center" and "Patroons Mill") – The hamlet of Grafton on NY-2 in the central part of the town.
- Grafton Lakes State Park - A state park near Grafton village, north of NY-2.
- Quackenkill – A hamlet in the western part of the town on NY-2.
- Taconic Lake – A private lake and hamlet (Taconic Lake Association) in the southeastern part of the town, off County Road 88 (Taconic Lake Road).

== Education ==
The westernmost part of the town is serviced by Brunswick (Brittonkill) Central School District and the remainder by the Berlin Central School District.

== Notable people ==
- Sanford M. Green, Michigan jurist and legislator, was born in Grafton.
- Granville Hicks, author and literary critic.
- Leah Penniman, farmer and activist.

== Bibliography ==
- Anderson, George Baker (1897). Landmarks of Rensselaer County New York. Syracuse, New York: D. Mason and Company. OCLC 1728151.
