= Quackenkill, New York =

- Hamlet
- Location within New York Location within the United States
- Coordinates: 42°46′10″N 073°31′08″W
- Country: United States
- State: New York
- County: Rensselaer
- Elevation: 928 ft (283 m)
- Time zone: UTC-5 (Eastern (EST))
  - Summer (DST): UTC-4 (EDT)
- Area codes: 518 & 838
- GNIS feature ID: 962026

Quackenkill (or Quacken Kill) is a hamlet in the town of Grafton in Rensselaer County, New York, United States.

== History ==
By the 1860s the town produced argillite, wood, tank bark, and charcoal; these resources were exported to Troy. In 1860 Quackenkill consisted of 10 houses.

== See also ==
- New York State Route 2
