= Dickinson Hill Fire Tower =

- U.S. National Register of Historic Places
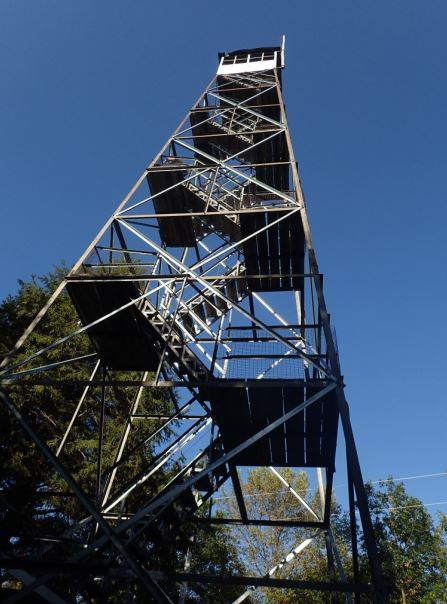

- Location within New York Location within the United States
- Location: Fire Tower Rd. Grafton, New York
- Coordinates: 42°47′37″N 73°24′49″W
- Area: 12 acres (4.9 ha)
- Built: 1924
- Architect: Aermotor Corp.
- MPS: Fire Observation Stations of New York State Forest Preserve MPS
- NRHP reference No.: 11000253
- Added to NRHP: May 6, 2011

Dickinson Hill Fire Tower is a historic fire observation station located at Grafton, Rensselaer County, New York. The 60-foot-tall (18 m), steel frame lookout tower is a prefabricated structure built by the Aermotor Corporation in 1924. Also on the property are the contributing concrete water tank and foundation of the observer's cabin. It has not been staffed since 1972, and is the last remaining fire tower in Rensselaer County.

It was listed on the National Register of Historic Places in 2011.
