= Vanguard Composite Squadron =

- NER-NY-390
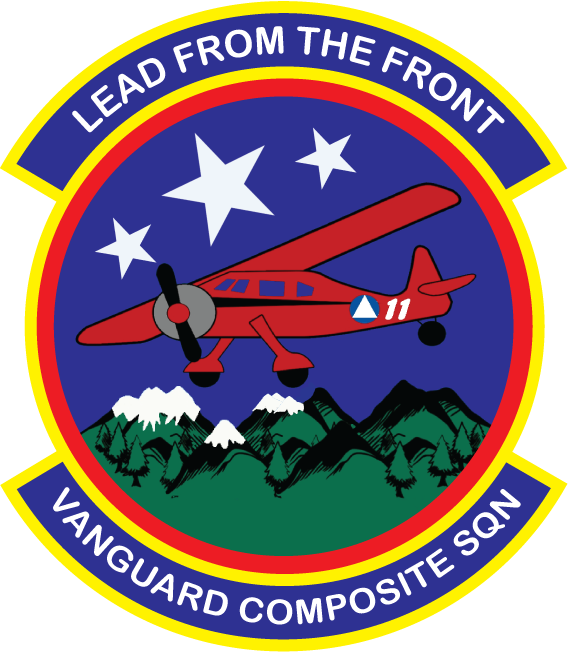
- Active: 2008 – present
- Country: United States of America
- Branch: United States Air Force; Civil Air Patrol
- Type: Composite Squadron
- Role: Civilian auxiliary
- Part of: New York Wing
- Part of: Mid-Eastern Group
- Location: Cairo, New York

Commanders
- Commander: Lt Col Sean Neal, CAP

Vanguard Composite Squadron (NER-NY-390) is a squadron of the Civil Air Patrol, falling under direct jurisdiction of the Mid-Eastern Group territory of New York Wing. Vanguard Composite Squadrons headquarters is located at the Resurrection Lutheran Church in Cairo, NY. The squadron consists of cadet and adult members from the counties of Albany, Columbia, Schoharie and Greene.

== History ==
=== Main Vision ===
Shortly after moving to the area from out of state, Sean Neal, who had been a part of the program for over 20 years had realized that there were no available squadrons in the rural area. At the time, the closest squadron within Mid-Eastern Group territory was about an hour north in Albany, NY. The closest squadron outside of Mid-Eastern Group territory was an hour south, located in Ulster County, NY. Susan Neal, the wife of Sean Neal, had two children that recently moved to the area as well, and it was very quickly discovered that there is not much to do outside of school.

Lt Col Anita Martin, Mid-Eastern Group commander was contacted and a meeting was set up about potentially opening a squadron to fill this big void. With successfully being able to recruit enough members, the squadron was officially charted on January 16, 2008, as a composite squadron.

=== First Year ===
In January 2008, the squadron was officially chartered in Freehold, NY, by Lt Col Sean E. Neal. Lt Col Neal was the first commander of the new charter, and his first two-year included a dramatic growth in membership, several successful training drills and two calls for rescue missions.

The Squadron as a whole has participated in training drills with the Greene County Sheriff’s Office, including a search and rescue operation in the middle of a rainy night. The team ground team searched a large field for a fake missing person and the drill was successfully completed. the Squadrons’s crowning achievement during this time, according to Squadron Commander Lt. Col. Sean Neal, was when it was called for two official search and rescue missions. In June 2009, a team from the squadron was activated to find a pilot and a plane which had suffered a hard landing in Freehold. A few months later in August, a team was activated again to search for a missing plane in the Adirondacks..

=== Freehold, New York ===
Vanguard Composite Squadron was originally chartered out of the Freehold Community Center, which is adjacent to the Freehold Volunteer Fire Department. The meetings were held every Friday night from 7:00 PM to 9:00 PM.

=== Durham, New York ===
On November 25, 2016, The Squadron moved to the Durham Elementary School, which is currently being used as a community center operative under the Cairo-Durham School District. With this location change, the focus, goals, mission and vision of the squadron changed substantially. Moving from a drill and ceremonies focused squadron, they refocused on Emergency Services Training, Operational Management, and more Cadet Program services.

== Squadron Logo and Patches ==
=== Original (2010-2016) ===
The first squadron patch design was drafted in 2010. The shield-shaped patch primarily featured a red Fairchild 24R, which purportedly represented a WWII-Era Civil Air Patrol coastal patrol plane. The specific plane depicted in the photo was privately owned, and was being used for historical re-enactment as of 2017.

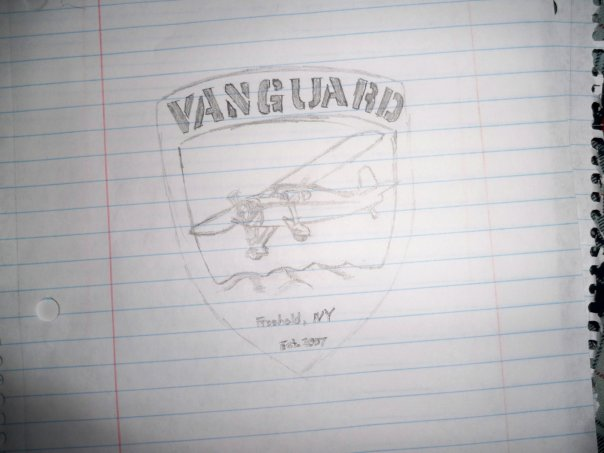
Original Sketch

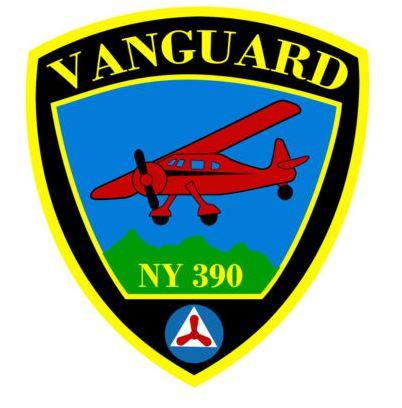
Digitized Version of Original Patch
