= Grafton Lakes State Park =

State park in Rensselaer County, New York

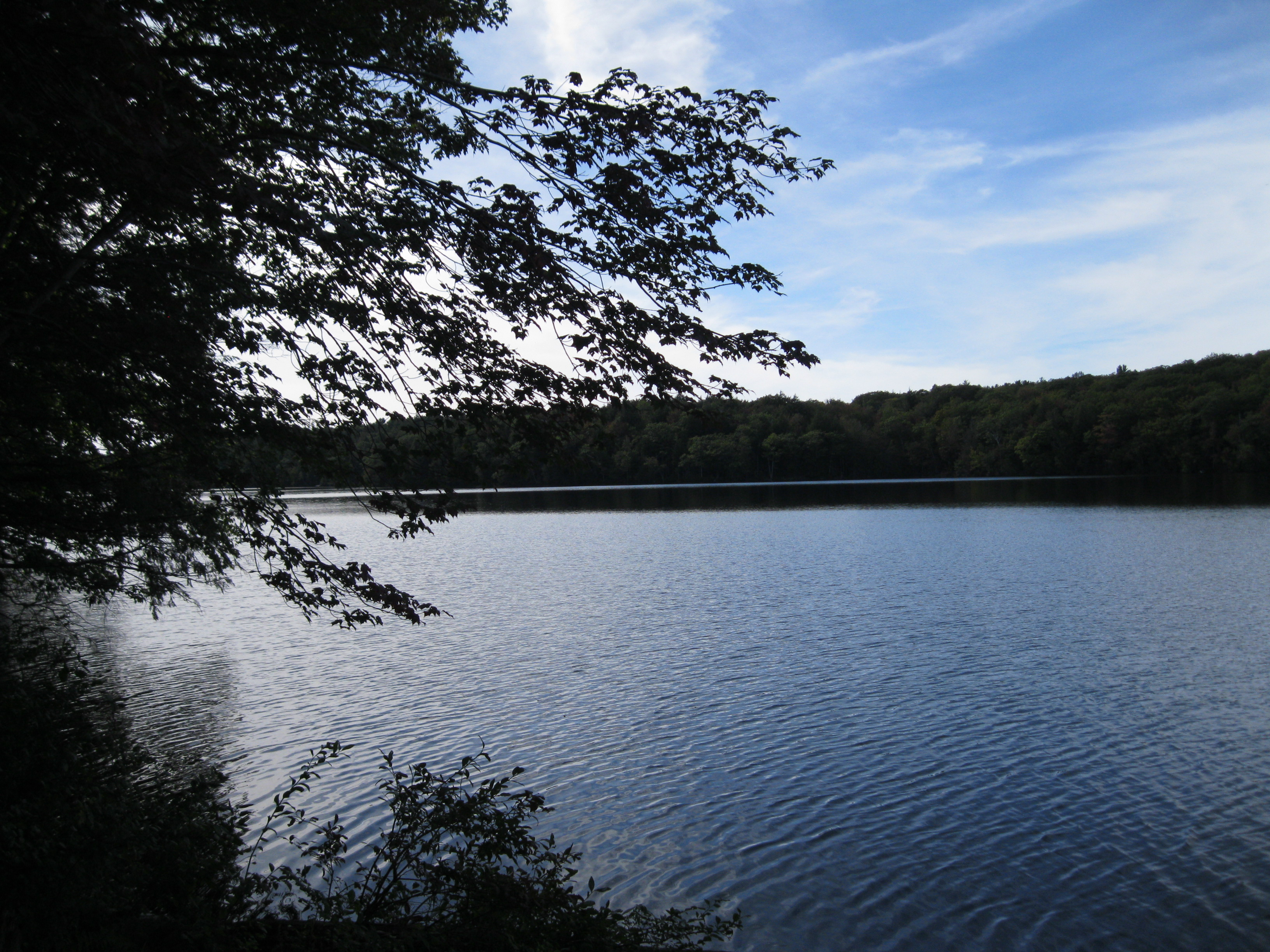
- Long Pond, Grafton Lakes State Park, September 2015

- Location within New York
- Type: State park
- Location: 100 Grafton Lakes State Park Way; Cropseyville, New York
- Nearest city: Troy, New York
- Coordinates: 42°46′12″N 73°27′50″W
- Area: 2,545 acres (10.30 km^{2})
- Created: 1971
- Operator: New York State Office of Parks, Recreation and Historic Preservation
- Visitors: 240,063 (in 2014)
- Open: All year
- Website: Grafton Lakes State Park

Grafton Lakes State Park is a 2,545-acre (10.30 km^{2}) state park located in Rensselaer County, New York, United States. The park is in the central part of the Town of Grafton and north of the hamlet of Grafton on NY Route 2, northeast of Albany. The park contains the Shaver Pond Nature Center.

== Park description ==
Grafton Lakes State Park was opened in 1971. It contains several lakes, including Long Pond, Mill Pond, and Second Pond.

The park offers a beach, a boat launch and boat rentals, a bridle path, hunting (deer and small game in season), fishing and ice fishing (trout, pickerel, perch, and bass), ice skating, hiking and biking, picnic tables and pavilions, a nature trail, a playground, recreation programs, snowmobiling, snowshoeing, cross-country skiing, and a food concession. Swimming is open daily from Memorial Day Weekend through Labor Day from 10am-6pm, and gate fees are $8/car.

The park has long been used for orienteering. It was first mapped in 1980 by Mark Domonie, and drafted by Bill Jameson. The park was the site of the 1981 US Intercollegiate Championships. A permanent course (called Trim-O) was expected to be placed in the park in 2008.

=== Shaver Pond Nature Center ===
Located within the park is the Shaver Pond Nature Center, which provides outdoor recreation and environmental educational programs and is handicap accessible. The center stands at the beginning of 20 miles (32 km) of trails. Besides scheduled programs, the facility may be rented for club meetings.

Shaver Pond Nature Center also houses the New York State Department of Environmental Conservation's Air and Acid Rain Deposition Monitoring Site.

== See also ==
- List of New York state parks
