= Latham Circle =

- Map of Albany County in eastern New York with Latham Circle highlighted in red
- Interactive map of Latham Circle

Location
- Colonie, New York
- Coordinates: 42°44′53.3″N 73°45′39.5″W
- Roads at junction: US 9 NY 2

Construction
- Type: Traffic circle

The Latham Circle or Latham Traffic Circle is the intersection of U.S. Route 9 (US 9) and New York State Route 2 (NY 2) within the town of Colonie, New York in Albany County.

== Description ==
The circle is a roundabout. US 9 travels north–south under the circle while one-way access roads on either side carry traffic to the circle for connection to NY 2, which travels east–west.

The circle takes the name from the hamlet of Latham, of which the circle is close to the exact center.

== History ==
The circle was originally built as a large traffic circle in 1934. In 1958 an underpass was built to give motorists the option to skip the circle and continue on US 9. The underpass opened to traffic on December 12, 1958.

The traffic circle was remodeled in 2002 to have true roundabout characteristics. Prior to the 2002 work, the accident rate at the circle was about one per week, but were of low severity. After the reconstruction the accident rate dropped by 60%. The work on the circle included improving pavement markings, narrowing the US 9 access roads entering and exiting the circle to one lane, realigning the approaches from NY 2, reconfiguring the lanes within the circle, and improving signage. This work won the New York State Department of Transportation the 2003 National Roadway Safety Award.

Traffic counts for US 9 in 2002 and 2004 showed over 26,000 cars passing under the Latham Circle daily. Latham Circle's access roads formerly had two Texas U-turns, allowing for traffic on the access roads to cross US 9 to the opposite access road without passing through the circle.

The name Latham Circle has since been used in the name of many local businesses, including a shopping mall, soccer team, diner, and taxi service.
