= Babcock Lake (New York) =

- Location within New York Location within the United States
- Location: Rensselaer County, New York
- Coordinates: 42°49′2″N 73°23′57″W
- Type: Lake
- Surface elevation: 1,319 feet (402 m)

Babcock Lake is a lake in the U.S. state of New York.

Babcock Lake was named after "Honest" John Babcock, the supervisor of Grafton from 1819 to 1823 and 1825 to 1828.
