= New York State Route 2 (disambiguation) =

New York State Route 2 is an east–west state highway in Albany and Rensselaer Counties, New York, United States, that was established in the early 1940s.

New York State Route 2 may also refer to:

- New York State Route 2 (1924–1927) in Central New York and the North Country, 1924-1927, became US 11
- New York State Route 2 (1927–1939) in Steuben, Livingston, and Monroe Counties, 1927-1939, Now US 15, NY 15 and NY 415
- New York State Route 2 (1939–1942) in the Finger Lakes region, 1939-1942, became NY 96
