= Latham, New York =

Hamlet and CDP in New York, United States

- Census-designated place
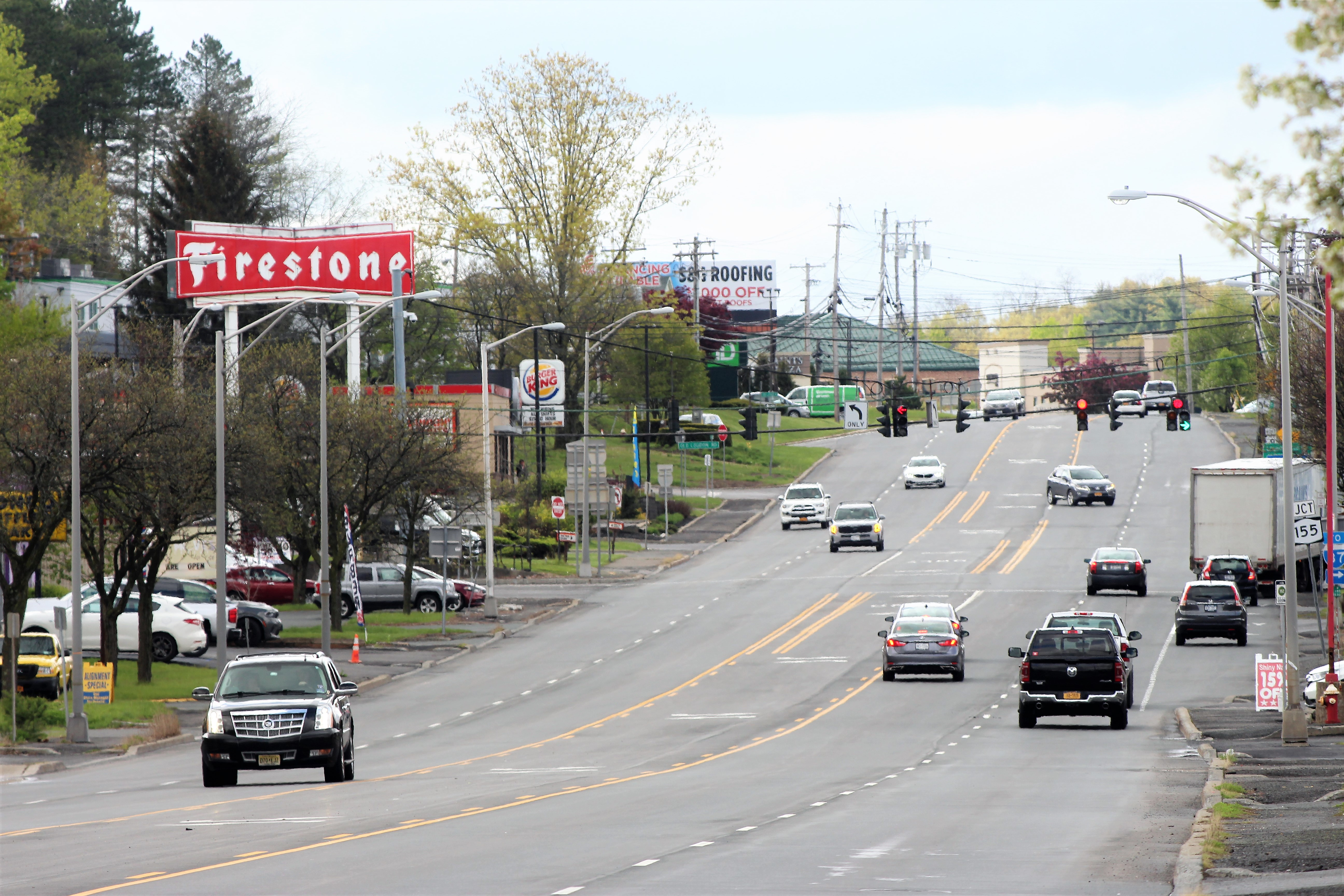

- Location within New York Location within the United States
- Coordinates: 42°44′49″N 73°45′32″W
- Country: United States
- State: New York
- Region: Capital District
- County: Albany
- Town: Colonie
- Named for: William G. Latham
- Elevation: 354 ft (108 m)

Population (2020)
  - Total: 13,680
- Time zone: UTC-5 (EST)
  - Summer (DST): UTC-4 (EDT)
- ZIP Codes: 12110 (Latham); 12189 (Watervliet)
- Area code: 518

Latham is a hamlet and census-designated place in Albany County, New York, United States. It is located along U.S. Route 9 in the town of Colonie, a dense suburb north of Albany. In addition, Interstate 87 and NY Route 7 also run through the town itself. As of the 2020 census, the population was 13,680. Latham was a census-designated place in the 1970, 1980, and 1990 US Censuses, but ceased to be in the 2000 Census, then became a CDP again in 2020.

== History ==
Latham Historical Populations
Year	Pop.	±%
1970	9,661	—
1980	11,182	+15.7%
1990	10,131	−9.4%
2000	12,378	+22.2%
2010	12,650	+2.2%
2020	13,680	+8.1%
Sources: Censuses 1970, 1980; 1990, as well as census listings for 2000, 2010, and 2020.

The area was known at different times in its history as Yearsley's (c. 1829), Van Vranken's (c. 1851), Town House Corners (c. 1860) and Latham's Corners, named after hotel owner William G. Latham. The "corner" referred to is now the intersection of Troy-Schenectady Road (NY Route 2) and Old Loudon Road.

Before European expansion to North America, Latham was occupied by Mohicans. The Old Loudon Road was built in 1755 during the French and Indian War to bring troops and provisions from Albany to the areas of Lake George and Ticonderoga. The Troy and Schenectady Turnpike was built in 1802 and intersected Old Loudon. An early first resident of this hamlet was Jonas Yearsley, 1785, who later built the first hotel close to this intersection. The hamlet was known first under the name of Yearsley's Corners and years afterward as Van Vrankens Corners in the 1850s. The name changed into Latham when William Latham became owner of the hotel. James, his son, continued to run the hotel until he died on August 14, 1933.

== Geography ==
The hamlet itself is very narrow east–west and relatively long north–south, centered on the intersection of the Troy-Schenectady Road and Old Loudon Road. As a hamlet, its boundaries are not clearly defined, though they are marked by the New York State Department of Transportation on the western and eastern ends on New York Route 2 and on the southern end on U.S. Route 9 (US 9). On the western end, the hamlet begins near the entrance to the former Latham Circle Mall; on the southern end it starts near the Y-intersection of US 9 and Old Loudon Road; and on the eastern end, the border is near the Kiwanis Park. The northern border is the Crescent Bridge crossing the Mohawk River into Halfmoon in Saratoga County. Blue Creek circles the area known as Pirate's Island. The area normally referred to as "Latham" extends well beyond the hamlet itself, as the name is also used for the post office of the 12110 ZIP Code. Many locations often considered in the northern and northeastern parts of Latham are in the Cohoes ZIP Code, while many in the eastern sections use a Watervliet ZIP Code.

Latham's terrain is mostly a hilly mix of deciduous and evergreen trees, with some ponds, creeks and swamps, including several protected water courses and New York State Wetlands. Streams east of Old Loudon Road and US 9 generally drain into the Hudson River; west of Old Loudon and US 9, the hamlet's watercourses drain into the Mohawk River.

== Demographics ==
=== 2020 census ===
As of the 2020 census, Latham had a population of 13,680. The median age was 43.5 years. 20.7% of residents were under the age of 18 and 20.2% of residents were 65 years of age or older. For every 100 females there were 88.7 males, and for every 100 females age 18 and over there were 83.9 males age 18 and over.

100.0% of residents lived in urban areas, while 0.0% lived in rural areas.

There were 5,541 households in Latham, of which 28.4% had children under the age of 18 living in them. Of all households, 49.4% were married-couple households, 15.3% were households with a male householder and no spouse or partner present, and 28.9% were households with a female householder and no spouse or partner present. About 30.5% of all households were made up of individuals and 15.0% had someone living alone who was 65 years of age or older.

There were 5,898 housing units, of which 6.1% were vacant. The homeowner vacancy rate was 1.7% and the rental vacancy rate was 8.5%.

Racial composition as of the 2020 census
Race	Number	Percent
White	10,026	73.3%
Black or African American	658	4.8%
American Indian and Alaska Native	27	0.2%
Asian	1,958	14.3%
Native Hawaiian and Other Pacific Islander	5	0.0%
Some other race	178	1.3%
Two or more races	828	6.1%
Hispanic or Latino (of any race)	515	3.8%

== Notable people ==
- Jeff Hoffman, pitcher for the Minnesota Twins
- Tommy Kahnle, pitcher for the Boston Red Sox
- Sam Perkins, played for four teams during a 17-year career in the National Basketball Association
- Jeff Spraker, NASCAR driver and crew chief
- David Wu, American politician
- Ron Vawter, actor

== See also ==
- Reformed Dutch Church (1817)
