= New York State Route 2 =

State highway in eastern New York, US

New York State Route 2
- Map of the Capital District of New York with NY 2 highlighted in red, and NY 914A in blue

Route information
- Maintained by NYSDOT and the cities of Watervliet and Troy
- Length: 30.81 mi (49.58 km)
- Existed: 1942–present
- History: Designated NY 96 in 1930;

Major junctions
- West end: I-87 / NY 7 in Latham
- US 9 in Latham; US 4 in Troy; NY 22 in Petersburgh
- East end: Route 2 in Williamstown, MA

Location
- Country: United States
- State: New York
- Counties: Albany, Rensselaer

Highway system
- New York Highways; Interstate; US; State; Reference; Parkways
← US 2	→ NY 3

New York State Route 2 (NY 2) is a state highway in the Capital District of New York in the United States. It extends for 30.89 miles (49.71 km) from an interchange with Interstate 87 (I-87) and NY 7 in the town of Colonie to the Massachusetts state line in Petersburgh, where it continues to Boston as Massachusetts Route 2. The route passes through the cities of Watervliet and Troy, where it connects to NY 32 and U.S. Route 4, respectively. In Grafton, located midway between Troy and Massachusetts, NY 2 serves Grafton Lakes State Park.

Most of the route was originally designated as part of an unsigned legislative route in the 1910s. In 1924, the portion of modern NY 2 between the hamlet of Latham and downtown Troy became part of NY 9. The rest of the highway was designated as NY 96 as part of the 1930 renumbering of state highways in New York. NY 96 was renumbered to NY 2 in 1942. From 1942 to 1970, NY 2 continued south along the Hudson River from Troy to Albany. It was extended to Latham in 1985, replacing a section of NY 7 that had been realigned onto a new parallel freeway to the north.

== Route description ==
=== Albany County and Troy ===
NY 2 begins at I-87 (the Adirondack Northway) exit 6 in the hamlet of Latham, where NY 7 leaves Troy–Schenectady Road to join I-87. The route proceeds east on Troy–Schenectady Road, a four-lane boulevard in the town of Colonie. Passing south of the Latham Farms Shopping Center, and soon north of the Latham Circle Mall, the route enters Latham Circle, where it connects to US 9 (Loudon Road). Instead of directly intersecting US 9, NY 2 meets a series of ramps leading to and from the road while US 9 itself crosses under the circle, allowing for a continuous flow of traffic on US 9. East of US 9, NY 2 runs southeast through Colonie, serving residential neighborhoods and a short commercialized stretch on its way into the riverside city of Watervliet, where it becomes 19th Street. Two blocks into the city, maintenance of the route shifts from the New York State Department of Transportation (NYSDOT) to the city highway department.

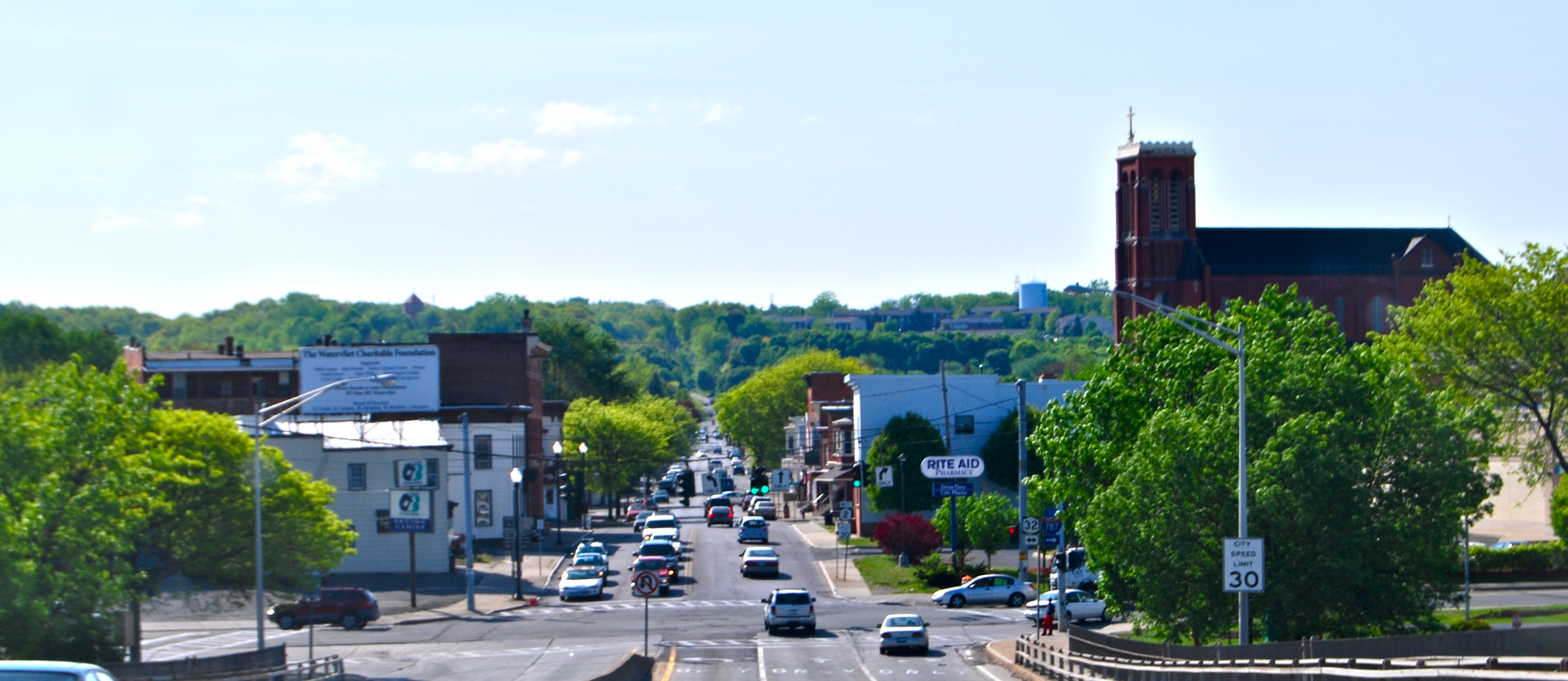
NY 2 westbound approaching the city of Watervliet

The highway initially serves three blocks of homes before entering a linear commercial district at a junction with 12th Avenue. From here, the road crosses a Canadian Pacific Railway line as it approaches downtown Watervliet, where state maintenance resumes one block west of an intersection with NY 32 (Second Avenue). Past NY 32, NY 2 crosses over I-787 and the Hudson River on the Congress Street Bridge, which links Watervliet to the city of Troy on the opposite bank. Just east of the bridge, the route enters a partial interchange with Front Street and splits into a one-way pair along Congress Street (westbound) and Ferry Street (eastbound), both two lanes wide. The couplet takes the route through the Central Troy Historic District, where NY 2 eastbound heads into a two-block tunnel that carries the highway underneath the campus of Russell Sage College.

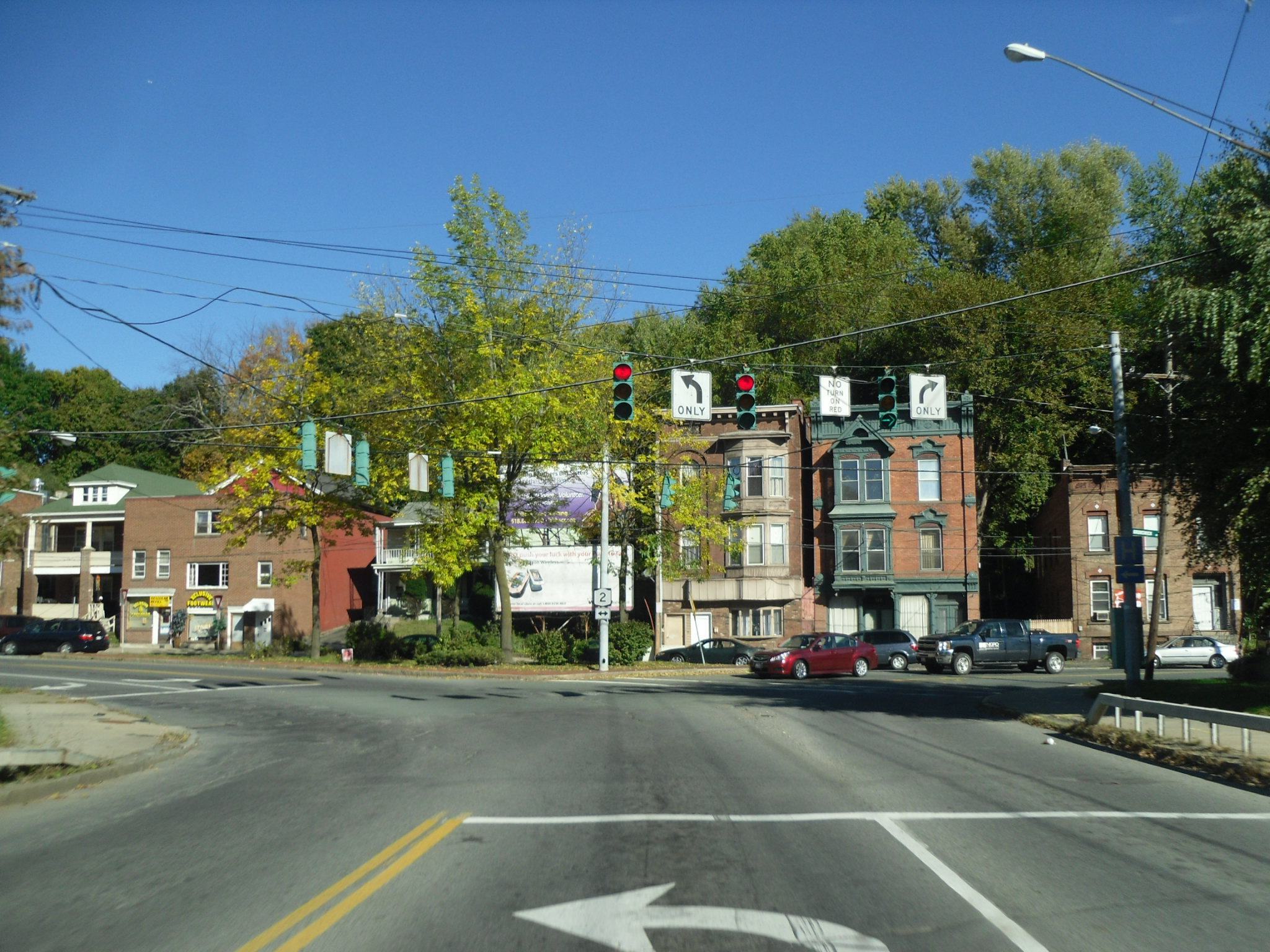
NY 2 at NY 66 as seen from NY 66 in Troy

Ferry Street returns to surface level at 3rd Street, where NY 2 meets the southbound half of US 4, which is also routed along a one-way pair through the city. A junction with US 4 northbound follows two blocks to the east at 4th Street. While most of NY 2 westbound is city-maintained in Troy, NY 2 eastbound is a state road up through its intersection with 5th Avenue. After 5th Avenue, the highway leaves downtown Troy and begins to climb the hills overlooking the city. Near the Rensselaer Polytechnic Institute, Ferry and Congress streets merge to form a single two-lane road carrying the Congress Street name. The route runs southeastward from the merge, serving another commercial strip in the Eastside section of the city and connecting to the northern terminus of NY 66 (Pawling Avenue).

=== East of Troy ===
Past NY 66, NY 2 changes names to Brunswick Road and turns northeastward through a residential section of Troy. It loosely parallels the northern edge of Poesten Kill to the Troy city line, where the highway reaches the southern terminus of County Route 141 (CR 141 or South Lake Avenue). State maintenance of NY 2 resumes as the road heads into the town of Brunswick, where the homes along the highway become less frequent and more scattered. The route runs past occasional stretches of dense woods to reach the hamlet of Eagle Mills, where it intersects with the eastern terminus of CR 140 (Pinewoods Avenue) and the south end of CR 133 (Moonlawn Road). Outside of Eagle Mills, development along NY 2 continues to dwindle as it takes a more northerly track through the town. It bends back to the east near Clums Corners, the site of intersections with the southern terminus of NY 278 (Brick Church Road) and the northern terminus of NY 351 (Farm to Market Road).

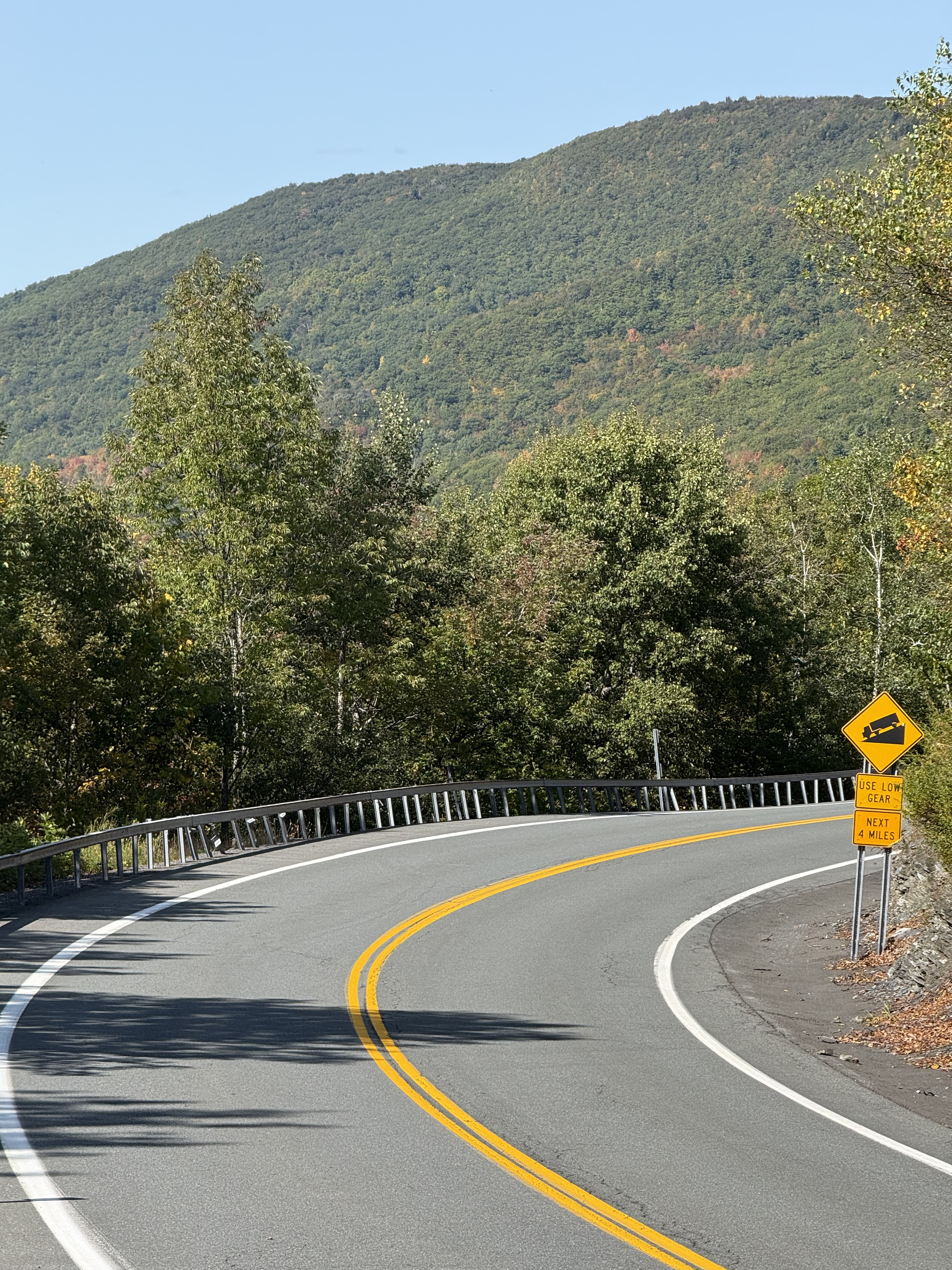
View west along NY 2 beginning to descend from Petersburgh Pass in Petersburgh

East of Clums Corners, NY 2 loses the Brunswick Road name as it heads northeast through increasingly rural areas along the Quacken Kill. The route crosses the western terminus of CR 79 (Blue Factory Road) along this stretch before winding back to the southeast at the Grafton town line. It soon takes a more easterly track through Grafton, intersecting both ends of CR 84 (Old Road) on its way into the residential hamlet of Grafton. The route connects to Grafton Lakes State Park Way, the main road leading into Grafton Lakes State Park, and the northern terminus of CR 85 (South Road) before leaving the community. From the hamlet of Grafton, NY 2 winds southeast through rural sections of the town of Grafton, slowly heading downhill toward the Grafton–Petersburgh town line. In Petersburgh, the highway meets the southern terminus of CR 94 (Dill Brook Road) on its way into the hamlet of Petersburgh.

In the center of the community, NY 2 connects to NY 22 by way of Moses Road (eastbound) and Main Street (westbound), both designated as NY 914A, an unsigned reference route. NY 2 itself crosses over NY 22, taking on the Main Street name as it runs through the center of Petersburgh. Past the hamlet, the route changes names to Taconic Trail as it meanders southeastward through rural, mostly wooded sections of Petersburgh. NY 2 intersects both ends of CR 91 (East Hollow Road) before traversing dense woods in the Taconic Mountains. The road takes a generally south-southeastward track to the Massachusetts state line, where it becomes Massachusetts Route 2 upon entering the town of Williamstown, Massachusetts.

== History ==
Most of modern NY 2 east of 1st Street in Troy was originally designated by the New York State Legislature as Route 42, an unsigned legislative route, on July 7, 1911. East of Troy, however, Route 42 was routed on Pawling and Pinewoods avenues. Route 42 was extended west across the Hudson River to Schenectady in 1914 by way of what is now NY 2 and NY 7. When the first set of posted routes in New York were assigned in 1924, the portion of Route 42 west of 1st Street became part of NY 9. The rest of Route 42 remained unnumbered until the 1930 renumbering of state highways in New York, when it was designated as NY 96. Near Troy, NY 96 bypassed Pawling and Pinewoods avenues to the north on Brunswick Road instead of following the path of Route 42.

In Petersburgh, NY 96 originally had a brief overlap with NY 22; however, it was eliminated in 1931 when NY 96 was reconfigured to pass over NY 22 by way of a new bridge built midway between NY 96's original approaches to the route. The former alignments of NY 96 were subsequently repurposed as connectors between NY 22 and NY 96. Both roads, a combined 0.41 miles (0.66 km) in length, are now designated as NY 914A, an unsigned reference route. In 1942, the state of New York switched the alignments of NY 96 and NY 2, a highway extending from Owego to Rochester in the Finger Lakes region. The change placed NY 2 on the Troy–Massachusetts routing.

Around the same time as the designation swap, NY 2 was extended south to NY 5 in Albany by way of overlaps with US 4, then routed on 1st Street, and NY 32. In between the two routes, NY 2 was routed on modern NY 378 and crossed the Hudson River by way of the Troy–Menands Bridge. NY 2 was rerouted slightly in the early 1950s to leave NY 32 at the junction of Wolfert Avenue and Broadway and follow Broadway into downtown Albany, where it ended at Madison Avenue (US 9 and US 20). The route was truncated to the northern end of the NY 32 overlap in the mid-1960s, then to 3rd Street (US 4) in Troy on January 1, 1970. The former routing of NY 2 between NY 32 and US 4 became an extension of NY 378.

Construction on a new limited-access highway through the town of Colonie between I-87 and I-787 began in the early 1980s. The roadway, known as "NY 7 Alternate", was built 1 mile (1.6 km) north of NY 7 on an alignment that paralleled the original surface route. However, when it opened in December 1985, it became a realignment of NY 7 instead. NY 7's former surface routing from I-87 in Latham to US 4 in Troy became a westward extension of NY 2.

== Major intersections ==
County	Location	mi	km	Destinations	Notes
Albany	Colonie	0.00	0.00	I-87 / NY 7 (Troy Schnectady Road) – Albany, Saratoga Springs	Western terminus; single-point urban interchange; exit 6 on I-87
Albany	Colonie	0.51	0.82	US 9 – Albany, Saratoga	Latham Circle
Albany	Watervliet	3.80	6.12	NY 32 (Second Avenue) to I-787 – Cohoes, Green Island	
Hudson River		4.04	6.50	Congress Street Bridge	
Rensselaer	Troy	4.37	7.03	US 4 south (Third Street) – Rensselaer	One-way couplet
Rensselaer	Troy	4.44	7.15	US 4 north (Fourth Street) – Lansingburgh	One-way couplet
Rensselaer	Troy	5.38	8.66	NY 66 south (Pawling Avenue) – Wynantskill	Northern terminus of NY 66
Rensselaer	Brunswick	11.69	18.81	NY 278 north to NY 7	Southern terminus of NY 278; hamlet of Clums Corners
Rensselaer	Brunswick	12.15	19.55	NY 351 south – Poestenkill	Northern terminus of NY 351; hamlet of Cropseyville
Rensselaer	Grafton	18.59	29.92	Grafton Lakes State Park	
Rensselaer	Petersburgh	25.02	40.27	To NY 22 – Berlin, Hoosick Falls	Interchange; access via NY 914A; hamlet of Petersburg
Rensselaer	Petersburgh	30.81	49.58	Route 2 east	Continuation into Massachusetts
1.000 mi = 1.609 km; 1.000 km = 0.621 mi
