= Little Red Schoolhouse (Brunswick, New York) =

- District No. 1 Schoolhouse
- U.S. National Register of Historic Places
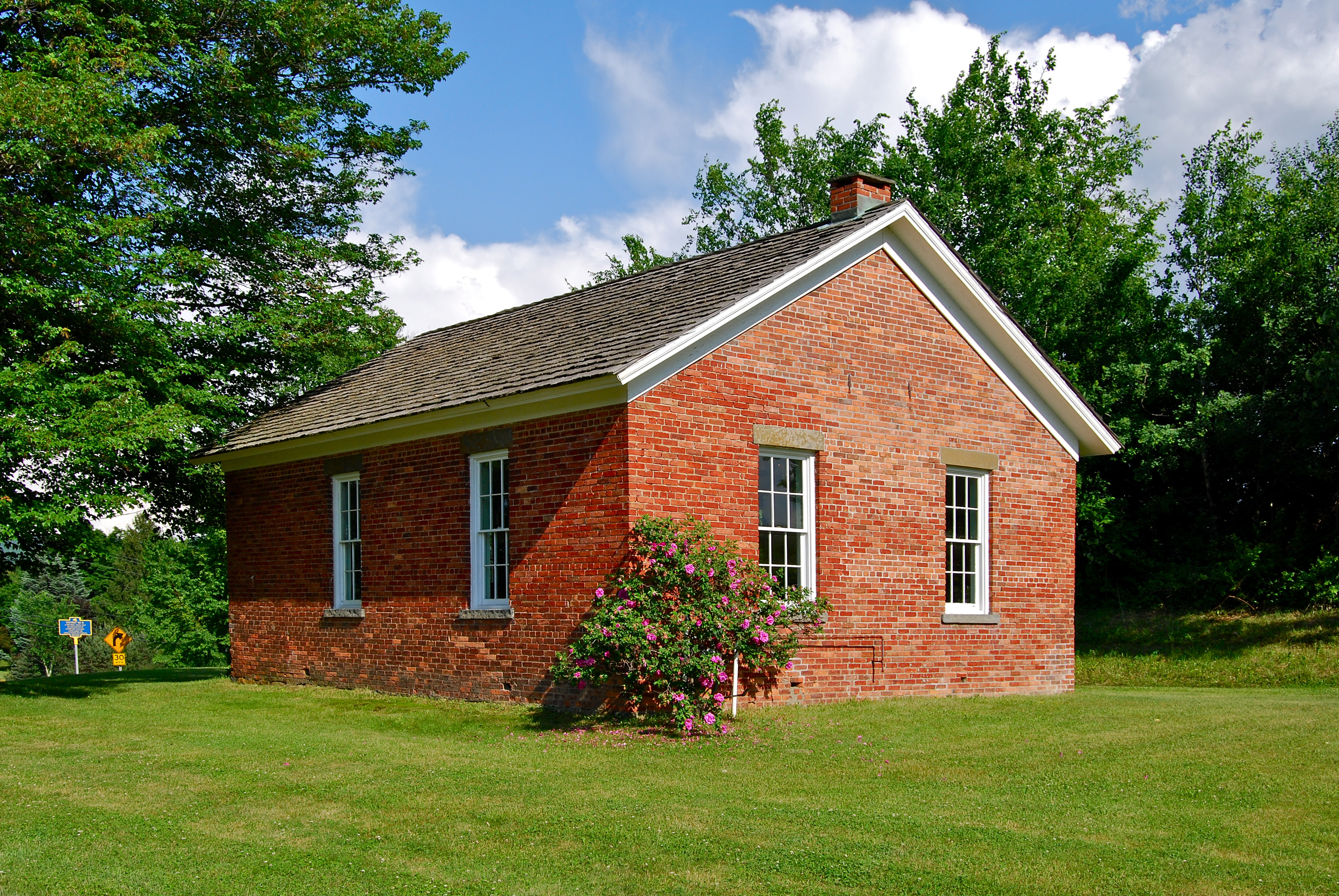
- View from the north, 2009

- Location within New York
- Location: Clums Corners, North Greenbush, New York
- Nearest city: Troy
- Coordinates: 42°45′4.29″N 73°34′28.8″W
- Area: Less than 1 acre (0.40 ha)
- Built: c. 1830 or 1837
- Architectural style: Greek Revival
- NRHP reference No.: 08000582
- Added to NRHP: July 3, 2008

The District #6 Schoolhouse, also known locally as the Little Red Schoolhouse located in Brunswick, New York, United States, is a one-room schoolhouse built c. 1830 or 1837 that was home to grades one through eight until the consolidation of Brunswick (Brittonkill) Central School District in 1952. It was added to the National Register of Historic Places (NRHP) on July 3, 2008 and a dedication ceremony for the accomplishment was held on June 12, 2009.

The building, located on New York Route 278, is still owned by Brunswick Central School District. It is believed to be one of the oldest remaining schoolhouses in Rensselaer County.

== History ==
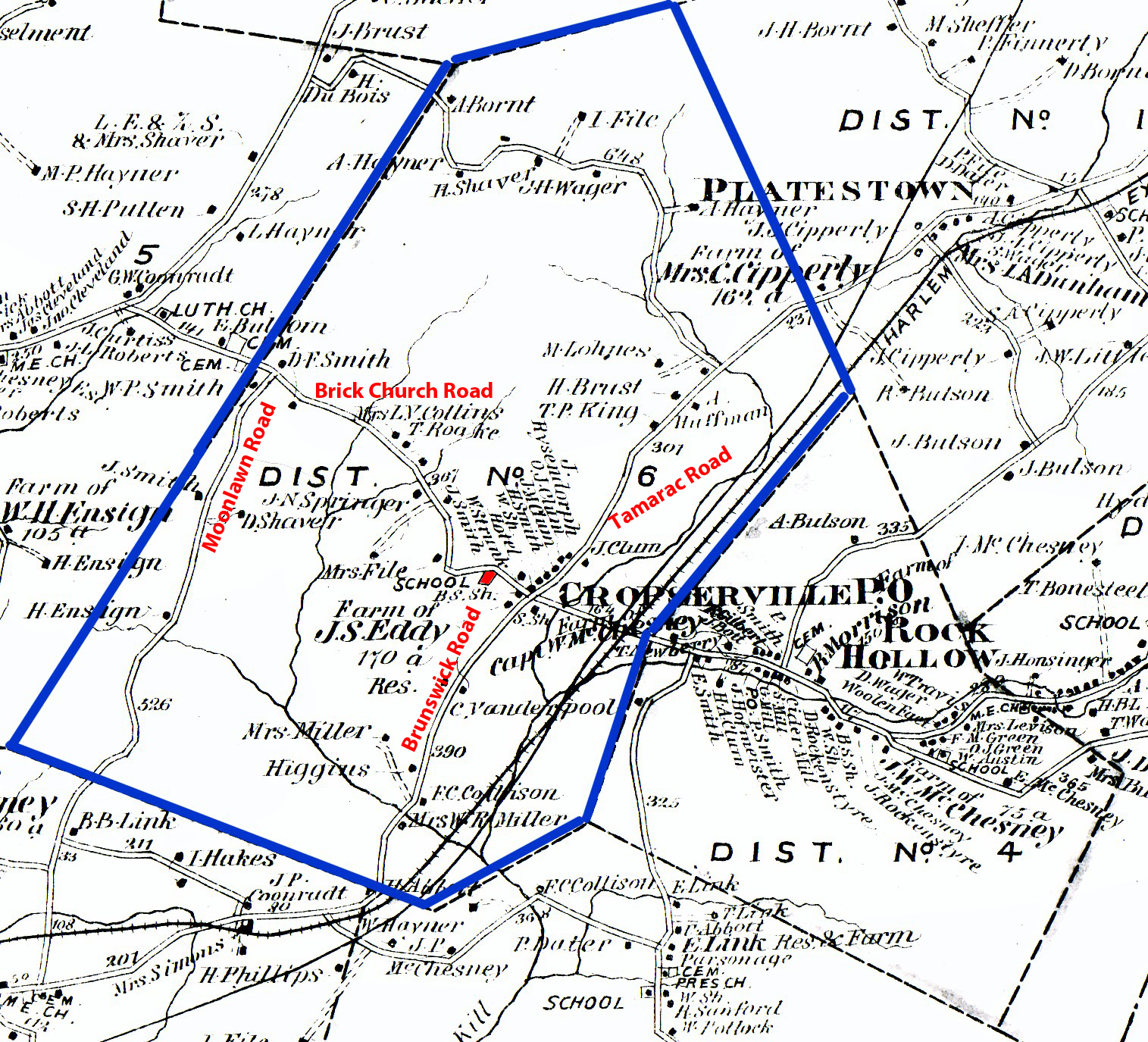
Map of the original District #6

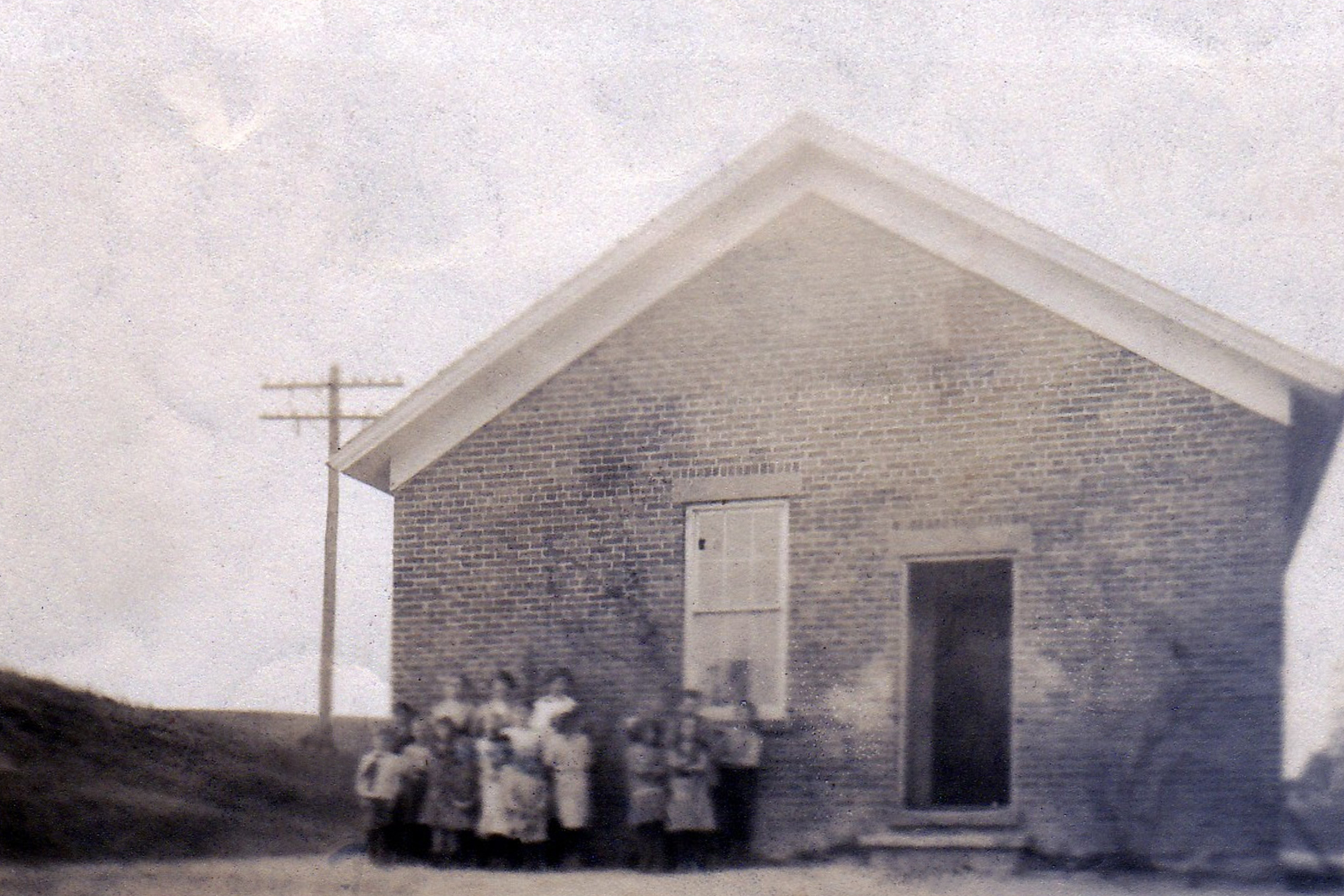
The schoolhouse in 1913

The schoolhouse was built either in 1830 or 1837—though sources disagree on which—and served as a local grade school for more than a century. It hosted children ranging from grade one to eight together in one classroom. The district was centered around Clums Corners and was originally designated District 11 until being renamed District 6 sometime between 1854 and 1862.

The structure was built on land donated by Luther and Olive Eddy, who owned a large tract of farmland adjacent to the current lot. Luther Eddy later became the first town superintendent for education in 1844.

After the consolidation of Brunswick Central School District in the 1950s, the school was closed. At one point, it was reopened for a year to accommodate the large student population on the new school's campus.

It was later used as a garage by the school district. The west wall was removed to accommodate vehicles. After that, it was used as a storage house by the district.

During the 1970s, the exterior of the building was restored by the local Kiwanis, including replacing the west wall which had been removed. The building was then used by the Brunswick Historical Society as a museum. By 2007, most of the interior was refurbished by donations of time and materials from local residents.

Beginning in the mid-2000s (decade), an effort was made by the Brunswick Town Historian to add the site to National Register of Historic Places. This would be the second former schoolhouse in the town to be listed on the NRHP, the Garfield School being the first. Following an interior restoration that was completed in 2007, the site was added to the register on July 3, 2008, as District No. 6 Schoolhouse.
