= Clums Corners, New York =

Clums Corners
- hamlet
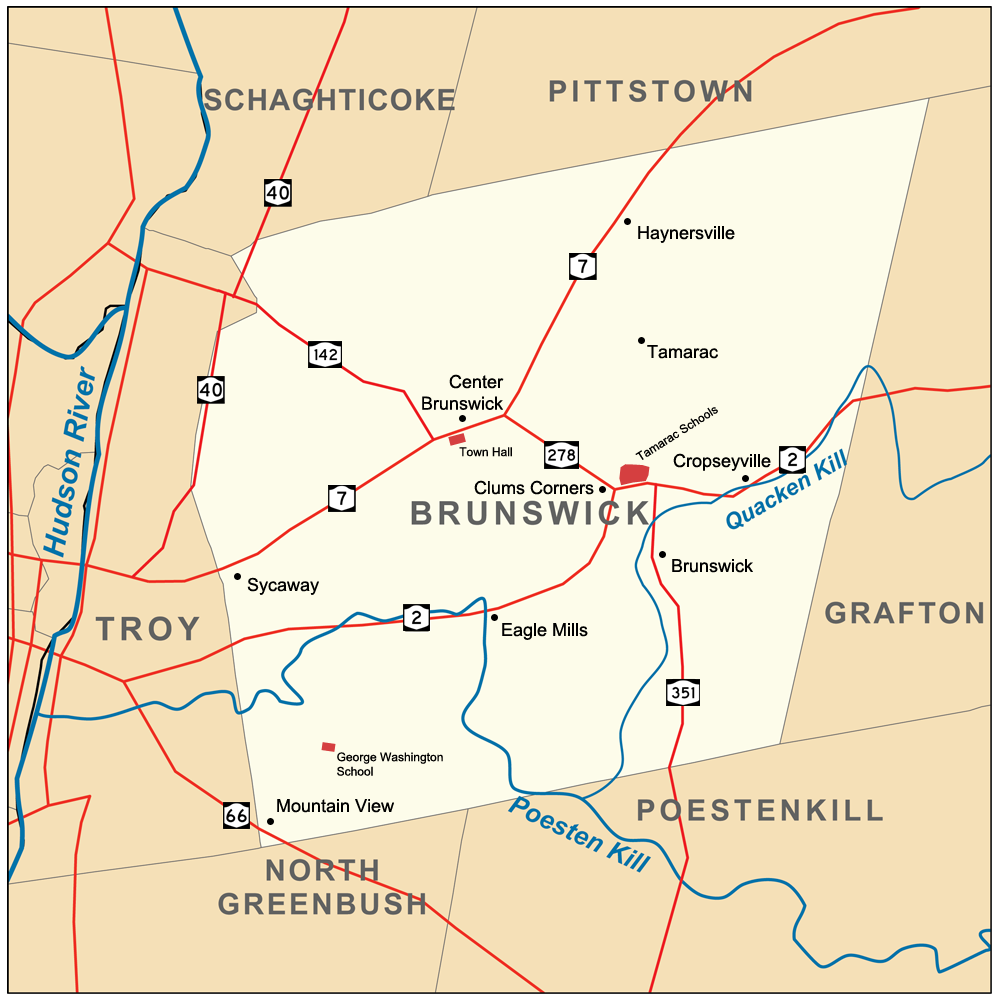
- Map of Brunswick and its major thoroughfares, with Clums Corners labeled

- Location within New York
- Coordinates: 42°45′02″N 73°34′19″W
- Country: United States
- State: New York
- County: Rensselaer
- Town: Brunswick
- Settled: Late 1700s
- Time zone: UTC-5 (Eastern (EST))
  - Summer (DST): UTC-4 (EDT)
- ZIP code: 12180
- Area code: 518

Clums Corners is a hamlet in the town of Brunswick in Rensselaer County, New York, United States. It is located at the intersection of New York Route 2 (Brunswick Road), New York Route 278 (Brick Church Road), and Tamarac Road (County Route 129). Tamarac Secondary and Elementary Schools are located nearby. The site is so named for the Clum family—specifically James Clum and later his son Orlin—who ran a blacksmith shop during the late 19th century and early 20th century.

The area was serviced by the Little Red Schoolhouse—known officially as the Brunswick District No. 6 Schoolhouse—until it was closed in 1958, upon the consolidation of Brunswick (Brittonkill) Central School District and the opening of Tamarac School.

The area was mostly farmland until the building of the school on the north side of Route 2 and then the strip mall Tamarac Plaza, the former King Fuel's gas station (now Cobble Pond), and the Rensselaer County Association for Retarded Children were built on the south side. Prior to this development, the area was known as Clum's Flats and was a popular place to race horses on Sunday afternoons.

== Bibliography ==
- Zankel, Sharon Martin (1998). Images of America: Brunswick. Arcadia Publishing/Brunswick Historical Society. ISBN 0-7524-1306-6.
