= Brunswick Historical Society =

- Founded: 1974 (1981 charter)
- Type: Historical society
- Purpose: Local history
- Location(s): 605 Brunswick Road; Troy, New York 12180
- Region served: Town of Brunswick
- Method: Collecting, preserving, and displaying historically significant aspects of Brunswick
- Key people: President Tracy Broderick
- Website: bhs-ny.org
- Member of Upstate History Alliance, American Association of State and Local History, and Hudson-Mohawk Industrial Gateway

Brunswick Historical Society (BHS) is the local historical society serving the town of Brunswick, New York, United States. It was organized in 1974 and officially chartered in 1981. It moved into its first and current home, the Garfield School in Eagle Mills, in 1988. After sharing the Garfield School with the Brunswick Community Library (originally the Garfield Reading Center) for more than twenty years, the Library moved to a different location in 2009 and in 2010, BHS expanded into both halves of the former two-room schoolhouse.

== History ==
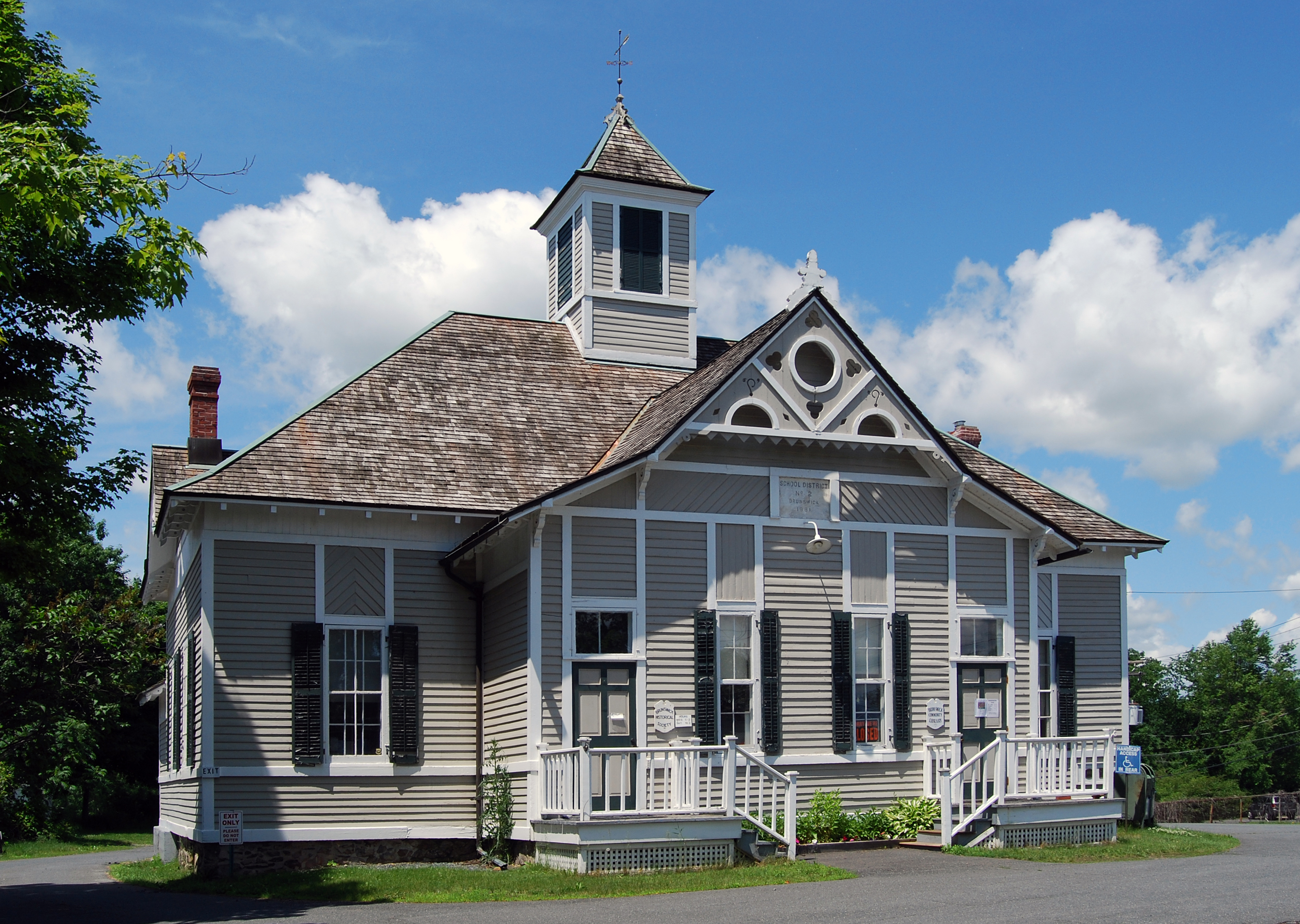
Brunswick Historical Society has called the Garfield School home since 1988.

In 1974, a group of interested Brunswick residents invited other townspeople to a meeting to discuss the possibility of organizing a society aimed at studying and collecting items related to local history since there appeared to be a great interest around town in forming such a group. Meetings were scheduled and in the fall of that year, charter memberships were issued. On May 22, 1981, BHS was granted its absolute charter by the New York State Board of Regents, making BHS a recognized and official local historical society.

The purpose of BHS was to bring together people interested in history, and especially in the history of the town of Brunswick and of Rensselaer County. Also, the society collects, preserves, displays, and makes available for study any material that will establish or illustrate the history of the area. BHS encourages the preservation and accessibility of records and archives of the area and encourages and promotes the preservation of historical buildings, monuments, and markers of local importance.

In 1978, Brunswick... A Pictorial History was published care of editor Warren Broderick. Old Brunswick photographs were loaned for inclusion in the book. Thus began the extensive collection of photographs and slides now in its archives. These media have been used for exhibits, programs at BHS meetings, and educational programs for Brunswick school children.

In 1981, BHS was officially recognized by the New York State Board of Regents and New York State Education Department with an absolute charter. The society has continued to collect artifacts, memorabilia, family records, scrapbooks, and diaries kept by town residents.

In 1988, BHS moved into its current home, the Garfield School on the corner of Brunswick Road (New York State Route 2) and Moonlawn Road. Extensive renovations were made to the building to bring it to a suitable standard for visiting researchers and other parties interested in what BHS had to offer. The school was originally the District No. 2 Schoolhouse, which serviced Eagle Mills from its construction in 1881 until the consolidation of the Brunswick (Brittonkill) Central School District in 1956. The school had been used occasionally by the school district after consolidation, but it had effectively been abandoned until the district transferred it to the Town of Brunswick in 1986. In 1988, the Garfield School became the first building to be added to the National Register of Historical Places in the town of Brunswick. In 2009, after more than 20 years sharing the building, the Brunswick Community Library moved to a new location east of the Garfield Library. In response, BHS expanded its operation into the entire Garfield School. In 2010, an extensive renovation was performed, including refinishing the wood floors and installing new cabinets and display cases.

== Governance ==
BHS is overseen by a 13-member board of trustees. As required by its charter, BHS "continually meets the requirements of the Board of Regents, including research, collections management, and providing programs and interpretive activities for the educational benefit of the public." It is a non-profit 501(c)(3) educational organization and is a member of the Upstate History Alliance, the American Association of State and Local History, and the Hudson-Mohawk Industrial Gateway.

=== Committees ===
BHS has a number of committees meant to consolidate work efforts and involve participants. Its Collections Committee keeps track of all the items collected since the society's inception. The Exhibits Committee develops new display ideas for much of its collections. The Genealogy Committee was worked to consolidate family history information for interested researchers. Other committees include the Historic Building Marker Committee, the History Committee, the Junior Historian Society, the Hospitality Committee, the Membership Committee, the Newsletter Committee, the Programs Committee, the Publicity Committee, the Volunteer Committee, and the Website Committee.
