= Brunswick (Brittonkill) Central School District =

School district in New York, United States

Coordinates: 42°45′2.5″N 73°34′1.7″W

Location
- 3992 NY Route 2 Troy, New York, 12180; United States

District information
- Type: Public central school district
- Motto: Quality life, quality education
- Grades: Pre-K—12
- Established: 1956
- Superintendent: Angelina Maloney
- Budget: $21,283,515
- NCES District ID: 3605520

Students and staff
- Students: 1363
- Faculty: 100.7 (on FTE basis)
- Staff: 53
- Student–teacher ratio: 13.7
- Athletic conference: Wasaren League
- District mascot: Bengal tiger
- Colors: Red and white

Other information
- Website: www.brunswickcsd.org

Brunswick (Brittonkill) Central School District (BCSD) is a rural fringe central school district located east of the city of Troy whose main campus resides in the town of Brunswick in Rensselaer County, New York, United States. The district has two operating school buildings: Tamarac Elementary School (Pre-K through 5) and Tamarac Secondary School (6 through 12). The district is a member of the Rensselaer-Columbia-Greene Boards of Cooperative Educational Services (BOCES), known as Questar III.

The district was created upon the centralization (consolidation) of fourteen smaller districts in Brunswick, Pittstown, Grafton, and Poestenkill in 1956 and the high school opened in 1958. The first class graduated in 1960. The district had a combined student body of 1363 during the 2007–2008 school year.

== History ==
The district was created upon the centralization (consolidation) of local schools in 1956. Previously, Brunswick was serviced by twelve smaller districts, each usually made up of one single-room schoolhouse. Of those previous districts, only two of the original buildings exist in their original state.

=== Pre-centralization ===
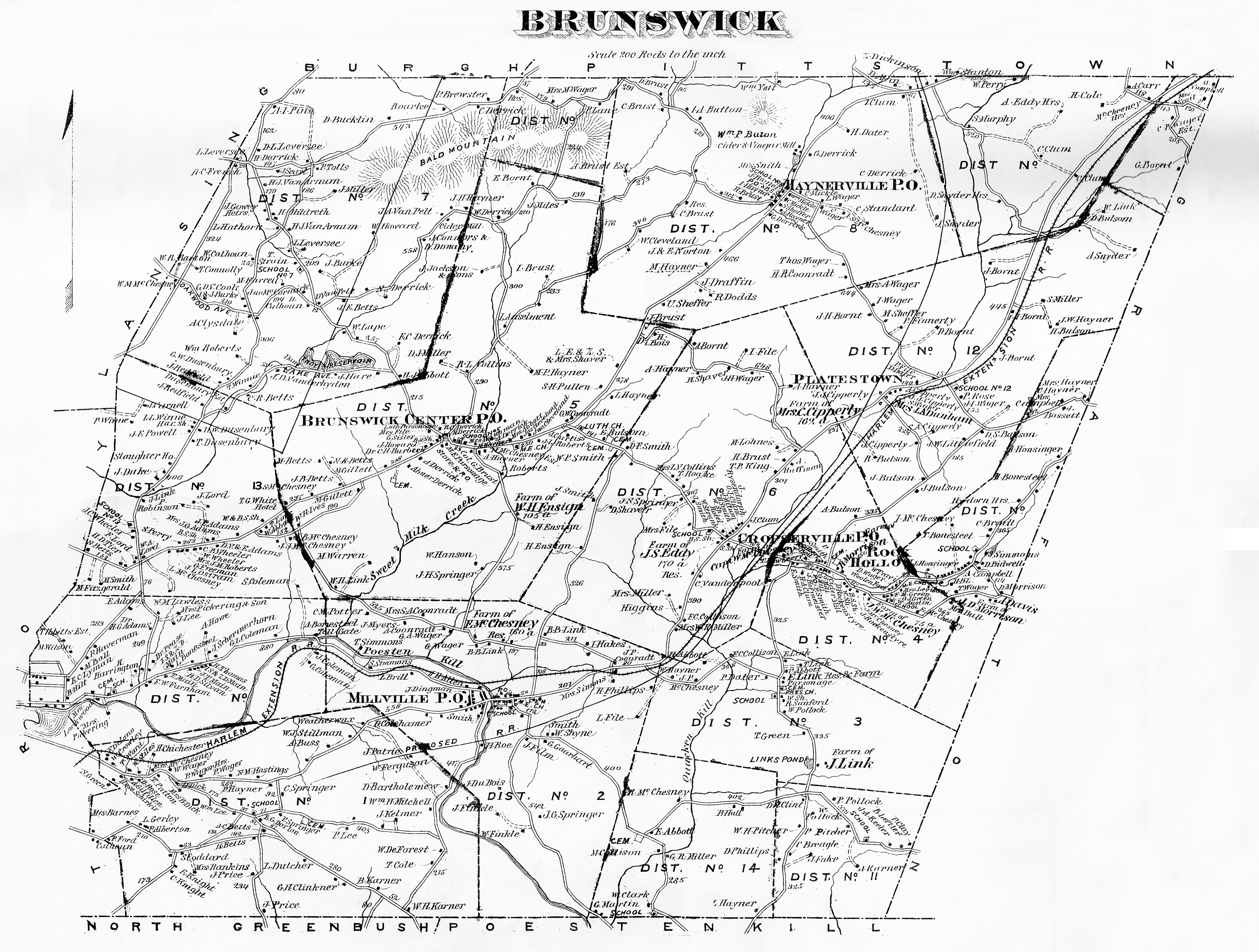
Map of Brunswick featuring school district boundaries in 1876

Upon the creation of the government of the Town of Brunswick in April 1807, three commissioners of schools were appointed. Their tasks were to develop schools within the town and offer funding using the Common School Fund, which the New York State Legislature had set up in 1805 to help cover the costs of public education. In 1812, the legislature developed a school district system in which each district was self-governing. These districts were typically small by necessity, so that students could walk or ride to school in a reasonable time period each day.

At the time, public schools were funded by a combination of population-based state reimbursement, taxes, and tuition paid by parents. In 1867, tuition was abolished, making public education free to all. At that time, attending school was voluntary, but by 1874, it became mandatory for students aged 8 to 14. Enforcement was sometimes difficult though, especially considering the agricultural economy that the area depended upon at the time.

By 1945, ten districts in Brunswick had a student population of 313 between first and ninth grades. Due to the added expenses of small districts (in an era becoming increasingly dominated by the automobile) and sometimes crumbling school facilities, the idea of consolidating smaller districts into one larger district (centralization) became a legitimate issue. By 1953, fourteen districts in Brunswick, Grafton, Pittstown, and Poestenkill were proposed for centralization. Eight of the districts were serviced by one-room schoolhouses with no running water.

=== Districts preceding centralization ===
At the time just preceding centralization, Brunswick was served by twelve districts.

District #1 is located at the corner of Menemsha and Lansing Lanes and was commonly known as the Paul Springer School. The original schoolhouse was built in 1885 but burned down in 1970. The district became known as Brunswick Common School District after the Brunswick Central School District centralization. In the 1960s, students from the elementary school (the only building in the district) voted to name the school George Washington School. The district remained independent until merging into Averill Park Central School District in 1995.

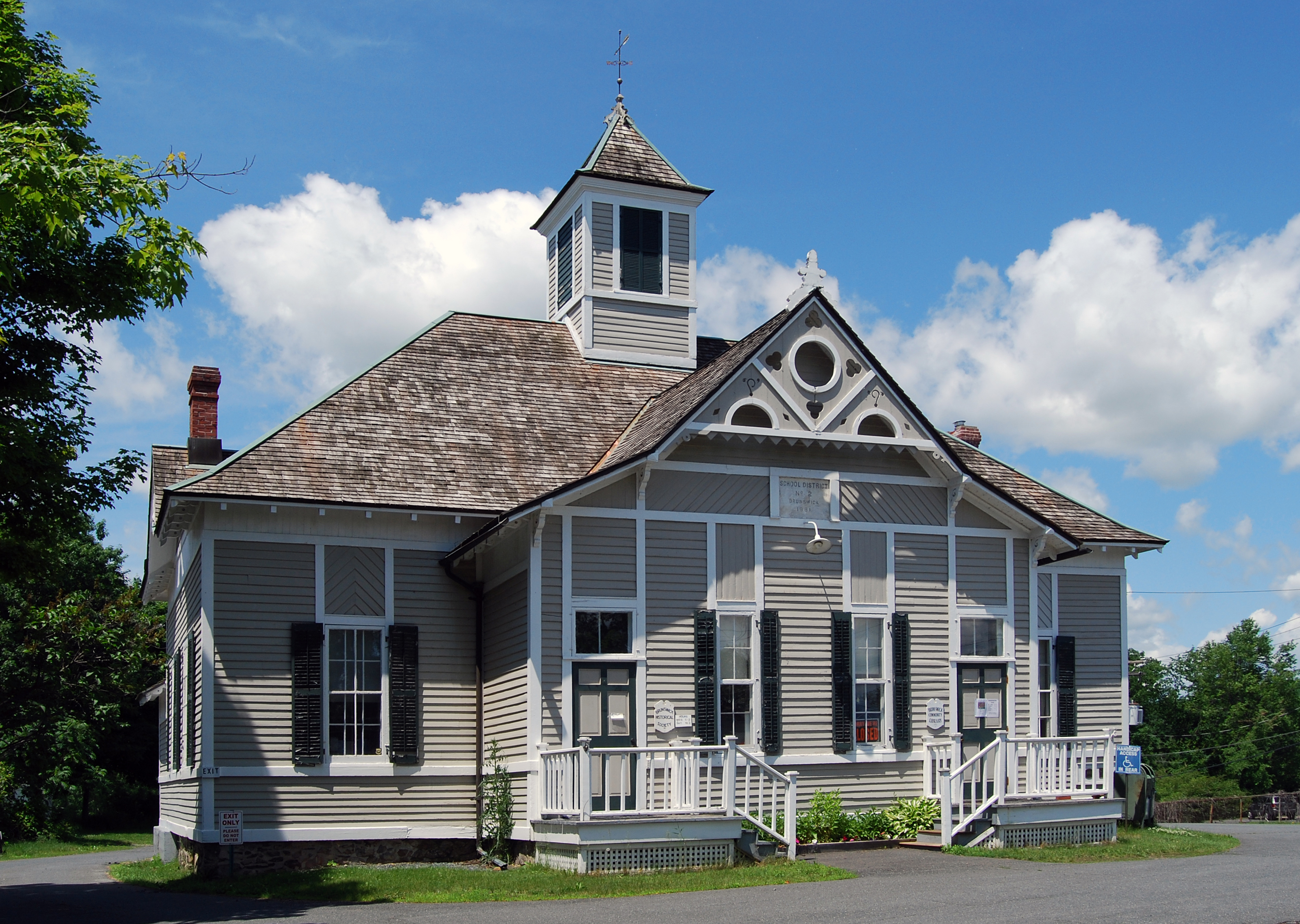
Garfield School

District #2, known as the Garfield School, is located at the corner of Moonlawn Road and New York State Route 2 (Brunswick Road). The school was originally named for President James A. Garfield, who occasionally taught nearby. It was owned by BCSD until the mid-1980s when it was transferred to the Town of Brunswick. It currently houses the Brunswick Community Library and Brunswick Historical Society and was added to the National Register of Historic Places in 1988.

District #3 was known as the White Church School or the Horace Mann School. Little more information is easily found about the school.

District #4, known as the Pleasant Valley School, Rock Hollow School, or Cropseyville School, was located in the Pleasant Valley sector of Cropseyville on Brunswick Rd. This school was built in 1889 as a replacement for two nearby schools: one near the site of this school, and one on South Road. Today the building is a private residence.

District #5 was originally serviced by the McKinley School, located on New York State Route 7 (Hoosick Road), east of New York State Route 142 (Grange Road), and west of Town Office Road. The building was built around 1872 and the building still stands, housing a local business. The replacement schoolhouse, known as the Lee School, was located at Keyes Lane and Merrill Avenue. It was constructed in 1953 but soon closed due to centralization. It was then sold to the Brunswick Center Fire Department and used as a banquet hall until it was demolished in 1997 to be replaced by a new town community center.

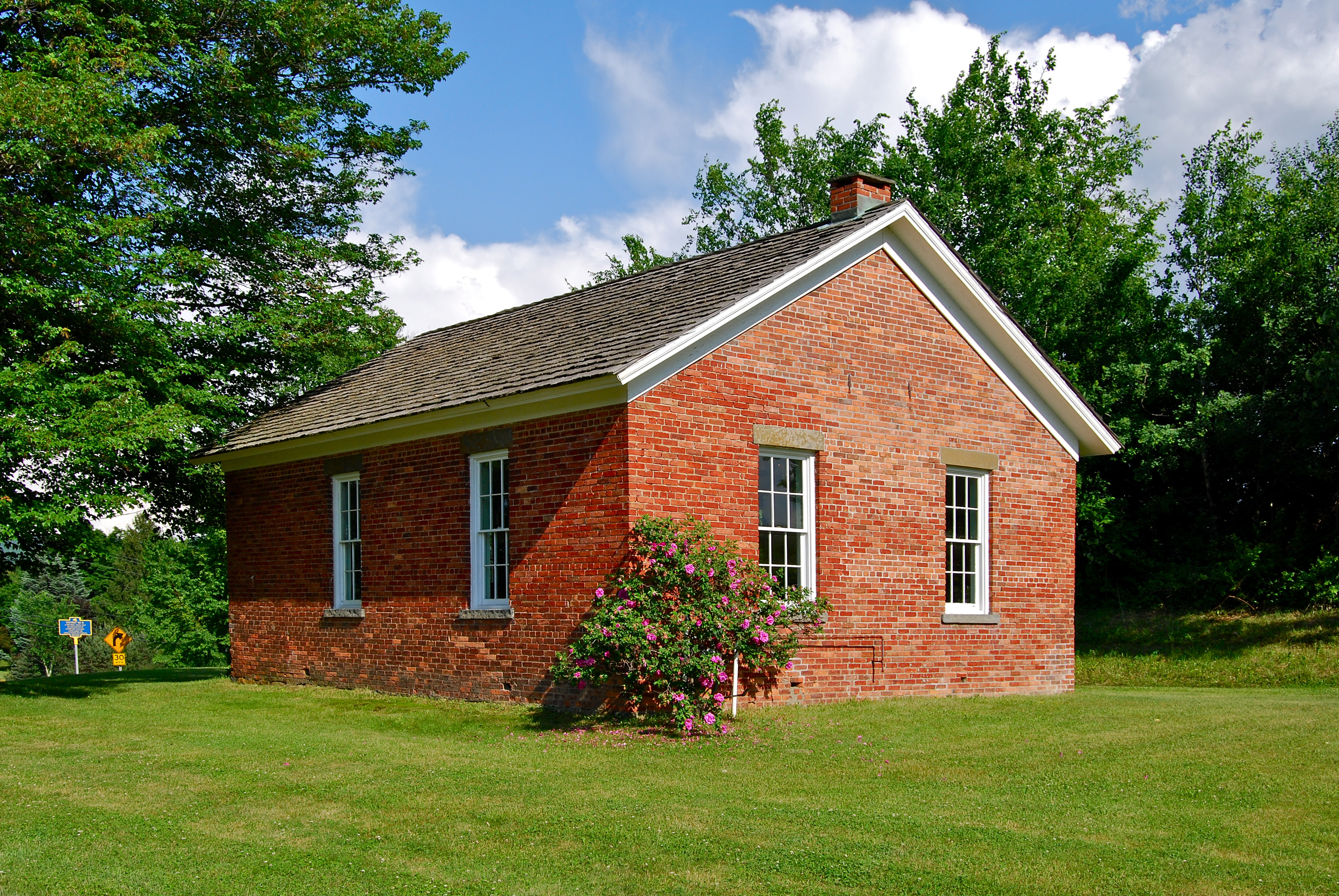
Little Red Schoolhouse

District #6, most commonly known as the Little Red Schoolhouse, but also sometimes known as the Lincoln School, Brick School, or Rocky Road School, is located at the corner of Buck Road and New York State Route 278 (Brick Church Road). Built around 1830, the building is the oldest standing schoolhouse in Brunswick and is still owned by BCSD. It underwent renovations in the 1970s and received additional refurbishments in the latter half of the 2000s (decade). It was added to National Register of Historic Places in 2008.

District #7, known as the VanArnum School, was located on Grange Road north of Calhoun Drive. The school was closed and sold at public auction in 1953. District #7 was centralized into Lansingburgh Central School District.

District #8, located on Hoosick Road across from Mickle Hill Road, was known as the Haynerville School, most likely named for the hamlet. District #9, known as the Moody School, was located on Dater Hill Road. District #10, located on Brunswick Road, east of St. Mary's Cemetery entrance, was centralized into the Enlarged City School District of Troy. District #11, called the Sycaway School, was located on the corner of Hoosick Street and Lee Avenue. This district was consolidated into the Enlarged City School District of Troy and is the current site of School 18, one of that district's elementary schools. District #12 was known as the Tamarac School, which is the namesake of the current schools on the main campus. It was located on Camel Hill Road, off Tamarac Road. The school was built in 1864, but collapsed under the weight of snow during the winter of 1994–95.

=== Centralization ===
In January 1945, the Town of Brunswick Trustees created a committee charged with gathering facts about school district centralization and reporting back to the community. In late 1945, the committee proposed a plan to the New York State Education Department, which was approved. Unfortunately the plan was out of the scope of a reasonable budget. By late 1950, town residents began commenting on the inadequacies of the then current infrastructure, equipment, and services within their schools. In early 1952, the district superintendent created a committee made up of one member from each school district to reevaluate centralization. By July 1953, the committee was formed and a chairman elected. That August, committee members met with members of the Education Department to discuss school programs and expected expenditures. It is estimated that an average teacher's salary would be $3,750 in 1956. In March 1954, the Centralization Committee produced a pamphlet entitled Digest of Facts to inform the community of the project. In April 1954, a citizens' advisory committee was created, made up of 48 individuals, representing all districts involved in centralization. By August, the committee produced A Partnership in Education pamphlet to be distributed in the area. On October 8, 1956, the citizens' committee voted to centralize and the first board of education was elected.

=== "Brittonkill" ===
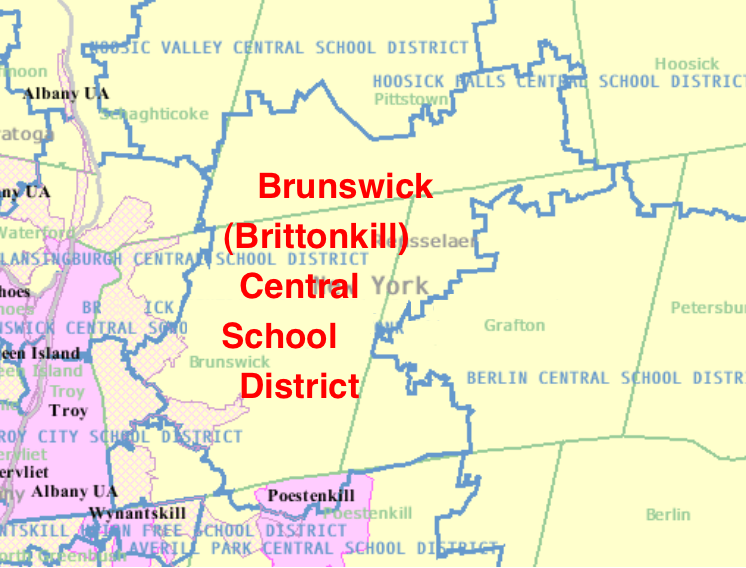
Map of BCSD

While the official name of the district is that of the encompassing town, the name Brittonkill has been in use since 1956. The name is a combination of the names of the four main towns served by the district: Brunswick, Pittstown, Grafton, and Poestenkill. The district held a competition in late 1955 to replace its name "Central School District No. 2 of the Towns of Brunswick, Grafton, Pittstown and Poestenkill". First prize was Brittonkill, submitted by Charles Meeson (also the district treasurer at the time); second prize was "Pittwick", a combination of Brunswick and Pittstown, submitted by Sally Parker; and third prize was "Rock Hollow", the name of a hamlet just east of Cropseyville, submitted (coincidentally) by both Cynthia Pope and Susan Kehn. The board of education did not adopt "Brittonkill" on the first attempt, voting four to four on January 12, 1956, and the naming issue was tabled indefinitely on February 9, 1956.

Brittonkill is just a nickname, Brunswick Central School District is their legal name. Website is http://www.brunswickcsd.org. In addition, the Brittonkill Teachers' Association, Brittonkill PTSA, Brittonkill Educational Enrichment Program, and Brittonkill Education Foundation all make use of the name.

Media and official references to the district typically use the name Brunswick (as with budget votes and school closings) and sometimes "Brunswick (Brittonkill)", although many times the district is referred to (incorrectly) as Brittonkill Central School District. Sports reports will usually reference the Tamarac Bengals. On rare occasions, the school buildings may incorrectly be referred to as Brittonkill High/Middle/Elementary School.

=== Geography ===
The district is bordered by Hoosic Valley Central School District and Hoosick Falls Central School District to the north; Berlin Central School District to the east; Averill Park Central School District to the south; and Enlarged City School District of Troy and Lansingburgh Central School District to the west.

== Administration ==
=== Board of education ===
The Board of Education (BOE) is the authoritative legislative body of the school district. It approves policy and funding; sets committees and district priorities; and approves employment (including the superintendent) within the district, among other things. The president of the BOE is the de facto chief financial officer of the district and the spokesperson of the board. According to official policy:

The Board of Education is a legislative body responsible for the governance of the Brunswick School District in a manner consistent with the laws, rules and regulations of the State of New York and the United States of America... and as a body, is the unit of authority for the School District

Members are elected by district residents that are registered to vote. The election takes place on the third Tuesday in May annually. This is the same day as the budget vote. Each year, three board seats are up for election. Board members are not paid for their services to the district.

The BOE is made up of nine members, each serving a three-year term; there are no term limits. The current members are Matt Wade (President), Mike Fortun (Vice President), Robert Fitzgerald, Anthony Grab, Jacklyn Lindemann, Margaret McCarthy, Jack Roddey, Leah Wertz, and Judy Wienman.

Members of the board of education (1955–2009)
1955	1956	1957	1958	1959
Gladys Abuhl; Richard Keeler; Richard McFalls; Charles Moore; Jay Parker; Edward Pickens; Howard Tate; Donald Waterfield; Lauriston Winsor	Gladys Abuhl; Richard Keeler; Richard McFalls; Charles Moore; Jay Parker; Edward Pickens; Howard Tate; Donald Waterfield; Lauriston Winsor	Wentworth Brown; Richard Keeler; George Lovegrove; Richard McFalls; Charles Moore; Jay Parker; Edward Pickens; Donald Waterfield; Lauriston Winsor	Wentworth Brown; Richard Keeler; Pauline Levigne; George Lovegrove; Richard McFalls; Jay Parker; Edward Pickens; Donald Waterfield; Lauriston Winsor	Wentworth Brown; Richard Keeler; Pauline Levigne; George Lovegrove; Richard McFalls; Edward Pickens; Frank Sheffer; Donald Waterfield; Lauriston Winsor
1960	1961	1962	1963	1964
Joseph Bursik; Charles Hill; Richard Keeler; Pauline Levigne; William Lewis; Frank Sheffer; Donald Waterfield; Kenneth White; Lauriston Winsor	Joseph Bursik; Charles Hill; David Howells; Pauline Levigne; William Lewis; Herbert Olsen; Frank Sheffer; Donald Waterfield; Kenneth White	Joseph Bursik; David Howells; William Lewis; Alex Murphy; Herbert Olsen; T. Peter Plumb; Frank Sheffer; Donald Waterfield; Kenneth White	Joseph Bursik; Bernard Fleishman; David Howells; Alex Murphy; Herbert Olsen; T. Peter Plumb; Frank Sheffer; Donald Waterfield; Kenneth White	Joseph Bursik; Bernard Fleishman; Ed Heidelmark; John Lloyd; Alex Murphy; Herbert Olsen; T. Peter Plumb; Frank Sheffer; Kenneth White
1965	1966	1967	1968	1969
Joseph Bursik; Bernard Fleishman; Edward Grady; Albert Hems; John Lloyd; Alex Murphy; Herbert Olsen; T. Peter Plumb; Frank Sheffer	Joseph Bursik; R. Eckel; Bernard Fleishman; Edward Grady; Albert Hems; John Lloyd; Alex Murphy; Herbert Olsen; T. Peter Plumb	Joseph Bursik; William Dessingue; R. Eckel; Bernard Fleishman; Edward Grady; John Lloyd; Alex Murphy; Herbert Olsen; T. Peter Plumb	E. Grady Bonesteel; Joseph Bursik; William Dessingue; R. Eckel; Bernard Fleishman; John Lloyd; Alex Murphy; Herbert Olsen; T. Peter Plumb	Joseph Bursik; William Dessingue; E.J. Duffey; Bernard Fleishman; Edward Grady; John Lloyd; Alex Murphy; Herbert Olsen; T. Peter Plumb
1970	1971	1972	1973	1974
Joseph Bursik; William Dessingue; E.J. Duffey; Bernard Fleishman; Edward Grady; Alex Murphy; Herbert Olsen; J. Pattison; T. Peter Plumb	Joseph Bursik; William Dessingue; E.J. Duffey; Bernard Fleishman; M. Lockwood; Alex Murphy; Herbert Olsen; J. Pattison; T. Peter Plumb	Joseph Bursik; William Dessingue; Neil Hook; B. Hummel; M. Lockwood; Alex Murphy; Herbert Olsen; J. Pattison; T. Peter Plumb; D. Roeck	Joseph Bursik; Neil Hook; B. Hummel; E. Leith; M. Lockwood; Alex Murphy; Herbert Olsen; D. Roeck; C. Southard	Joseph Bursik; Robert Cipperly; Neil Hook; B. Hummel; E. Leith; M. Lockwood; Herbert Olsen; D. Roeck; C. Southard
1975	1976	1977	1978	1979
Chris Bulson; Joseph Bursik; Robert Cipperly; Neil Hook; B. Hummel; E. Leith; M. Lockwood; Herbert Olsen; C. Southard	Clifford Brown; Chris Bulson; Joseph Bursik; Robert Cipperly; Charles DeSeve; N. Fletcher; Neil Hook; B. Hummel; E. Leith; C. Southard	Chris Bulson; Joseph Bursik; Robert Cipperly; Charles DeSeve; Neil Hook; B. Hummel; Janice Moody; C. Southard; Richard Welkley	Chris Bulson; Robert Cipperly; Charles DeSeve; Neil Hook; B. Hummel; Janice Moody; Benedict Schaefer; Richard Welkley; Donald Willets	Clifford Brown; Chris Bulson; Robert Cipperly; Kathleen McGrath; Janice Moody; Mr. Southworth; Raymond Trzcinski; John Wagner; Donald Willets
1980	1981	1982	1983	1984
rancis Balistreri; Chris Bulson; Robert Ducatte; Robert Gibson; Kathleen McGrath; Benedict Schaefer; Raymond Trzcinski; John Wagner; Donald Willets	Francis Balistreri; Christine Claus; Robert Ducatte; Robert Gibson; Kathleen McGrath; Benedict Schaefer; Helen Thompson; Raymond Trzcinski; John Wagner	Francis Balistreri; Christine Claus; Robert Ducatte; Robert Gibson; Ronald LeVan; Benedict Schaefer; Helen Thompson; Raymond Trzcinski; Irene Wynnyczuk	Francis Balistreri; Christine Claus; Robert Gibson; Kathleen McGrath; Kenneth Ross; Benedict Schaefer; Helen Thompson; Raymond Trzcinski; Irene Wynnyczuk	Christine Claus; Robert Gibson; Kathleen McGrath; Lou Morizio; Kenneth Ross; Benedict Schaefer; Helen Thompson; Sandra Whaley; Irene Wynnyczuk
1985	1986	1987	1988	1989
Christine Claus; David Gardam; Robert Gibson; Kathleen McGrath; Kenneth Ross; Benedict Schaefer; Helen Thompson; Sandra Whaley; Irene Wynnyczuk	Christine Claus; David Gardam; Robert Gibson; Kathleen McGrath; Kenneth Ross; Benedict Schaefer; Helen Thompson; Sandra Whaley; Irene Wynnyczuk	David Gardam; Robert Gibson; Andrew Grimm; Kathleen McGrath; Thomas Ring; Benedict Schaefer; Sherrie Shackett; Sandra Whaley; Irene Wynnyczuk	David Gardam; Robert Gibson; Andrew Grimm; Gary Johnston; Kathleen McGrath; Thomas Ring; Benedict Schaefer; Sherrie Shackett; Edward Staats	Scott Alderman; Roger Boothroyd; Pamela Broughel; David Gardam; Andrew Grimm; Gary Johnston; Barbara Rifenburg; Sherrie Shackett; Edward Staats
1990	1991	1992	1993	1994
Jeffrey Adams; Frank Bender; Roger Boothroyd; Christine Claus; David Gardam; Kathleen McGrath; David Nealon; Elizabeth Niemi; Edward Staats	Jeffrey Adams; Frank Bender; Roger Boothroyd; Christine Claus; Debora DuJack; David Gardam; Kathleen McGrath; David Nealon; Elizabeth Niemi	Frank Bender; Patricia Blackman; Roger Boothroyd; Christine Claus; Debora DuJack; David Gardam; David Little; Kathleen McGrath; Elizabeth Niemi	Frank Bender; Patricia Blackman; Roger Boothroyd; Debora DuJack; David Gardam; David Little; Kathleen McGrath; Peter Murdoch; Elizabeth Niemi	Frank Bender; Patricia Blackman; Karen Boswell; Debora DuJack; Frank Estabrooks; David Little; Kathleen McGrath; Peter Murdoch; Elizabeth Niemi
1995	1996	1997	1998	1999
Patricia Blackman; Karen Boswell; Debora DuJack; Frank Estabrooks; David Little; Kathleen McGrath; Peter Murdoch; Elizabeth Niemi; Penny Valenti	Patricia Blackman; Karen Boswell; Debora DuJack; Frank Estabrooks; David Little; Kathleen McGrath; Peter Murdoch; Penny Valenti; Christine Ward	Patricia Blackman; Karen Boswell; Debora DuJack; David Little; Kathleen McGrath; Jamie Meehan; Peter Murdoch; Penny Valenti; Christine Ward	Anthony Abate; Karen Boswell; Debora DuJack; David Little; Kathleen McGrath; Jamie Meehan; Peter Murdoch; Penny Valenti; Christine Ward	Anthony Abate; Karen Boswell; Debora DuJack; David Little; Kathleen McGrath; Jamie Meehan; Peter Murdoch; Penny Valenti; Christine Ward
2000	2001	2002	2003	2004
Anthony Abate; Karen Boswell; Paul Daley; Debora DuJack; Karen Jandali; Kathleen McGrath; Peter Murdoch; Penny Valenti; Christine Ward	Anthony Abate; Karen Boswell; Paul Daley; Debora DuJack; Karen Jandali; Kathleen McGrath; Peter Murdoch; Penny Valenti; Christine Ward	Anthony Abate; Karen Boswell; Paul Daley; Debora DuJack; Karen Jandali; Kathleen McGrath; Peter Murdoch; Robert Schmidt; Karen Zagursky	Anthony Abate; Karen Boswell; Paul Daley; Debora DuJack; Karen Jandali; Kathleen McGrath; Peter Murdoch; Robert Schmidt; Karen Zagursky	Anthony Abate; Paul Daley; Debora DuJack; Karen Jandali; Robert McCaffrey; Kathleen McGrath; Jamie Meehan; Peter Murdoch; Robert Schmidt
2005	2006	2007	2008	2009
Anthony Abate; Paul Daley; Debora DuJack; Karen Jandali; Robert McCaffrey; Kathleen McGrath; Jamie Meehan; Peter Murdoch; Robert Schmidt	Anthony Abate; Paul Daley; Debora DuJack; Karen Jandali; Nancy LaRocque; Robert McCaffrey; Kathleen McGrath; Jamie Meehan; Peter Murdoch	Anthony Abate; Paul Daley; Vito Grasso; Karen Jandali; Nancy LaRocque; Kathleen McGrath; Jamie Meehan; Peter Meskoskey; Karen Zagursky	Paul Daley; Mary Ann Doyle; Darren Galipeau; Vito Grasso; Nancy LaRocque; Kathleen McGrath; Jamie Meehan; Peter Meskoskey; Karen Zagursky	Paul Daley; Mary Ann Doyle; Darren Galipeau; Nancy LaRocque; Kathleen McGrath; Jamie Meehan; Peter Meskoskey; Matt Wade; Karen Zagursky

=== Superintendent of schools ===
The superintendent of schools is Dr. Angelina Maloney, who began her tenure on July 1, 2013. The superintendent is the chief executive and administrative officer of the district, is the official district spokesperson, and has ex officio membership to all district committees. The superintendent is responsible for the day-to-day operations of the district in addition to administering policies of the board.

Below is an incomplete list of past superintendents (incomplete in that it only spans back to 1984):

- Lou McIntosh:2010-2013
- John Yagielski: 2007 until 2008 (Interim)
- David T. Burnham: 2006 until 2007
- Teresa Thayer Snyder, PhD: 2003 until 2006
- Patrick DiCaprio: 2002 until 2003 (Interim)
- John R. Gratto, PhD: 1998 until 2002
- William H. Heath, III, PhD: 1998 (Interim)
- Barbara Nagler, PhD: 1990 until 1998
- Jerome Ochs: 1984 until 1990

Robert H Ludlum 1955 until 1960

== Schools ==
Tamarac Secondary School (then Tamarac High School) opened in 1958 and the first class graduated in 1960. The building serves grades 6 through 12, has a total staffing of 81.3 (on FTE basis), 685 students, and has kept average class sizes below 25 pupils from 2004 to 2007. There is one building principal and one building assistant principal.

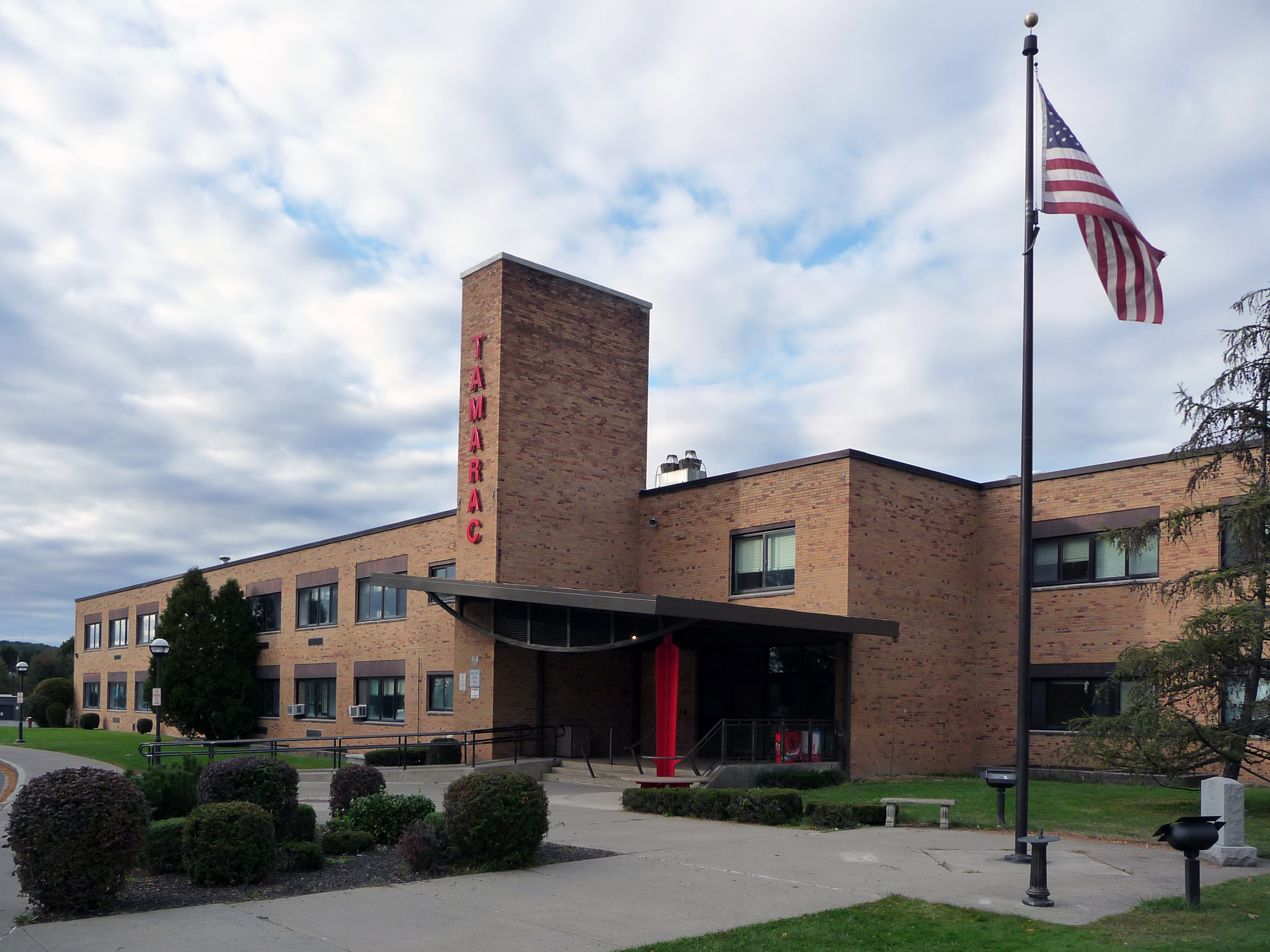
Tamarac Secondary School

The district auditorium is located within the Secondary School. This is where graduations, school plays, and concerts take place. The auditorium lobby is also a polling place during general elections and budget votes.

The Secondary School hosts a state of the art video production studio, allowing students to take part in all aspects of the media production process. Morning announcements are produced live in the studio, hosted by two students.

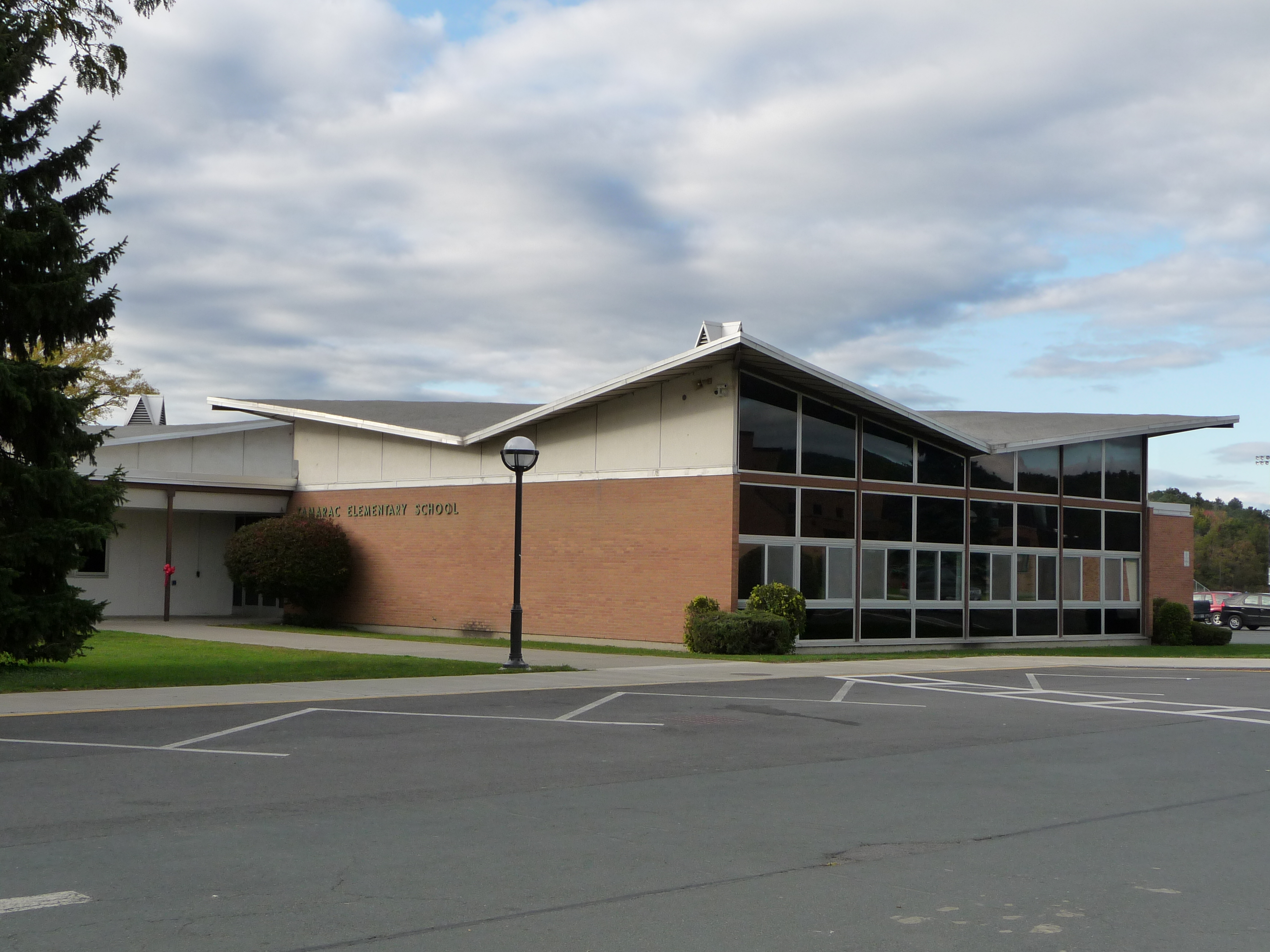
Tamarac Elementary School

The red "TAMARAC" letters found on the front façade of the building (see image at left) were the class gift of the Class of 2003

Tamarac Elementary School opened in 1965. It currently serves grades Pre-K through 5. The building has a total staffing of 55.92 (on FTE basis), 668 students, and has kept average class sizes at or below 22 pupils from 2004 to 2007. There is one building principal.

While the latest school report card and NCES records do not mention a Pre-K program, one has been initiated during the 2008–2009 school year on a limited basis.

== Student body ==
=== Ethnicity ===
Students during the 2023–2024 school year:

- Total Student Body: 1047 (100%)
- White: 927 (89%)
- African American: 12 (1%)
- Asian: 11 (1%)
- Latino: 51 (5%)
- American Indian or Native Alaskan: 1 (0%)
- Multiracial: 45 (4%)

=== Grade level ===
Students during the 2006–2007 school year:

- Elementary (K–5): 556 (41.4%)
- Middle School (6–8): 326 (24.3%)
- High School (9–12): 461 (34.3%)
- Class of 2007: 103

=== Testing scores ===
Data of passing rates (≥ 65%) for students taking Regents exams in the 2006–2007 school year:

- Comprehensive English: 82%
- Math A: 96%
- Math B: 93%
- Global History and Geography: 68%
- US History and Government: 87%
- Living Environment: 91%
- Earth Science: 82%
- Chemistry: 75%
- Physics: 76%
- Comprehensive French: 100%
- Comprehensive Russian: Not listed by NYS
- Comprehensive Spanish: 98%

=== Other statistics ===
According to reports, more than 90% of the class of 2007 intended on attending either a two-year or four-year college after graduating high school, almost half of which planned on attending a four-year institution. The following is additional data for the 2006–2007 school year:

- Attendance rate: 96%
- Dropout rate: 1%
- Annual spending per student: $12,971

== Curriculum ==
The district follows the general curriculum set forth by the Board of Regents of the University of the State of New York, under the direction of the Commissioner of Education and the New York State Education Department. To graduate, a student must have at least four credits each of English and social studies; three credits each of math and science; two credits each of gym class and foreign language classes; one credit of fine art; and one-half credit of health class. The student must also have at least 22 credits overall and pass a prescribed amount of state tests to receive a Regents diploma. For all subjects except gym and health, a full-year course is equal to one credit. Each year of gym class is equal to one-half credit and one-half year of health class is equal to the required amount of health credit.

In addition, the secondary school offers many electives such as digital photography, media production, studio in art, drawing, painting, band, chorus, choralaires, interior design, public speaking, in addition to many others. The secondary school offers four AP classes: AP US History, AP Environmental Science, AP English Language and Composition, and AP English Literature and Composition. The district's foreign language options include Spanish and Russian. Most of this information can be found in the High School Curriculum Guide, which is published by the high school Counseling Center.

Students have the opportunity to take part in a number of New Visions programs offered by Questar III and Capital Region BOCES. New Visions programs are higher-level and hands-on learning programs offered to students that apply to take it their senior years and take place at different locations around the capital district. Choices include the New Visions: Medical program, the New Visions: STEM program, the New Visions: Scientific Research & World Health program, the New Visions: Visual & Performing Arts program, the New Visions: Emergency Preparedness, Homeland Security, Cyber Security & Informatics program, and the New Visions: Pathways in Education program.

Dependent upon funding, students also have the opportunity to attend the new four-year Tech Valley High School. Even if a student attends Tech Valley High School, the student still receives their diploma from their home school district.

== Athletics ==
Tamarac Bengals mascot

All of the athletic teams are known as the Tamarac Bengals. Football offers varsity, junior varsity (JV), and modified teams. The varsity team is in Class C and in 2008 had its first winning season in over a decade. Soccer offers varsity, JV, and modified teams for both boys and girls. The boys' varsity team is in Class B of the Wasaren League and won the sectionals game against Cohoes in 2008, but lost the regionals game to Plattsburgh. Basketball offers varsity, JV, and modified for both boys and girls. For the school's fiftieth anniversary, the athletic department released a list of the top 50 boys' varsity players of all time. Cheerleading is offered both for football and basketball seasons. Baseball and girls' softball both offer varsity and JV teams. Wrestling offers varsity, JV, and modified teams. Volleyball is only offered to girls and has varsity, JV, and modified teams. Cross country offers varsity and modified teams and includes many athletes from the track and field team. Recently added was a golf team.

== Student organizations ==
The high school offers a significant number of extracurricular student organizations. One of the major events is the school musical, which is open to grades 7 through grades 12 every spring.

In addition, the school offers these student organizations:

- Book Club
- Chess Club
- Class Council, Freshman
- Class Council, Sophomore
- Class Council, Junior
- Class Council, Senior
- Clay Target Club
- Gaming Club
- Gay Straight Alliance (GSA)
- High School Band Club
- High School Music Club
- Jazz Ensemble
- Kids Care Community
- Key Club
- Masterminds Team
- National Honor Society (grade 12 only)
- National Junior Honor Society (both grades 8 and 9)
- Olympics of the Visual Arts Club
- Russian Club
- Ski Club
- Student Senate
- Students Against Destructive Decisions (SADD)
- Youth Activation Club
- Yearbook (Triumph)

== Infrastructure ==
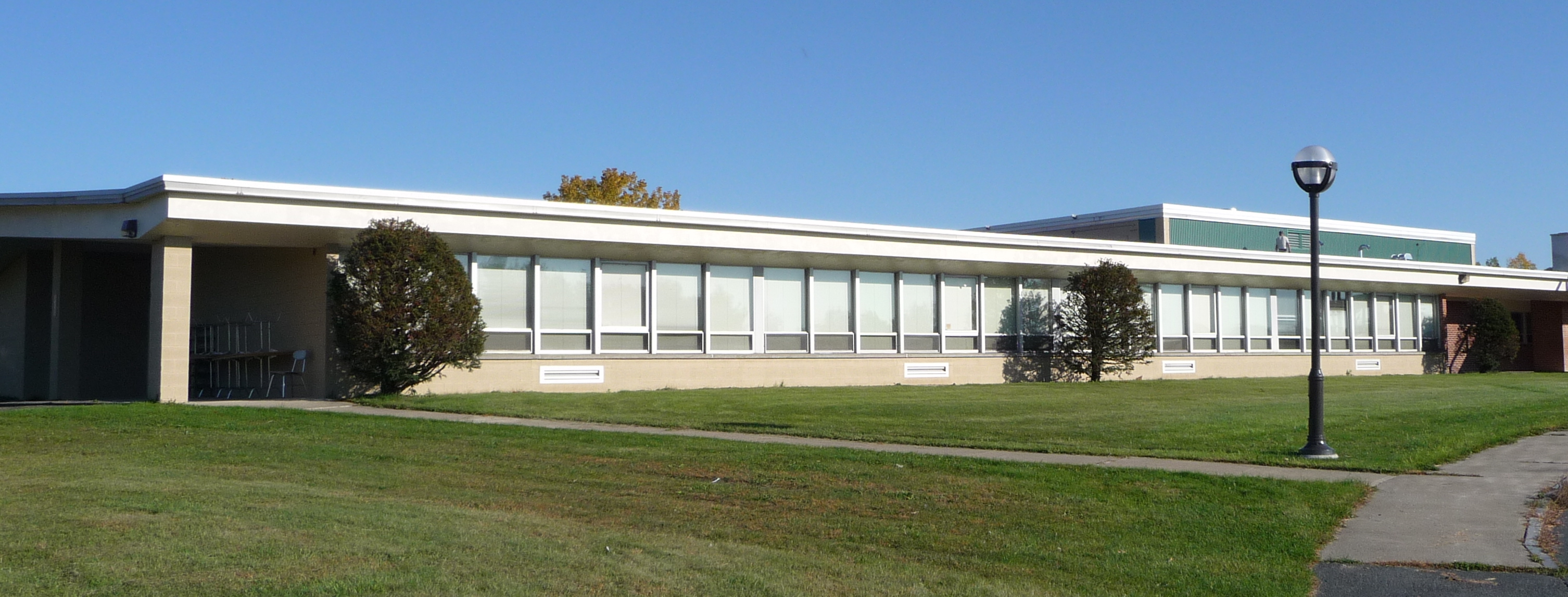
The former Parker School

Besides the two school buildings on the main campus, the district used to own another school building, Parker School, in Pittstown. The school district sold the school for $69,112 in 2015 to Paul Donnelly.

The campus has one main sports field, complete with bleachers, a reporters' box, concession stand, and newly installed storage building. The track that surrounds the main field underwent a significant upgrade in the late 1990s from a small dirt track to a professional running track. The field is used for both football and soccer. The area is also used for track and field events such as high jump, long jump, and pole vault. Elsewhere on campus there are three soccer fields, one baseball diamond, two softball diamonds, one outdoor basketball court, and two tennis courts.

The district owns and runs its own bussing service. The bus garage is located on Tamarac Road, about one half mile from the main campus.

The main campus is serviced by a trickling filter type wastewater treatment plant, which replaced a large septic tank and leach field in the early 2000s (decade).

== See also ==
=== Education-related ===
- New York State Education Department
- University of the State of New York
- Regents Examinations
- Board of Cooperative Educational Services (BOCES)
- List of school districts in New York
- New York State School Boards Association
- National School Boards Association
- No Child Left Behind Act

=== Geographical ===
- Brunswick, New York - Town the district resides in
- Grafton, New York - One town the district serves
- Pittstown, New York - One town the district serves
- Poestenkill, New York - One town the district serves
- Schaghticoke, New York - One town the district serves (albeit very little of the town resides in the district)
- Rensselaer County, New York - County the district resides in

=== Printed works ===
- Zankel, Sharon Martin. Images of America: Brunswick. 1st. Great Britain: Arcadia Publishing/Brunswick Historical Society, 1998. pp 69–80. ISBN 0-7524-1306-6.

=== Notable documents ===
- Superintendent's Contract from SeeThroughNY
- Teachers' Contract from SeeThroughNY
- The New York State School Report Card: District Summary Reports 2004-2005. New York State Education Department.
- New York State District Report Card: Accountability and Overview Report 2006-2007. The University of the State of New York.
- New York State District Report Card: Comprehensive Information Report 2006-2007. The University of the State of New York.
