= Garfield School (Brunswick, New York) =

- U.S. National Register of Historic Places
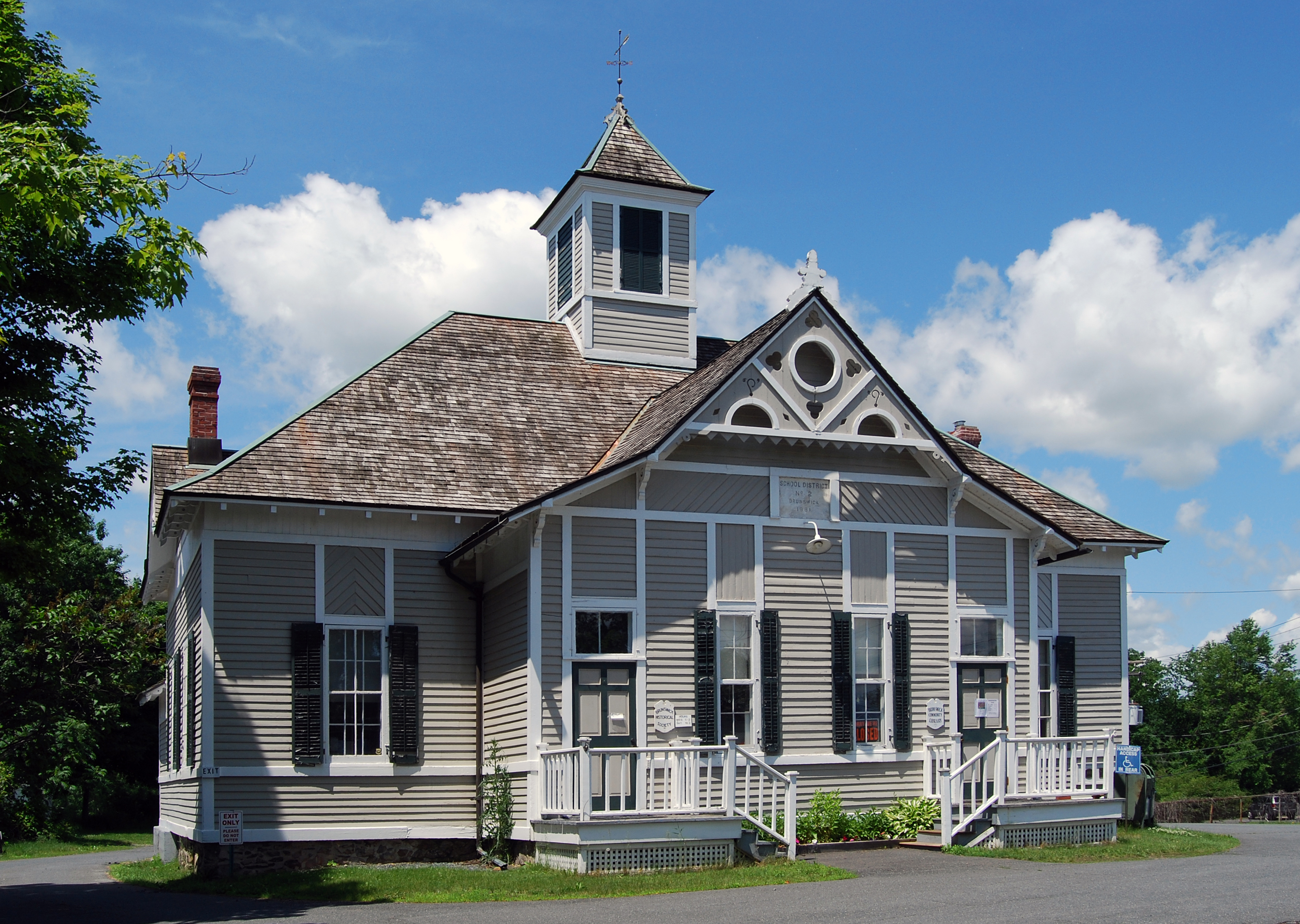
- View from the south, 2009

- Location within New York
- Location: Eagle Mills, Brunswick, New York
- Nearest city: Troy
- Coordinates: 42°43′49.43″N 73°35′51.82″W
- Area: 0.87 acres (0.35 ha)
- Built: 1881
- Built by: Joachim Filieau
- Architect: Nicholas Pawley
- NRHP reference No.: 88000717
- Added to NRHP: June 9, 1988

The District #2 Schoolhouse, known locally as the Garfield School and also known as Brunswick District No. 2 School, located in Brunswick, New York, United States, is a two-room schoolhouse built and opened in 1881. It hosted local students until the consolidation of Brunswick (Brittonkill) Central School District in the mid-1950s. It was added to the National Register of Historic Places (NRHP) in 1988, becoming the first building in the Town of Brunswick to be added to the Register. It is the current home of the Brunswick Historical Society.

The building, located on the corner of Moonlawn Road and New York Route 2 (Brunswick Road), was owned by Brunswick Central School District until it was transferred to the Town of Brunswick in 1986. It was named for President James A. Garfield, who taught penmanship at a nearby school in Poestenkill.

== History ==
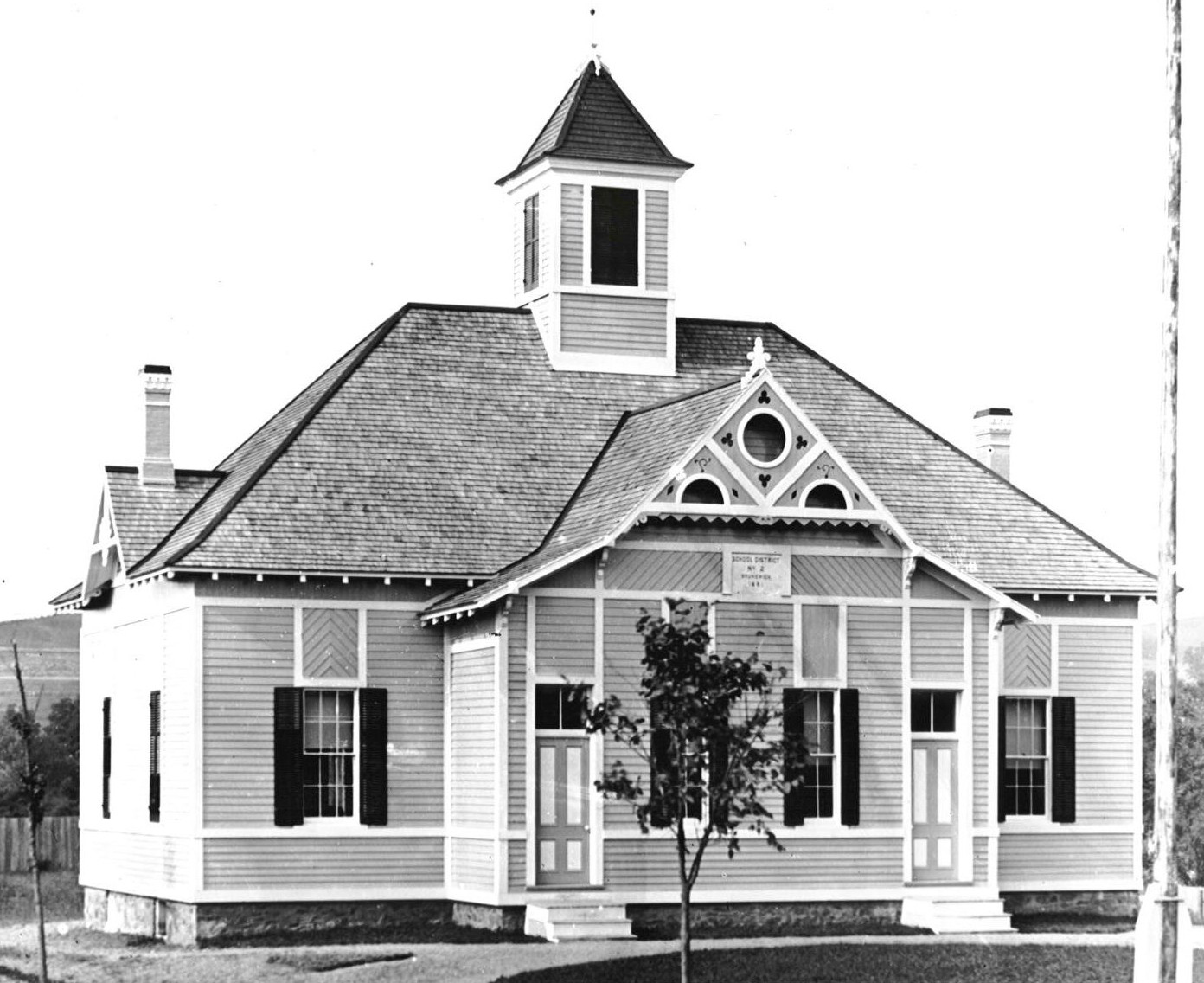
View of the school shortly after completion, c. 1881

The need for new school buildings in Brunswick became apparent when, in 1879, Edward Wait, the newly appointed district commissioner for that portion of Rensselaer County of which District #2 was part, lamented to the state superintendent of public education about the poor quality of many schools in his district, in addition to overcrowding in some. Within three years, ten new schoolhouses were built in his district, the Garfield School being one of them.

The planning of the school is well documented. Facing an enlarging student body (or possibly the prodding from the enthusiastic Commissioner Wait), the board of trustees voted on October 14, 1879, to have plans and specifications drawn up for a new schoolhouse. Reasons cited were for a growing student body and the current schoolhouse being in a "dilapidated condition". The board commissioned Nicholas Pawley, a carpenter from Poestenkill, to design the new building.

The fact that the design of the schoolhouse was commissioned is notable because most schoolhouses at the time were built based on templates found in architectural plan books. Most ended up as simple rectangular structures, made of wood or brick, with no distinguishing features. The Garfield School, on the other hand, was designed to be a beautiful addition to the town and become an icon of education.

The design was originally meant to be a two-room, two-story schoolhouse, but was eventually reconfigured to be a two-room, one-story building, with classrooms located side-by-side. The main building measures about 53.5 by 29 feet (16.3 by 8.8 m). Each of the two classrooms is rectangular; they were originally separated by a sliding wall, which could be moved in the event of a large crowd or gathering. A vestibule used as a cloakroom juts out from the front about 8 feet (2.4 m); each classroom had its own entrance, which can still be seen in the photo shown above.

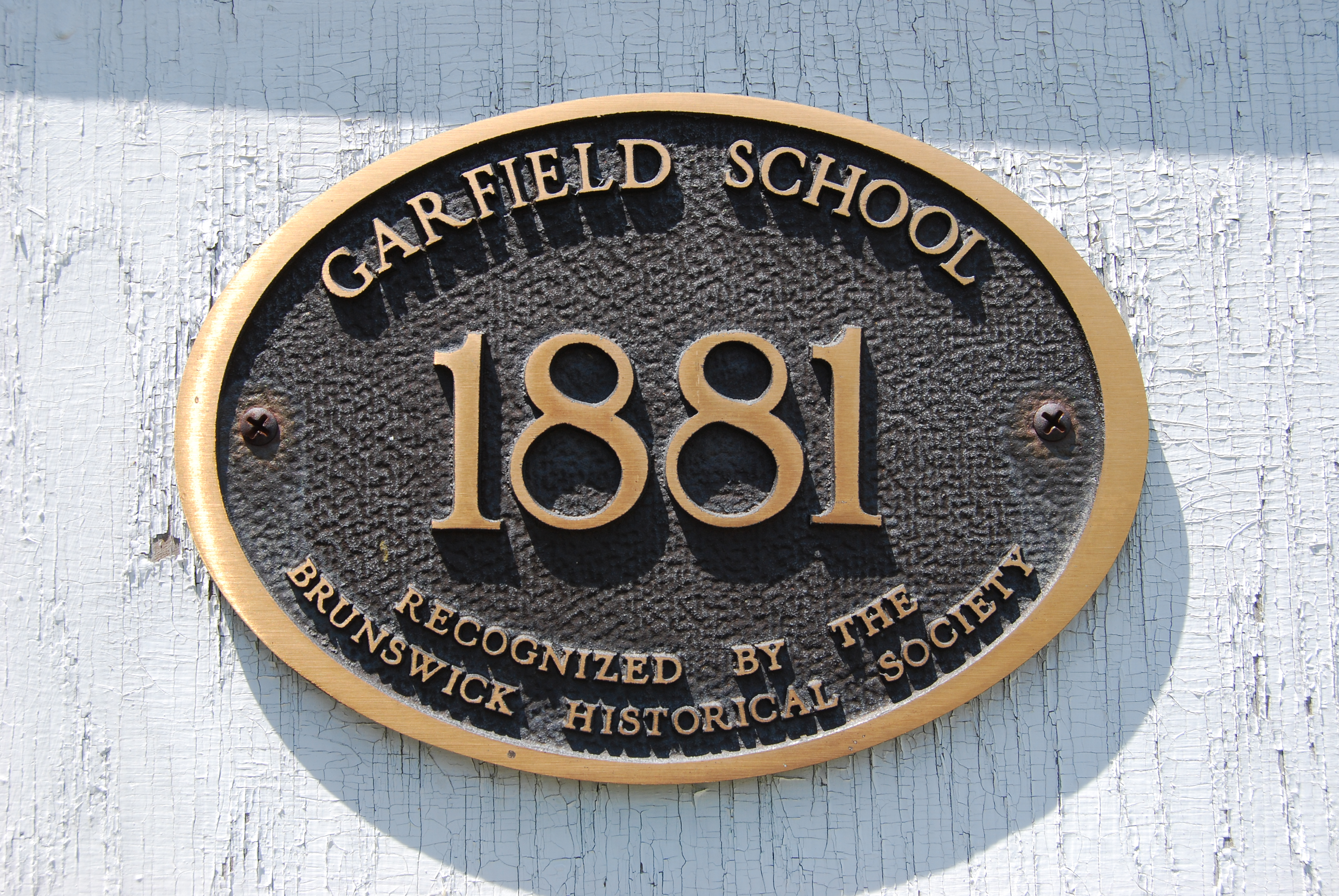
Plaque commemorating opening, from the Brunswick Historical Society

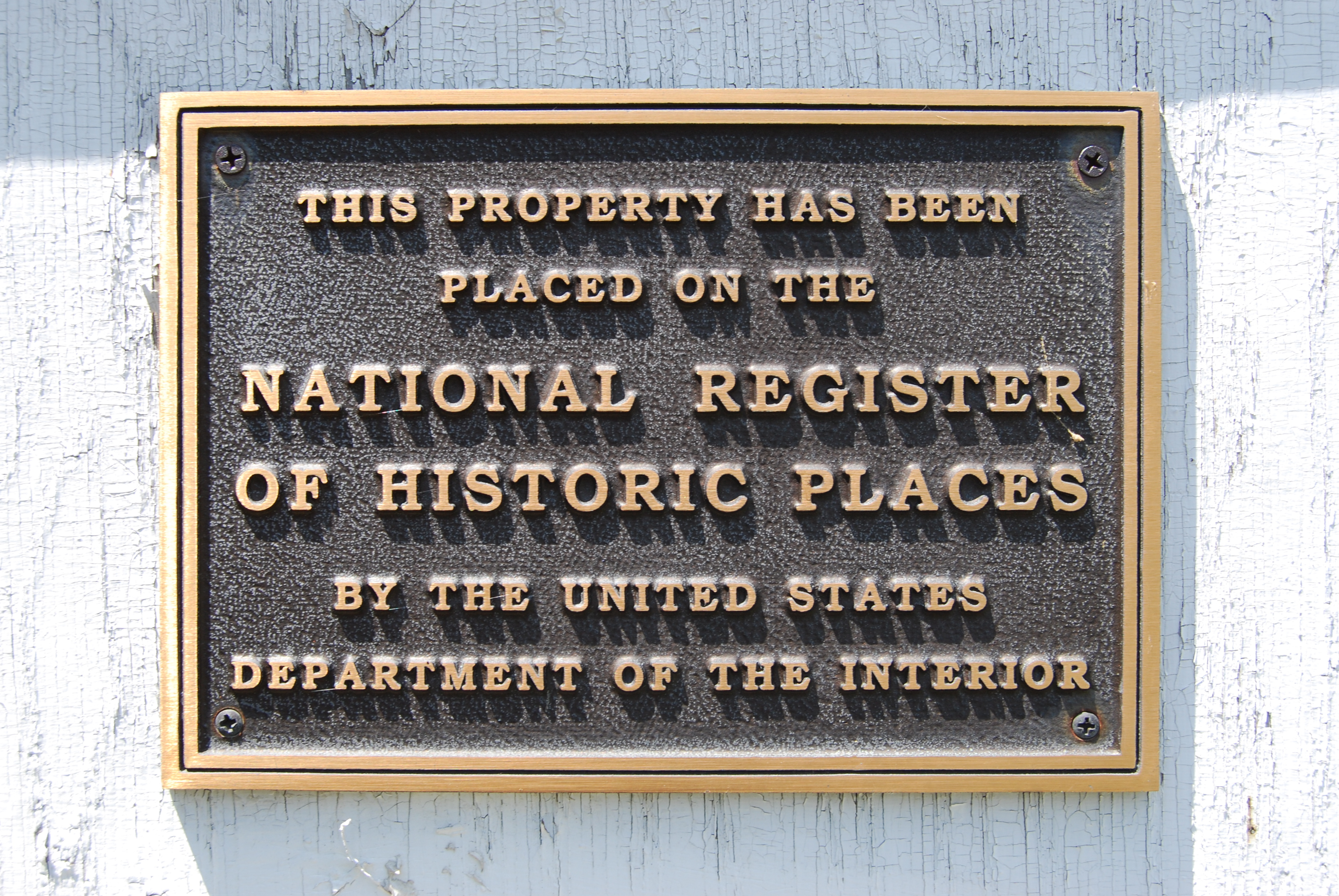
Plaque commemorating addition to the NRHP

The construction contract was awarded to Joachim Filieau, who was a member of the board of trustees at the time. The designer, Pawley, had also bid for the construction of the building, but did not win the contract, probably because he had not been the low bidder. Filieau was also a local carpenter and built the schoolhouse to the specifications set forth by Pawley. Construction began during the summer of 1881 and finished in time for the beginning of the school year. The building cost $2,762 and was funded by a combination of taxes and four $500 bonds.

The design of the structure is notable because it was built to serve a purpose but also be architecturally and aesthetically pleasing. For example, the structure has a gabled roof and ornamental woodwork at the peaks of each gable, still there today, and visible in the photo above. Additionally, to avoid the perception of a horizontal, or "squat", building, Pawley also called for a cupola, which still exists today with its original weathervane. Also uncommon for the time, the building has a full basement.

The school eventually became known as the Garfield School, in recognition of President James A. Garfield, who taught penmanship at a nearby school in Poestenkill while attending Williams College in Massachusetts.

Sometime around 1920, an 8-foot (2.4 m) addition was added to the back of the building to allow for internal plumbing, toilets, and sinks. This was added to conform with newly developed health standards, which required sanitary facilities in all public schools by September 1918. This was the only major addition to the structure over the course of its history.

Today the building is home to the Brunswick Historical Society. It was added to the NRHP in 1988, becoming the first listed building in the Town of Brunswick. Until 1986, it was owned by Brunswick Central School District, but was transferred to the Town of Brunswick that year, under the condition that the building only be used for educational purposes. The Brunswick Community Library opened in the building in 1986 and remained there until a new library building was opened further east on Brunswick Road in September 2009.

The Garfield School is considered the best-preserved two-room schoolhouse in Rensselaer County and has been used continuously since its opening. After school district consolidation in the 1950s, the building was still used by its home district at times of overcrowding and was used for BOCES classes for some time.
