= New York State Route 278 =

State highway in Rensselaer County, New York, US

New York State Route 278
- Map of Rensselaer County in eastern New York with NY 278 highlighted in red

Route information
- Maintained by NYSDOT
- Length: 1.51 mi (2.43 km)
- Existed: c. 1938–present

Major junctions
- South end: NY 2 in Brunswick
- North end: NY 7 in Brunswick

Location
- Country: United States
- State: New York
- Counties: Rensselaer

Highway system
- New York Highways; Interstate; US; State; Reference; Parkways
| ← I-278 | → NY 279 |

New York State Route 278 (NY 278) is a state highway in Rensselaer County, New York, in the United States. The route, 1.51 miles (2.43 km) in length, is located in a rural section of the town of Brunswick. It climbs uphill from a southern terminus at NY 2 in the hamlet of Clums Corners to its northern end at NY 7. The road was taken over by the state of New York in 1905 and designated NY 278 c. 1938.

== Route description ==
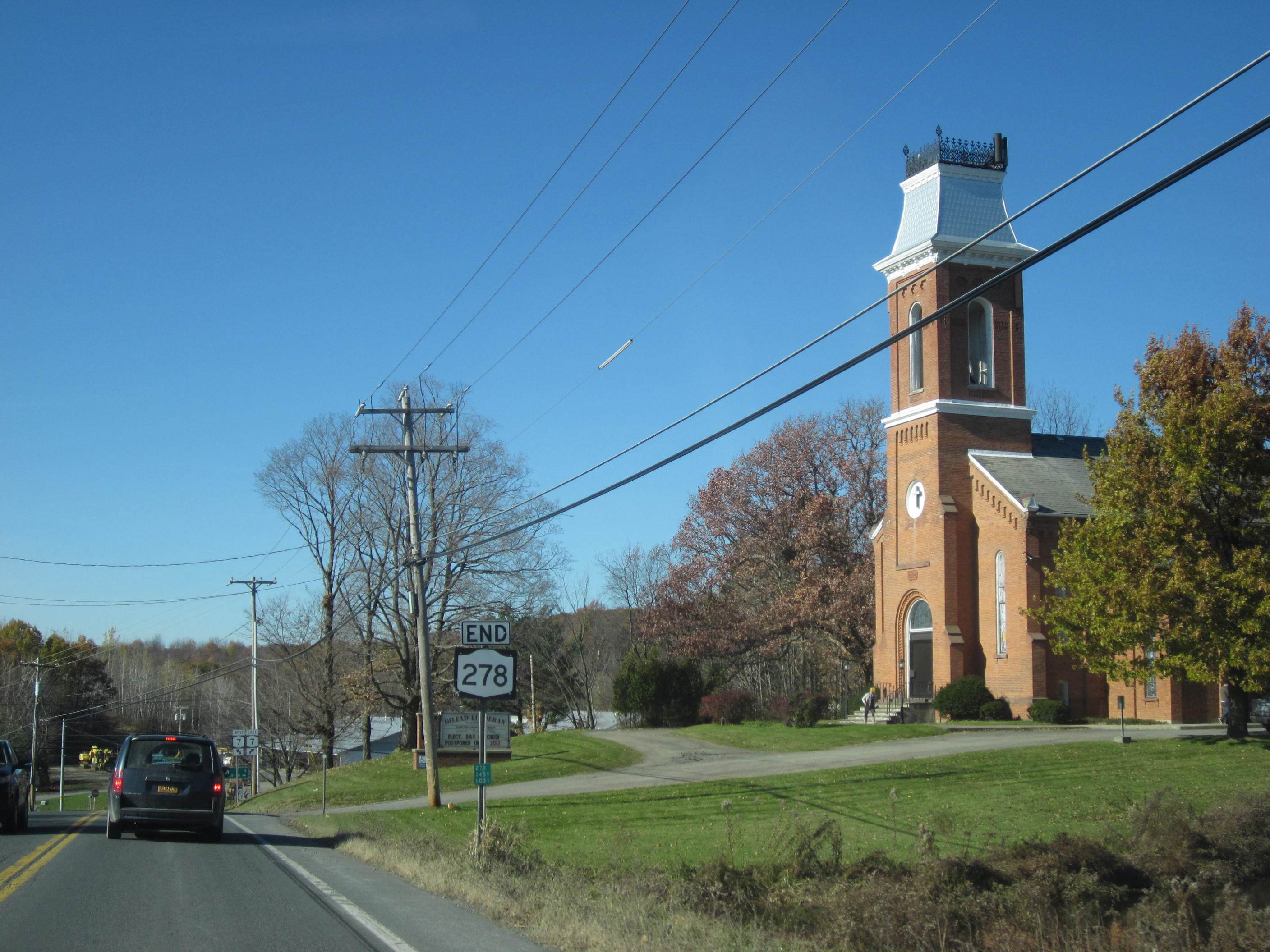
NY 278 approaching the junction with NY 7 in Brunswick Center

NY 278 begins at an intersection with NY 2 in the hamlet of Clums Corners, located within a valley in eastern Brunswick. The highway progresses northwestward, intersecting with County Route 129 (CR 129, Tamarac Road) before ascending in elevation and continuing out of Clums Corners as Brick Church Road. NY 278 passes some farms and buildings as it traverses several small hills and intersects with the northern terminus of CR 133 (Moonlawn Road). The route descends slightly from here, passing some more farms and the namesake brick church before terminating at an intersection with NY 7 (Hoosick Street) northeast of Brunswick Center.

== History ==
On June 13, 1904, the state of New York let a contract to improve what is now NY 278 and a roughly 2-mile (3.2 km) stretch of modern NY 2 to state highway standards. The project cost just over $33,440 (equivalent to $1,170,276 in 2024) and was completed by mid-1905. The 3.33 miles (5.36 km) of highway improved by the project were added to the state highway system on August 25, 1905, and internally designated as State Highway 197 (SH 197). The segment of SH 197 northwest of Clums Corner did not receive a posted designation until c. 1938, when it was designated as NY 278.

== Major intersections ==
The entire route is in Brunswick, Rensselaer County.

| mi | km | Destinations | Notes |
|---|---|---|---|
| 0.00 | 0.00 | NY 2 / CR 129 – Grafton Lakes State Park | Southern terminus; hamlet of Clums Corners |
| 1.51 | 2.43 | NY 7 – Troy, Bennington | Northern terminus |
1.000 mi = 1.609 km; 1.000 km = 0.621 mi
