= History of Swansea =

History of Swansea, Wales

The history of Swansea covers a period of continuous occupation stretching back a thousand years, while there is archaeological evidence of prehistoric human occupation of the surrounding area for thousands of years before that.

Swansea (Welsh: Abertawe) occupies a position at the mouth of the River Tawe adjacent to an extensive bay at the western end of the Bristol Channel. It was founded as a town in the early 12th century, centred around its Norman castle. Part of the Lordship of Gower, established after the Norman invasion of Wales, it suffered episodes of destructive attack by forces of the displaced Welsh princes before developing into a prosperous market town and as a port with trading links across the Bristol Channel, as well as to France and Ireland. By the 18th century it was well established as a civic and cultural entity and as a fashionable tourist resort.

With the expansion of the coal mining and copper smelting industries in the Swansea Valley in the 18th and early 19th century, Swansea became the centre of a new industrial and commercial area. The combination of a distinctively diverse, cosmopolitan, rapidly expanding population, a flourishing provincial science movement and a strong commercial and industrial base secured its pre-eminent and unique status in the urban history of early 19th century Wales.

Industry grew throughout the 19th century, changing the geography of the town as its surrounding areas became incorporated into its municipal boundaries. In 1889 Swansea attained county borough status. Throughout the 20th century industry declined but the town continued to grow in population. Swansea officially gained city status in 1969.

== Early history ==
The oldest known remains on the Gower Peninsula are the Red Lady of Paviland: human bones dating from 22,000 BC. Later inhabitants also left their mark on the land. Examples include the Bronze Age burial mound at Cillibion and the Iron Age hill fort, Cil Ifor. Isolated prehistoric artifacts have been found in the area the city proper occupies, but there are far more on Gower. The remains of a Roman villa were also excavated on Gower.

The Welsh name, Abertawe, translates to mouth of the Tawe. It first appears c.1150 as Aper Tyui.

== Medieval Swansea ==
By the late 10th century, the region, including the land around the bay and the Gower, was part of the Welsh kingdom of Deheubarth under Maredudd ap Owain. The Vikings arrived sometime between the 9th and 11th centuries, leaving behind their name for a settlement in the area. The precise nature and location of this settlement are still disputed. Spellings such as Swensi, Sweni and Svenshi are found on coins minted around 1140,

In the wake of the Norman Conquest and Norman invasion of Wales, Gower became a marcher lordship which included not only the peninsula itself but also the land to the east as far north as the River Amman and east to the River Tawe. This included the site of Swansea town, which was designated the capital of the area. Although Kilvey Hill is to the east of the Tawe, the manor of Kilvey was also associated with Gower. The new Norman lords encouraged English immigration into the area. This immigration was largely from the West Country.

A turf and timber motte and bailey castle was erected in Swansea in 1106 and was assailed by the local Welsh ten years later (and several more times in the following century). The original castle was subsequently rebuilt in stone. The Braose family—memorialised in local placenames and road names today as de Breos—possessed Gower in the 13th century and lived at Oystermouth Castle.

== Religion ==
The church of St John the Baptist, founded by the Knights Hospitallers in the 12th century, was built on a site located on what is now Swansea High Street. Also established at the same time was an adjoining "hospice house" for the provision of physical care in the locality. In the 19th century the church was rebuilt, rededicated to, and renamed as St Matthew's.

The medieval St. Mary's Church, founded in the 14th century, became the centre of religious life in Swansea until the reformation and the subsequent proliferation of protestant denominations. By the mid-19th century nonconformist religious practice became the predominant form of worship, consolidated by an intensive period of chapel building and renovation. A religious census of 1851 recorded 44 places of Nonconformist worship compared to 8 Anglican in the Swansea locality.

The small Roman Catholic population in Swansea expanded rapidly in the 19th century with the influx of Irish immigrant workers. In 1888 what is now St Joseph’s Cathedral was constructed in the Greenhill district of Swansea.

Swansea had one of the oldest organised Jewish congregations in the UK and the first in Wales. A Jewish burial ground was established in the Mayhill district in 1768. As the Jewish population grew and prospered funds were raised for the construction of a synagogue on the historic Goat Street (on a site now part of Princess Way in the city centre). Opened in 1859, it was destroyed during the Swansea Blitz in the Second World War. A new synagogue in the Uplands district was established in 1955.

== The port and industrialisation ==
The South Wales Coalfield reaches the coast in this region, and coal was being exported by the year 1550, along with great quantities of limestone, quarried in the Mumbles area and on Gower and in high demand as fertiliser. Swansea was already a significant port with trading links across the Bristol and English Channels and the Irish Sea. There was a constant influx of migrants from the Welsh countryside, which occasioned the protest of 1603.

The population at this time was concentrated around the castle and river. Despite small-scale coal mining, the bulk of the area beyond the town was still largely farmland. Swansea Bay was considered an attractive region. In the 18th century, some local notables wanted to direct future development into promoting it as a resort. Their plans were frustrated by the rapid development of industry in the area.

By weight, more coal than copper ore is needed for the process of smelting copper from the ore, so it is more economical to build the smelter near the coal source. Swansea had very local mines, a navigable river, a nearby supply of limestone (necessary as flux), and trading links across the Bristol Channel to Cornwall and Devon, sources of copper ore.

As the Industrial Revolution took off, a series of works were built along the Tawe river from 1720 onwards and a series of mines were opened. Initially, the smelting works concentrated on copper. Coal was brought down to them by waggonways and tramways; copper ore was brought on ships which could sail right up to the works; the resulting copper was exported out again. Swansea had become "Copperopolis", processing at its peak as much as 70% of the world's copper, and the lower Tawe valley became a mass of industry.

More and more riverside wharfs were built. Tramways, waggonways and railways proliferated and connected the different works and the collieries supplying them. Today's Hafod was originally the village of Vivianstown (Vivian & Sons owned the Hafod Copper Works); and Morriston was founded c. 1790 (the exact date is unclear) by the Morris family who owned the Cambrian Works among other properties. By 1750, the Swansea district was providing half the copper needs of Britain.

The Cambrian Works closed down as a smelter but reopened as the Cambrian Pottery in 1764: pottery-making is another industry which requires vast quantities of coal (available locally) and clay and flint (available from the West Country, readily accessible by water). The Glamorgan Pottery was founded in 1813 by the ex-manager of the Cambrian Pottery, right next door to it and in direct competition with it. Not only the managers of the potteries but many of the workers came originally from Staffordshire. From 1814 to about 1822 the Cambrian made fine porcelain with excellent overglaze enamel painting, mostly of flowers. Examples of Swansea pottery can be seen today at the Glynn Vivian Art Gallery and at Swansea Museum

One of the most well-known pieces of Swansea's history began life at this stage: the Mumbles Railway. This started in the first decade of the 19th century as an industrial tramway: a horse pulling a cart along tram plates. It had a specific branch line into Clyne valley where Sir John Morris, one of the railway's owners, owned coal mines. Despite some early journeys made by tourists, it was not until the 1860s that the railway began to carry passengers regularly, by which time it had acquired rails instead of tram plates.

As the town expanded, gates put up by the local turnpike trust were no longer on the outskirts of town but in the town itself. Originally travel between Swansea and other towns or villages had involved paying tolls. Now, travel around the town itself required toll money. This was naturally an unpopular development, and in 1843, Swansea inhabitants made their own contribution to the Rebecca Riots, burning the Ty Coch gate in St Thomas. In the same year, workers from all the copper works in Swansea went on strike after their wages were cut. They returned to work five weeks later, having failed to restore their wages. The strike must have been born of desperation. It was known that John Henry Vivian, one of the owners of the copperworks, was no supporter of workers' rights: he had blacklisted men involved in earlier disturbances.

Civil disturbances were a regular feature of the 1840s in Swansea. This was the period of the Rebecca Riots, of Chartism in the valleys to the east with the Merthyr Rising and the Newport Rising, and general discontent. Huge crowds would gather when those suspected of involvement in Rebecca activities were brought to the station house, and the riot was provoked when one suspect was arrested on the Sabbath (Molloy). At this time, Colonel James Frederick Love commanded militia who were billeted in Swansea, and (in 1843):

Colonel Love had serious problems in deciding how best to stretch his resources. And stretched they were, because it was equally clear that Swansea needed to be strongly garrisoned to cope with violent incursions by unemployed coal and iron workers and discontented country-people, as would Llanelli when the Gwendraeth Valley troubles reached their climax in the following two months. And all the time the Chartist threat hung over the industrial areas to the east.

In this early part of the 19th century, the area which is now Brynmill, Sketty, the Uplands and the university campus was where several of the owners of the "manufactories" lived, in large park-like estates well to the west of the Tawe. The workers were crammed along the banks of the Tawe and lived in poor conditions. The prevailing wind carried the smoke from the copper works to the east, towards St Thomas and Kilvey. A contemporary report written by a doctor describing Swansea Valley speaks of a nightmare landscape, "literally burnt" where few plants would grow, dotted with lifeless pools, slag heaps, mounds of scoriae and smoke from the works everywhere. George Borrow, later to write and publish his Wild Wales, visited the town in the same year, describing it slightly less emphatically as "a large, bustling, dirty, gloomy place".

Writing in 1860, John Murray reports:

To the traveller who crosses the Llandore bridge at night, the livid glare from the numerous chimneys, the rolling, fleecy, white clouds that fill up the valley beneath him, the desolate-looking heaps of slag on either side, might well recalls Dante's line - "voi che entrate lasciate ogni speranza" and records there are no trees, and instead of grass a yellow sickly growth of chamomile scarcely covers the ground.

The contrast between the living conditions of workers and their employers the mine-owners and ironmasters was stark, although entertainment interests sometimes overlapped: both workers and employers flocked to the Swansea horse races, for example, held at Crymlyn Burrows. In addition to the racing, this was also the scene of boxing, gambling, cock-fighting, shows and drinking.

The importance of Swansea as a centre of a new industrial and commercial area at the forefront of the Industrial Revolution was recognised by the Bank of England which established its first Welsh branch in the town in 1826. Swansea also became prominent as a focus for scientific, literary and cultural life in South Wales. In 1835 a Scientific Society was formed and subsequently re-established as the Royal Institution of South Wales based in the first purpose-built museum in Wales which opened in 1841. With its reputation as "the intelligent town" thus enhanced, Swansea hosted the annual meetings of the British Association for the Advancement of Science in 1848 and 1880. Swansea was the home to the first weekly newspapers to be published in Wales: the English-language The Cambrian from 1804, and the Welsh-language Seren Gomer from 1814.

Swansea's population rose from under 2000 in 1750 to over 6000 in 1800, to 10,255 by 1821 and to over 18,000 by 1835 with in-immigration the predominant factor. With the expansion of its municipal boundaries, by 1888 its population had reached over 78,000 and by 1918, 160,810. Due to immigration by 1881 more than a third of the borough's population had been born outside Glamorgan, and just under a quarter outside Wales.

== Victorian slums and reform ==
In order to allow boats to dock without running aground at low tide and to remain afloat, the "Float" was constructed: the Tawe was diverted and a new dock with locks created. Work began in 1852, and the result was New Dock in 1859. Further changes to the docks were proposed, and the town authorities realised the potential grave effect on public health, particular in the riverside St Thomas area. Drinking water came from springs locally but clean water sources were increasingly rare. Cholera broke out in 1832; and again in 1849.

There was no sewerage system in Swansea until 1857 and the water supply in areas above the reservoir level was "in many cases of a questionable character" (contemporary report quoted by Dean). The Lliw reservoir of 1863 helped provide clean water, but drainage of dirty water was still a problem.

In 1865, Swansea suffered an epidemic of yellow fever, the only outbreak of that disease on the British mainland. A cargo of copper ore from Cuba was landed in exceptionally hot weather in September, and with it a number of infected mosquitoes. In a month, 27 inhabitants were infected and 15 died.

Swansea saw yet another outbreak of cholera in 1866 and the local authorities were eventually forced by legislation to act. The only way to improve some areas was wholesale slum clearance, and this was the solution imposed in several regions of Swansea, notably Greenhill (current Dyfatty and Alexandra Road area), an area with massive overcrowding and consequent disproportionate incidence of cholera cases. It was populated largely by Irish immigrants, many of whom had fled the potato famines. Several of the landlords of Greenhill making great profits from their rents, and who required recompense for the loss of their properties, were local dignitaries, including Lewis Llewelyn Dillwyn, MP. (Dean)

Sewage and pollution were also part of the cause of the decline of the oyster trade centred on Mumbles, also known as Oystermouth. Kilvert's diary described a thriving and ancient industry in 1872; within five years, it had almost completely collapsed.

== Industrial decline ==
The construction of the Taff Vale Railway and the Bute West Dock in the 1840s resulted in Cardiff surpassing Swansea as the principal coal port in South Wales, and by 1871 Cardiff's population exceeded that of Swansea. In the late 19th century, Swansea copper smelters faced increased foreign competition, and some of the leading smelters in the region diversified into other non-ferrous metals. In the ferrous sector, rapid growth in demand for tinplate - particularly in the USA - facilitated a local boom; the imposition of the McKinley Tariff in 1891 caused a significant fall in production, but tinplate continued to be a significant local economic activity into the first half of the 20th century, with demand buoyant during the two world wars.

During the Second World War, Swansea's Queen's Dock was one end of the world's first test of a full-scale submarine oil pipeline, in Operation Pluto. Swansea was a target for Nazi German bombing raids due to its industries, the port, and railways. By the end of the so-called Three Nights' Blitz, three consecutive nights of particularly intensive bombing in February 1941, the town centre was flattened, along with many residential streets. Rebuilding post-war was in typical British nineteen-fifties style and much of the result is regarded with high favour by neither residents nor visitors. One consequence of the bombing and rebuilding is the movement of the town centre by about half a mile. Pre-war, the town centre was on an axis around High Street and Wind Street. Post-war, Oxford Street and the new road the Kingsway took more prominence.

The Mumbles Railway was closed in 1960. By 1960, industry in the valley was in steep decline and the landscape was littered with abandoned metalworks and the waste from them. The Lower Swansea Valley Scheme was started: an attempt to reclaim the polluted land into something usable. The Enterprise Zone at Llansamlet is built on part of this land. Further down the river, the Tawe was diverted—again—and the Parc Tawe development sits on top of the old North Dock. The old South Dock area now holds the Leisure Centre and Marina.

== See also ==
- Swansea
- History of Wales
- List of Scheduled Monuments in Swansea
- Swansea Vale Railway
- Swansea and Mumbles Railway

== Bibliography ==
- Davies, John (1990). A History of Wales. London: Penguin Books.
- Gabb, Gerald (1987) The Life and Times of the Swansea and Mumbles Railway Cowbridge: D. Brown and Sons.
- Gabb, Gerald (2007). Swansea and its History. Volume I. Swansea: Gerald Gabb. ISBN 978-0-9527151-2-2.
- Gabb, Gerald (2019). Swansea and its History. Volume II: The Riverside Town. Part 1: The Men of Power. Swansea: Gerald Gabb. ISBN 978-0-9527151-4-6.
- Gabb, Gerald (2019). Swansea and its History. Volume II: The Riverside Town. Part 2: The Town, The Port, The People. Swansea: Gerald Gabb. ISBN 978-0-9527151-5-3.
- Gabb, Gerald (2019). Swansea and its History. Volume II: The Riverside Town. Part 3: Castle, Churches, Inns, Markets, Sources. Swansea: Gerald Gabb. ISBN 978-0-9527151-6-0.
- Gabb, Gerald (2024). Swansea and its History. Volume III: The 20th Century. Part 1: Some Ideas on Changes. Swansea: Gerald Gabb. ISBN 978-0-9527151-7-7.
- Hughes, Stephen (2005) Copperopolis: Landscapes of the Early Industrial Period in Swansea, Aberystwyth: Royal Commission on the Ancient and Historical Monuments of Wales. ISBN 1-871184-27-4
- Miskell, Louise (2004) Swansea Bay 1904, Old Ordnance Survey Maps. England & Wales Sheet 247
- Miskell, Louise (2006). 'Intelligent Town': An Urban History of Swansea, 1780-1855. Cardiff: University of Wales Press. ISBN 978-0-7083-2510-0.
- Lower Swansea Valley Factsheets, numbers 1 to 8 Swansea Museum Services
