= Thomas Pardoe (painter) =

English painter

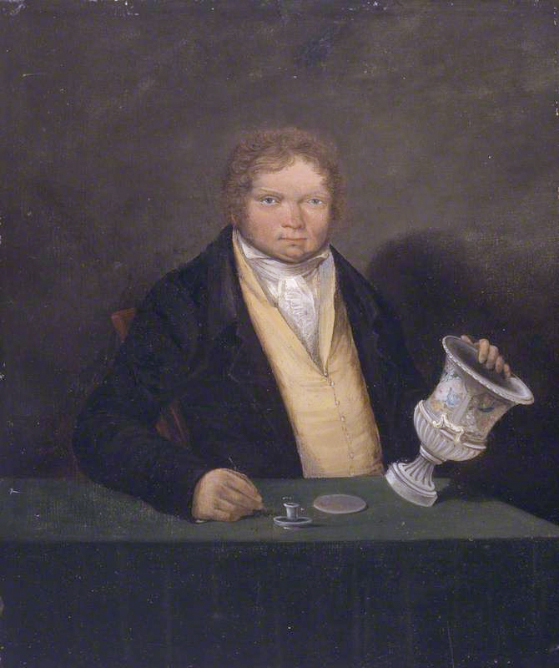
Self portrait (c. 1810–1820)

Thomas Pardoe (3 July 1770 – 1823) was a British enameler noted for flower painting.

Pardoe was born in Derby on 3 July 1770 and was apprenticed at the Derby (Nottingham Road) porcelain factory in the 1780s, later moving to Worcester. He painted creamware at Swansea between 1795 and 1809 for Cambrian Pottery, coming under the influence of potter and botanist Lewis Weston Dillwyn, and working together with William Weston Young. The following addresses are listed for him in the Bristol directories: Under the Bank (1809–11); 28 Bath Street (1812–16), and Thomas Street (1820–22).

In Bristol he was an independent decorator and gilder, painting china and pottery supplied in the white by John Rose of Coalport and possibly others. His Bristol pieces are the only ones he signed e.g., "Pardoe Bristol". I assume that only the signatures that include the word "fecit" are ones he decorated, other inscriptions simply indicating retailing. According to Pountney the enamel was fired at the Temple Pottery. He also worked on glass, as the directory listing for 1813 describe him as a "China and glass enameler and gilder, wholesale and retail". He also retailed pieces decorated at John Rose's factory, and probably from the rival Coalport factory operated by John's brother Thomas. Pardoe is particularly associated with botanical scenes and used illustrations from Curtis's Botanical Magazine as the basis for many of his decorations.

He went to Nantgarw in 1821 at the invitation of William Weston Young, and died in 1823. He is buried in Eglwysilan Churchyard, S.E. of Pontypridd in South Wales. His sketch book is now in the V&A Museum.

In 1833 William Henry Pardoe, son of Thomas Pardoe, took over Nantgarw Pottery and began manufacturing stoneware bottles and brown glazed earthenware known as Rockingham pottery. He also began manufacturing clay tobacco pipes, many of which were exported to Ireland. The business continued under Pardoe's descendants, and at its peak produced around 10,000 pipes a week, until its closure in 1920, when cigarettes replaced such clay pipes.

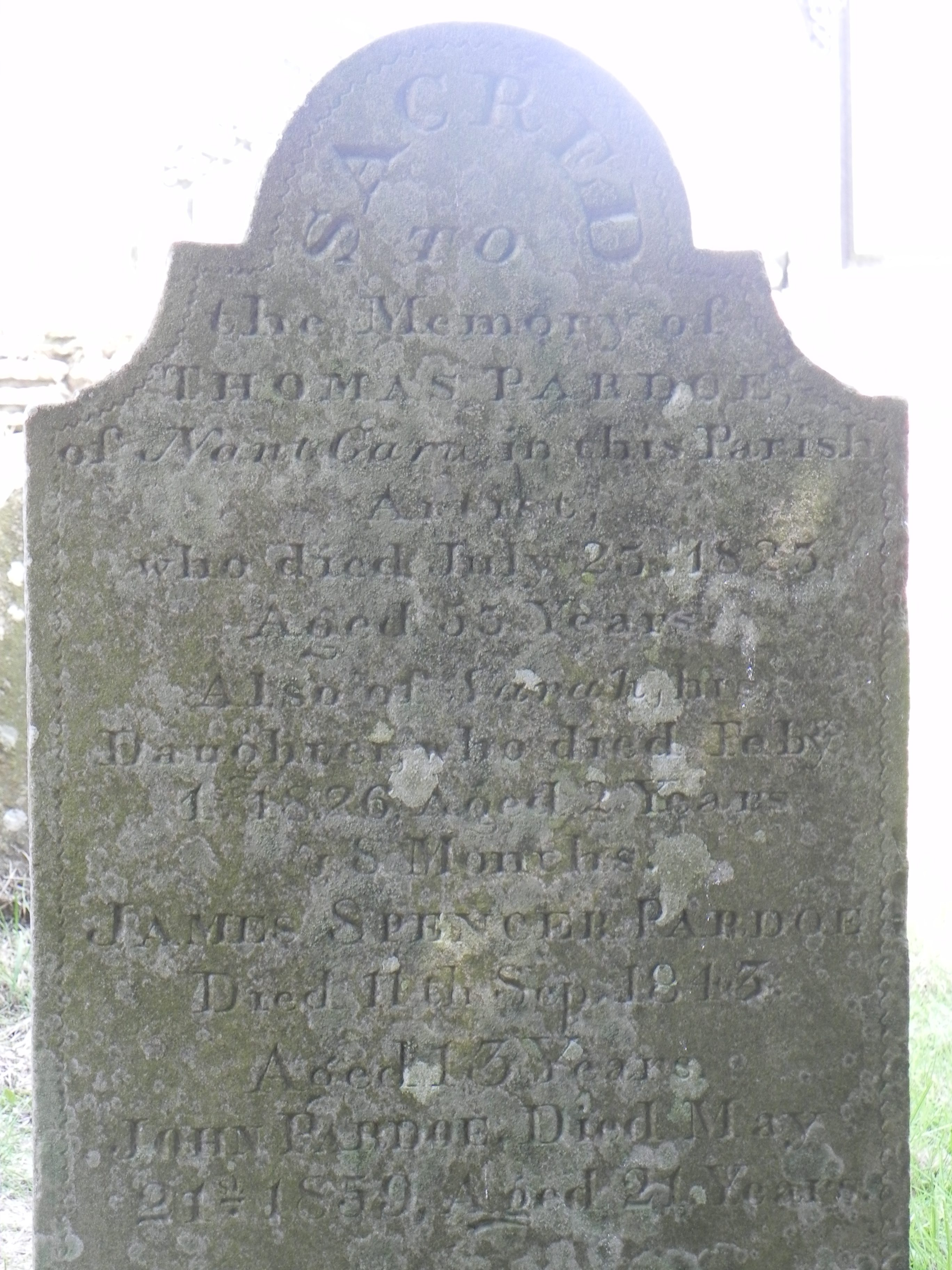
Gravestone in St Ilan's churchyard, Eglwysilan
