= Coalport porcelain =

Centre of porcelain and pottery production

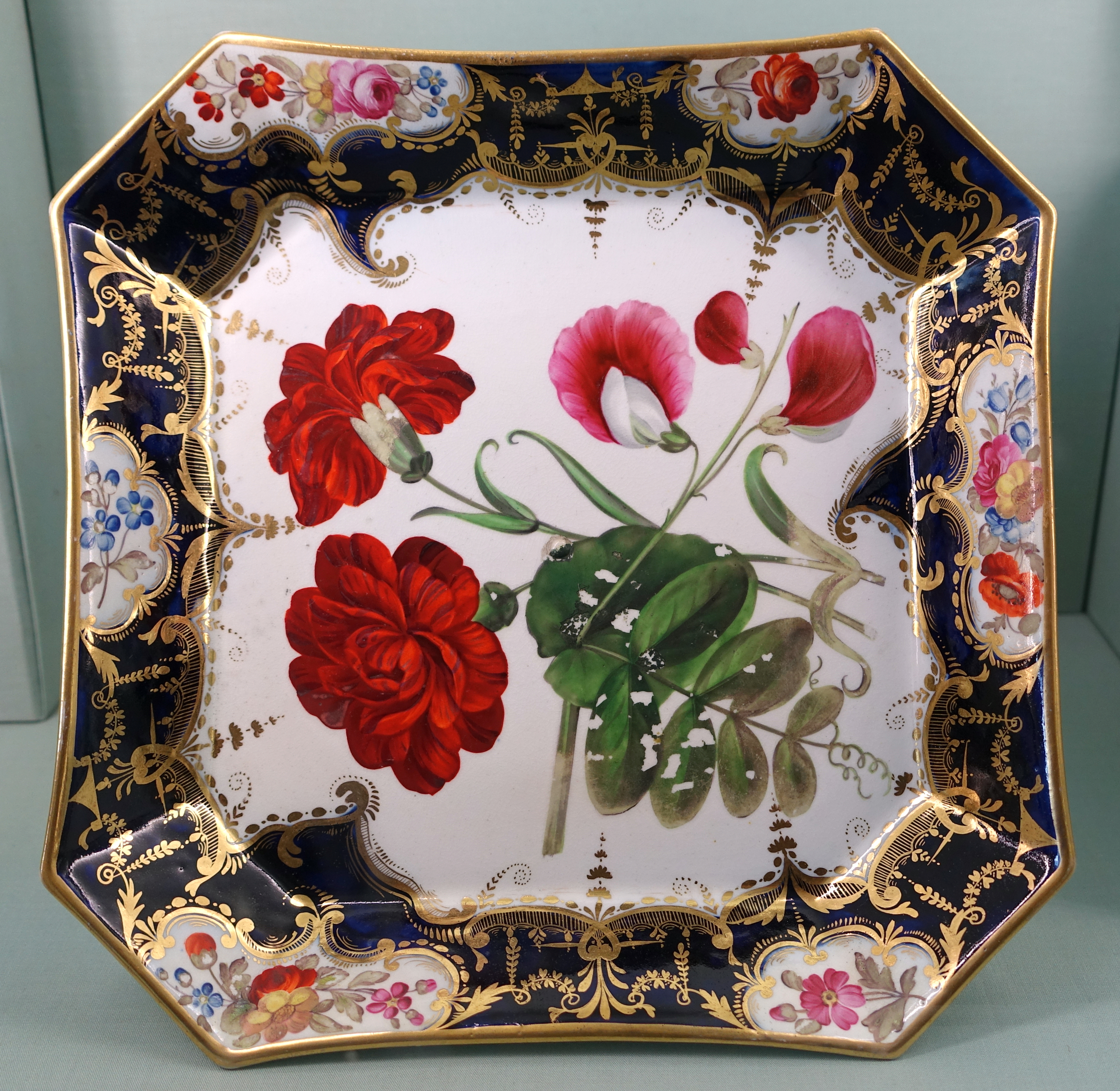
Plate from the Harewood House botanical dessert service, probably 1830s–1840s

Coalport, Shropshire, England was a centre of porcelain and pottery production between about 1795 ("inaccurately" claimed as 1750 by the company) and 1926, with the Coalport porcelain brand continuing to be used up to the present. The opening in 1792 of the Coalport Canal, which joins the River Severn at Coalport, had increased the attractiveness of the site, and from 1800 until a merger in 1814 there were two factories operating, one on each side of the canal, making rather similar wares which are now often difficult to tell apart.

Both factories made mostly tablewares that had elaborate overglaze decoration, mostly with floral subjects. A further round of mergers in 1819 brought moulds and skilled staff from Nantgarw porcelain and Swansea porcelain to Coalbrookdale, which continued to thrive through the rest of the century. The Coalport factory was founded by John Rose in 1795; he continued to run it successfully until his death in 1841. The company often sold its wares as Coalbrookdale porcelain, especially the pieces with flowers modelled in three dimensions, and they may be called Coalport China.

== Wares ==
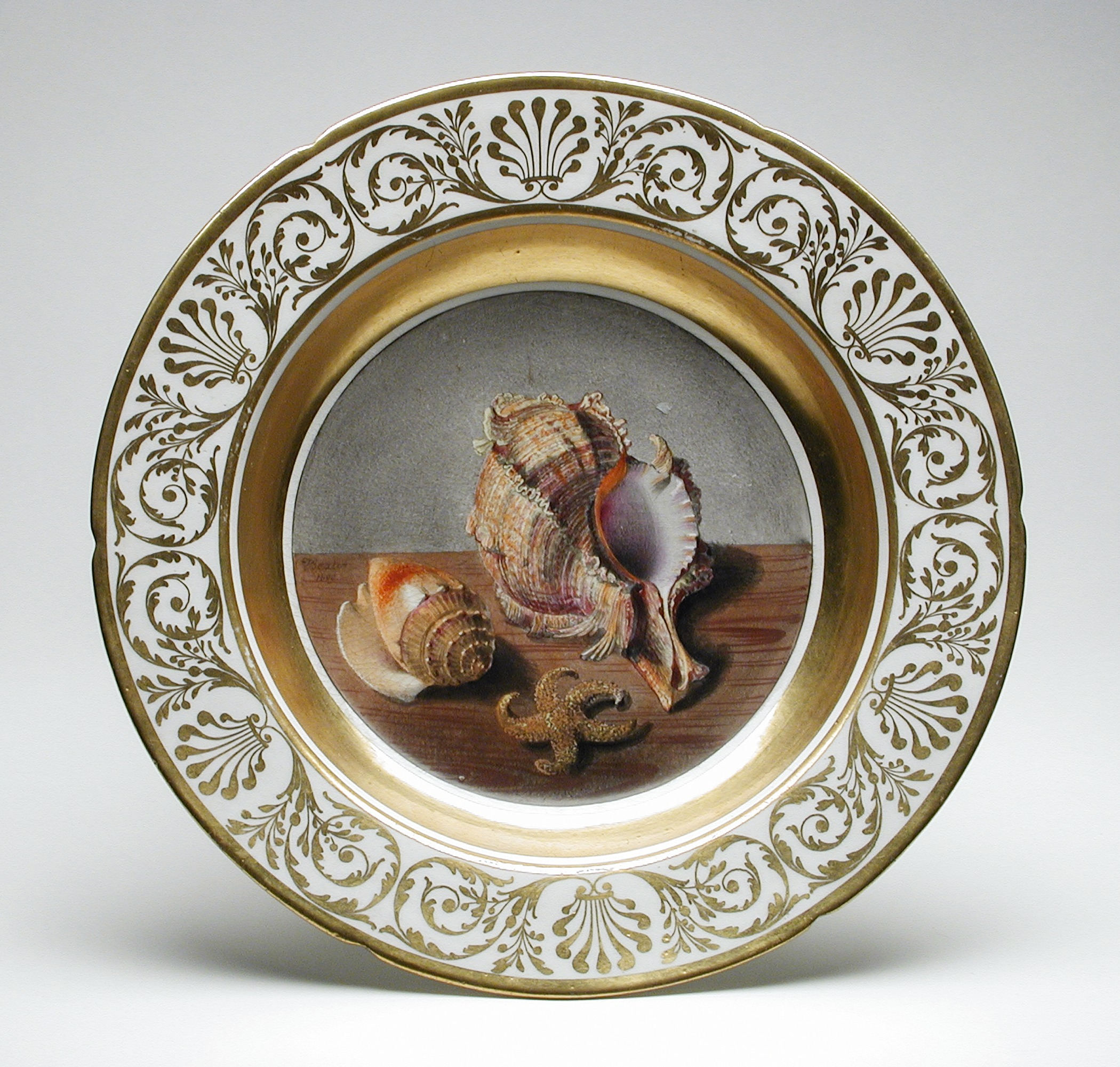
Soup plate, 1809

Rose employed William Billingsley, formerly at Nantgarw, as chief painter, and Billingsley's chemist, Walker, who initiated at Coalport a maroon glaze and brought the Nantgarw technical recipes to Rose at Coalport. It is speculated that at least one of the figures used in the 1850s designs was created by sculptor Ellen Shenton.

Coalport and Coalbrookdale specialised in dinner services. The familiar "Indian tree" pattern, which is based in fact on Chinese rather than Indian prototypes, was originated at Coalport; variants have been produced by virtually all the British manufacturers of table wares and continue to be available today. Models that originated at Meissen and Sèvres were copied at Coalbrookdale in the mid-19th century, sometimes with misleading marks, "a practice which ought to have been avoided", William Chaffers observed. Sprigged floral encrusted decoration was also typical of Coalport wares, such as vases, small boxes and table baskets.

In 1820 Rose received the gold medal of the Society of Arts for his feldspar porcelain and an improved, lead-free glaze, with which the enamel colours fused in firing. Favourite patterns were the "worm sprig" and the "Tournai sprig" introduced by Billingsley at Pinxton, the Dresden-inspired "Berlin china edge", and the blue transfer willow pattern and blue dragon pattern.

During the 1830s the factory initiated the practice of applying a light transfer printed blue outline, to guide the painters. This preserved some of the freedom of hand-painted decoration, while it enabled Rose to keep up the pace of production. The technique was widely adopted by other manufactories during the 19th century.

At the Great Exhibition (London 1851) an elaborate Coalport table service with deep borders of mazarin blue was shown; it had been commissioned by Queen Victoria as a gift to Tsar Nicholas I of Russia.

In the second half of the 19th century the Coalport manufacturers added yet another specialisation to their repertoire of hand decorated porcelains. They developed the technique called “jewelling” whereby small beads of coloured enamel were applied most often to a gold ground. According to the auctioneers Skinner Inc, it is thought this was first developed and introduced by the Worcester porcelain factory in the mid 1860s. Turquoise seemed to be the prevalent colour, meticulously and uniformly decorating tea wares, useful wares and ornamental wares, often accompanied by a rich raised gold decoration. They were produced for sale in Britain and abroad. Two examples can be seen below.

== Business history ==
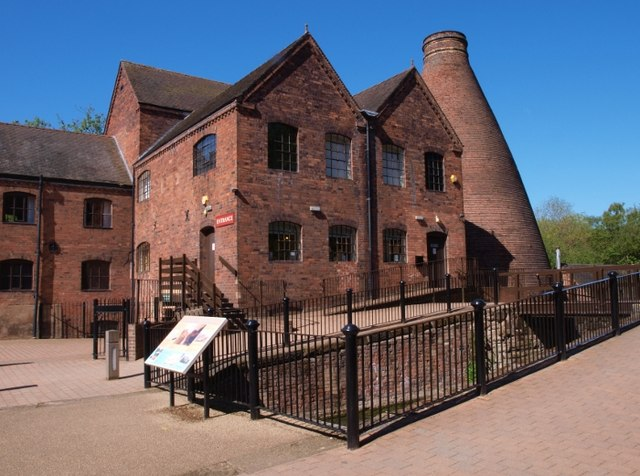
Part of the old factory, now museum, with bottle kiln behind, and the canal running through the works.

The Coalport porcelain manufactory, the first porcelain factory in the Ironbridge Gorge, England, was founded by the practical and enterprising John Rose in 1795. Financial support was provided by Edward Blakeway (1720–1811). John Rose had probably trained at the Caughley porcelain manufactory, less than a mile away on the other side of the Severn, and had been making pottery on his own account nearby at Jackfield, a mile upstream across the Severn from Coalbrookdale, since about 1793. In 1799 Rose took over the Caughley factory, continuing production there, at least of the biscuit stage, moving the wares to be decorated at Coalport.

From 1800 to 1814 Rose's brother Thomas operated a small works on the other side of the canal, initially with William Reynolds (died 1803), an industrialist, and Robert Horton. After Reynolds' death his cousin Robert Anstice became a partner. They were taken over by J. Rose & Co. in 1814 The same year John Rose moved the Caughley production the short distance to the Coalport site.

Rose's rapid success enabled him to buy the Nantgarw porcelain manufactory in 1819 and the Swansea porcelain manufactory, with their repertory of moulds.

John Rose died in 1841; the enterprise was continued under the former name "John Rose & Co." by his nephew W.F. Rose and William Pugh. William Pugh continued the production as sole proprietor from 1862 until his death in 1875, after which the company was put in receivership by his heirs. It was purchased in 1880 by the East Anglian engineer Peter Bruff (died 1900), who reinstated it as the Coalport China Company. Under the management of his son Charles Bruff from 1889, an extensive export trade to the United States and Canada was initiated in the 1890s, and the works were rebuilt on the original site in 1902.

During the 1920s it fell again into financial difficulties and was eventually taken over by the Cauldon Potteries, Ltd., of Shelton, Staffordshire, in 1925. In 1926 production moved to Staffordshire, the traditional centre of the ceramics industry in Britain. In 1958 Messrs E. Brain & Co LTD owners of the Foley China works took over the name of Coalport China Ltd, transferring business to Foley China Works. The combining of the two companies was completed in 1963 from which date all production continued solely under the Coalport. In 1967 the company became part of the Wedgwood group. In 1985 it was moved to the Minerva Works in Park Street, Fenton, which had been the works of “The Crown Staffordshire Porcelain & Co Ltd” who themselves had become part of the Wedgwood Group in 1973.

Llewellynn Jewitt published a History of the Coalport Porcelain Works in 1862. The standard modern monographic history is Geoffrey A. Godden, Coalport and Coalbrookdale Porcelain (London 1970).

The original manufactory buildings now houses the Coalport China Museum, as well as a YHA Youth Hostel, cafe, artists' studios and a handmade arts and crafts shop.

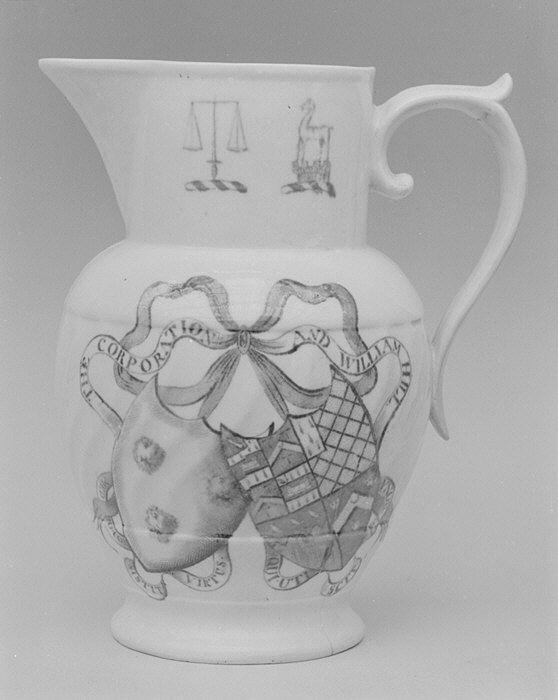
Early election jug, c. 1802, with transfer-printed decoration. Hybrid hard paste porcelain.

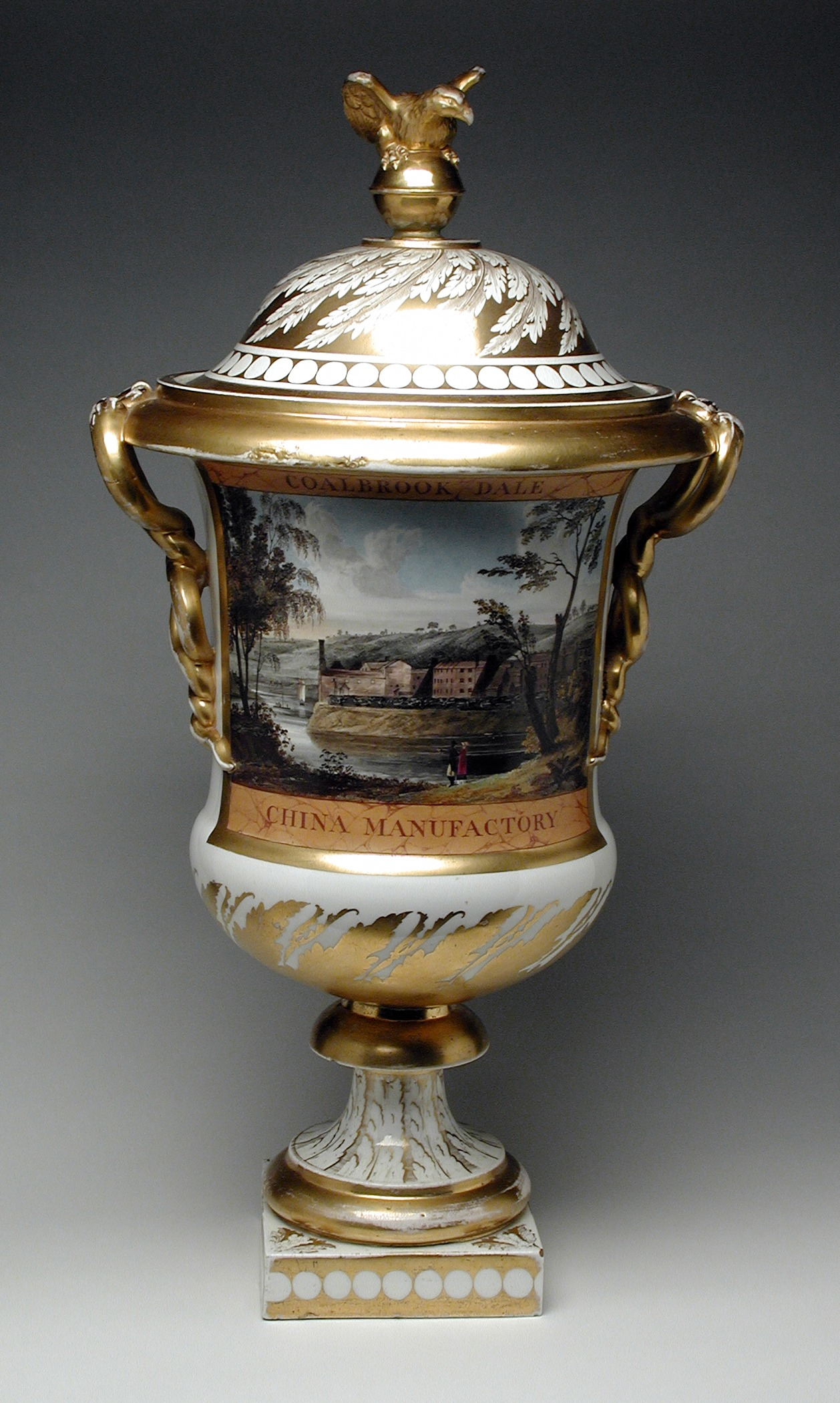
Covered vase with scene of the factory and Coalbrookdale, c. 1810, 21 1/3 in. (54.19 cm) high

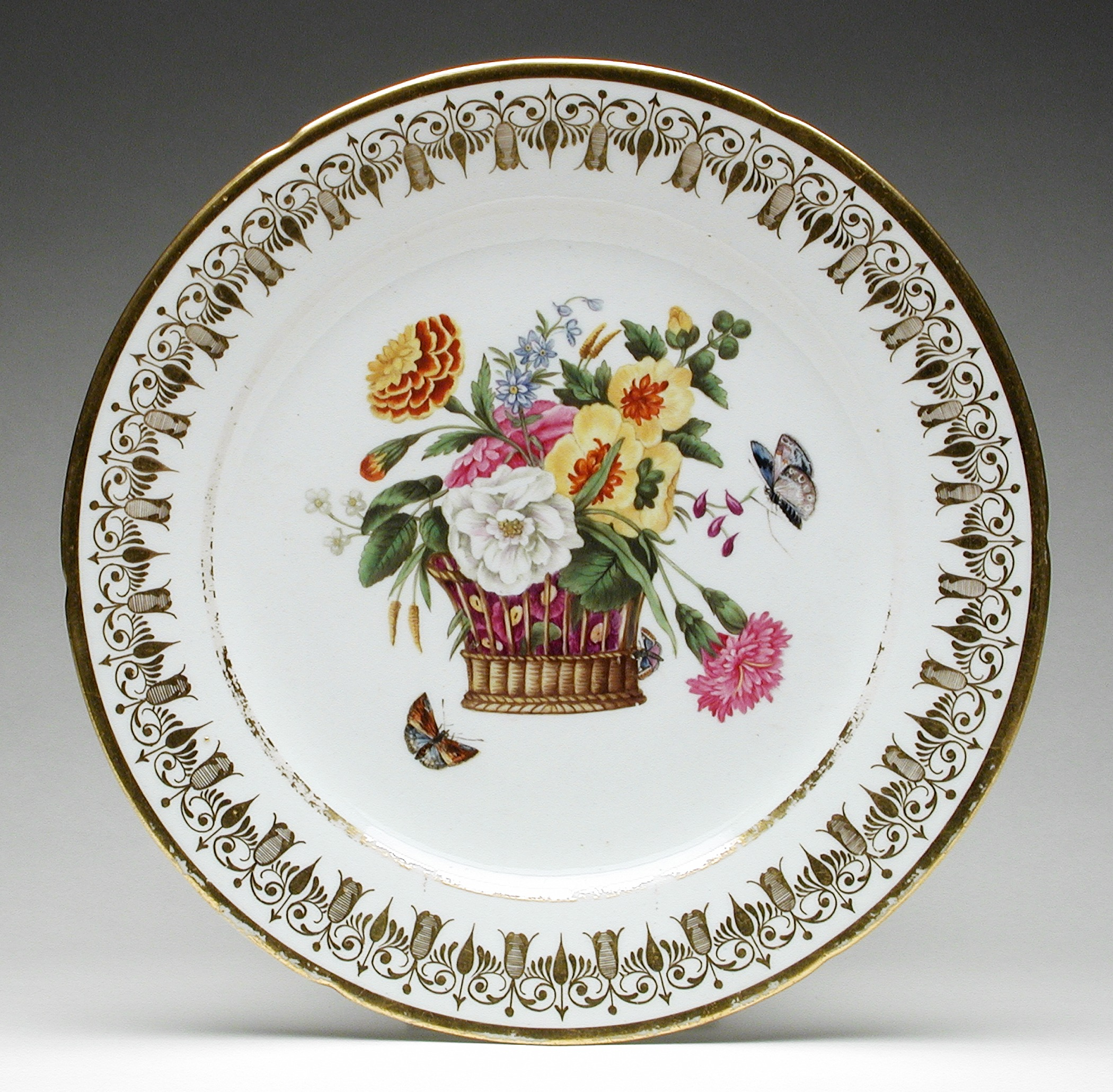
Plate, c. 1815

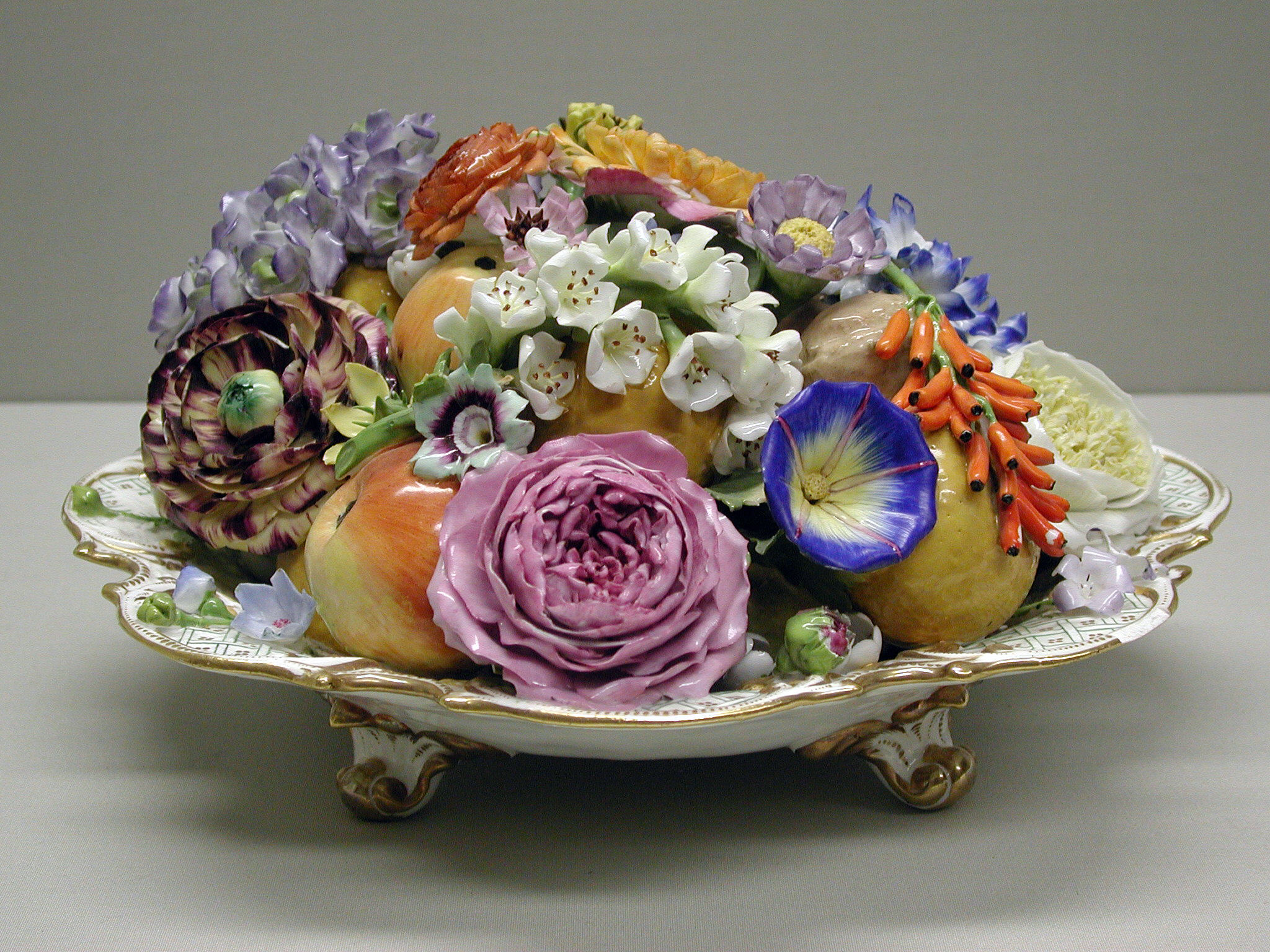
Floral centrepiece, c. 1840, bone china. This type of piece is often called Coalbrookdale porcelain

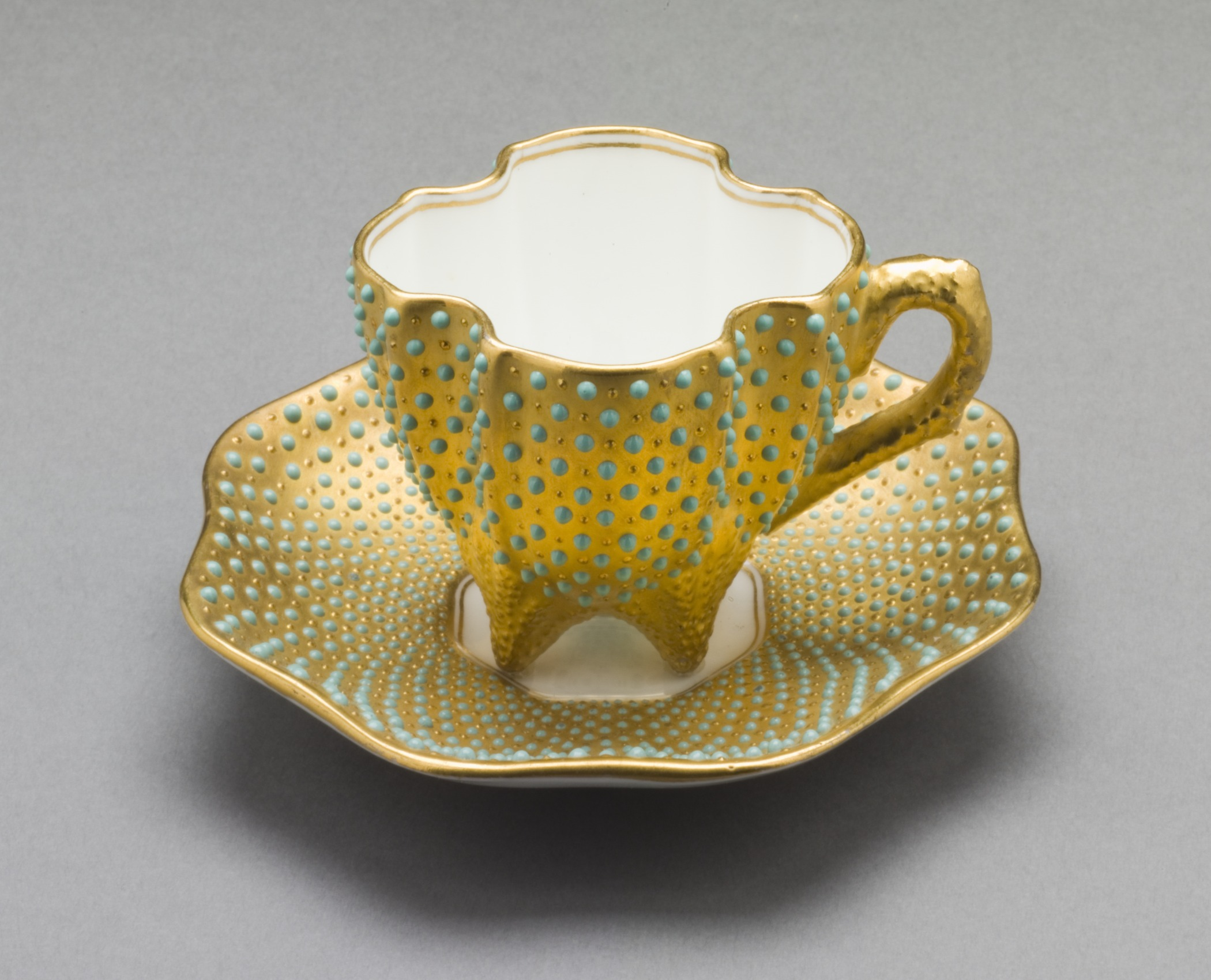
Jeweled demi-tasse cup and saucer "with sea-urchin foam", c. 1890

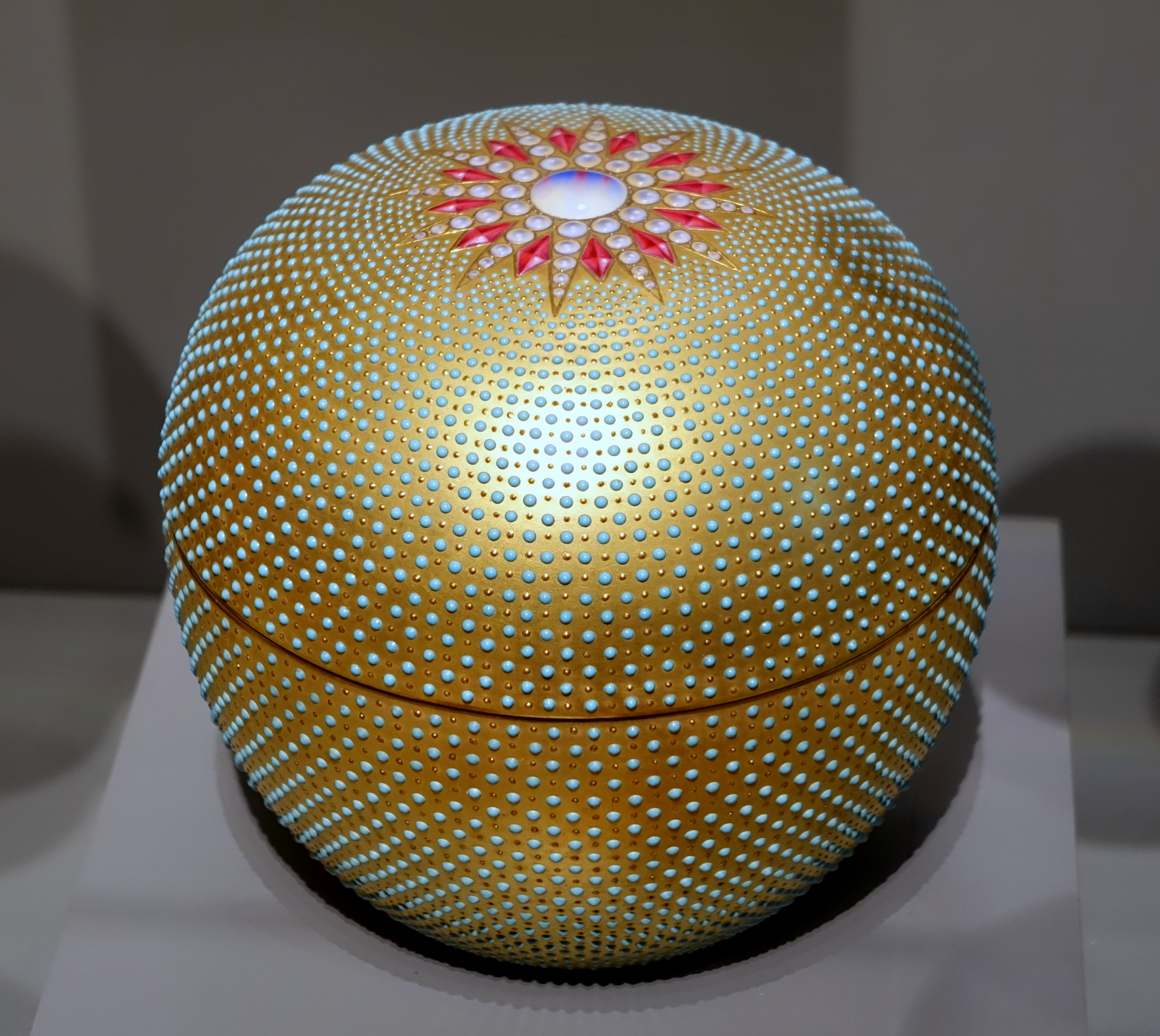
Jeweled bonbonnière, c. 1891-1919

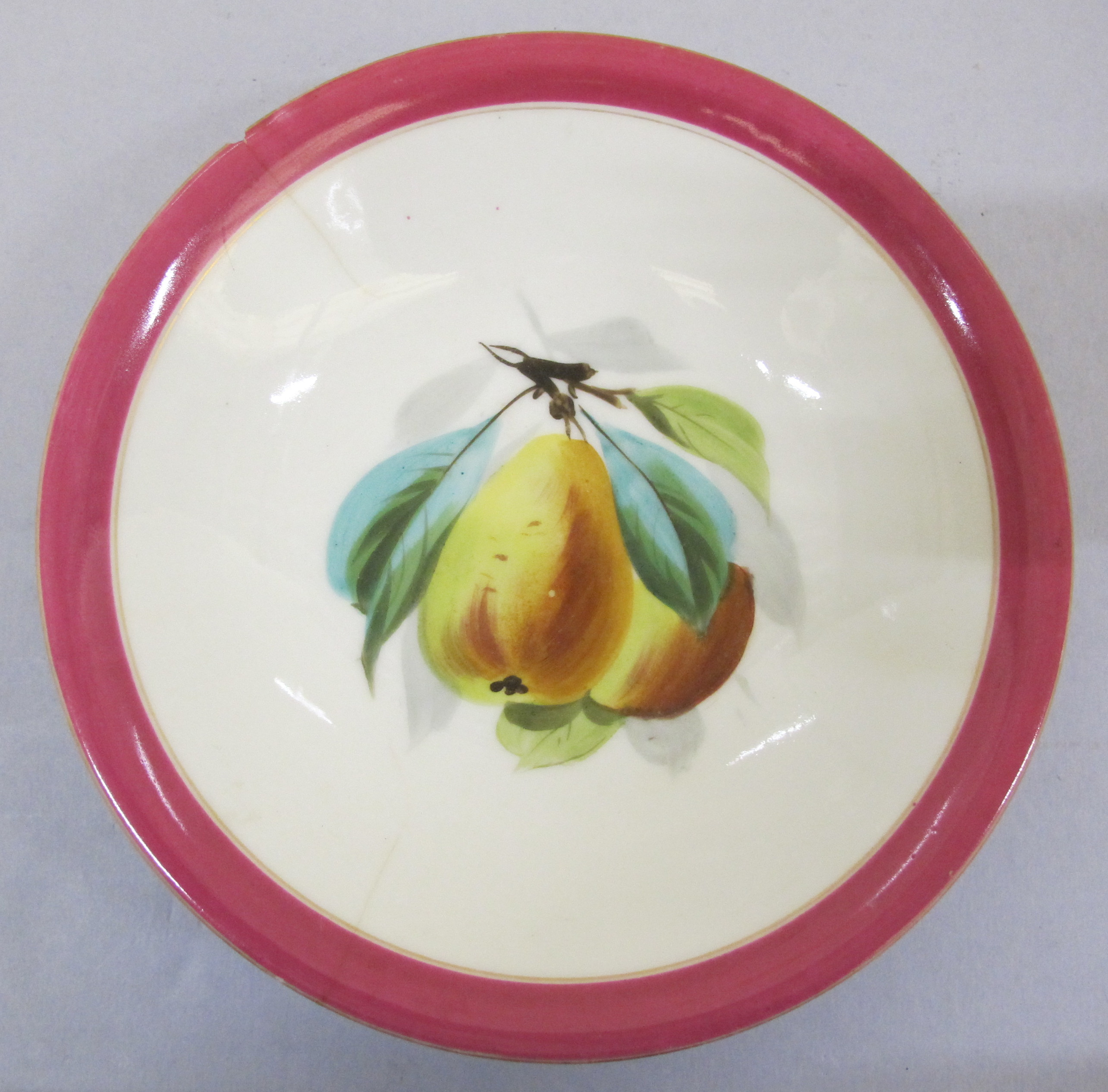
Plate, before 1967 (1950s?)

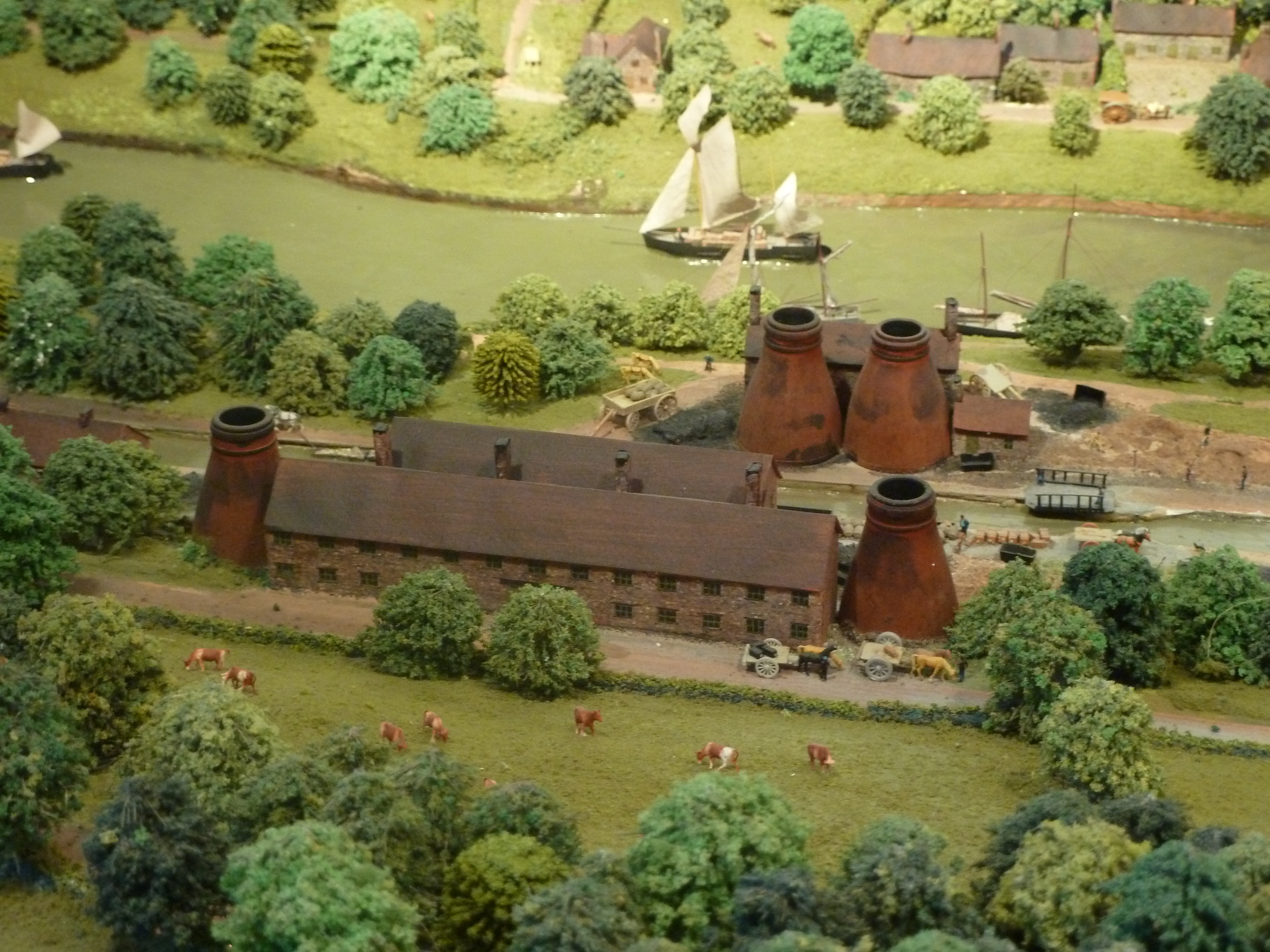
Diorama of the site, around 1820, in the Museum of the Gorge, Ironbridge

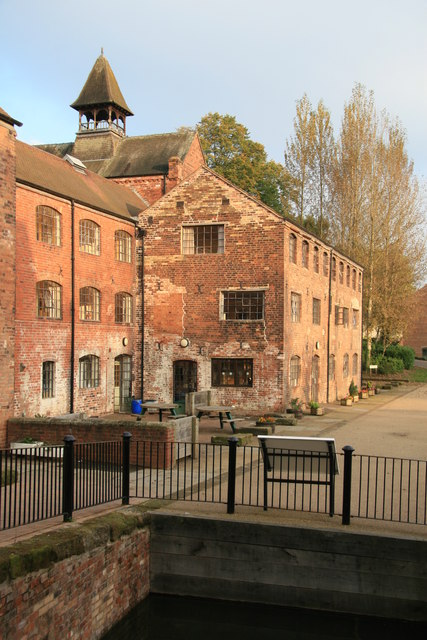
Earliest part of the original works at Coalport, now housing a café and hostel
