= William Weston Young =

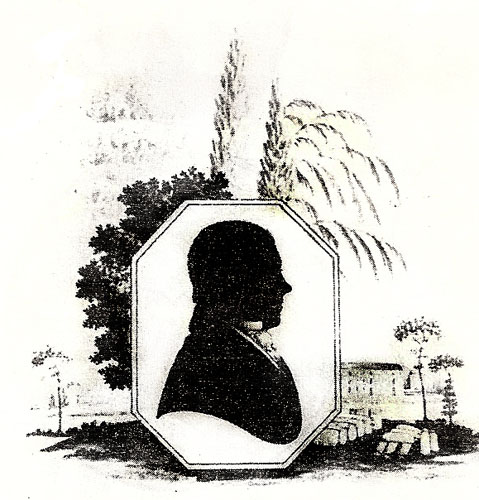
The only known image of William Weston Young, in the Quaker silhouette style

William Weston Young (1776–1847) was an English Quaker entrepreneur, artist, botanist, wreck-raiser, surveyor, potter, and inventor of the firebrick.

== Biography ==
William Weston Young was born on 20 April 1776 at Lewin's Mead, Bristol, England, into a devout Quaker family, the third son of Edward Young, a Bristolian merchant and Sarah (Sally) Young (née Weston). He was educated at Gildersome Quaker boarding school in Yorkshire, which among other things gave him a rudimentary knowledge of science which he was later to apply in his invention of the silica firebrick.

After a flustered attempt to emigrate to America in 1794, involving his ship being captured by a fleet of French men-of-war, his ultimate escape from captivity and arduous journey home, Young settled back in Bristol, found employment and married fellow Quaker, Elizabeth Davis, in April 1795. In 1798, Young had acquired the financial backing (with notable help from his uncle Thomas Young, father of the physicist, physician and egyptologist Dr Thomas Young) to lease a farm and water mill from John Llewellyn of Ynysygerwn, at Aberdulais, in the Neath Valley, Glamorganshire, Wales. After a lucrative start to his new venture as a miller, corn-factor and farmer, a large purchase of corn, beans and grist coinciding with the Treaty of Amiens, which crashed the value of his goods, as well as some unfortunate dealings with men of false credit brought Young into trouble with his own creditors, and was made bankrupt in May 1802.

== The Cambrian Pottery and friendship with Lewis Weston Dillwyn ==
Young's early bankruptcy had lasting impact upon his career. No longer independent, he sought employment and put his artistic skills to use. On 23 January 1803, Young and his wife moved to new lodgings in Swansea, Glamorganshire, where he had gained employment under fellow Quaker, Lewis Weston Dillwyn, as a "draftsman" at Dillwyn's Cambrian Pottery, where he remained until August 1806. Dillwyn and Young, both in their mid-twenties, struck up a close friendship due to their common interest in natural history. Many of Young's painted wares feature accurately depicted flora and fauna as well as the taxonomic names of the illustrated species. Collections of this pottery can be seen at the V&A Museum, South Kensington, The National Museum of Wales, Cardiff and at the Glynn Vivian Art Gallery, Swansea.

During this period, Young shared his time between decorating the Cambrian Pottery's best porcelain and assisting with Dillwyn's botanical fieldwork. Between 1802 and 1814, Dillwyn worked on a groundbreaking study of British algae species, The British Confervae. Young's illustrative plates are to be found from Part III onwards in Dillwyn's publications. In Part IV, Dillwyn credits Young with the discovery of:

- Conferva dissiliens, (Plate 63), in Crymlyn Bog, Swansea,
- Conferva youngana, (Plate 102), in the limestone rock pools near Dunraven Castle, Glamorganshire.

Young's discoveries and collaboration on the work with Dillwyn earned him Associate Membership of the Linnaean Society.

== Wreck-raising, surveying and Thomas Mansel Talbot's tomb ==
In 1806, Young conceived of an improved "grab" or "forceps" mechanism to be used in wreck-raising and set about a wreck-raising business, retrieving sunken vessels in the Bristol Channel. His first commission to raise the freight ship Anne and Teresa, salvaged a cargo of copper, made him enough money to establish himself comfortably in the village of Newton Nottage, Glamorganshire as a wreck-raiser, merchant and farmer. In 1811, the death of established local surveyor John Williams of Newland, near Margam, Glamorgan, enabled Young to add surveyor to his list of occupations, filling the niche that Newland left in the region for the next decade.

It was during his work as a surveyor that Young, an amateur geologist too, discovered the potential of a limestone found at Mumbles, Swansea being fashioned as marble. In 1814, Thomas Mansel Talbot (1747–1814) (father of Christopher Rice Mansel Talbot (1803–1890)) died at Penrice, Gower, Glamorganshire and Young was commissioned to design Talbot's tomb using locally sourced minerals. The tomb is a large and elaborate edifice, deploying Penrice alabaster and Mumbles marble, and took six years of design and modelling before its completion in February 1820 in the nave of Margam Abbey Church, Margam, Glamorganshire.

== The Nantgarw Pottery ==
In early 1814, Young became the major investor in William Billingsley and Samuel Walker's venture; the Nantgarw Pottery, Nantgarw, Glamorganshire. Billingsley and Walker, through their prior ties with Flight, Barr & Barr at Royal Worcester had signed an agreement not to disclose their new porcelain recipe to a third party, but there was no clause preventing them from using that recipe themselves. The pottery was set up, but something of Billingsley & Walker's understanding of the recipe or manufacturing process was amiss, as 90% of the porcelain was ruined in the firing. The resources of the three associates soon ran out, and the group approached the British Government's Committee of Trade and Plantations asking for a grant of £500, referring to the subsidy the French Government had given the famous Sèvres Porcelain Factory. They were not successful, but one member of the committee, porcelain enthusiast Sir Joseph Banks, suggested to his friend and ceramicist Lewis Weston Dillwyn of the Cambrian Pottery of Swansea, Glamorganshire, should make an inspection and report on the matter.

Dillwyn made the inspection, and saw the extent of the firm's losses, but was so impressed with the quality of the surviving pieces that he offered Billingsley and Walker use of the Cambrian Pottery to improve their recipe and process. An annexe was built for porcelain production at the Cambrian Pottery, where Walker and Billingsley were based from late 1814. During this time, Young was preoccupied with the construction of the Tomb of Thomas Mansel Talbot, at Margam Abbey. Billingsley's porcelain recipe was modified and improved, but was still wasteful enough for Dillwyn to abandon the project in Swansea and in 1817, the pair returned to Nantgarw. Young reinvested in the pottery at Nantgarw, additionally becoming an art teacher at Cowbridge Free School to help raise the funds. Billingsley and Walker continued to fire their porcelain at a loss, until one day in April 1820, while Young was away in Bristol, the pair absconded to Coalport leaving behind them the lease to the pottery and several thousand pieces of undecorated porcelain in various stages of production.

Young put the Nantgarw Pottery and its contents up for sale via public auction in October 1820, enabling him to buy-out his minor partners and become sole proprietor. He invited his friend and former co-working artist from the Cambrian Pottery, Thomas Pardoe, to aid him with the completion and decoration of the salvaged porcelain. Young and Pardoe experimented to perfect a glaze for the biscuitware, but were unable to add to Billingsley's stockpile of porcelain, having no access to his recipe. The final sales of the finished porcelain (sold between 1821 and 1822), paid Pardoe and his staff's salaries in arrears, but failed to recoup Young's total losses, leaving Young narrowly avoiding a further bankruptcy.

The rare surviving pieces of Nantgarw porcelain are considered today to be among the most valuable artefacts ever produced in Wales. Collections of this pottery can be seen at The V&A Museum, South Kensington, London and The National Museum of Wales, Cardiff.

In 1833, the Nantgarw estate was sold to William Henry Pardoe, son of Thomas Pardoe.

== The Dinas firebrick ==
Location of Dinas Rock within the Fforest Fawr Geopark (pink area) and Brecon Beacons National Park (pink plus green areas)

Young's experience of firing ceramics, together with his familiarity with the region as a local surveyor and his amateur interests in geology, enabled him to conceive of a heat-proof, blast-furnace brick, using silica found in large deposits at the head of the Neath Valley. The process of "vitrifying" the walls of a ceramic brick-built furnace had been patented by William Harry of the Swansea Valley in 1817, but Young's solution was to build the whole furnace from a "silica firebrick," made with a 1% addition of lime, to bind the blue-grey "clay" of the Dinas rock. The idea being that the interior of the blast furnace would vitrify and be vastly more durable and ultimately economical, than a mere veneer of silica within a comparatively fragile ceramic shell. Young made early experiments with the recipe and fired his trial bricks at the Nantgarw Pottery kilns, while he and Pardoe finished the Billingsley porcelain for sale between 1820 and 1821, when he finalised his recipe.

In 1822, Young applied to the Marquis of Bute to lease the lands near Craig-y-Dinas, Pontneddfechan, in the upper Neath Valley for a period of twenty-one years. Young had the lease, and the patent (No. 5047) but had no funds left to set up the required brickworks. He sought financial backing from a number of sources, including his extended family once more and on 19 October 1822, the Dinas Fire Brick Co. was established in a partnership involving David Morgan, a Neath ironmonger; John Player; and Joseph Young (William Weston Young's older brother). (W.W. Young was a party but could not be a partner in the final enterprise, owing to his previous bankruptcy in 1802 at Aberdulais watermill.) A brickworks was built at Pontwalby, about a mile down river from Craig-y-Dinas.

The lucrative company, which sold bricks to industry across the world, transferred through many hands, but the Young family held their shares throughout, finally passing via Joseph Young to his son William Weston Young Junior (1798–1866). (William Weston Young had no children). From The Dinas Firebrick Co. to John Player & Co. in 1825, to Riddles, Young & Co. in 1829 and finally, becoming world famous as Young & Allen in 1852, the company brochure later mentions that it had supplied firebricks to Swansea's White Rock Copper Works for forty years.

== Later years ==
Frontispiece of Young's 1835, featuring a depiction of Neath Castle

The Dinas Firebrick Works experienced some financial and technical troubles during 1829, and Young laid out further monies to support his nephew William Weston Young Jr.'s stake in the company, but the company traded at limited profits for some time, requiring Young to start painting commercially yet again, this time in watercolours of the Neath Valley, where he had moved once more, to Fairyland House, near the Ivy Tower on the Mackworth Estate, Tonna, Neath, Glamorganshire.

In 1835, Young published an 85-page illustrated book Guide to the Scenery and Beauties of Glyn Neath, published by John Wright & Co. Bristol and sold by Longman, Rees, Orme, Browne & Co. of London. The naive but charming book comprises a prose guide to the Neath Valley and is illustrated with landscapes, scenery and decorative topographical and geological maps.

Young's wife Elizabeth died following an awkward fall in March 1842, prompting Young to publish in 1843 The Christian Experience of Elizabeth Young, as a tribute to her, again published by Young's friend, John Wright & Co., Bristol.

William Weston Young's profit share from the Dinas Firebrick Works was ultimately a modest pension, and he died in relative poverty in Lower Mitton, Kidderminster on 5 March 1847.

== Secondary resources ==
Bibliography

Jenkins, Elis. "William Weston Young." The Glamorgan Historian, Volume 5. Stewart Williams Publishers; ISBN 0-900807-43-1 p. 61–101

Jenkins, Rhys. "The Silica Brick and its Inventor, William Weston Young." Transactions of the Newcomen Society. 1942.

Jones, Penelope. Quaker entrepreneur: William Weston Young and the Welsh porcelain from Swansea and Nantgarw. Antique Collector 62/7 1991. p. 78–81

Morton-Nance, E. The Pottery and Porcelain of Swansea and Nantgarw. London: Batsford. 1943

Yerburgh, David S. An attempt to depict the Vale of Neath in South Wales: a pictorial journey around the Vale of Neath as undertaken by William Weston Young in 1835. Salisbury: D Yersburgh, 2001. p. 100

Young, William Weston. Guide to the Scenery and Beauties of Glyn Neath Bristol: John Wright & Co. (sold by Longman, Rees, Orme, Browne & Co. London) 1835.

Young, Elizabeth The Christian Experience of Elizabeth Young, Bristol: John Wright & Co. 1843.

== Primary resources ==
At West Glamorgan Archives Swansea:

Sally Young (1740–1811) of Bristol: Journals 1798–1811 (D/D Z 24)

William Weston Young (1776–1847) of Bristol, Aberdulais and Neath: Journals, 1801–1843 (D/D Xch); Fact Books & Plans, 1787–1840; Fact Book, 1807 (D/D Xls)

At the Library of the Society of Friends, Friends House, London:

Quaker Digest Registers, Births, Marriages and Deaths by regional microfiche.
