= The Cambrian =

First newspaper published in Wales

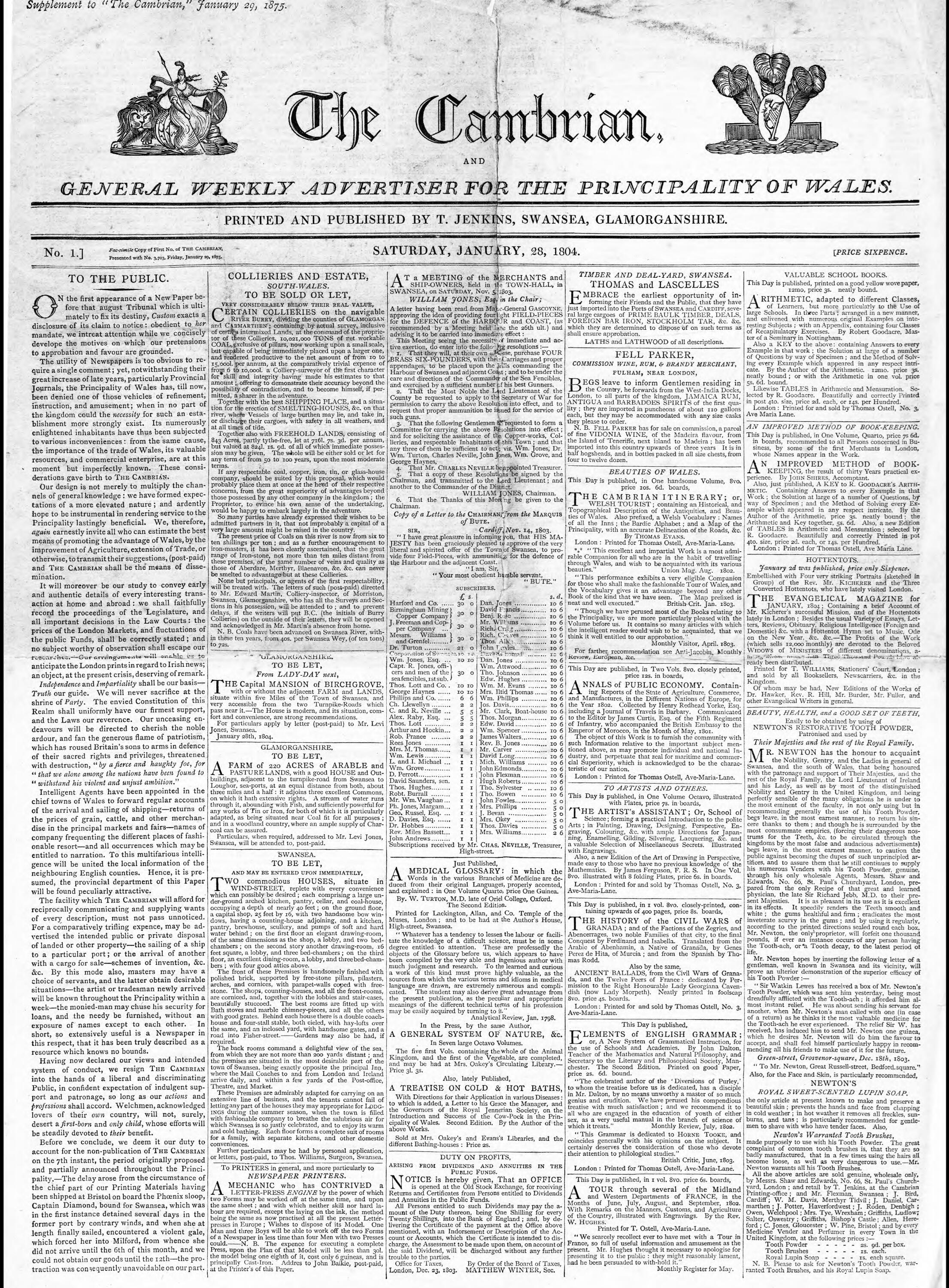
- The Cambrian, and general weekly advertiser for the principality of Wales
- Type: weekly newspaper
- Format: 4, 8 pages
- Owner(s): Lewis Weston Dillwyn (1804; 1817), Thomas Jenkins (January 1804; January 1822), Williams, Murray & Rees (1823; 1844), John Williams (1852; 1870), George Haynes (1804; 1826)
- Founder(s): George Haynes, Lewis Weston Dillwyn
- Publisher: Thomas Jenkins, E. Jenkins, Sarah Jenkins, W. C. Murray and D. Rees, David Rees
- Editor: Thomas Jenkins[*], John Roby[*]
- Launched: 28 January 1804
- Ceased publication: March 1930
- City: Swansea
- Country: Wales
- OCLC number: 173730110

The Cambrian, a weekly newspaper started by George Haynes and L. W. Dillwyn in 1804, was the first newspaper published in Wales. Its original publisher was Thomas Jenkins. The full masthead proclaimed The Cambrian and Weekly General Advertiser for Swansea and the Principality of Wales. By 1906 it was acquired by South Wales Post Newspapers Co. and, in 1930, merged with Herald of Wales. Many articles in this newspaper have been indexed and the index is searchable at https://archive.swansea.gov.uk/cambrian
