= George Haynes (businessman) =

George Haynes (1745–1830) was a British entrepreneur, pottery manufacturer, banker, and newspaper proprietor of Swansea, Wales.

== Early career ==
Haynes was born in 1745 to a Quaker family with its origins in Henley-in-Arden, Warwickshire, although his exact place of birth and continuing religious affiliations are uncertain. As a young man he migrated to Philadelphia in the Quaker colony of Pennsylvania where he established himself as a merchant. He was a subscriber to the Bank of Pennsylvania in 1780 and held two shares in the Bank of North America of which he was briefly a director from 1782 until his return to Britain in 1783.

== Cambrian Pottery ==
On his return from Pennsylvania he settled in Swansea, Wales for reasons that are no longer clear. Here in about 1786 he became a partner in the Swansea Pottery. In 1790 he became managing partner and set about modernising the works along the lines adopted by Josiah Wedgwood at his Etruria works and changed the name of the works to the Cambrian Pottery. Under his management the concern flourished and produced high quality porcelain; Haynes was probably the only person in south Wales at this time to have any knowledge of the processes involved in its manufacture. Following the death of John Coles, the son of the founder of the Pottery, Haynes became the sole proprietor and traded as Haynes & Co. However, in 1802 William Dillwyn purchased the remainder of the lease and invested a substantial amount of capital in the business. Dillwyn's son, Lewis Weston Dillwyn, was taken into the firm as an active partner on instructions from his father. Haynes continued to manage the business, but the partnership was an uneasy one and in 1810 Haynes terminated the arrangement and left the pottery to concentrate on his other interests.

== Banking and related activities ==
From about 1800 Haynes was associated with Henry Pocklington in a banking house in Swansea. Following the death of Pocklington in 1816 Haynes became the senior partner and took his son, George Haynes junior, into the business. George Day and William Lawrence were subsequently admitted as partners and the bank traded as Haynes, Day, Haynes & Lawrence. This partnership subsequently extended its activities to Llanelli where it traded as the Llanelly Bank. In 1820 Haynes opened a further bank in Neath in partnership with his older son George and his younger son William Woodward Haynes. The Swansea bank acted as Treasurer to the Swansea Tontine which was formed in 1805 to build the Theatre Royal and the Assembly Rooms, with Haynes as one of its promoters and its Secretary. The following year he became Treasurer of the Swansea Society for the Education of Children and by 1816 was also Treasurer of the Swansea Savings Bank and of the Royal Swansea Lancasterian Free School.

== Other interests ==
Haynes was one of the trustees appointed under the terms of the Swansea Harbour Act 1791 (31 Geo. 3. c. 83) and continued to serve in this capacity until 1825 or later. In 1794 he was elected to the committee of the Swansea Canal on its formation and continued as a member until 1822. He was himself a trader on the canal at one time as a partner in the Brynmorgan colliery in the Swansea Valley. He also took an active part in municipal affairs and was concerned with improvements to paving and lighting the town and to its postal services. Between 1803 and 1808 he was a captain in the Western Glamorgan Infantry Volunteers.

In 1803 the publication of a weekly newspaper in Swansea was proposed. Haynes formed a company to raise the necessary capital and in 1804 publication of the weekly newspaper, The Cambrian, commenced, the first newspaper to be published in Wales. The paper was controlled by Haynes and his son George until they sold their interest in it in 1822.

Haynes was a founder member of the Glamorgan Library (1804) and proprietor of the Cambrian Brewery (1805), where he had various partners from time to time including Henry Pocklington, his colleague in the bank. In 1810 he established a short-lived soap works on a site adjacent to the Cambrian Pottery, possibly in a fit of pique following his forced departure from the pottery. Following legal action on the part of Dillwyn on the grounds of the nuisance caused by its activities, it was forced to close almost immediately. Subsequently, in 1813/14 Haynes was instrumental in the establishment of the Glamorgan Pottery as a rival to the Cambrian Pottery and on an adjoining site, although he was never formally a partner in the concern.

== Later life ==
In about 1803 Haynes purchased the Ynystanglws estate at Clydach in the Swansea valley by the side of the Swansea Canal which he started to develop as a country seat. Following his withdrawal from the Cambrian Pottery in 1810 he used the capital so released to build a neo-Gothic-style house with a range of ancillary buildings, possibly designed by the Swansea architect William Jernegan.

Haynes's closing years were affected by the banking crisis of 1825. Following a run on the bank in December 1825 Haynes, Day, Haynes & Lawrence were forced into bankruptcy in January 1826 followed by the bank in Neath controlled by Haynes and his son, William Woodward Haynes. Over the following two years several sales of the property of Haynes and of his son William took place, including the brewery in Swansea and household furniture from his house at Clydach.

Haynes died at his home in Clydach on 2 January 1830. His contribution to the development of Swansea, and to all aspects of its social and economic life, at a time when the town was generally regarded as being the centre of polite society in south Wales and as one of the most important centres of industrial activity in the country, was considerable, although it has not been sufficiently recognised. A contribution of particular importance, but by no means the only one, was his development of the Pottery into what was for a time an establishment of national importance.
