= Thomas Baxter (painter) =

English painter

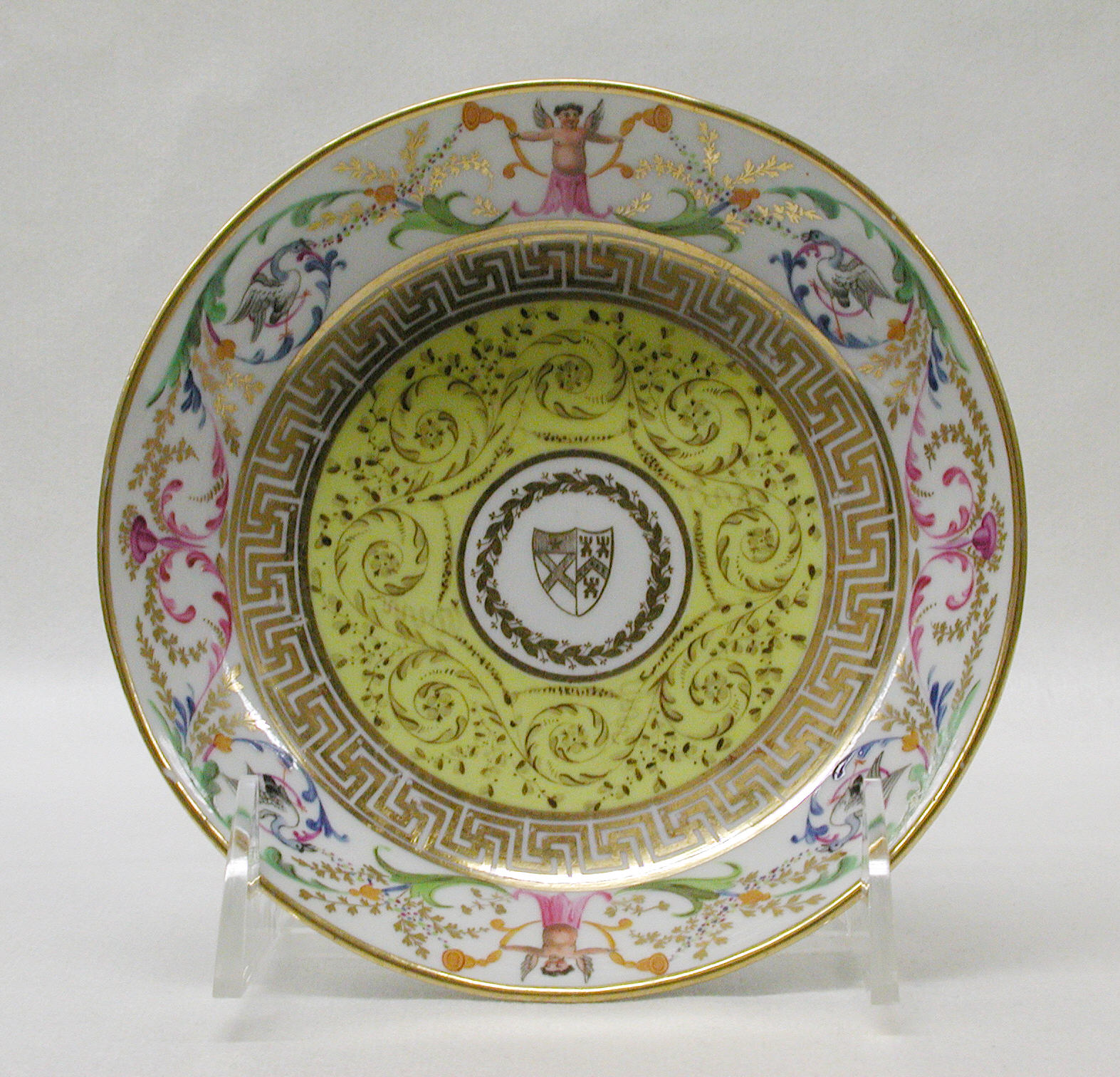
Worcester saucer (pair to next), c. 1807–10

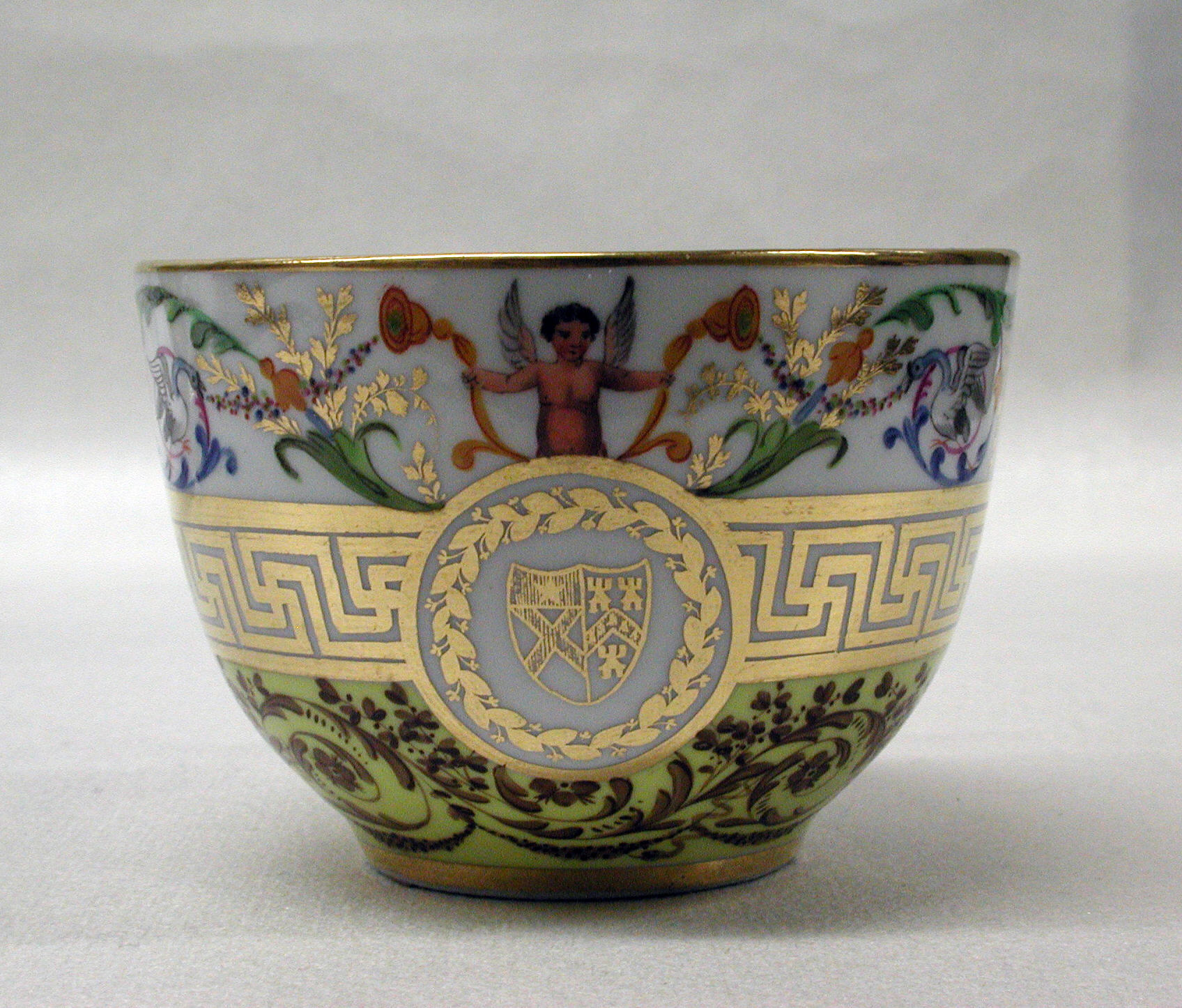
Worcester teacup (pair to last), c. 1807–10

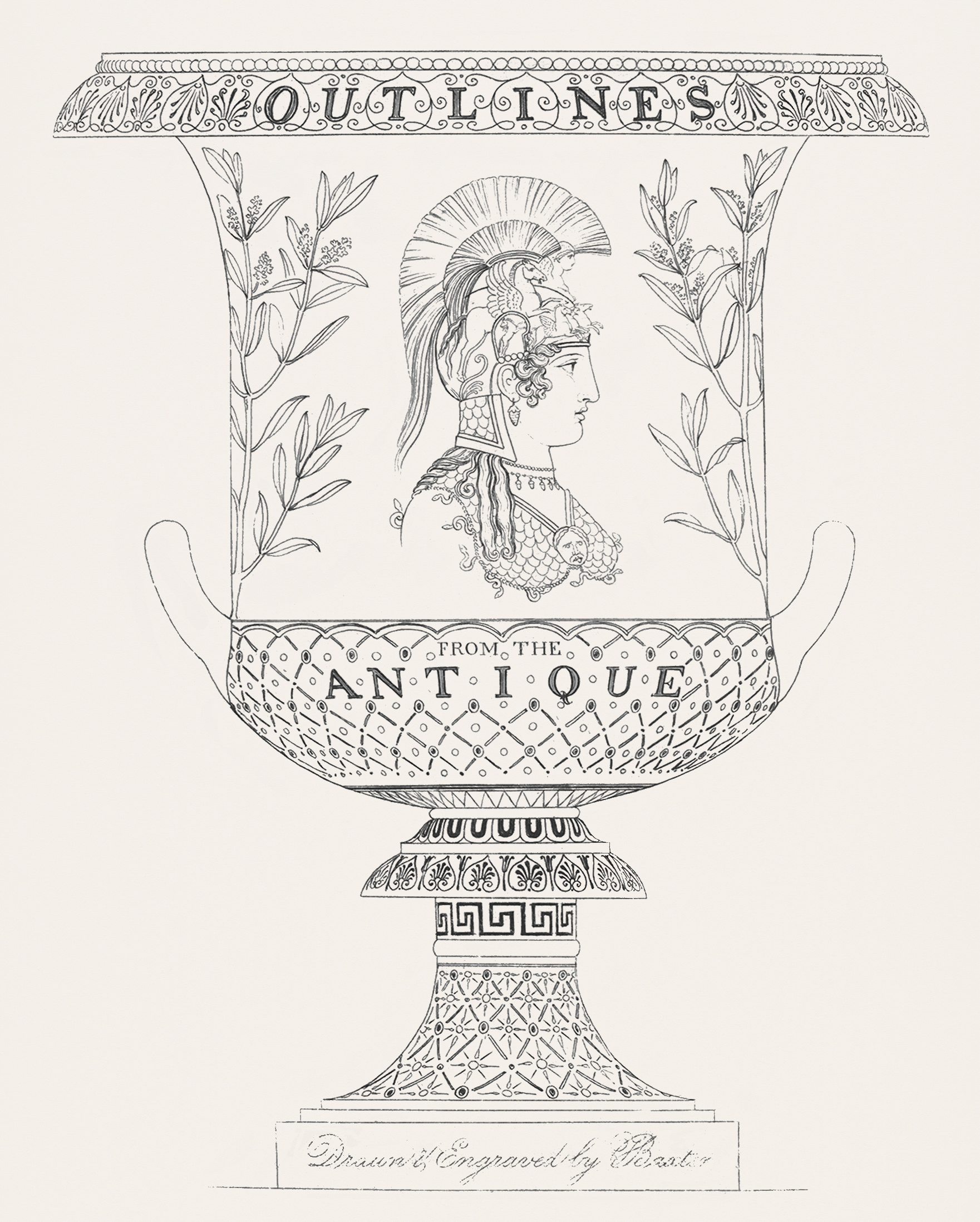
Illustration from An illustration of the Egyptian, Grecian and Roman Costumes

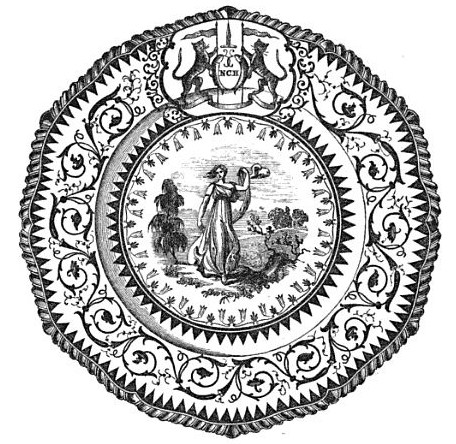
Royal Worcester plate with a central figure by Thomas Baxter

Thomas Baxter Jnr. (17 February 1782 – 18 April 1821) was an English porcelain painter, and a watercolour painter and illustrator.

== Life and work ==
Baxter (of whom an account is given in 'A Century of Potting in the City of Worcester' by R. W. Binns, 1877) was born in Worcester, the son of a china painter and gilder, who had workshops in London connected with the Worcester china works. Baxter received his first instruction in art from his father. He was a fellow student of Benjamin Haydon at the Royal Academy, as appears from a letter written by Baxter to Haydon in 1819. He was patronised by Lord Nelson, and was often employed by him in making sketches at his estate in Merton; He also painted for him a rich dessert service.

In his paintings upon china he introduced figures from the works of Reynolds, West and other well-known painters. In 1814 he left Worcester and established an art school in London, and had pupils who were afterwards distinguished in their special line. In 1816 he worked for the Cambrian Pottery at Swansea, and was there three years. His great work at that place was a "Shakespeare Cup" (from its description, remarkable more for ingenuity than for good taste). In 1819, he returned to Worcester, and was again employed at the Royal Porcelain Works (owned by Flight and Barr), and afterwards at Robert Chamberlain's factory. He was described as "the most accomplished artist who painted Worcester porcelain in the first half of the eighteenth century".

He also made drawing's for John Britton's book on Salisbury Cathedral, wrote and illustrated a book on ancient costume, and made two "very clever" copies of the 'Portland vase.'

Baxter died in London, 18 April 1821.
