= Nantgarw China Works =

Welsh ceramics company

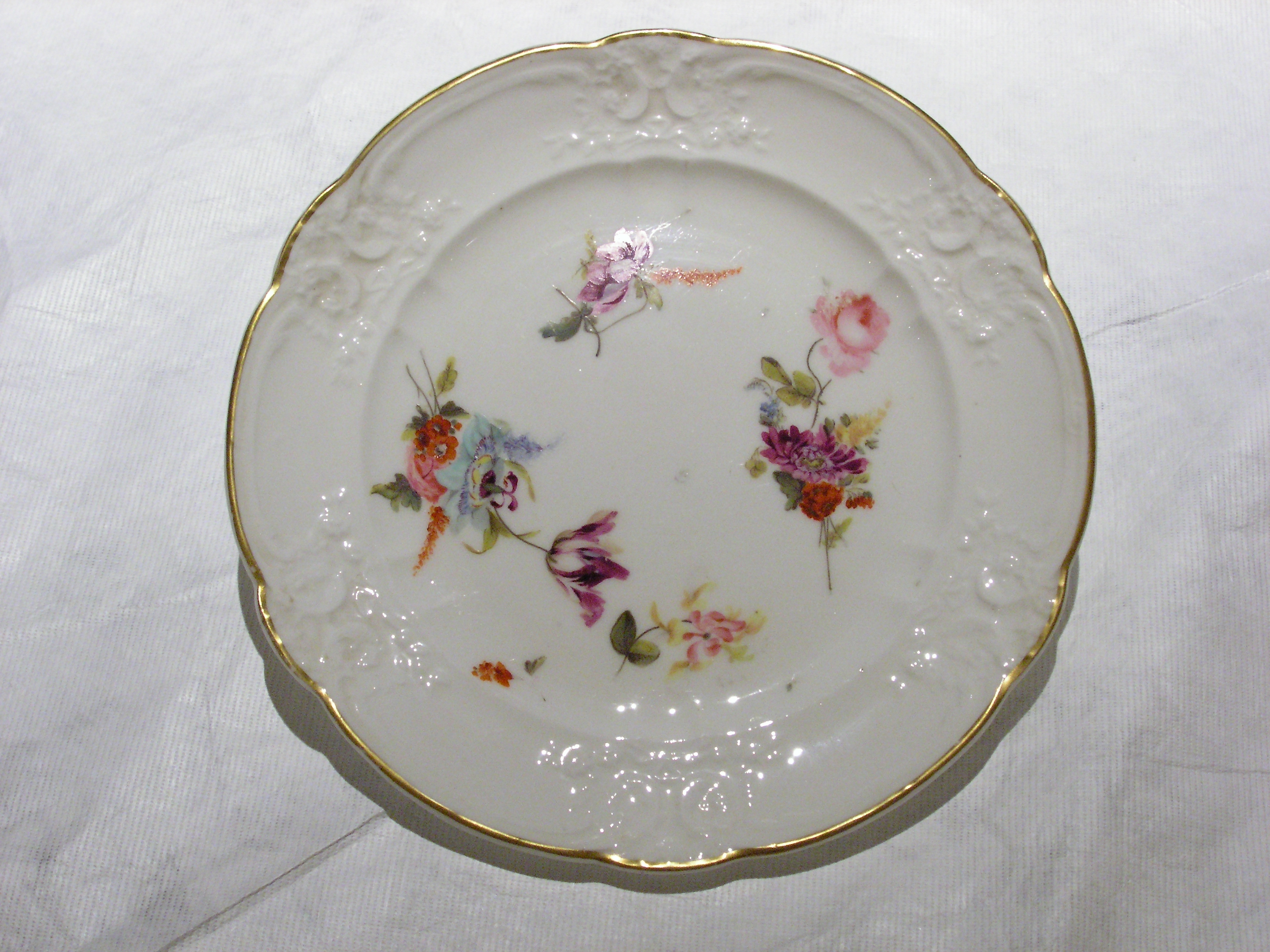
Nantgarw porcelain plate (c. 1813-1822)

The Nantgarw China Works was a porcelain factory, later making other types of pottery, located in Nantgarw on the eastern bank of the Glamorganshire Canal, 8 miles (13 km) north of Cardiff in the River Taff valley, Glamorganshire, Wales. The factory made porcelain of very high quality, especially in the years from 1813–1814 and 1817–1820. Porcelain produced by Nantgarw was extremely white and translucent, and was given overglaze decoration of high quality, mostly in London or elsewhere rather than at the factory. The wares were expensive, and mostly distributed through the London dealers. Plates were much the most common shapes made, and the decoration was typically of garlands of flowers in a profusion of colours, the speciality of the founder, William Billingsley. With Swansea porcelain, Nantgarw was one of the last factories to make soft-paste porcelain, when English factories had switched to bone china, and continental and Asian ones continued to make hard-paste porcelain.

The history of the ownership and management of the factory is complicated. The first formula, used in 1813–14, gave excellent results, but had an unacceptably high wastage rate, being very prone to deform ("slump") during firing. This formula was also being used at Swansea, and pieces can be impossible to allocate between the two with confidence. After a period of experimentation, in 1817-1820 the original paste formula was used again.

After ceasing to make or decorate porcelain in the 1820s, and a period of closure, the pottery reopened in 1833, making earthenware and stoneware, as well as clay pipes, before finally closing in 1920, when cigarettes had replaced pipes. The site is now a museum, and also a working pottery. In 2017 a limited quantity of porcelain was made there, using the original formula, as reconstructed.

== History ==
The "Nantgarw Works" in 1896 by Sir John Ballinger, depicting the Nantgarw Pottery and Glamorganshire Canal

Established in November 1813, when artist and potter William Billingsley and his son-in-law Samuel Walker, a skilled technician, rented "Nantgarw House" on the eastern bank of the Glamorganshire Canal, eight miles north of Cardiff in the Taff Valley, Glamorganshire, Wales, and set about building the kilns and ancillary equipment in its grounds, necessary to transform the building into a small porcelain pottery.

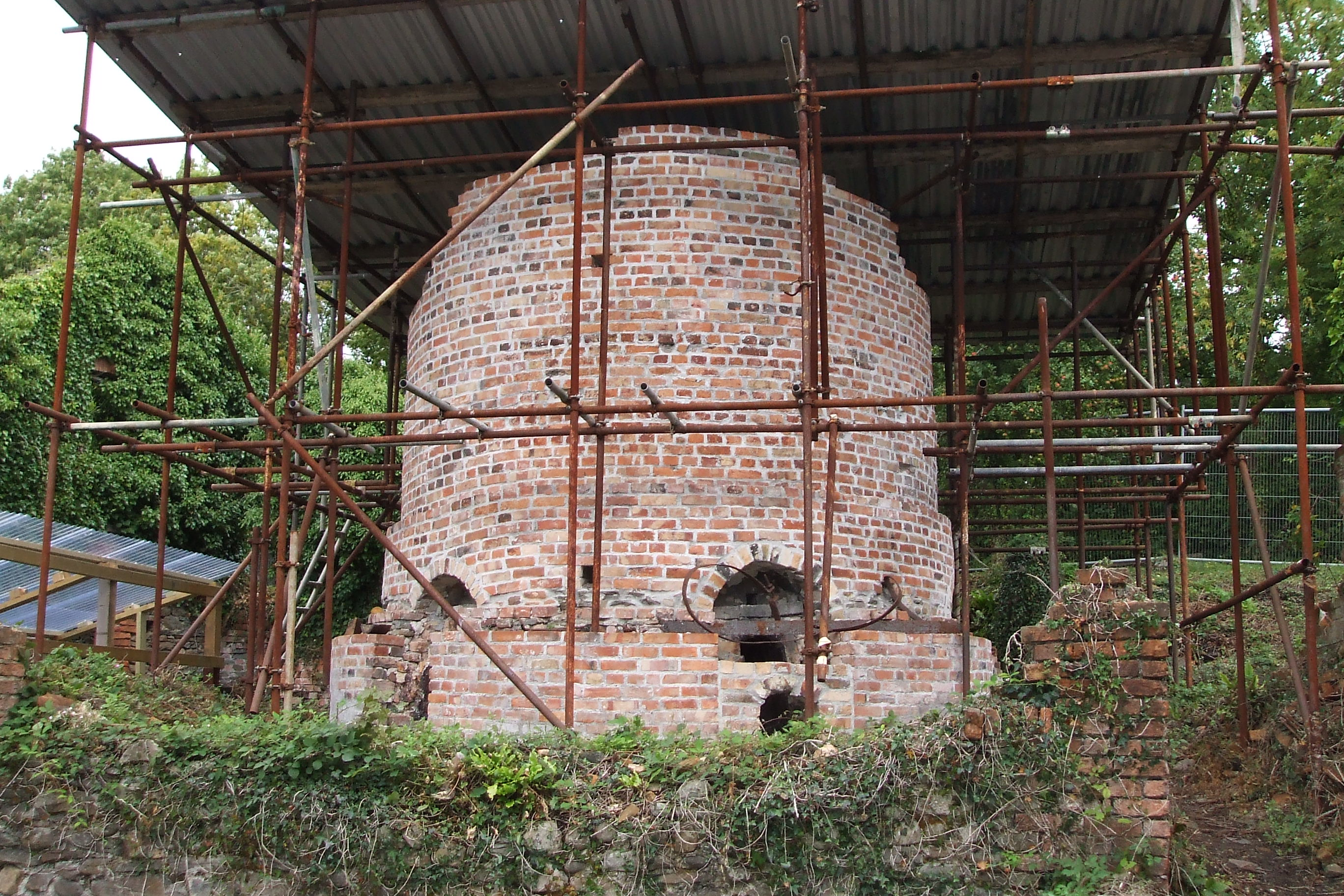
One of the kilns at the Nantgarw Pottery undergoing restoration in September 2006

Billingsley had been instrumental in the development of the porcelain recipe for Flight, Barr & Barr at Royal Worcester, he and Walker, had signed an agreement not to disclose their new porcelain recipe to a third party, but there was no clause preventing them from using that recipe themselves. They had left Worcester in secret and started the venture at Nantgarw with only £250 to invest in the project between them. By January 1814, the Quaker entrepreneur William Weston Young had already become the major share-holder in their venture, having invested £630 into the first production period at Nantgarw, as his diaries at the Glamorgan Record Office testify, where payments are recorded to a Mr "Bealey;" an alias Billingsley travelled under since leaving Royal Worcester.

It is assumed Young was acquainted with Billingsley through a mutual friend, and fellow earthenware decorator Thomas Pardoe, whom Billingsley had approached at Swansea's Cambrian Pottery, while seeking employment in 1807. Young's work across Glamorganshire as a surveyor may have put him in the position to advise Billingsley whilst still at Royal Worcester, of the suitability of the site at Nantgarw. Its proximity to the Glamorganshire Canal enabled heavy shipments of china clay, as well as the pottery's delicate porcelain wares to be smoothly transported to and from Cardiff docks by barges.

With the pottery established, Billingsley sought to produce a soft paste porcelain. Nantgarw porcelain was made to Billingsley's secret formula. Bones, burnt and mixed with clay, were ground by miller David Jones in a mill adjoining the Cross Keys public house, in the village. The water wheel was powered by a leat running from the canal to the River Taff. The high temperature needed to produce perfect pieces made Billingsley soft paste method difficult to fire. The vast majority of the pieces warped or shattered in the firing process. The resources of the three associates soon ran out and the group approached the British Government's Committee of Trade and Plantations (The Board of Trade), requesting a grant of £500, referring to the subsidy afforded to the famous Sèvres Porcelain Factory by the French Government. They were not successful, but one member of the committee, porcelain enthusiast Sir Joseph Banks, suggested his friend and potter Lewis Weston Dillwyn of the Cambrian Pottery of Swansea, Glamorganshire, should make an inspection and report on the matter.

Dillwyn made the inspection, observing that 90% of the porcelain was ruined in the firing, but was so impressed with the quality of the surviving pieces that he invited Billingsley and Walker to use his facilities at the Cambrian Pottery to improve their recipe and process. An annexe was built for porcelain production at the Cambrian Pottery, where Walker and Billingsley were based from late 1814. The recipe was modified and improved, but was still wasteful enough for Dillwyn to abandon the project in 1817, when the pair returned to Nantgarw. Royal Worcester's attempts to sue Dillwyn, Billingsley & Walker for breach of contract was a further reason for Dillwyn to cease porcelain production at the Cambrian Pottery. The contract signed at Royal Worcester prevented the recipe being disclosed to a third party, which superficially, Flight, Barr & Barr could not prove. However, when Dilwyn's notebooks were interred at the V&A Museum, South Kensington, London in 1920; Bilingsley's recipe was found, but had never used in Billingsley's absence.

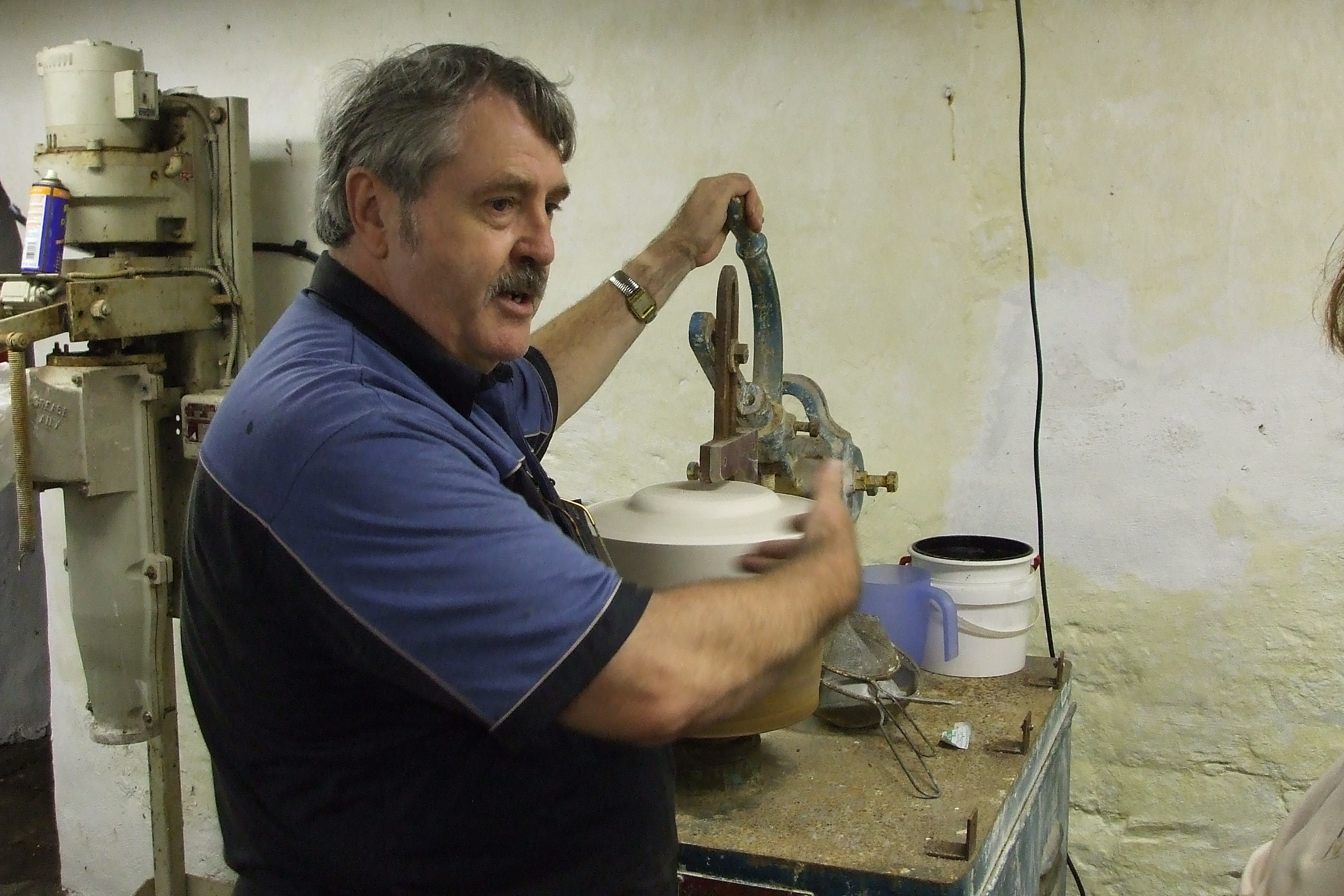
A jigger-and-jolley machine demonstrated by the curator of the Nantgarw pottery museum

In the second phase of production at Nantgarw, Young invested a further £1,100 in the pottery as well as mustering a further £1,000 from "ten gentlemen of the county". Billingsley and Walker continued to fire their porcelain, which by this stage was of the finest quality Billingsley had ever attained but still at a loss until one day in April 1820, while Young was away in Bristol, the pair absconded to Coalport leaving behind them the lease to the pottery and several thousand pieces of undecorated porcelain in various stages of production ("in the biscuit and the white").

Young put the Nantgarw Pottery and its contents up for sale via public auction in October 1820, enabling him to buy out his minor partners, become sole proprietor and manage the completion and sale of the stock; effectively salvaging the business. He invited his friend and former co-working artist from the Cambrian Pottery, Thomas Pardoe, to aid him with the completion and decoration of the salvaged porcelain. Young and Pardoe experimented to perfect a glaze for the biscuit ware, but were unable to add to Billingsley's stockpile of porcelain, having no access to his recipe. The final sales of the finished porcelain (sold between 1821 and 1822), paid Pardoe and his staff's salaries in arrears, but failed to recoup Young's total losses, leaving Young narrowly avoiding bankruptcy. Besides the porcelain decorated by Young, but predominantly by Pardoe at Nantgarw, many pieces were sold in the white to be decorated in London. These wares are known to have been decorated by Thomas Martin Randall (working for John Mortlock at the time), John Latham, William Peg and probably Matthew Colclough.

Some Nantgarw porcelain is identified with the mark "NANTGARW" impressed, often with the initials C.W. (for China Works) underneath. The word "NANTGARW" in red script is also seen on some of the finer specimens.

In 1833 William Henry Pardoe, son of Thomas Pardoe, took over the vacant Nantgarw Pottery and began manufacturing stoneware bottles and brown glazed earthenware known as Rockingham ware. He also began manufacturing clay tobacco pipes, many of which were exported to Ireland. The business continued under Pardoe's descendants, and at its peak produced around 10,000 pipes a week, until its closure in 1920, when cigarettes replaced such clay pipes.

== Collections ==
Collections of the historic wares can be seen at museums including the National Museum of Wales in Cardiff, the Oriel Plas Glyn-y-Weddw, Llanbedrog, Pwllheli, and the Victoria and Albert Museum in London.

== China Works Museum ==
In 1989 the semi-derelict site was bought by Taff-Ely County Borough Council, who still today own the site. After the start of archaeological excavation and restoration of its kilns and buildings, the site opened it to the public two years later as the Nantgarw China Works and Museum. Closed at the end of 2008 due to budget cuts at Rhondda Cynon Taff council, the Nantgarw Chinaworks Museum was reopened during the week in November 2010 by two artists. The museum is currently (February 2016) used for artists' studios, exhibitions, art classes and special events, and the restoration of the kilns is being completed by the Welsh government.
