= Ellen Shenton =

English sculptor

Ellen Shenton (c1828-1859) was an English sculptor who exhibited Byronic, biblical, and Shakespearian subjects at the Royal Academy in the 1850s.

Ellen Maria Nicholson Shenton was baptised in 1828, the daughter of Henry Shenton, an engraver, and the sister of Henry Chawner Shenton and William Kernot Shenton. All three children became sculptors whose work was exhibited at the Royal Academy. The family lived in Kentish Town, London, before moving to the Regent's Park area. She was active from 1850 until her death in 1859.

The London Evening Standard picked out her piece Medora for praise in their review of the 1851 Royal Academy show. Her statuette Parasina (1852) was described as having "elegance" in The Literary Gazette and Journal of the Belles Lettres, Arts, Sciences, &c. Her work The Greek mother, after having rescued her child from the eagle's nest, bearing it down on the rocks was described as "clever" by The Athenaeum, who also suggested her work over the preceding years was notable.

Her piece The Light of the Harem (1853) was chosen for the Exhibition of the Industry of All Nations in New York. It has been speculated that she contributed at least one figure for the Coalport porcelain manufactured by John Rose and Company.

== Selected works ==
- Medora (1850)
- Hagar and Ishmael (1851)
- Parasina (1852)
- Sybil (1852)
- The Greek mother, after having rescued her child from the eagle's nest, bearing it down on the rocks (1853)
- The Light of the Harem (1853)
- By the waters of Bablyon, we sat down and wept (1858)
- Cordelia (1859)
