= Cambrian Pottery =

Welsh pottery active 1764 to 1870

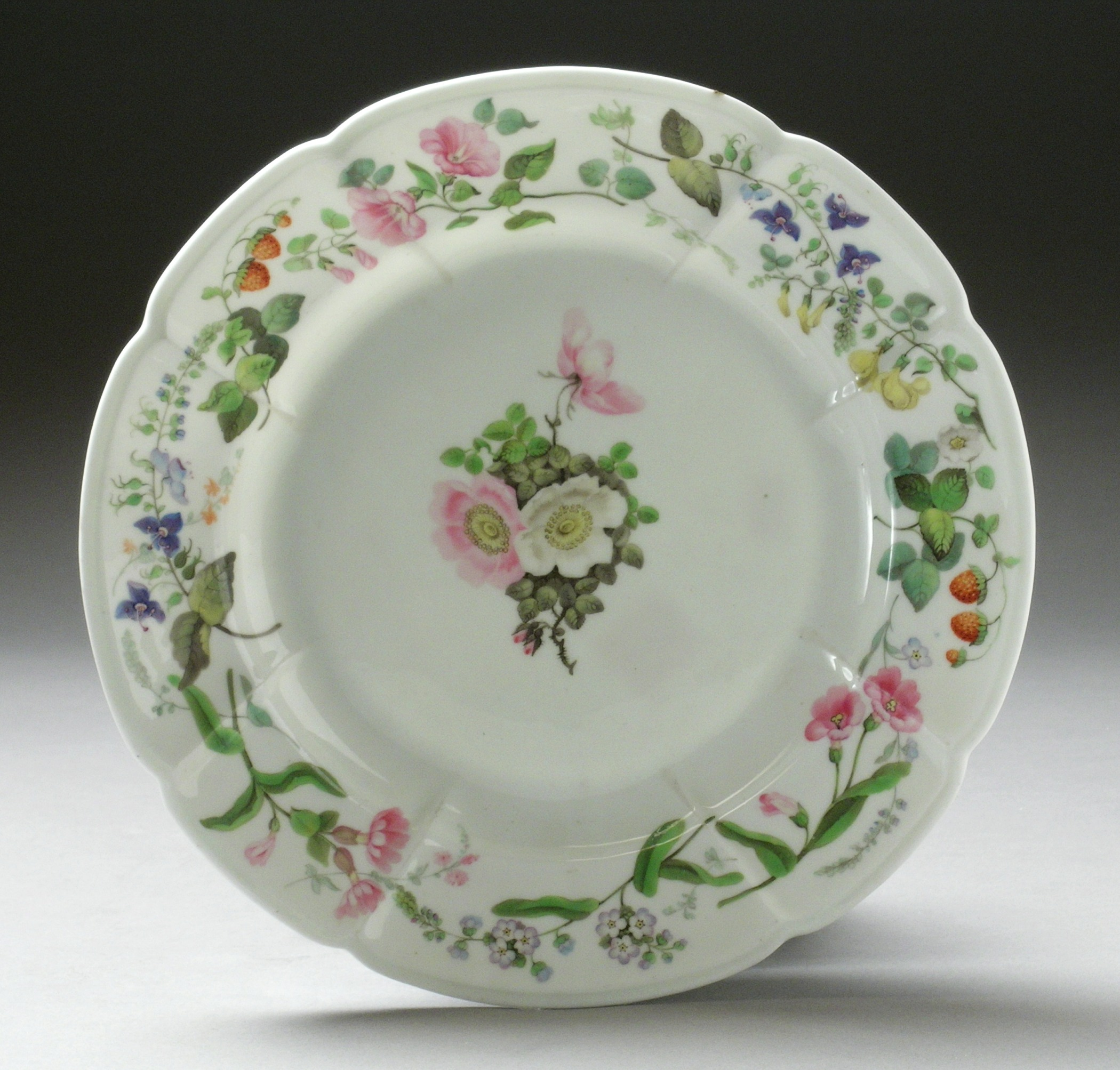
Swansea porcelain plate, from the Dynevor Service, c. 1817. Painting by William Pollard.

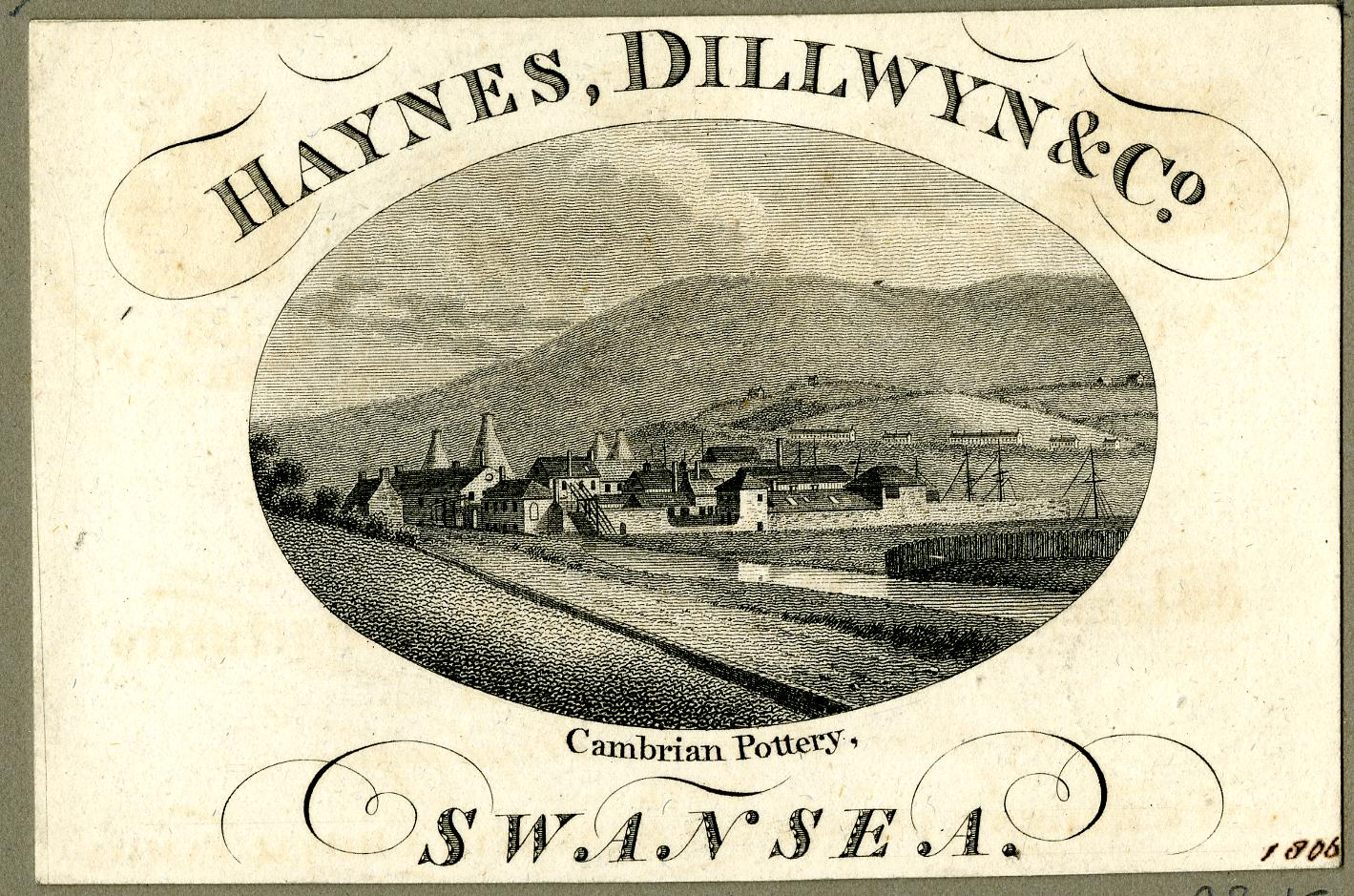
Trade-card, 1806

The Cambrian Pottery was founded in 1764 by William Coles in Swansea, Glamorganshire, Wales. In 1790, John Coles, son of the founder, went into partnership with George Haynes, who introduced new business strategies based on the ideas of Josiah Wedgwood. Lewis Weston Dillwyn became a partner in 1802 and sole owner when George Haynes left the pottery in 1810. In 1811 Dillwyn took T.& J. Bevington into partnership, the company becoming known as Dillwyn & Co.

Initially "its main product was coarse redware for farm and domestic use, though creamware and lead-glazed earthenware were also made". But Dillwyn, who also wrote naturalist books, was keen to move upmarket and employed the artist William Weston Young from 1806, and also Thomas Rothwell (1740-1807). Between 1814 and about 1822, the famous Swansea china or Swansea porcelain was made there.

== Porcelain ==
After William Billingsley, then owner of the Nantgarw porcelain factory, asked the Board of Trade for help, as he was not making a profit, the board asked Dillwyn, as a noted nearby pottery manager, to report on the matter. Dillwyn was so impressed with Billingsley's soft-paste porcelain product that he arranged with him to transfer production to the Cambrian Pottery, which began in 1814. However, Billingsley kept the secret of his recipe for the paste, which was of extremely high quality, especially for receiving painting, "highly translucent and of beautiful whiteness, but very liable to melt out of shape in the kiln" and so extremely expensive to make, as a high proportion of pieces were unsaleable, 90% according to many sources.

Initially most pieces were still marked "Nantgarw", leading to great uncertainty as to where pieces were made. In 1817 Billingsley and his son-in-law Samuel Walker returned to Nantgarw. Dillwyn devised a new paste recipe, initially using ground flint and a higher proportion of china clay. This is known as the "duck's egg" body and regarded by collectors as somewhat less fine than the original, but better than Dillwyn's next formula, containing steatite (soapstone). In 1817 Dillwyn leased the pottery to Bevington and Company, whose name is sometimes seen as a mark on the porcelain. This continued to be made until "1822 at latest", and the moulds were sold about 1823.

Floral painting, and often similar decoration in low relief, was the staple of the factory's output. The Cambrian employed some notable artists for its porcelain, such as Thomas Baxter, who moved to Swansea for three years from 1816, Thomas Pardoe, and William Pollard. Many of the wares were sent "outside" to London for decoration.

== Later history ==
Lewis Llewelyn Dillwyn (Lewis Weston Dillwyn's son) ran the pottery from 1836. He bought out the neighbouring Glamorgan Pottery in 1838. Many of the redundant staff went on to help found the South Wales Pottery at Llanelli, the competition from which, played a part in the ultimate demise of the Cambrian Pottery in 1870.

The pottery closed in 1870, when the site was sold to Cory, Yeo & Co.

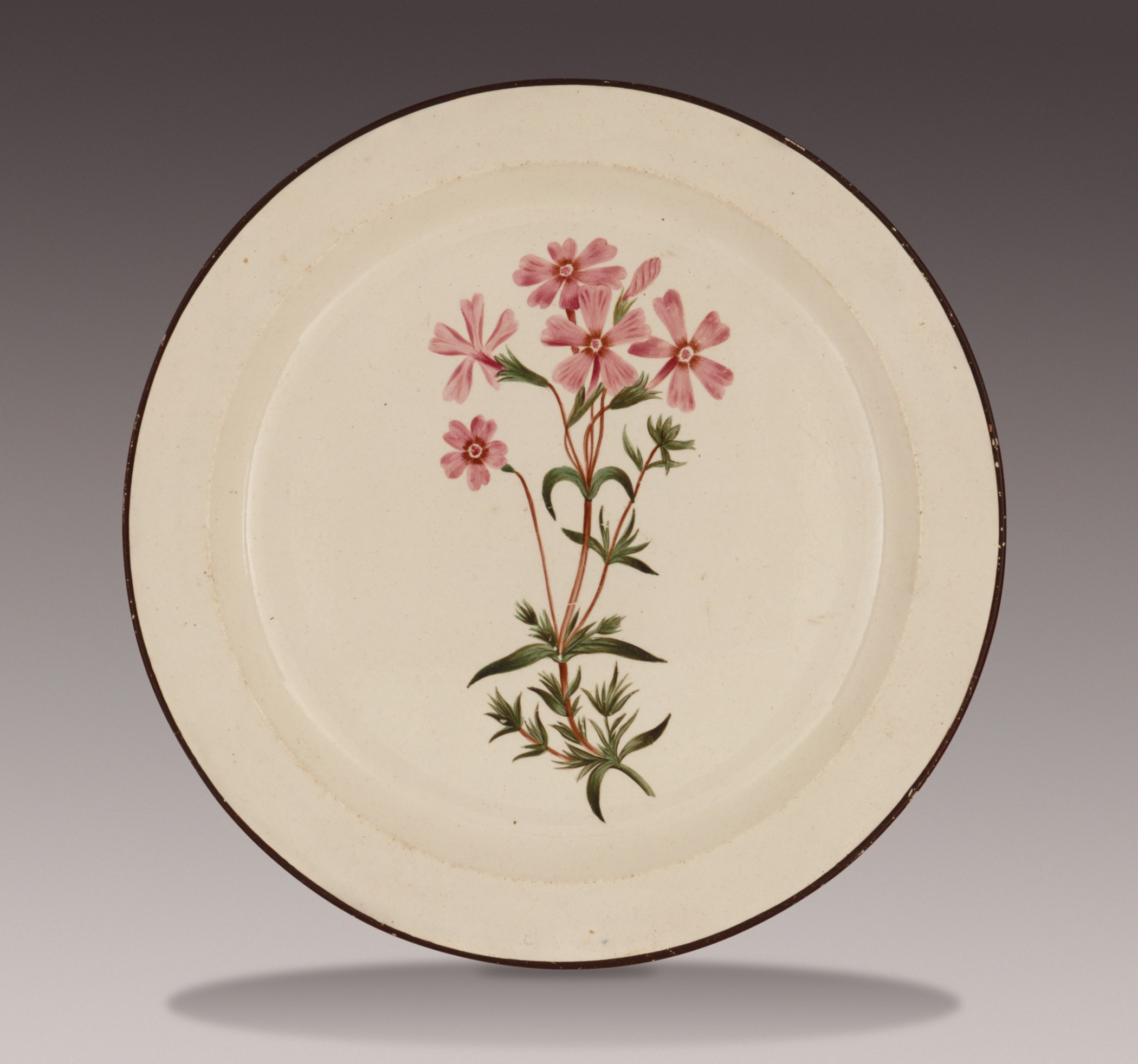
Plate, painting attributed to Thomas Pardoe (1770-1823), pearlware, c. 1810

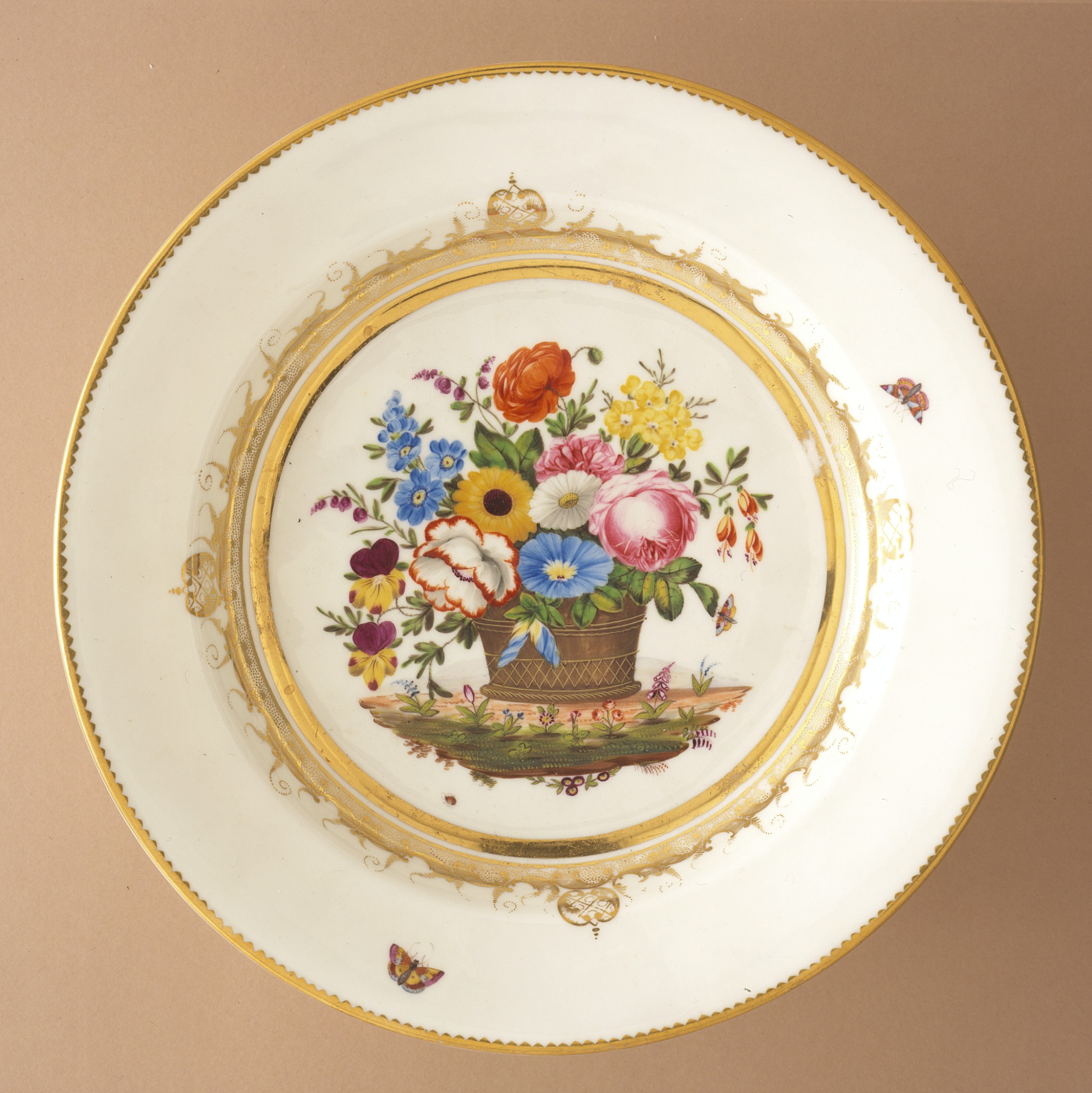
Porcelain soup plate from the Burdette-Coutts Service, c. 1815

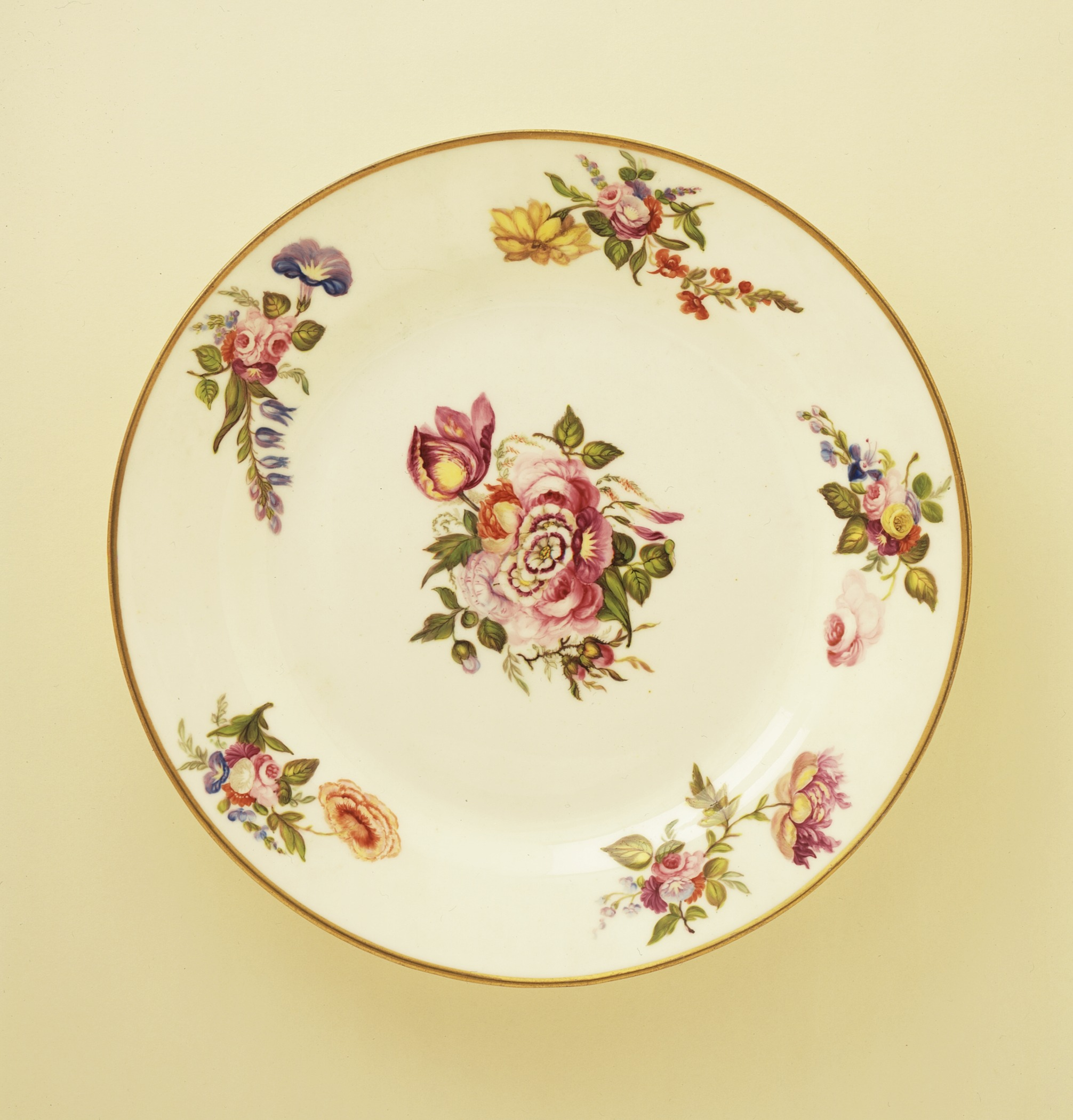
Porcelain plate painted by William Pollard, c. 1817

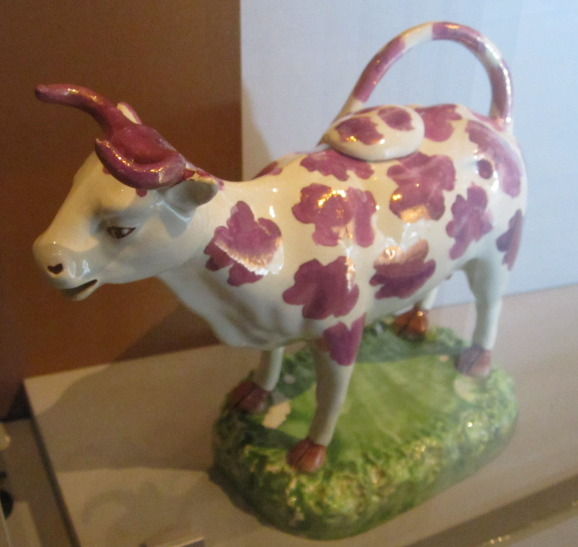
Earthenware cow creamer, 1820–40, "possibly Cambrian Pottery"
