= Nantgarw =

Coordinates: 51.564623°N 3.267032°W

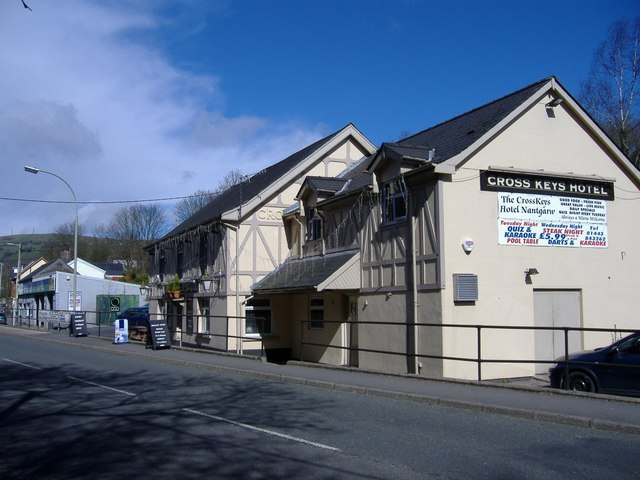

- Location within Rhondda Cynon Taf
- OS grid reference: ST122858
- Principal area: Rhondda Cynon Taf
- Preserved county: Mid Glamorgan
- Country: Wales
- Sovereign state: United Kingdom
- Post town: CARDIFF
- Postcode district: CF15
- Dialling code: 01443
- Police: South Wales
- Fire: South Wales
- Ambulance: Welsh
- UK Parliament: Pontypridd
- Senedd Cymru – Welsh Parliament: Pontypridd

Nantgarw is a village in the county borough of Rhondda Cynon Taf, Wales, near Cardiff.

Nantgarw is within the electoral and administrative ward of Taff's Well, a village some 2.5 miles (4 km) south, but historically fell within the boundaries of Caerphilly, which is a major town located less than 2.5 miles (4 km) to the east.

The original village was almost entirely destroyed by the development of the A470 trunk road, which was situated at the location of the current A468 junction. Located close to the A470, Nantgarw is within easy reach of the town of Pontypridd (5.5 miles (9 km) to the northwest) and Cardiff City centre (around 7.5 miles (12 km) further south). Nantgarw is the home of the Nantgarw tradition of folk dancing.

== History ==
The "Nantgarw Works" in 1896 by Sir John Ballinger, depicting the Nantgarw Pottery and Glamorganshire Canal

Nantgarw lies on the River Taff. It is known for its porcelain, produced in between 1813 and 1814, and later between 1817 and 1820 at the Nantgarw Pottery, commemorated at the Nantgarw Chinaworks Museum. The potter and painter William Billingsley is credited with starting the porcelain trade here.

After the building of the Glamorganshire Canal, the 1841 census showed that of the 300 residents, about 60 owed their living to work associated directly with the canal. But the development of drift mines and the development of the Taff Vale Railway, meant that by 1875 the majority of the villages residents were colliers.

The development of the village stopped until the 1910 development of the Nantgarw Colliery, but various geographical problems resulted in a series of stalled developments of the colliery until post World War II, when new workings and a coking coal plant were developed by 1951. A new village settlement was then built on the hillside behind the colliery.

Nantgarw was formerly served by two railway stations: Nantgarw (High Level) Halt on the Pontypridd, Caerphilly and Newport Railway, which opened in 1904, and Nantgarw (Low Level) Halt on the Cardiff Railway, which opened in 1911. The Low Level station did not last long after the Railways Act 1921, and closed in 1931 (though the line continued to serve Nantgarw Colliery until the late 1980s. The High Level station closed in 1956.

== Nantgarw Colliery ==
Craig Yr Allt Colliery was situated south of Nantgarw village. However, whenever the Taff River flooded, water frequently entered its workings, and it was abandoned in 1878.

Thomas Taylor of Pontypridd began the development of Nantgarw colliery in May 1910, near the base of the Caerphilly Syncline seam. The sinking of the twin shafts in 1911 reached the coal seam at a depth of more than 850 yards in 1915, placing them 2000 ft below sea level and making Nantgarw the deepest pit to be sunk in the South Wales Coalfield up to that time.

Having suffered from various geographical issues, Powell Duffryn designed a development scheme in 1937, but work was suspended when World War II broke out in 1939. A later project to re-open the colliery was approved by the Ministry of Fuel and Power in 1946, and after nationalisation in 1947, the National Coal Board invested £5 million on modern surface constructions and modern mining methods. Having survived the mass pit closures of the 1960s, the geographical problems meant the closure of the mine working in 1974, and the unit merged with Windsor Colliery, Abertridwr, Caerphilly from 1975. By 1979, the combined Nantgarw/Windsor Colliery employed around 650 men, producing over 4,000 tons of coal per week, making a profit of over £0.5 million.

The unit lost £7 million in 1981, employing: 142 on development; 131 on the coalface; 197 below the ground; 101 on the surface. In 1982 output declined steeply as a major coal seam at Windsor became unworkable, while in 1984 an overtime ban led directly to the 1984/5 UK miners strike spreading to South Wales. Although profitable post the strike, both sites of the whole unit closed as part of the NCB regional review on 6 November 1986.

== Village today ==
The village declined after the 1969 construction of the A470, which destroyed most of the historic old village. The only original buildings that remain are Nantgarw Pottery and a handful of houses in close proximity. After the closure of the Nantgarw/Windsor Colliery and Coking works 18 months after the miners' strike, the site was developed as Parc Nantgarw, joined to the larger Trefforest Industrial Estate. All that now remains of Nantgarw colliery are two small concrete pyramids marking the sites of the two shafts and a commemorative winding wheel.

Parc Nantgarw is home to the headquarters of Cadw (the Welsh equivalent of English Heritage), and a large office for the newly relocated Santia Consulting. The social side of the estate provides a cinema, indoor 10 pin bowling and various restaurants.

GE Aviation Wales, located on the Caerphilly Road, employs about 1500 people in the testing, repair and maintenance of aircraft engines, including GE90, GP7200, CFM56 and RB211.

Coleg y Cymoedd is a further education college for adult learners. The college has a campus in Nantgarw.

=== Nantgarw Infants School ===
Opened on 11 March 1907 with 55 children, it was destroyed by fire in April 1933. The school moved to Wheeler's Billiard Hall, the school was reopened on 2 September 1935. An extension providing interior toilets, a small kitchen and an office for the head teacher was built in 1979. The school is now closed.
