= Glamorgan Pottery =

The Glamorgan Pottery was situated on the banks of the River Tawe, Swansea, Wales, from 1814 until 1838, producing various earthenware products. It is not to be confused with the Cambrian Pottery, also of Swansea, which made fine porcelain, also from 1814, usually known as "Swansea porcelain".

Its founder, George Haynes and previous manager of the adjacent Cambrian Pottery, opened the works in 1814, having fallen out with Cambrian owner Lewis Weston Dillwyn. The wares produced were largely for domestic use, and often marked "B B & I", for Baker, Bevans and Irwin, the initials of the proprietors.

The pottery was Offered for sale and purchased in 1838 by Lewis Llewelyn Dillwyn, son of Lewis Weston Dillwyn. He closed the pottery in 1838, selling most of the assets to William Chambers (industrialist), who then established the South Wales Pottery at Llanelly in 1840. Many of the workers, most originally from Staffordshire, transferred to the new pottery.

Examples of both Glamorgan pottery and Cambrian pottery can be seen today at Swansea Museum, Victoria Street, the Glynn Vivian Gallery, Swansea, and the National Museum of Wales, Cardiff
