= James Hadley =

James Hadley may refer to:

- James Hadley (scholar) (1821–1872), American scholar
- James Hadley (potter) (1837–1903), English potter
- Jack Hadley (James Roosevelt Hadley, born 1936), American curator
- Jim Hadley (1893–1971), Australian politician
- James Hadley (1989), American Scholar

== See also ==
- James Hadley Billington, American academic
- James Hadley Chase (1906–1985), English writer
