= Henry Sandon =

British antiques expert (1928–2023)

Henry Sandon MBE
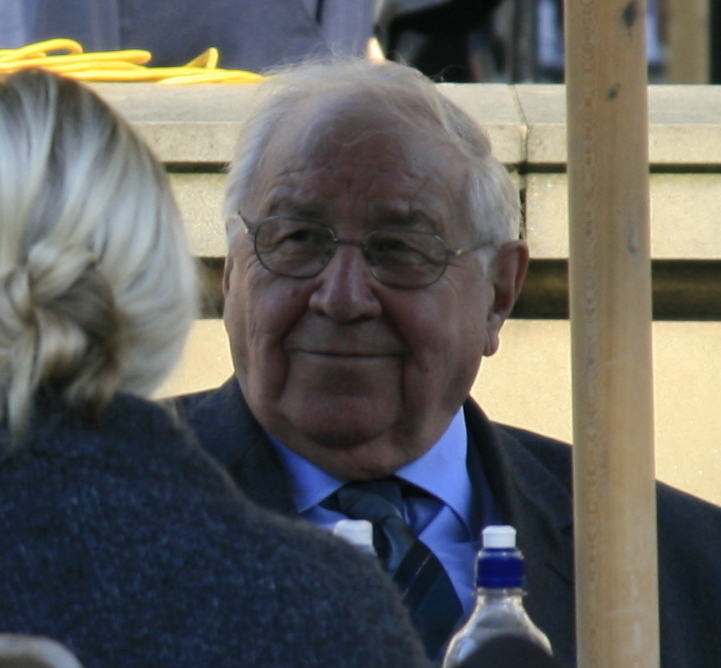
- Sandon in 2010
- Born: Henry George Sandon; 10 August 1928; London, England
- Died: 25 December 2023 (aged 95); Malvern, England
- Education: Royal Grammar School, High Wycombe
- Occupations: Antique expert; television personality; author; lecturer
- Known for: Authority on Royal Worcester porcelain
- Television: Antiques Roadshow
- Spouse: Barbara Starkey (m. 1956; died 2013)
- Children: 3, including John

Henry George Sandon MBE (10 August 1928 – 25 December 2023) was an English antiques expert, television personality, author and lecturer who specialised in ceramics and was a notable authority on Royal Worcester porcelain. He was the curator of the Dyson Perrins Museum for many years.

== Early life ==
Sandon was born as Henry George Sandoni on 10 August 1928 in the East End of London when his family lived at 2, Bedford Street (now Cavell Street), Whitechapel. He was the son of Italian-born Augusto Sandoni (born 21 March 1891 Castelfranco dell'Emilia, Modena, Emilia-Romagna), and his English wife Clara (née Mellish) from Marylebone. Due to his waiter father's later work as a dog trainer for films, he had an early career as a child actor in silent films, with a leading role in The Cockney Kid. Sandon was evacuated to Buckinghamshire during the Second World War and finished his schooling at the Royal Grammar School, High Wycombe. He then studied at the Guildhall School of Music and became a singer and music teacher at the Royal Grammar School Worcester and a lay clerk in the Worcester Cathedral Choir.

== Career ==
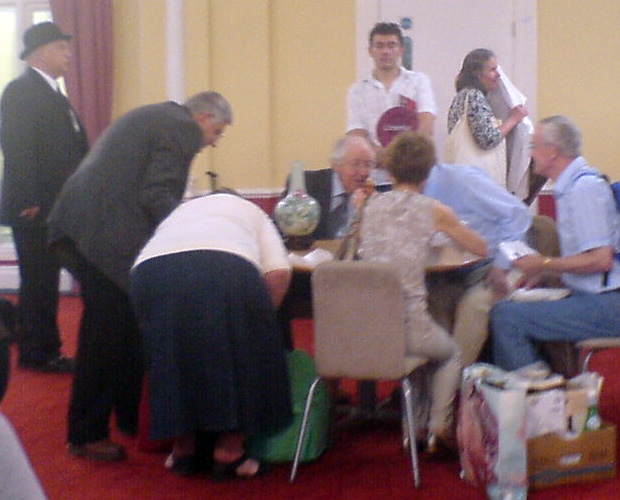
Sandon (seated centre) examining porcelain on the Antiques Roadshow

He began his career as an archaeologist and became interested in the history of ceramics after discovering Roman pots in his garden in Worcester. During the 1950s, he collected ceramic art from buildings in Worcester that were being demolished. He was appointed curator of the Dyson Perrins Museum at the Royal Worcester factory in 1966 and held that position until 1982. He was described as "the world's leading authority on Worcester porcelain."

Sandon joined BBC One's Antiques Roadshow for its second series in 1979 and made many appearances on the programme across 40 years. On a 1990 show he valued a Staffordshire slipware jug, later dubbed "Ozzy the Owl", at £20,000 to £30,000. It was subsequently acquired by Potteries Museum & Art Gallery. One of his projects was an excavation at the Royal Worcester factory site. He was also a former curator of the Gardiner Museum in Toronto.

On 3 April 2002 Sandon was the subject of Thames Television's This is Your Life with Michael Aspel.

== Personal life and death ==
Sandon was married to Barbara Starkey for 56 years, before her death in 2013. They had three sons together, including John Sandon, also a well-known antiques expert and television personality.

Sandon died from a stroke at a care home in Malvern, Worcestershire, on 25 December 2023, at the age of 95. Following his death, the Museum of Royal Worcester wrote "It is with great sadness we share the news that Henry Sandon passed away on Christmas morning. Our curator and then patron of the Museum for many years, a much-loved expert who shared his knowledge and enthusiasm for pots and Worcester in person, in books & on tv. Sorely missed."

The episode of Antiques Roadshow broadcast on 14 January 2024 included a short tribute to Sandon.

== Honours ==
In 2000, he was voted Antiques Personality of the Year by the readers of BBC's Homes & Antiques magazine. He was appointed Member of the Order of the British Empire (MBE) in the 2008 Queen's Birthday Honours for his services to broadcasting, the ceramics industry, and to charity.

The Henry Sandon Hall at the Royal Porcelain works in Worcester is named in his honour. He opened the centre for the arts in 2018.

== Selected publications ==
- British Pottery and Porcelain for Pleasure and Investment. London: John Gifford Ltd. 1969. ISBN 978-0707102917.
- The Illustrated Guide to Worcester Porcelain 1751 – 1793. London: Barrie & Jenkins. 1980 [1969]. ISBN 978-0091421106.
- Coffee Pots and Teapots for the Collector. New York: HarperCollins. 1974. ISBN 978-0668033374.
- Royal Worcester Porcelain 1862 to the Present Day (2nd ed.). London/ New York: Barrie & Jenkins / Clarkson N. Potter. 1975 [1973]. ISBN 978-0214201066.
- Living with the Past. London: Hodder & Stoughton. 1997. ISBN 978-0340694268.
- Flight and Barr Worcester Porcelain 1783-1840. ACC Art Books. 1999 [1978]. ISBN 978-0902028753.
- The Sandon Guide to Royal Worcester Figures, 1900-1970 by David Sandon, Henry Sandon, and John Sandon (1986)
- Miniature Baptismal Fonts by Henry Sandon and Julian Wheeler (2016)
- Dictionary Worcester Porcelain, 1852-1952 by Henry Sandon (1995)
- Landscapes on Derby and Worcester Porcelain by Henry Sandon and John Twitchet (1984)
- Worcester Porcelain-Seventeen Fifty-One to Seventeen Ninety-Three by Henry Sandon (1983)
- Grainger's Worcester porcelain by Henry Sandon (1989)

== See also ==
- List of antiques experts
