= History of Worcester =

Aspect of English history

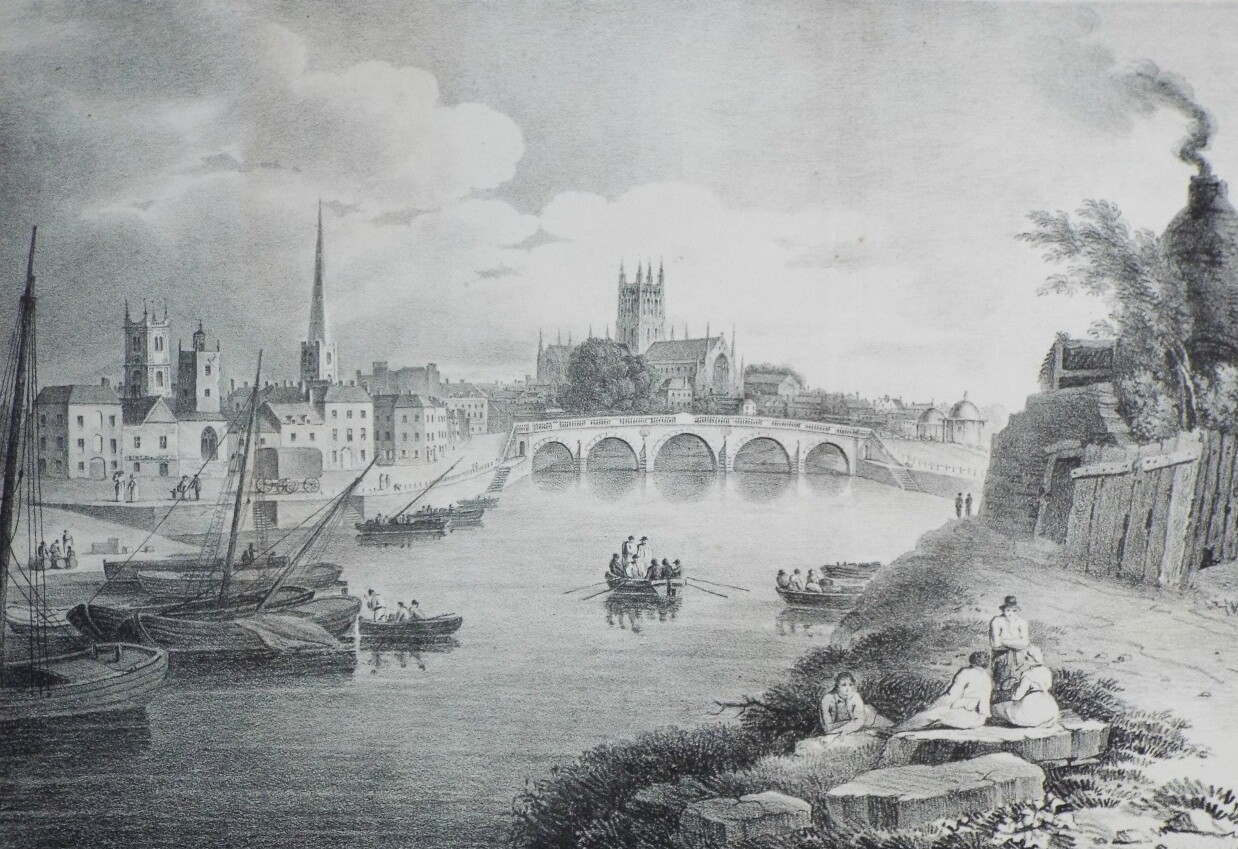
View of Worcester looking south along River Severn, 1750

Worcester's early importance is partly due to its position on trade routes, but also because it was a centre of Church learning and wealth, due to the very large possessions of the See and Priory accumulated in the Anglo-Saxon period. After the reformation, Worcester continued as a centre of learning, with two early grammar schools with strong links to Oxford University.

The city was often important for strategic military reasons, being close to Gloucester and Oxford as well as Wales, which led to a number of attacks and sieges in the conflicts of the early medieval period. For similar reasons, it was valuable to the crown during the English Civil War.

The city was a centre of the cloth trade, and later of glove production. It had a number of foundries and made machine tools for the car industry. In politics, Worcester often lagged behind other similar cities in municipal reform, and in the nineteenth and start of the twentieth century, retained corrupt electoral practices in Westminster elections long after gifts and bribes had been made unlawful.

== Early history ==
The trade route which ran past Worcester, later forming part of the Roman Ryknild Street, dates to Neolithic times. The position commanded a ford over the River Severn (the river was tidal past Worcester prior to public works projects in the 1840s) and was fortified by the Britons around 400 BC. It would have been on the northern border of the Dobunni and probably subject to the larger communities of the Malvern hillforts.

== Romano-British ==
During the Roman period Worcester emerged as an important settlement on the River Severn, connected by river to the forts at Gloucester and Wroxeter and by road to the small towns and industrial centres of Alcester, Droitwich, and Kenchester. Finds of coins and military equipment suggest that the site originated as a fort in the Julio-Claudian or Neronian period, which may have been located on or near the site of the medieval cathedral. By the late 1st century the settlement developed into a small town, which may have been called 'Vertis', a name first mentioned in the 7th-century Ravenna Cosmography. The small town at Worcester can probably be identified with 'Cair Guiragon', which is listed among the 28 Cities of Britain in the History of the Britons attributed to Nennius.

The core of the Roman settlement lay on the high ground around Worcester Cathedral, and was surrounded by a large earthwork rampart and ditch, which was first identified in the 1950s at Little Fish Street. Traces of the east side of the ditch were recorded along Lich Street by Philip Barker, and probably continued as far as the southern end of the medieval castle bailey, enclosing an area of c.10 ha. The rampart had at least two gates on its north and east sides, although their exact locations have not been confirmed by excavation. Extramural settlement has been identified during excavations at Castle Street, Deansway, and Sidbury, and is thought to represent the city's northern and eastern suburbs. The full extent of the Roman small town was much larger than the later medieval city, and probably covered an area of c.70-95 ha or more.

While most buildings in the Roman small town were made of timber, the presence of more substantial romanised buildings are indicated by finds of tesserae, flue tiles, painted wall plaster, and architectural stonework, including the remains of a limestone column found at The Butts.

Roman Worcester was a significant industrial centre, and played a key role in the early West Midlands iron industry. The ore smelted at Worcester was probably shipped up the River Severn from the Forest of Dean, where extraction took place between the late 1st and mid-4th centuries. Glass was also produced in Worcester during the 3rd century. The small town was an important distribution centre for goods produced elsewhere, including salt from Droitwich and cattle from the Lake District, Wales, and Northern Scotland.

Most of the inhabitants of Roman Worcester were pagans, and the worship of Vulcan and Venus is suggested by excavated finds from Blackfriars, Castle Street, and The Hive. The discovery of a 4th-century bronze 'Chi-Rho' at Lychgate may reflect a Christian presence in the late Roman period. The two medieval churches of St Alban's and St Helen's, both of which are sited on the edge of Worcester's Roman rampart, have unusual dedications to early Christian saints, and could have originated in the late Roman or early post-Roman periods.

== The Anglo-Saxons ==
The settlement was eventually subsumed by the emerging Kingdom of Mercia. In 680, Worcester was chosen—in preference to both the much larger Gloucester and the royal court at Winchcombe—to be the seat of a new bishopric. This site of the new St Peter's was probably chosen due to the presence of Roman-era fortifications; many Roman sites were reused in this period by church communities, because of their perceived prestige.

It is likely that there was Christian occupation within the city defences at the Church of St Helen, which was likely British, serving a sizeable parish. Two further churches were established by 800, St Margaret's and St Alban's. Between the four religious communities, along with people supplying the basics needed for everyday life, a considerable number of people would have lived in the settlement. Nevertheless, the site was an essentially private settlement. Worcester appears frequently in the historic records prior to the Viking era, often with reference to the church and monastic communities, and showing evidence of extensive ecclesiastical ownership of lands. In this early phase, the Bishop was already a powerful figure, collecting considerable dues from lands and properties owned, including the Droitwich saltworks.

The city became a public settlement during King Alfred's reign, when it was chosen to be the site of a 'burh', or fortified town, as part of efforts to create a network of defensible sites able to resist Viking invasions. The earls of Mercia fortified Worcester "for the protection of all the people" at the request of Bishop Werfrith. It appears that maintenance of the defences was to be paid for by the townspeople. A unique document detailing this and privileges granted to the church also outlines the existence of Worcester's market and borough court, differentiation between church and market quarters within the city, as well as the role of the King in relation to the roads.

Worcester's fortifications would most likely have established the line of the wall that was extant until the 1600s, perhaps excepting the south east area near the former castle. It is referred to as a wall by contemporaries, so may have been of stone.

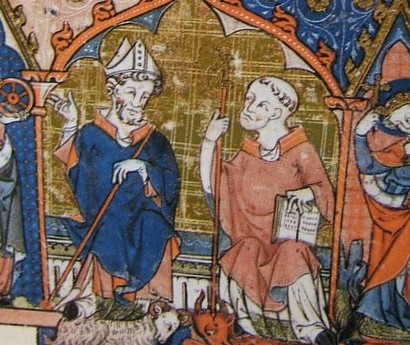
Oswald and Eadnoth, from a late 13th to early 14th century psalter

Worcester in the years before the first millennium was a centre of monastic learning and church power. Oswald of Worcester was an important reformer, appointed Bishop in 961, jointly with York. The last Anglo-Saxon Bishop of Worcester, Wulfstan, or St Wulstan, was also an important reformer, and stayed in post until his death in 1095.

Worcester became the focus of tax resistance against the Danish Harthacanute. Two huscarls were killed in May 1041 while attempting to collect taxes for the expanded navy, after being driven into the Priory, where they were murdered. A military force was sent to deal with the non-payment, while the townspeople attempted to defend themselves by moving to and occupying the island of Bevere, two miles up river, where they were then besieged. After Harthacnut's men had sacked the city and set it alight, agreement was reached.

By the 970s a mint had been established at Worcester, with at least 12 moneyers recorded in the reign of Edward the Confessor. Many of the city's moneyers traded as goldsmiths, and leased property from the monks of cathedral priory.

== Medieval ==
=== Early medieval ===
Worcester was, for tax purposes, counted within Worcestershire's rural administration units (known as Hundreds) at the start of the Norman period. It was administratively independent.

The first Norman Sheriff of Worcestershire, Urse d'Abetot oversaw the construction of a new castle at Worcester, although nothing now remains of the castle. Worcester Castle was in place by 1069, its outer bailey built on land that had previously been the cemetery for the monks of the Worcester cathedral chapter. The motte of the castle overlooked the river, just south of the cathedral.

Worcester's growth and position as a market town distributing goods and produce came from its river crossing and bridge, and its position on the road network. In the 14th century, the nearest bridges over the Severn were at Gloucester and Bridgnorth. The main road from London to mid-Wales ran through Worcester. The road north west ran to Kidderminster, Bridgnorth and Shrewsbury; and the road north through Bromsgrove connected to Coventry, and towards Derby. The road southward connected to Tewkesbury and Gloucester.

There had been a bridge in Worcester since at least the 11th century; it was replaced in the early 14th century. This bridge, situated below the current Newport Street, had six arches on piers with starlings, and the middle pier had a gatehouse.

The city walls' upkeep was paid for by the residents. The walls included bastions and a watercourse. The course of the wall was fairly irregular. The entrances to the city were through defensive gates, constructed at different times, including St. Martin's Gate in the east, Sidbury Gate to the south, Friar Gate, Edgar Tower and Water Gate; there were six gates by the 16th century.

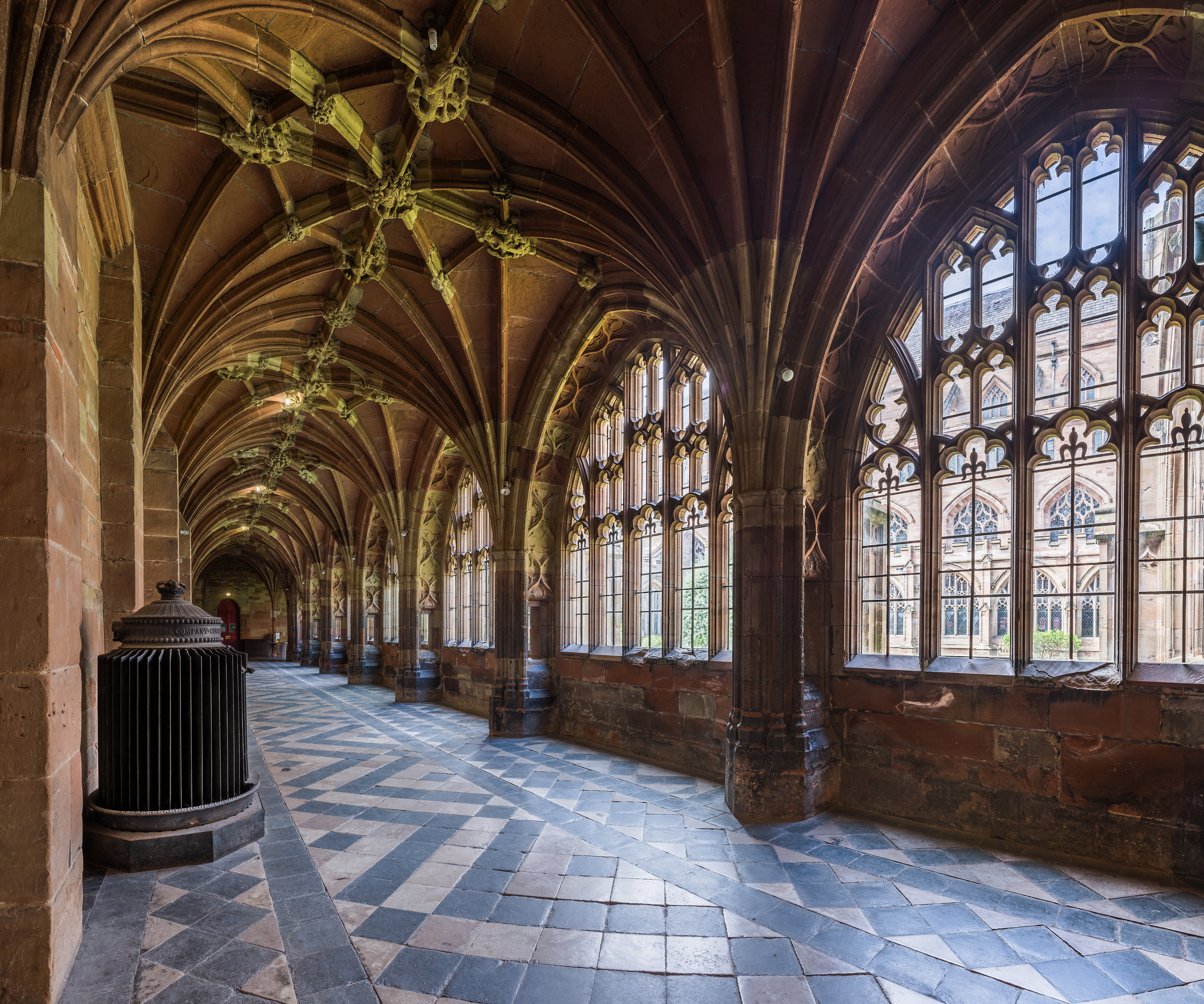
The medieval cloisters

Worcester was also a centre of medieval religious life; there were several monasteries until the dissolution. These included the Greyfriars, Blackfriars, Penitent Sisters and the Benedictine Priory, now Worcester Cathedral. Monastic houses provided hospitals and education, including Worcester School. The St. Wulstan Hospital was founded around 1085 and was dissolved with the monasteries in 1540. The St. Oswald Hospital was possibly founded by St Oswald. Substantial lands and property in Worcester were held by the church.

Domesday Book also records a considerable number of town houses belonging to rural landowners, presumably used as residences while selling produce from their lands.

In the 1100s, Worcester suffered a number of city fires. The first was on 19 June 1113, destroying town, castle and cathedral, and the second in November 1131.

The following century, the town (then better defended) was attacked several times (in 1139, 1150 and 1151) during the Anarchy, i.e. civil war between King Stephen and Empress Matilda, daughter of Henry I. The 1139 attack again resulted in fire and destruction of a portion of the city, with citizens being held for ransom.

Another fire in 1189 destroyed much of the city for the fourth time that century.

Worcester received its first royal charter in 1189. This set out the annual payment made to the Crown as £24 per annum, and set out that the city would deal directly with the Crown's Exchequer, rather than through the county sheriff, who would no longer have general jurisdiction over the city. However, under King John, Worcester's charter was not renewed, which allowed him to levy increasing and arbitrary taxation (tallage) on Worcester.

King John made eleven visits to Worcester, including at his first Easter as King in 1200. Wulstan was made a saint in 1203, and John visited his shrine in 1207. He appears to have developed an attachment to Wulstan's cult because he appeared to support the authority of kings.

John attempted to claim the right to appoint English bishops, which led him into a long dispute with the Pope. Bishop Mauger of Worcester was appointed by the Pope to enforce his Interdict, alongside the Bishops of London and Ely. He was forced into exile and his possessions confiscated as a result.

John spent Christmas 1214 at Worcester, During his disputes with the Barons over the administration of justice, before returning to London where discussions leading to Magna Carta began. In 1216, the barons asked the French Dauphin to depose John. This brought conflict to Worcestershire, where the county's leaders organised against him, and allowed William Marshall, son of the Earl of Pembroke, who was loyal to John, to take possession of Worcester as governor. Ranulph, Earl of Chester attacked the city, took the castle and ransacked the Cathedral, where the garrison had attempted to take shelter. Marshal was warned of the attack by his father, and was able to escape.

The Priory was fined for protecting the rebels and were forced to melt down the treasures used to adorn St Wulfstan's tomb. The city of Worcester was fined £100 for its role; the lack of a Charter for the city enabled this arbitrary payment to be levied.

John was buried in the cathedral near Wulfstan's altar after he died.

In 1227, under King Henry III Worcester regained its charter and was granted more freedoms. The annual tax was increased to £30. The sheriff was again removed from his role representing the city to the Crown, except in some limited circumstances. A Gild Merchant was created, creating a trading monopoly for those admitted. Villeins who resided in the city for a year and day, and were members of the guild, were to be deemed free. Finally, the charter granted rights to levy tolls and taxation, and exemption from certain duties and taxes otherwise due to the Crown. The charter was renewed in 1264.

Worcester's institutions grew at a slower pace than most county towns and had detectably archaic echoes. It is likely that this is related to the power of the local aristocracy.

=== Jewish life, persecution and expulsions ===
Worcester had a small Jewish population by the late 12th century. It was one of a number of places allowed to keep records of debts, in an official locked chest known as an archa. (An archa or arca (plural archae/arcae) was a municipal chest in which deeds were preserved.) Jewish life probably centred around what is now Copenhagen Street.

The Diocese was notably hostile to the Jewish community in Worcester. Peter of Blois was commissioned by a Bishop of Worcester, probably John of Coutances, to write a significant anti-Judaic treatise Against the Perfidy of Jews around 1190. William de Blois, as Bishop of Worcester, imposed particularly strict rules on Jews within the diocese in 1219. As elsewhere in England, Jews were officially compelled to wear square white badges, supposedly representing tabulae. In most places, this requirement was relinquished as long as fines were paid. In addition to enforcing the church laws on wearing badges, Blois tried to impose additional restrictions on usury, and wrote to Pope Gregory in 1229 to ask for better enforcement and further, harsher measures. In response, the Papacy demanded that Christians be prevented from working in Jewish homes, "lest temporal profit be preferred to the zeal of Christ", and enforcement of the wearing of badges.

A national assembly of Jewish notables was summoned to Worcester by the Crown in 1240 to assess their wealth for taxation; at which Henry III "squeezed the largest tallage of the thirteenth century from his Jewish subjects."

In 1263 Worcester's Jewish residents were attacked by a baronial force led by Robert Earl Ferrers and Henry de Montfort. Most were killed. Ferrers used this opportunity to remove the titles to his debts by taking the archae. The massacre in Worcester was part of a wider campaign by the De Montforts and their allies in the run up to the Second Barons' War, aimed at undermining Henry III. Simon de Montfort had previously been engaged in a campaign of persecution of Jewish communities in Leicester. A massacre of London's Jewry also took place during the war. On 16 January 1275, the queen mother Eleanor of Provence was given permission to expel Jews from towns under her jurisdiction, and within the year, those still remaining in Worcester were forced to move to Hereford.

=== Evolution of craft guilds ===
Guild	Incorporated	Notes
Merchants	1227	Dominant guild, in some periods nearly synonymous with the council structure
Cordwainers and shoemakers	By 1316	Owed Earl of Warwick two pairs of leggings per annum
Cordwainers	1504	Governed by a master, two wardens and three assistants, met in the Trinity Hall. Ordinances of 1558, silver seal and cup existed in 1857.
Joiners and carpenters	1690	Governed by a master, two wardens and eight assistants
Bakers	Before 1496	Governed by two wardens, youngest master was beadle. Ordinances of 1496 and 1563 exist. Met Greyfriars.
Glovers and pursers	1497	
Mercers and grocers	1545	
Tailors and drapers	1551	
Ironmongers	1598	
Butchers	1604	
Barbers and tallowchandlers	1677	
Bricklayers	1713	
Coopers	1726	
Masons	1739	

Through the medieval and early modern period, Worcester developed a system of craft guilds. Guilds regulated who could work in a trade, trade practices and training, and provided social support for members.

The city's late medieval ordinances banned tilers from forming a guild, and encouraged tilers to settle in Worcester to trade freely. Roofs of thatch and wooden chimneys were banned in order to reduce fire risks.

=== Late medieval ===
Worcester's Ordinances of the sixth year of Edward IV, renewed in 1496–7, and detailed in 82 clauses, give a detailed picture of life and city organisation in the late medieval period. They were to be enforced by the city's bailiffs. Chamberlains received and accounted for rents and other income and the use of common lands within Worcester was set out. Trade regulations covered bread and ale. Others dealt with sanitation, fire regulations and upkeep of the city wall, quays and pavements. Public order and crimes including affray are covered. Citizens were given the privilege of being imprisoned underneath the Guildhall rather than in the town jail, except for the most serious offences.

The cloth industry was also regulated by the Ordinances. Apart from regulation of weights and measures, the ordinances also attempted to protect the artisans engaged in the trade. Payment in kind was banned, with fines of 20 shillings for anyone making payment other than with gold and silver. People were only to be employed if they lived in the city and its suburbs.

Worcester elected members of Parliament at the Guildhall, by males "of suche as hev dwellynge wtin the ffraunches and by the moste voice." That is, by shouting. Members of Parliament had to own freehold property worth 40 shillings a year, and be "of good name and fame, not outlawed, not acombred in accyons as nygh as men may knowe, for worshipp of the seid cite". Their wages were levied by the Constable.

The ordinances also mandated that the then-neglected pageants of the crafts take place five times a year, and set out a few general rules for newcomers expecting to set up their trade in the city. A master craftsman was obliged to make customary payments to the wardens of the craft. A journeyman would after a fortnight have to pay dues to the wardens.

The city council was organised by a system of co-option. There were 24 members of the high chamber, and 48 of the lower chamber. Committees appointed the two Bailiffs and made financial decisions, while the two chambers agreed the city's rules, or ordinances.

By late medieval times the population had grown to 1,025 families, excluding the cathedral quarter, so probably stood under 10,000. Worcester had grown beyond the limits of its walls with a number of suburbs.

The manufacture of cloth and allied trades started to become a large local industry. For instance, Leland stated in the mid 1500s that "The welthe of the towne of Worcestar standithe most by draping, and noe towne of England, at this present tyme, maketh so many cloathes yearly as this towne doth."

The glove-making trade has its roots in this period.

== Early modern ==
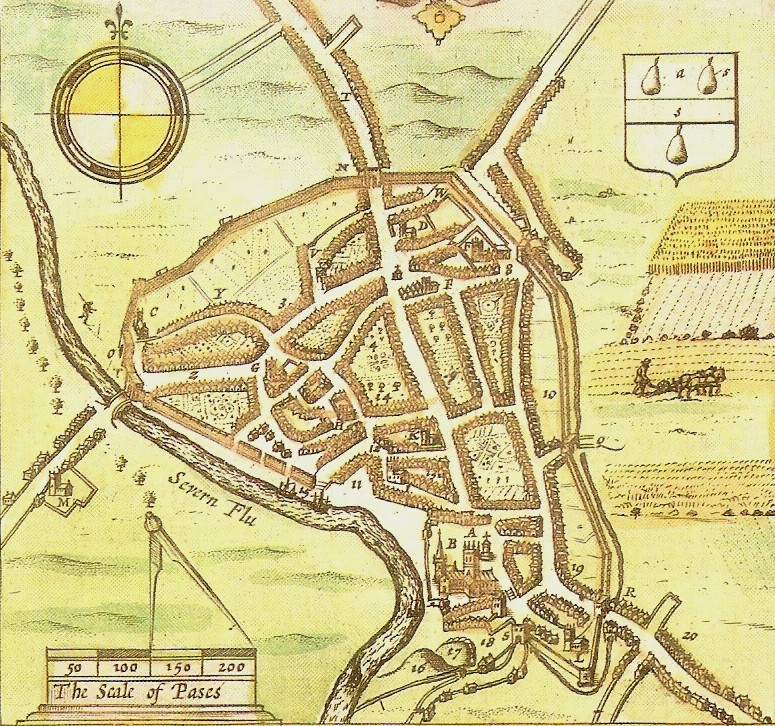
Worcester, 1610 map

The Dissolution of the monasteries saw the Priory's status change, as it lost its Benedictine monks. There were around 36 monks plus the Prior at dissolution in 1540 and some 16 were given pensions immediately or soon after, the rest being employed in the new Deanery. It was necessary to establish 'public schools' to replace monastic education in Worcester as elsewhere. This led to the establishment of King's School. Worcester School continued to teach. St Oswald's Hospital survived the dissolution, later providing almshouses; the charity and its housing survives to the present.

Queen Elizabeth I and her council stayed at the Bishop's Palace in August 1575 during her progress. Bailiff Christopher Dighton presented a cup filled with silver coins, and the Earl of Leicester was given two gallons of spiced hippocras wine. Elizabeth visited Hindlip Hall and hunted deer in Hallow Park with John Habington.

The city was given the right to elect a mayor and was designated a county corporate in 1621, giving it autonomy from local government. From this point, Worcester was governed by a mayor, recorder and six aldermen. Councillors were selected through co-option.

Worcester in this period contained green spaces such as orchards and fields between its main streets within the city wall boundary, as evidenced by John Speed's map of 1610. The walls were still more or less complete at this time, but suburbs had also been established beyond them.

=== Civil War ===
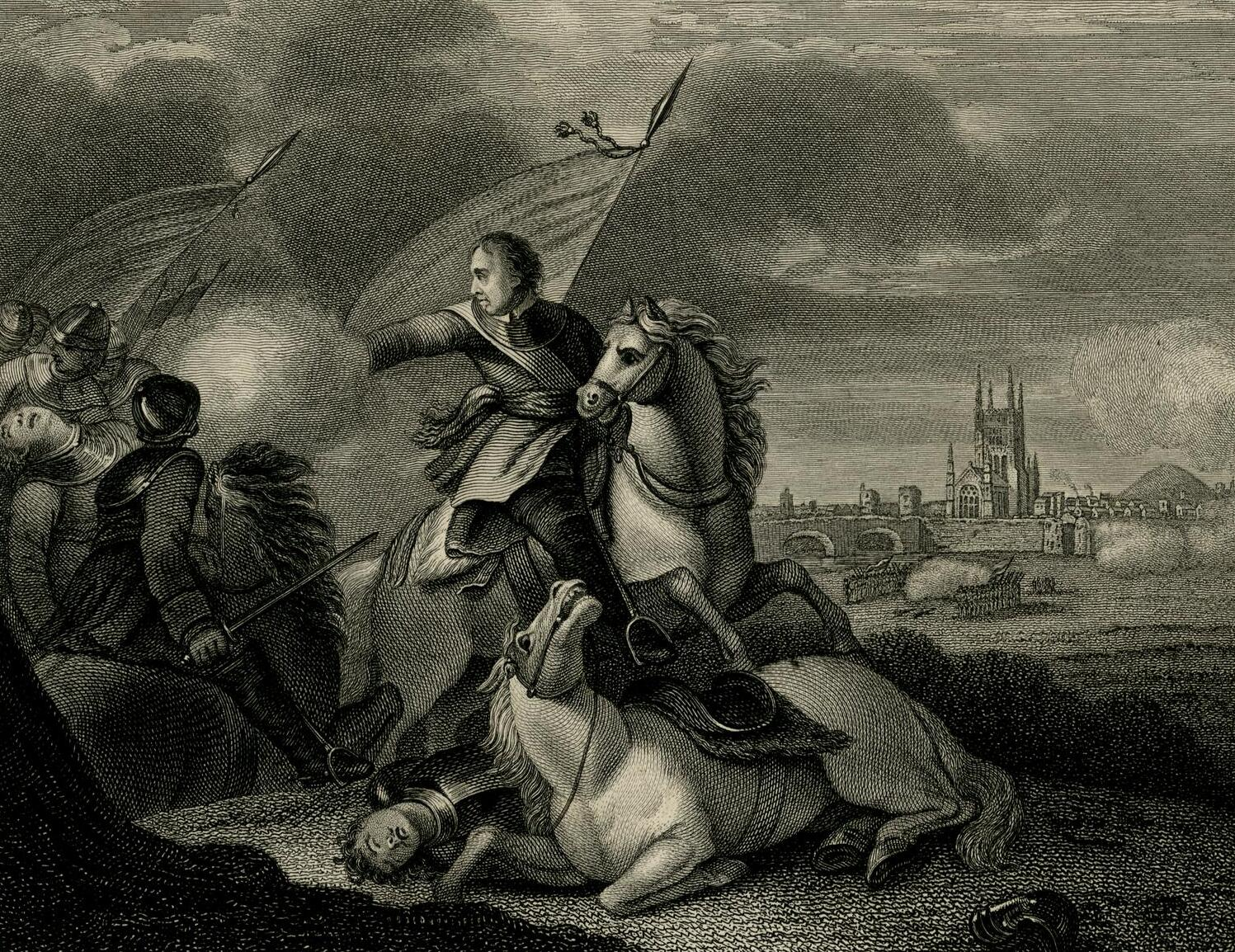
Battle of Worcester (illustration made c. 1760 – c. 1770)

Worcester equivocated about whether to support the Parliamentary cause before the outbreak of civil war in 1642, eventually siding with Parliament. The city was swiftly occupied by the Royalists, who billeted their troops in the city and used the cathedral to store munitions. The Earl of Essex briefly retook the city for Parliament after the skirmish at the Battle of Powick Bridge, the first engagement of the war. Parliamentary troops then ransacked the cathedral building. Stained glass was smashed and the organ destroyed, along with library books and monuments. Essex was soon forced to withdraw, after the Battle of Edgehill.

The city spent the rest of the First Civil War under Royalist control, as did the county, for the most part. Worcester was a garrison town with a Royalist governor, and had to bear high taxation for sustaining and billeting a large number of Royalist troops. The city walls which were in a lamentable state at the start of the war were strengthened, and houses close to the walls were demolished by Worcester women after the first siege in 1643 to give the defenders a clear field of fire.

As Royalist power collapsed in May 1646, Worcester was placed under siege for the second time. Worcester had around 5,000 civilians, together with a Royalist garrison of around 1,500 men, facing a 2,500-5,000 strong force of the New Model Army. Worcester finally surrendered on 23 July, bringing the first civil war to a close in Worcestershire.

In 1651 a Scottish army, 16,000 strong, marched south along the west coast in support of Charles II's attempt to regain the Crown. When the army approached, Worcester's council voted to surrender, fearing further violence and destruction. The Parliamentary garrison withdrew to Evesham in the face of the overwhelming numbers against them. The Scots were billeted in and around the city, again at great expense and causing new anxiety for the residents. The Scots were joined by very limited local forces, including a company of 60 men under Francis Talbot.

The Battle of Worcester (3 September 1651), took place in the fields a little to the west and south of the city, near the village of Powick. Charles II was easily defeated by Cromwell's forces of 30,000 men. Charles II returned to his headquarters in what is now known as King Charles House in the Cornmarket, before fleeing in disguise with Talbot's help to Boscobel House in Shropshire, from where he eventually escaped to France.

In the aftermath of the battle, Worcester was heavily looted by the Parliamentarian army, with an estimated £80,000 of damage done. Around 10,000 prisoners, mostly Scots, were held captive, and either sent to work on The Fens drainage projects, or transported to the New World.

From 1646 to 1660, the bishopric was abolished and the cathedral fell into disrepair.

=== After the Restoration ===
After the restoration of the monarchy in 1660, Worcester cleverly used its location as the site of the final battles of the First Civil War (1646) and Third Civil War (1651) to mount an appeal for compensation from the new King Charles II. As part of this and not based upon any historical fact, it invented the epithet Fidelis Civitas (The Faithful City) and this motto has since been incorporated into the city's coat of arms. Around 1690, a news-sheet started publication, which later became known as one of the oldest newspapers in the world, Berrow's Worcester Journal.

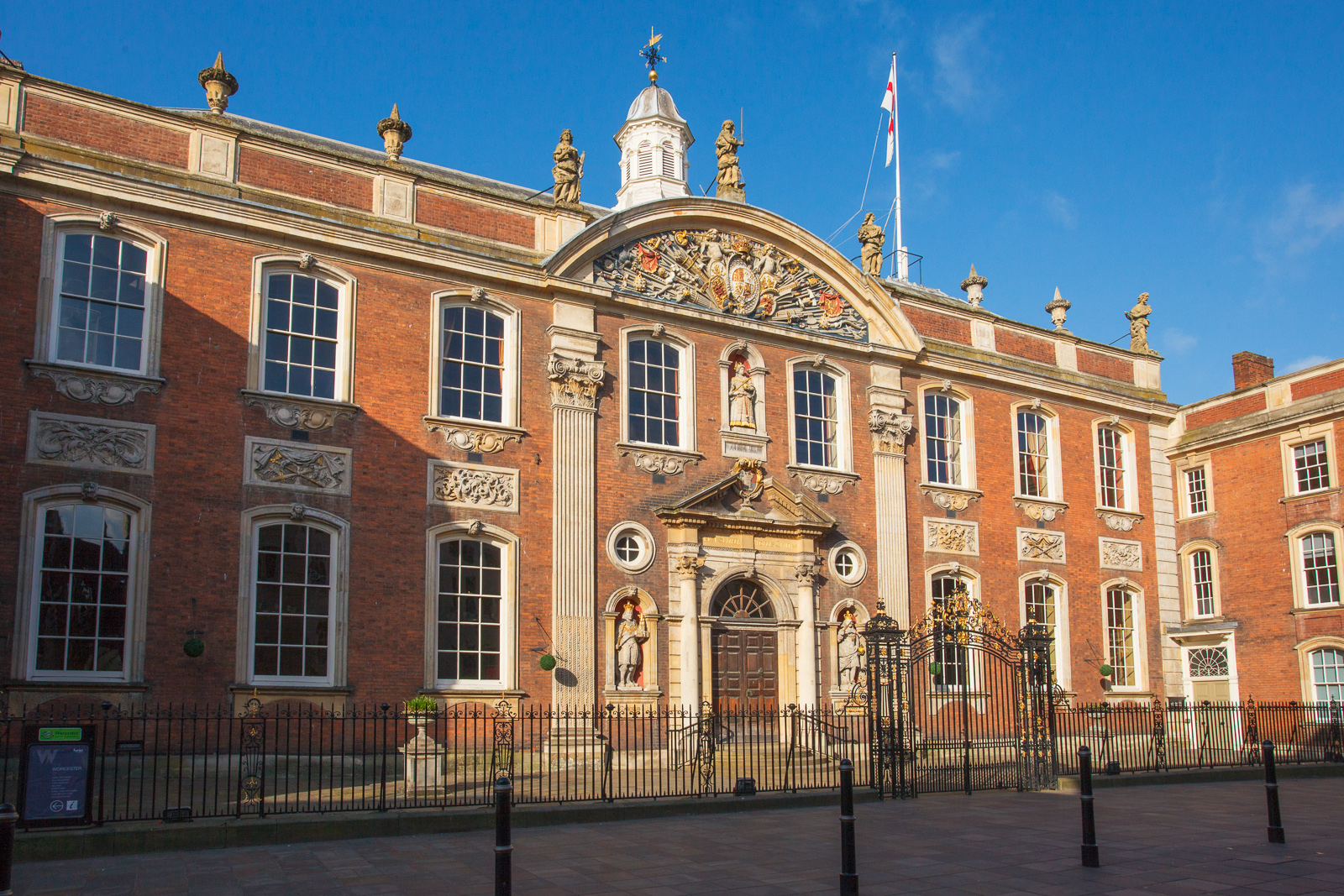
Worcester Guildhall

During the 18th century Worcester experienced significant economic growth, and in 1748 Daniel Defoe could note that 'the inhabitants are generally esteemed rich, being full of business, occasioned chiefly by the clothing-trade'. In 1751 Dr John Wall and his partners established the Royal Worcester Porcelain Company factory at Warmstry Slip, and rival porcelain manufacturers sprang up from the 1780s onwards. Glovemaking became a major local industry from the later 18th century, and by 1830 a total of 108 glove manufacturers were trading in the city.

Worcester's prosperity in the 18th and early 19th centuries is reflected in the city's architecture, which has been described as 'one of the most impressive Georgian streetscapes in the Midlands'. Many public buildings were rebuilt in this period, including the Grade I listed Worcester Guildhall, which was rebuilt in the Queen Anne style in 1721 and was described by Nikolaus Pevsner as 'a fine town hall...as splendid as any of the C18 in England'. The city's medieval bridge was demolished and rebuilt further downstream in 1771-80, and in 1771 a new infirmary was opened on the northern edge of the city at Castle Street. Large stretches of the city walls had been removed by 1796, which allowed for continued urban expansion along Foregate Street, The Tything, and Upper Tything. Many townhouses were built or remodelled in brick in this period, and surviving and excavated examples were often decorated with ornate plaster- and woodwork, ironwork, and other popular furnishings like delftware tiles.

Georgian Worcester was a popular destination for wealthy visitors, who came to the city for business and leisure. The annual Three Choirs Festival was first held in the city in 1719, and Pitchcroft hosted its first horse race on 27 June 1718. These visitors provided custom to the city's numerous coaching inns, and several 18th- and early 19th-century examples survive on Broad Street and Foregate Street.

Like many Georgian cities, parts of Worcester suffered from significant urban poverty. In 1702 a workhouse was built in Foregate Street using income from the city's hop market, and was replaced in 1794 by a larger building on Tallow Hill. By 1800 it housed 200 people, and in 1811 it issued a series of private trade tokens 'to accommodate the public in the present scarcity of small change'.

== Industrial revolution, Victorian and Edwardian eras ==
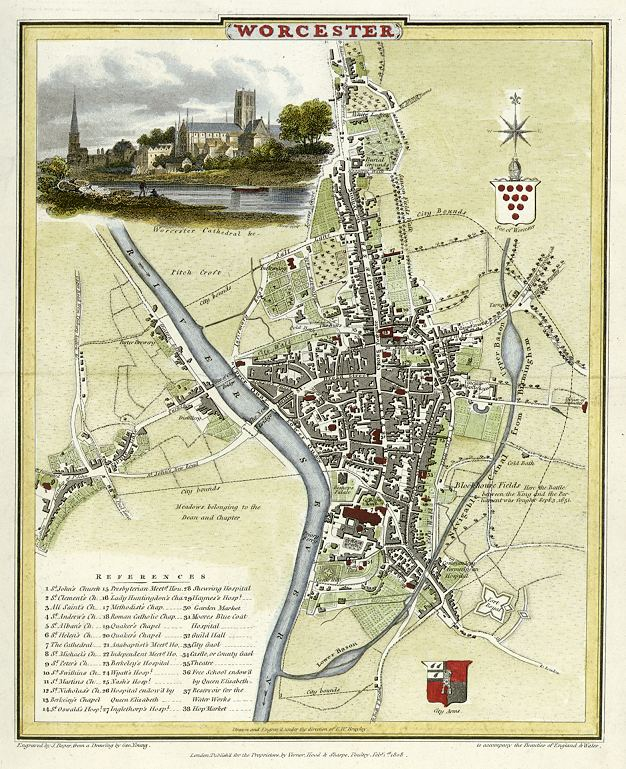
Map of Worcester in 1806

During the late 18th and early 19th centuries, Worcester was a major centre for glove-making, employing nearly half the glovers in England at its peak (over 30,000 people). In 1815 the Worcester and Birmingham Canal opened, allowing Worcester goods to be transported to a larger conurbation.

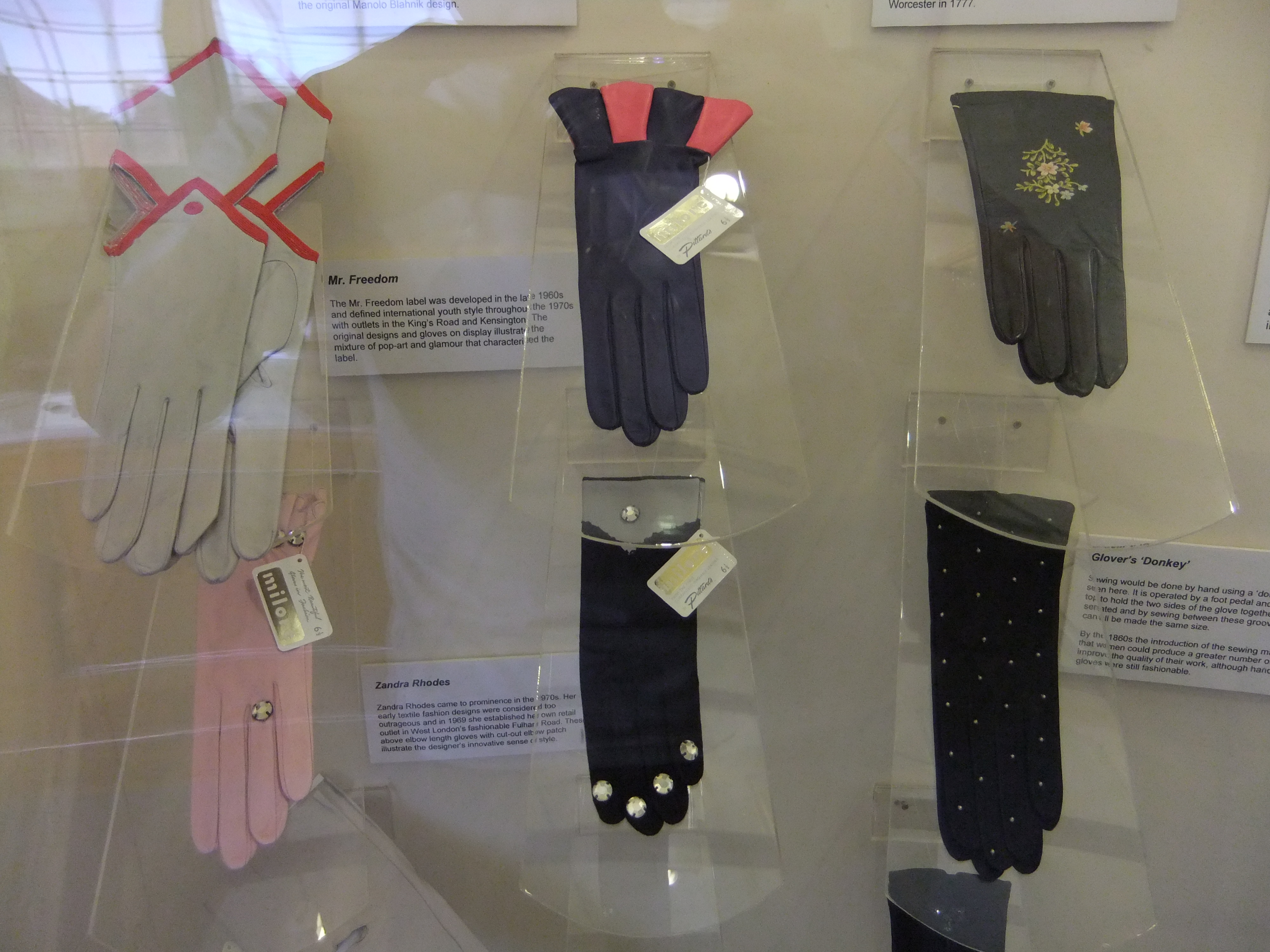
Gloves, Worcester City Art Gallery & Museum

Later in that century the industry declined after import taxes on foreign competitors, mainly from France, were greatly reduced.

Riots took place in 1831, in response to the defeat of the Reform Bill, reflecting discontent with the city administration and the wider lack of democratic representation. Riots occurred elsewhere, including Bristol. Local government reform took place in 1835, which for the first time created election procedures for councillors, but also restricted the ability of the city to buy and sell property, requiring Treasury permission. Until that year, the legal distinction between a select group of citizens with specific privileges and other residents of the town had survived.

Political troubles continued throughout the Victorian and Edwardian period, with Worcester becoming notorious for corrupt political practices. Through the period, attempts were made to reduce and eliminate electoral bribery through national legislation. As the franchise widened, attempts to fix elections through bribes, fake employment in campaigns and gifts of beer became very expensive, making it politically preferable to crack down on them. Nevertheless, such practices persisted in Worcester, allowing Worcester to retain Conservative representation in 1892 against a Liberal landslide, leading to investigations being made. A Royal Commission in 1906 finally found that around 500 men on low incomes regarded the purchase of their vote as something they should expect as of right, and a welcome addition to their subsistence. The campaign by liberals to end electoral corruption was not welcomed, and led to underperformance by that party for many years.

The British Medical Association (BMA) was founded in the Board Room of the old Worcester Royal Infirmary building in Castle Street in 1832.

Lea & Perrins Worcestershire sauce has been made and bottled in Worcester since around 1837, first produced by two chemists, it is claimed according to a recipe supplied by an unnamed "Nobleman of the County". Production expanded, and a new factory was opened at the Midland Road on 16 October 1897, which accommodated exports to the US

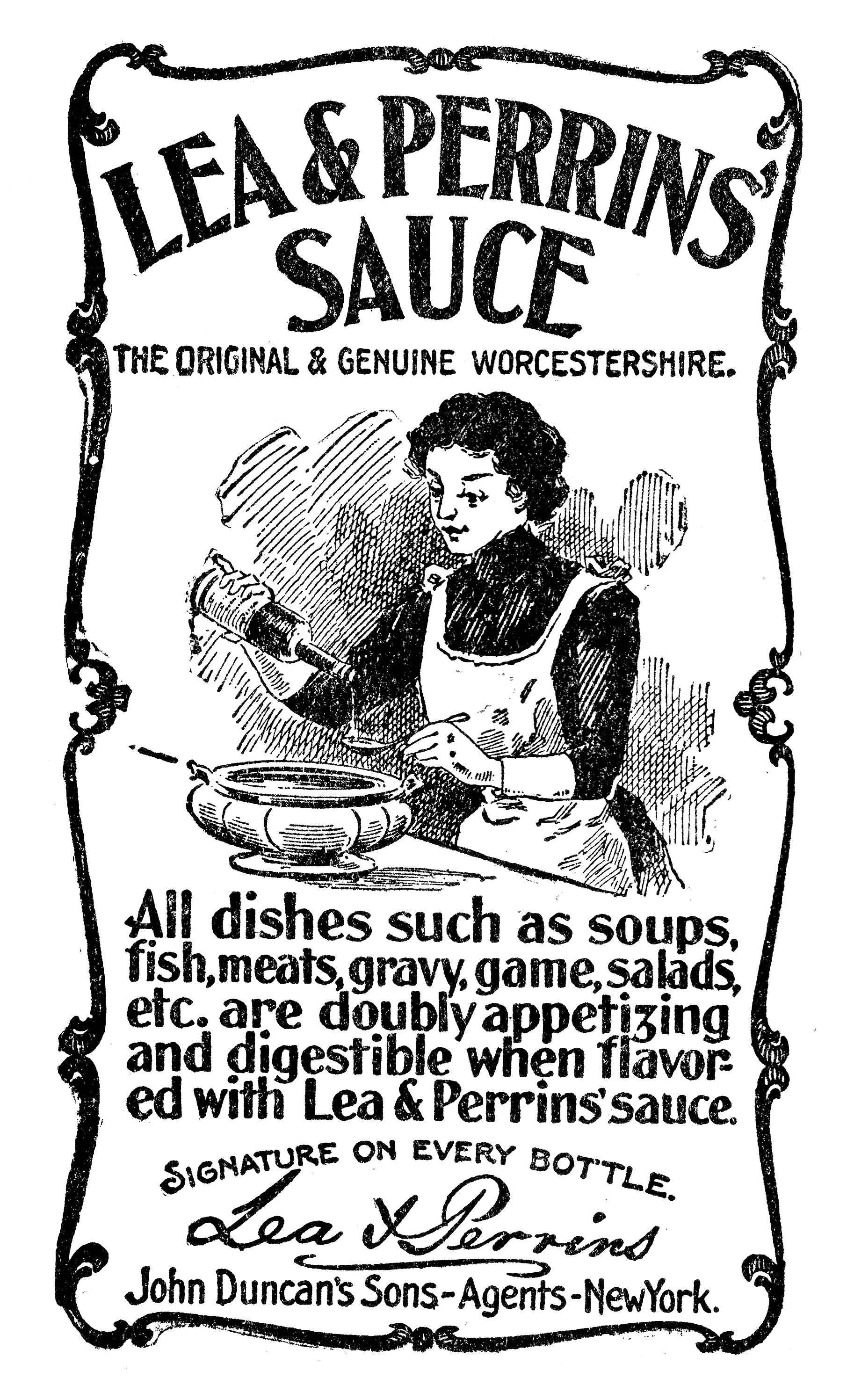
Lea & Perrins advertisement (1900)

Railways came to Worcester in 1850, with the opening Shrub Hill station, jointly owned by the Oxford, Worcester and Wolverhampton Railway and the Midland Railway, initially running to Birmingham only. Foregate Street was opened in 1860 by the Hereford and Worcester Railway, quickly incorporated into the West Midland Railway. The WMR lines became part of the Great Western Railway after 1 August 1863. The railways also gave Worcester thousands of jobs with just under half of all GWR passenger coaches built in Worcester and the three signalling factories including the largest railway signalling company in the World: McKenzie & Holland.

In 1882 Worcester hosted the Worcestershire Exhibition, inspired by the earlier Great Exhibition in London. There were sections for exhibits of fine arts (over 600 paintings), historical manuscripts and industrial items. The profit was £1,867.9s.6d and the number of visitors is recorded as 222,807. Some of the profit from the exhibition was used to build the Victoria Institute in Foregate Street, Worcester, which opened on 1 October 1896 and originally housed the city art gallery and museum.

The late-Victorian period saw the growth of ironfounders, including Heenan & Froude, Hardy & Padmore and McKenzie & Holland.

== 1914 to present ==
Worcester was a centre for recruitment of soldiers to fight in the First World War, into the Worcestershire Regiment, which was based at Norton Barracks. The regiment took part in early battles in the war, most notably at the Battle of Gheluvelt in October 1914, which prevented the German army from reaching Belgian ports. (Note: Worcester's Gheluvelt Park was opened in 1922 to commemorate the battle and war dead.)

The newly-appointed Vicar of St Paul's, Geoffrey Studdert Kennedy, was among those urging Worcester's men to enlist. He became an army chaplain, later known as 'Woodbine Willy', as he brought cigarettes to soldiers during fighting and exposed himself to physical danger, earning him a Military Cross. Shops in Worcester organised collections to supply him with cigarettes. His experience of war pushed him towards pacifism and Christian Socialism. After the war, he left his Worcester parish, but kept a house in the city for the rest of his life.

Rail reorganisation in 1922 saw the Midland Railway's routes from Shrub Hill absorbed into the London, Midland and Scottish Railway.

Rapid growth in leading engineering and machine-tool manufacturing firms took place in the inter-war years and all became major employers in the city. Companies such as such as James Archdale & Co. and H. W. Ward who made castings for the motor and aircraft industries; the cockpit canopies for World War II Lancaster bombers were made by Worcester Windshields and Casements. Valve design and manufacture were from Alley & MacLellan, Sentinel Valve Works, mining machinery from Mining Engineering Company (MECO), later part of Joy Mining Machinery, and metal cans and containers from Metal Box Co in 1930 also a large Worcester employer which became Novar plc through acquisitions of Carnaud Metal Box PLC.

During the Second World War, the city was chosen to be the seat of an evacuated government in case of mass German invasion. The War Cabinet, along with Winston Churchill and some 16,000 state workers, would have moved to Hindlip Hall (now part of the complex forming the Headquarters of West Mercia Police), 3 miles (4.8 km) north of Worcester and Parliament would have temporarily seated in Stratford-upon-Avon. The former RAF station RAF Worcester was located east of Northwick.

A fuel storage depot was constructed in 1941-2 by Shell-Mex and BP (later operated by Texaco) for the government on the eastern bank of the River Severn, about one mile south of Worcester. There were six 4,000 ton semi-buried tanks for the storage of white oils. It had no rail or road loading facilities but distribution could be carried out by barge through the Diglis basin and the depot could receive fuel either by barge or the GPSS pipeline network. It was at one time used as a civil reserve storing gas oil and then stored aviation kerosene for the United States Air Forces in Europe (USAFE). In the early 1990s it was closed down and the site was sold for housing in the 2000s.

By the middle of the 20th century, only a few Worcester gloving companies survived since gloves became less fashionable and free trade allowed in cheaper imports from the Far East. Nevertheless, at least three large glove manufacturing companies survived until the late 20th century: Dent Allcroft, Fownes and Milore. Queen Elizabeth II's coronation gloves were designed and manufactured in the Worcester-based Dent Allcroft & Co. factory.

In the 1950s and 1960s large areas of the medieval centre of Worcester were demolished and rebuilt as a result of decisions by town planners. This was condemned by many such as Nikolaus Pevsner who described it as a "totally incomprehensible... act of self-mutilation". There is still a significant area of medieval Worcester remaining, examples of which can be seen along City Walls Road, Friar Street and New Street, but it is a small fraction of what was present before the redevelopments.

The current city boundaries date from 1974, when the Local Government Act 1972 transferred the parishes of Warndon and St. Peter the Great County into the city.

Worcester Porcelain closed down in 2009 due to the recession. However, the site of the factory still houses the Museum of Royal Worcester, and a handful of decorators are still employed at the factory. Since 2015 there has been extensive re-development of the quarter, entirely devoted to housing.

While part of the Royal Infirmary hospital was demolished to make way for the University of Worcester's new city campus, the original Georgian building has been preserved. One of the old wards opened as a medical museum, the Infirmary, in 2012.

The foundry heritage of the city is represented by Morganite Crucible at Norton which produces graphitic shaped products and cements for use in the modern industry.

The city is home to the European manufacturing plant of Yamazaki Mazak Corporation, a global Japanese machine tool builder, which was established in 1980.

== Images ==
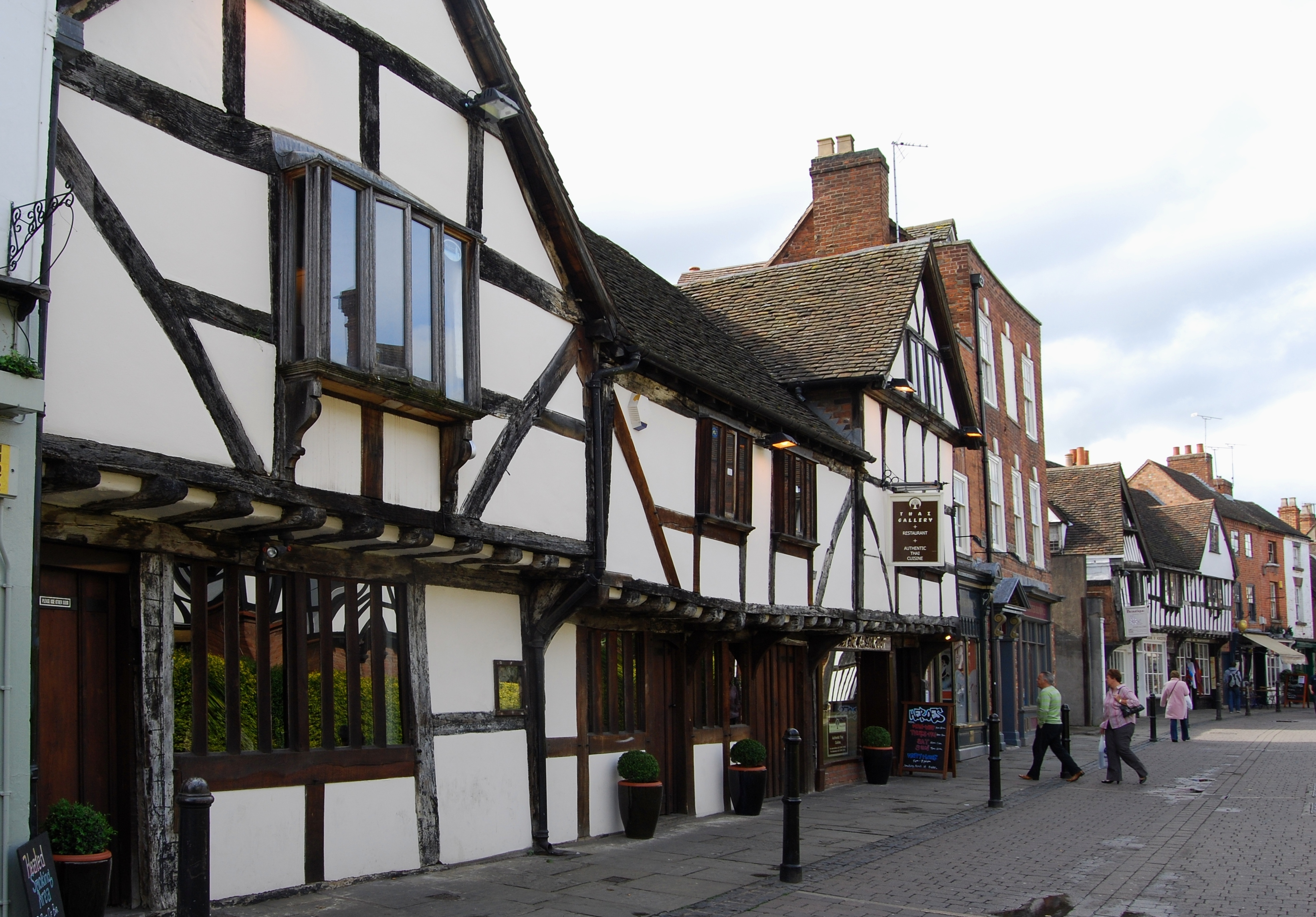
Tudor buildings in Friar Street

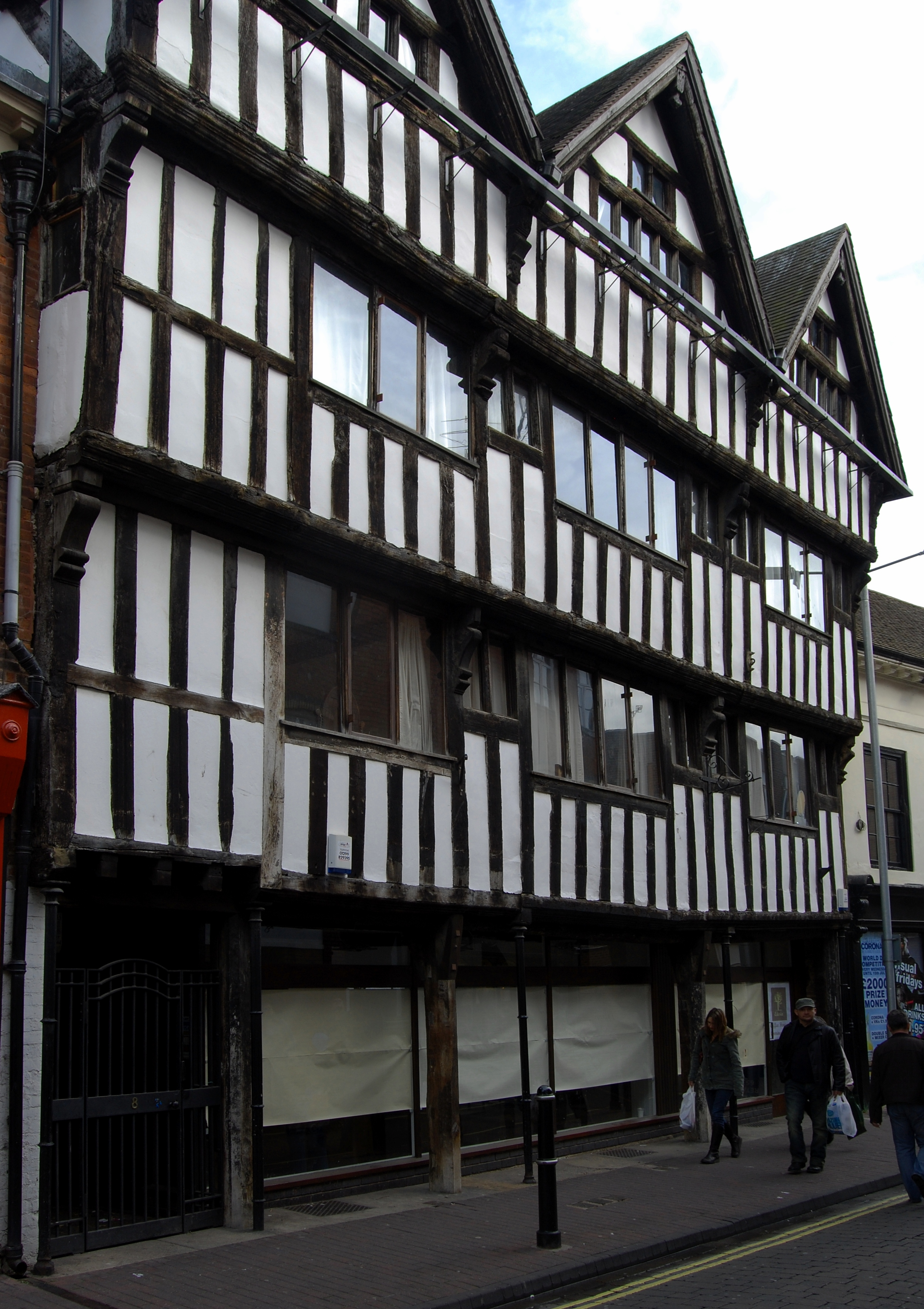
Tudor building with jettied upper storey in New Street

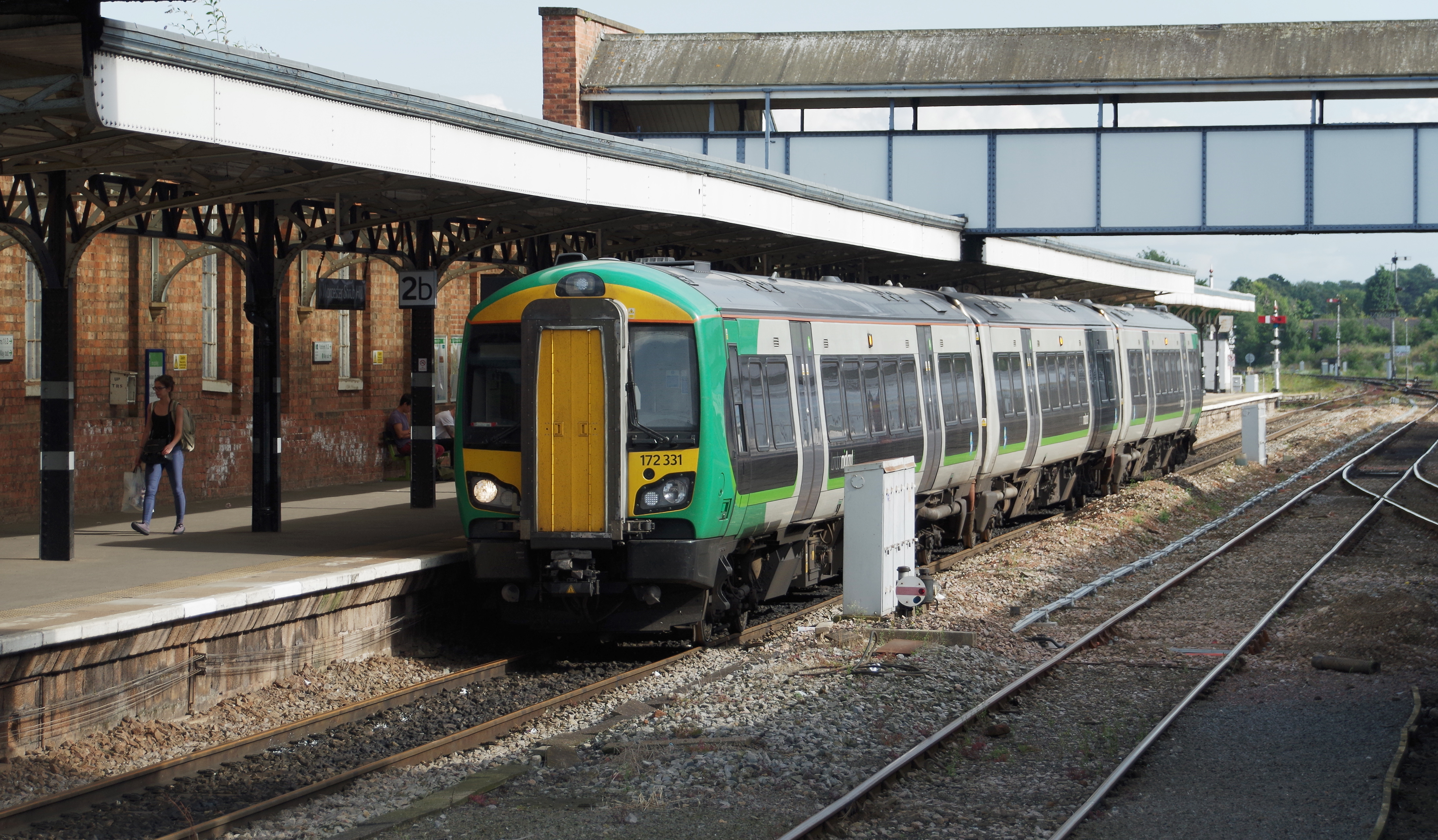
Worcester Shrub Hill railway station with a London Midland train

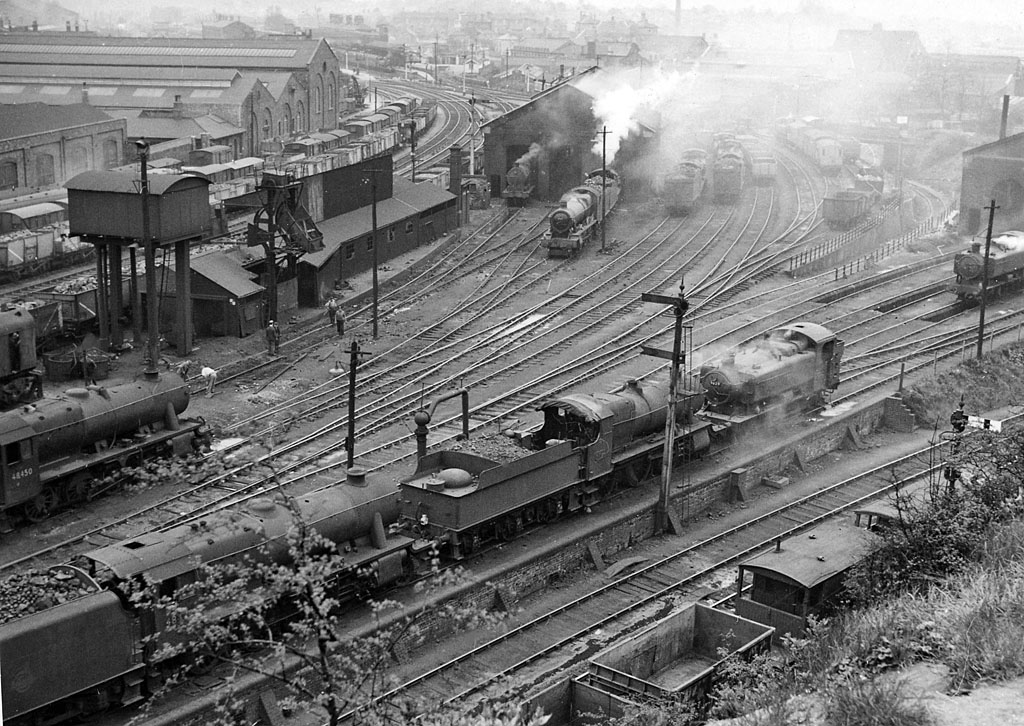
Worcester Locomotive Depot 1959

== See also ==
- List of Bishops of Worcester
- Worcester City Art Gallery & Museum
- Jewish Community of Worcester
- History of Worcestershire
