= John Sandon =

British expert on ceramics and glass

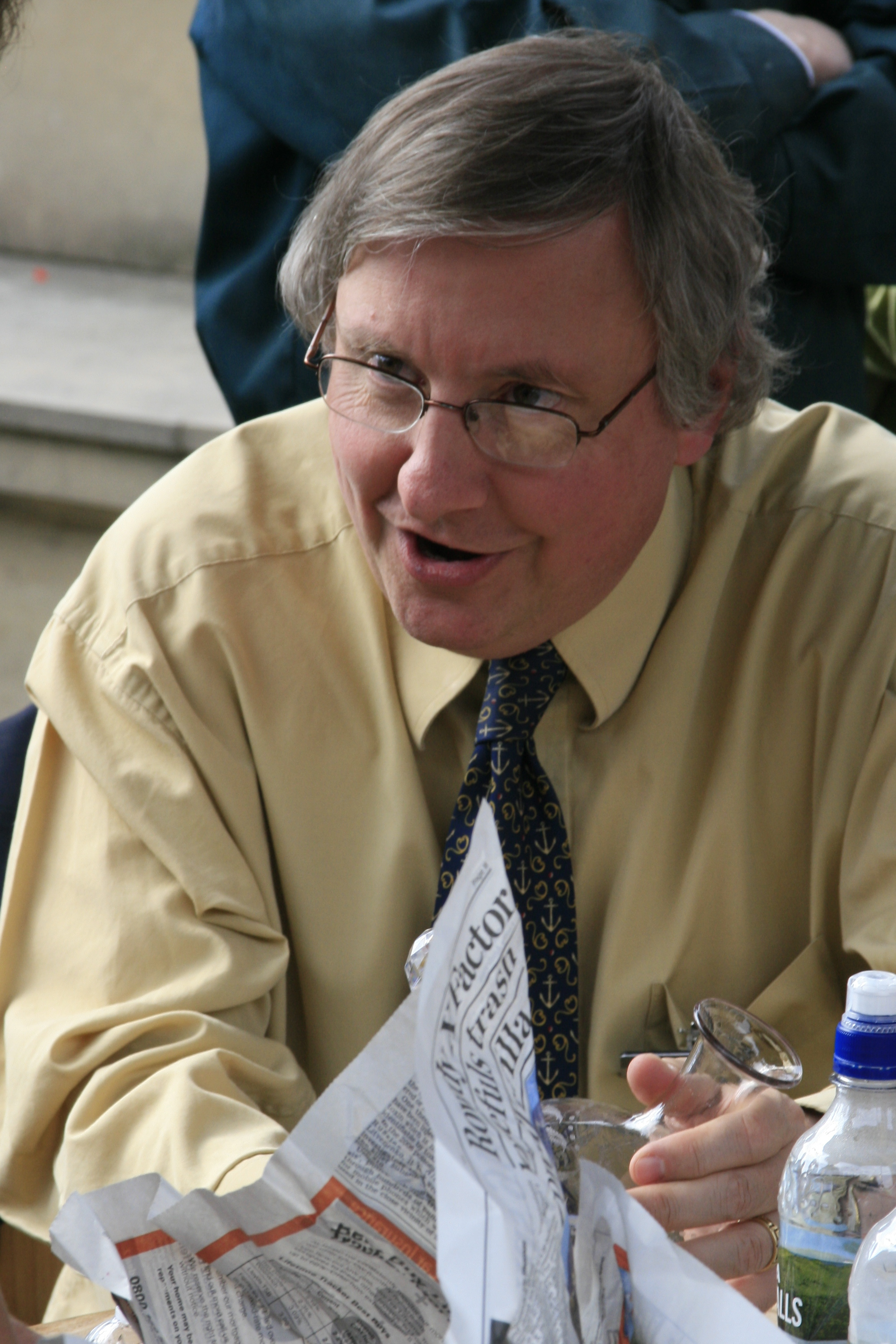
- Sandon at the Antiques Roadshow
- Born: 1959 (age 66–67); Worcester, England
- Occupations: Antique expert; TV personality; author
- Years active: 1975–present
- Known for: Expert on ceramics and glass
- Television: Antiques Roadshow
- Father: Henry Sandon

John Sandon (born 1959) is a British expert and prolific author on ceramics and glass. He is best known as an expert on the BBC's Antiques Roadshow, which he joined in 1985.

== Biography ==
Sandon alongside his father during a recording of Antiques Roadshow, 2010

The son of Henry Sandon, a notable authority on Royal Worcester porcelain, John Sandon left school aged 16 and went to work at auction house Bonhams (formerly Phillips) in London in 1975, where he quickly established himself as a porcelain specialist. Since 1988 he has been the International Director of European Ceramics and Glass at Bonhams auctioneers in London. He is a world authority on European porcelain, and has written many books and articles on the subject.

Sandon has been involved in excavations at the Royal Worcester factory site and has authored or co-authored several books on the factory.

On 24 July 2013 Sandon took part as auctioneer for Bonhams covering the sale of Copeland porcelain, part of the contents of Trelissick House in Feock near Truro, Cornwall.

Sandon is a regular expert on the BBC's Antiques Roadshow.

When his father Henry died, on 25 December 2023, at the age of 95, Sandon said, "To the millions who tuned in every Sunday evening to watch the Antiques Roadshow, Henry was like a favourite uncle, whose enthusiasm for even the humblest piece of chipped china was infectious."

== Selected publications ==
- Sandon, John British Porcelain Shire Books (2009) ISBN 978-0-7478-0713-1
- Sandon, John Worcester Porcelain Shire Library (2009) ISBN 978-0-7478-0714-8
- Sandon, John Miller's Collecting Porcelain Miller's Publications (2002) ISBN 1-84000-613-7
- Sandon, John Phillips Guide to English Porcelain Murdoch Books (1993) ISBN 1-897730-02-0
- Sandon, John Collecting Porcelain Mitchell Beazley (2002) ISBN 1-84000-613-7
- Sandon, John Phillips Guide to English Porcelain of the 18th and 19th Centuries Premier Editions (1993) ISBN 1-897730-02-0
- Sandon, John The Dictionary of Worcester Porcelain: 1751-1851 Antique Collectors' Club Ltd (1999) ISBN 1-85149-156-2
- Sandon, John Starting to Collect Antique Glass Antique Collectors' Club Ltd (1999) ISBN 1-85149-452-9
- Sandon, John Antique Porcelain Antique Collectors' Club Ltd (1997) ISBN 1-85149-242-9
- Sandon, John The Ewers-Tyne Collection of Worcester Porcelain at Cheekwood (2007) ISBN 1-85149-558-4
