= John Stinton =

English painter

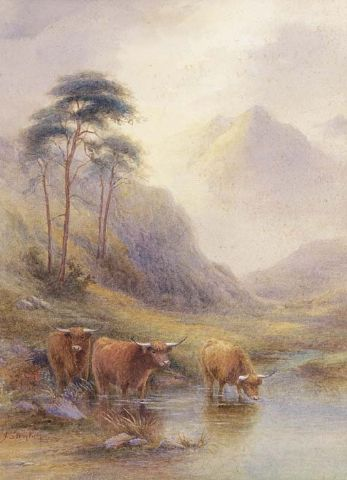
"Highland cattle in a stream"

John Stinton (jnr) (1854–1956) was a British ‘Royal Worcester’ painter best known for his ‘Highland Cattle’ scenes.

John Stinton (jnr) was one of the long lines of the Stinton family who painted for the Worcester firm for some 160 years. The family tradition started with Henry Stinton, employed from 1805 at the Grainger family's factory at St.Martins Gate in Worcester and would later become part of the ‘Royal Worcester’ group. John Stinton (snr) born in 1829, was Henry Stinton's son and started his apprenticeship at the Grainger factory when eleven years old, remaining there until his retirement in 1895. John (snr) was an accomplished artist and soon became a respected member of the Grainger staff. He discovered that oil of cloves would prevent his paints from drying out too quickly. John (snr)produced five sons, three following in their father's footsteps and becoming painters at the Worcester factories.

John Stinton was the eldest son, but did not take up china painting until the rather late age of thirty five. Besides Highland cattle, he depicted English cattle and produced many fine images of British castles on his plates and a large number of watercolour landscapes. He was an enthusiastic gardener, and built a heated greenhouse where he grew the tobacco for his constant pipe-smoking.

Four of John Stinton (jnr)'s children followed him into ceramic painting: Arthur Stinton, eldest son and born in 1878, joined the Grainger factory shortly after its amalgamation with Royal Worcester and then went on to the Locke factory where his uncle Walter was employed as a flower painter. Annie Stinton, born in 1882, also joined the Grainger factory and went on to the Royal Worcester works. Kate Stinton also born in 1882 worked at the Royal Worcester factory. Harry Stinton born in 1883 also painted Highland cattle scenes. He was a sickly child but grew to be a respected figure after joining the firm in 1896.
