= William Billingsley (artist) =

English painter

- Born: 1758; Derby
- Died: 1828 (aged 69–70)
- Known for: painting porcelain

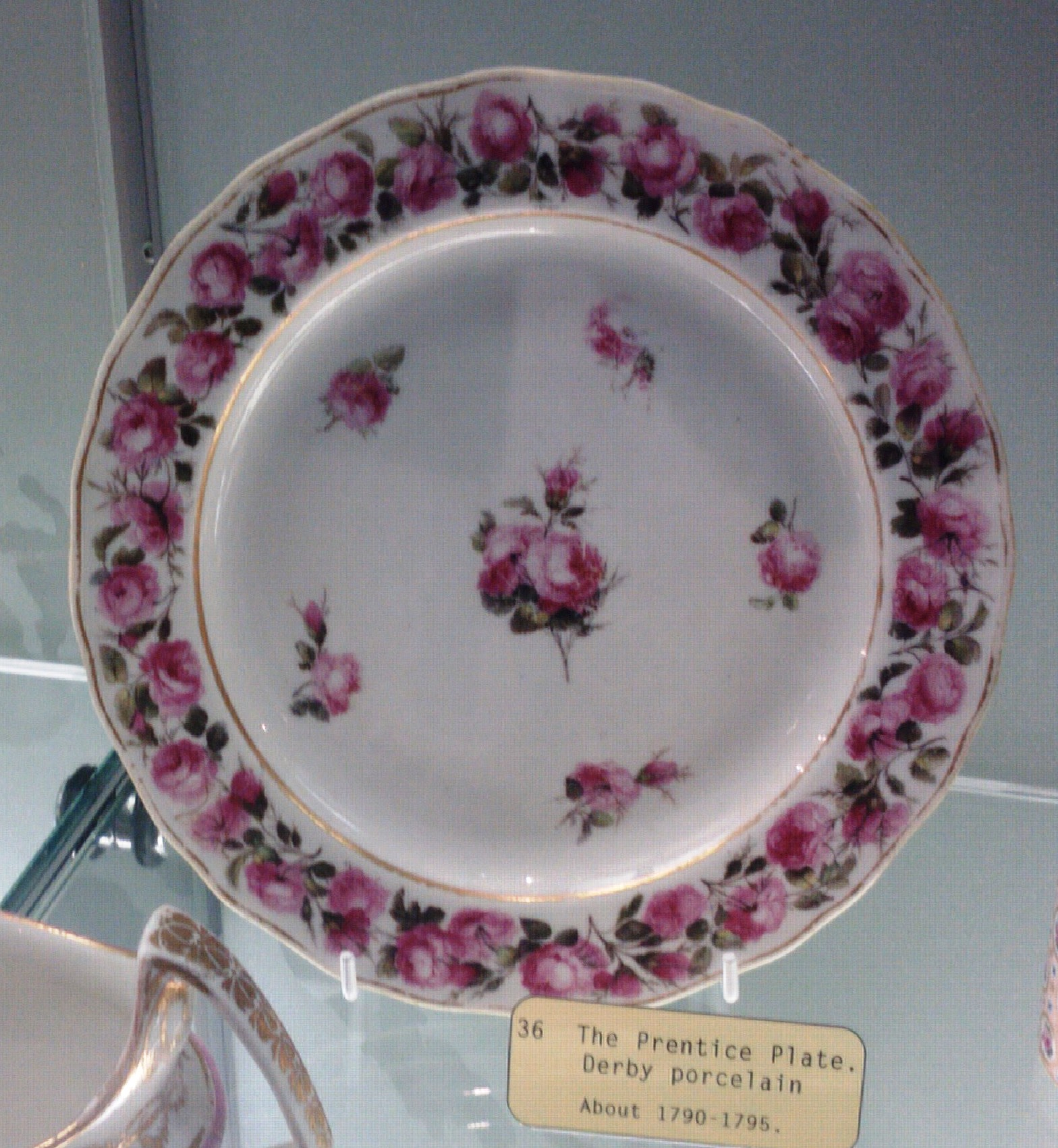
The Prentice Plate

William Billingsley (1758–1828) was an influential painter of porcelain in several English porcelain factories, who also developed his own recipe for soft-paste porcelain, which produced beautiful results but a very high rate of failure in firing. He is a leading name associated with the English Romantic style of paintings of groups of flowers on porcelain that is sometimes called "naturalistic" by older sources, although that may not seem its main characteristic today.

He trained in his home town of Derby, and though his work certainly reached the London market, all his many movements never took him further than the Midlands and South Wales, by then the heart of the British porcelain-making industry, although wares were often sent to London to be painted. His porcelain body was made by him at Pinxton and later at the Nantgarw Pottery, which he founded in 1813 with his son-in-law. He had spent over twenty years at Derby porcelain, a period after 1808 at Worcester porcelain, and ended his career at Coalport porcelain.

== Biography ==
Billingsley was born in Derby in 1758. He was apprenticed at William Duesbury's Royal Crown Derby porcelain works for five years on 26 September 1774. He finally left them in 1796, by which time he was their outstanding painter of flowers, the mainstay of decoration. Billingsley developed a distinctive style of flower painting, which involved using a loaded brush and then removing the colour using a dry brush. He was particularly associated with borders of roses with the prime example of the Prentice Plate. This plate was used in the Derby factories to show trainees the standard that was expected. The name of The Prentice Plate is a shortening of Apprentice Plate.

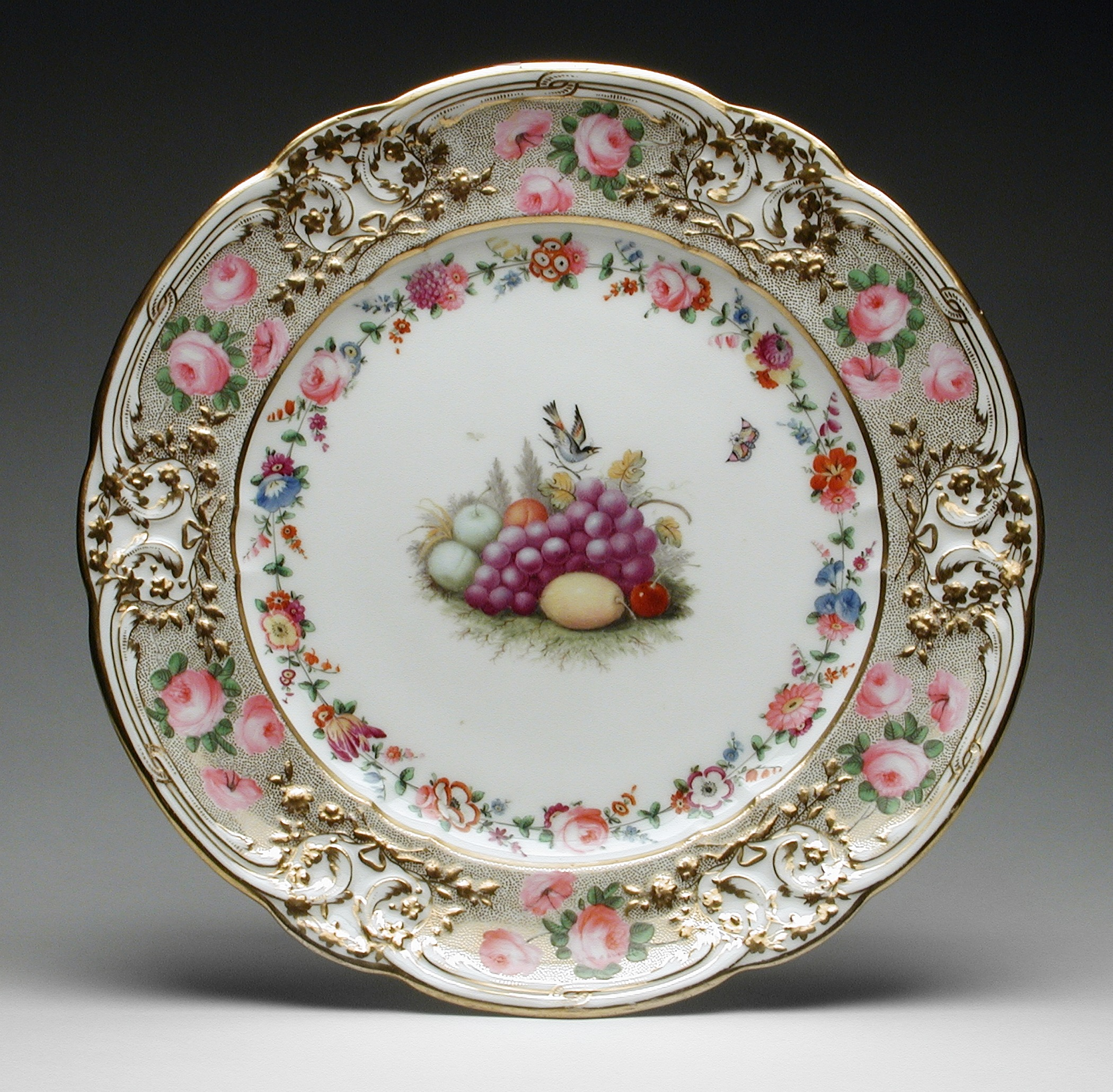
Plate, c. 1820

Billingsley decided to leave Derby in 1795 despite protestations to the owner from Joseph Lygo, their London agent, that he was too valuable to lose, and would carry his style to other factories: "his going into another factory will put them into the way of doing flowers in the same way, which they are at present ignorant of". After staying for 22 years at Derby, he was highly mobile for the remainder of his career. He appears to have moved constantly and worked at a number of different potteries.

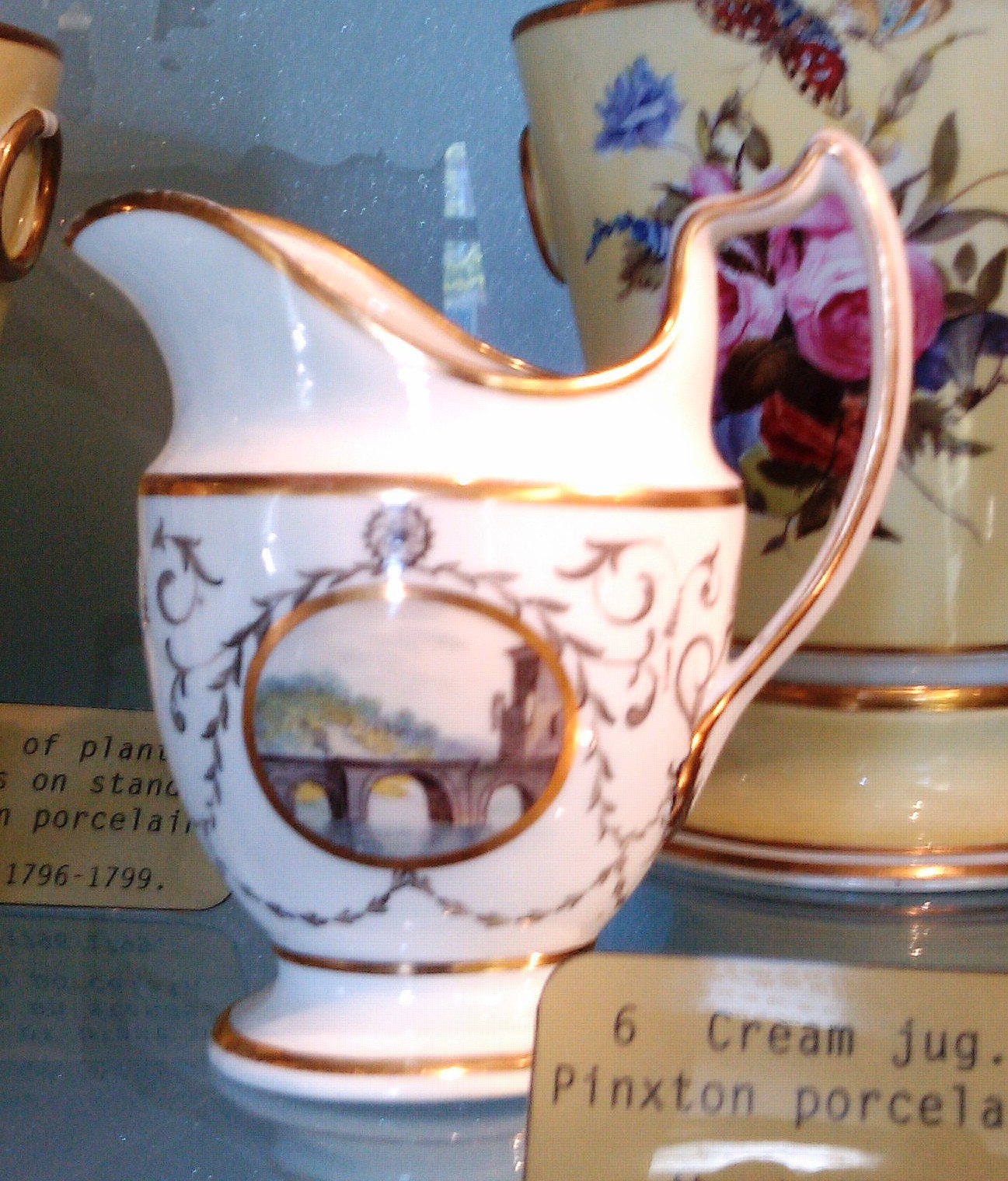
Pinxton Cream Jug, about 1800

First he went to Pinxton, a small village in Derbyshire in October 1795 and superintended the erection of the Pinxton manufactory, with John Coke. He had become interested in improving the formula for soft-paste porcelain, apparently with the intention of exceeding the Sèvres soft-paste in beauty. In this he was swimming against the tide of the period; Spode's improved formula for bone china was taking over most English production, and Sèvres, at this point making both soft and hard-paste porcelain, was to drop the former by 1806.

He stayed at Pinxton until 1799; The factory itself continued until Lady Day 1813, possibly only decorating "blanks" made elsewhere. It was by then under the direction of a local landscape decorator, John Cutts who later obtained employment as a decorator at the Wedgwood factory. Its products are scarce and well sought after commanding good prices. Billingsley's further moves took him to Mansfield, operating only a painting workshop, and about 1802 or 1803 to Torksey, Lincolnshire, where it has been claimed he made porcelain, as also at the neighbouring village of Brampton. It is thought he first came into contact with the potter Samuel Walker there, who later married Billingsley's daughter Sarah in 1812, when the group moved to Worcester porcelain. Another supposed pottery he started, between 1804 and 1808, was at Wirksworth in Derbyshire. Before settling at Worcester, Billingsley approached a number of potteries in search of employment, including the Cambrian Pottery, Swansea, Glamorganshire in 1807.

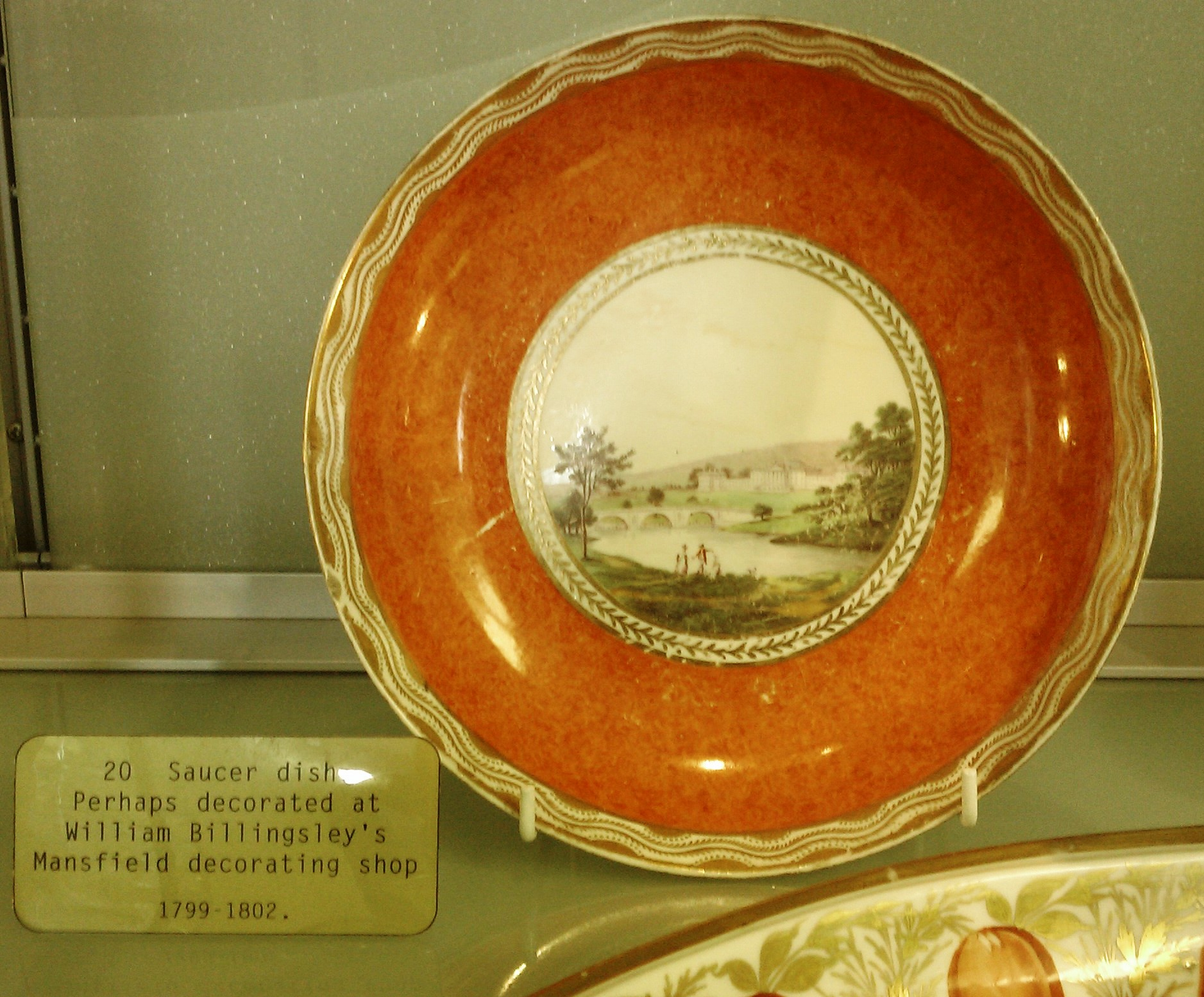
Plate perhaps painted at William Billingsley's decorative workshop in Mansfield

Billingsley started at Royal Worcester in 1808 where he was instrumental in the firm's refinements of its porcelain recipe. While at Royal Worcester under Flight, Barr & Barr, Billingsley signed a contract preventing him from disclosing porcelain recipes, however no clause prohibited him from producing porcelain himself. In 1813 Billingsley took his porcelain recipes and lifetime's experience in the industry, along with his daughters Lavinia, and son-in-law Samuel Walker to Nantgarw, Glamorganshire, Wales, where he established the Nantgarw Pottery.

Nantgarw Pottery was established in November 1813, when Billingsley & Walker leased "Nantgarw House" on the eastern side of the Glamorganshire Canal, eight miles north of Cardiff in the Taff Valley, Glamorganshire, and set about building the kilns and ancillary equipment, in its grounds, necessary to transform the building into a small porcelain pottery.

Billingsley and Walker had brought with them a total of £250 to invest in their project and by January 1814, the Quaker entrepreneur William Weston Young had already become the major share-holder in their venture. It is assumed Young was acquainted with Billingsley through a mutual friend, and fellow earthenware decorator Thomas Pardoe, whom Billingsley had approached at Swansea's Cambrian Pottery, while seeking employment in 1807. Young's work across Glamorganshire as a surveyor may have put him in the position to advise Billingsley, while still at Royal Worcester, of the suitability of the site at Nantgarw.

The pottery was set up, but something of Billingsley & Walker's understanding of the recipe or manufacturing process was amiss, as 90% of the porcelain was ruined in the firing. The resources of the three associates soon ran out, and the group approached the Committee of Trade and Plantations asking for a grant of £500, referring to the subsidy the French Government had given the famous Sèvres Porcelain Factory. They were not successful, but one member of the committee, a porcelain enthusiast; Sir Joseph Banks, suggested to his friend and ceramicist Lewis Weston Dillwyn of the Cambrian Pottery of Swansea, should make an inspection.

Dillwyn made the inspection, and saw the extent of the firm's losses, but was so impressed with the quality of the surviving pieces that he offered Billingsley and Walker use of the Cambrian Pottery to improve their recipe and process. An annex was built for porcelain production at the Cambrian Pottery, where Walker and Billingsley were based from late 1814. The recipe was modified and improved, but was still wasteful enough for Dillwyn to abandon the project and in 1817, Billingsley, his younger daughter Lavinia and Samuel Walker returned to Nantgarw; Sarah, Billingsley's older daughter, Walkers wife, had died in January of that year, sadly, Lavinia also died in September of this year at Nantgarw. Young reinvested in the pottery at Nantgarw, additionally becoming an art teacher at Cowbridge Free School to help raise the funds. Billingsley and Walker continued to fire their porcelain at a loss however until one day in April 1820, while Young was away in Bristol, Billingsley (know locally a Mr Beeley) and Walker absconded to Coalport porcelain leaving behind them the lease to the pottery and several thousand pieces of undecorated porcelain in various stages of production.

Billingsley worked for the Coalport Porcelain Works until his death in 1828. Walker was also employed at the Coalport pottery but later emigrated to America where he established the Temperance Hill Pottery in West Troy, New York.

Billingsley's porcelain pieces are one of the main components of the porcelain collection at Derby Museum and Art Gallery. The Nantgarw pottery has, through the efforts of the "Friends of Nantgarw", established in 1993, been saved for posterity and is now open as a museum with a growing display of porcelain. Although in its early experimental stages, Nantgarw pottery has recently achieved one of its original goals of successfully reproducing porcelain items using Billingsley's soft paste porcelain recipe and will continue to do so into the foreseeable future of the museum.
