= James Hadley (potter) =

English potter and artist (1837–1906)

- Born: August 1837
- Died: 23 December 1903 (aged 66)
- Occupation(s): Potter, artist
- Employer: Worcester Royal Porcelain Company
- Notable work: "Aesthetic Teapot"

James Hadley (August 1837 – 23 December 1903) was an English potter and artist associated with the Worcester Royal Porcelain Company. Until 1895 his work was produced almost exclusively by Royal Worcester; he later set up his own factory.

== Life ==
In the 1850s, Hadley was apprenticed to Kerr and Binns of Worcester, proprietors of the Royal Worcester porcelain factory, where he worked in the modelling department. By 1870 he had become principal modeller there. In 1875, he left the company and set up his own modelling studio in Worcester High Street. Although no longer directly employed by Royal Worcester he sold almost his complete output of models for ornamental vases and figures to them.

He has been described by John Sandon as "probably the finest English modeller of all time" Able to work in any form or style required, he is best known for his decorative figures, made in the 1870s and 1880s, when taste was shifting towards coloured models from the previous fashion for plain white Parian Ware.

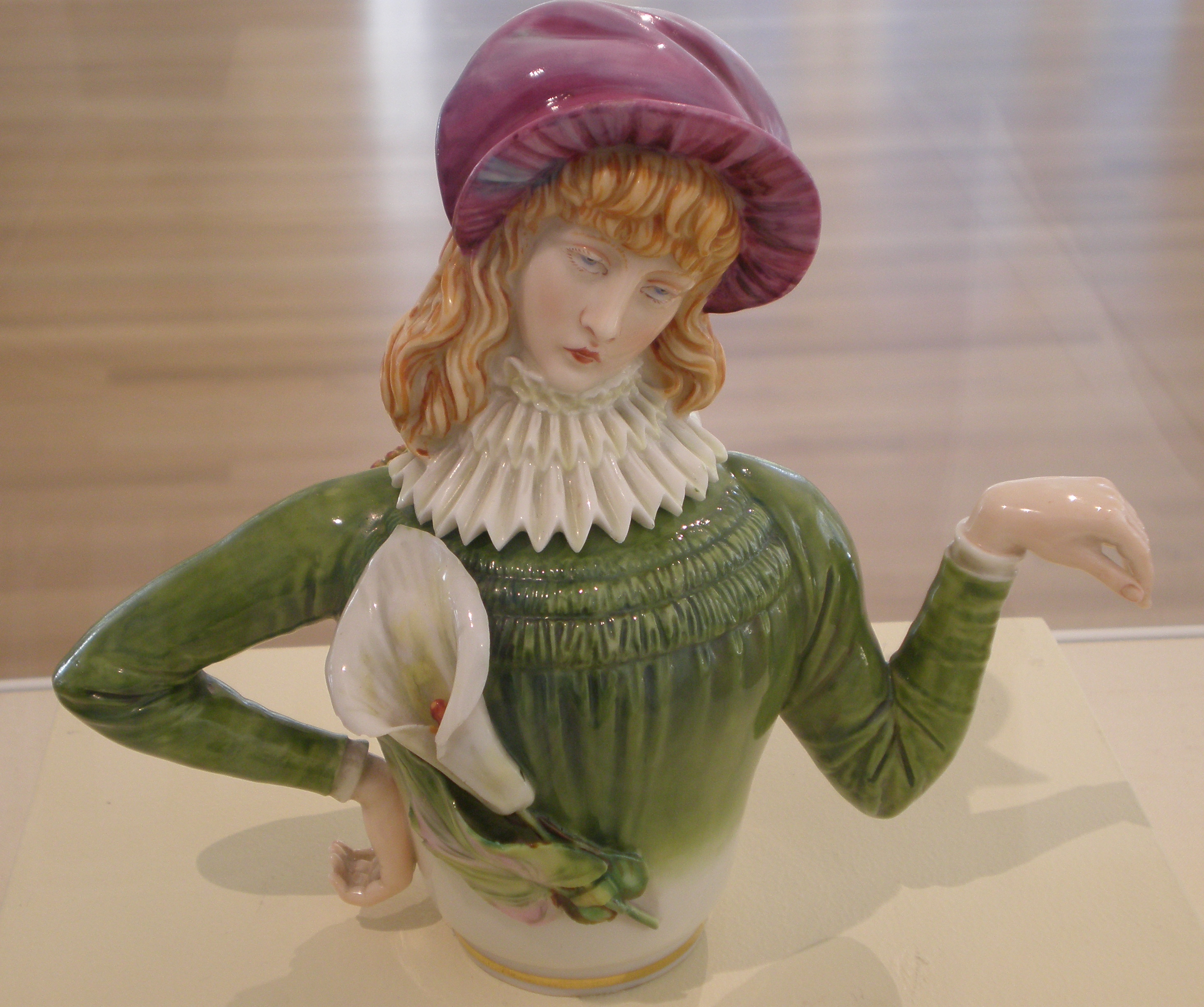
The "Aesthetic Teapot", modelled by Hadley for Royal Worcester.

One of his most famous works was the "Aesthetic Teapot", modelled for Worcester after a design by R.W. Binns. Satirising Oscar Wilde and the aesthetic movement, it is formed as a soulful young man wearing a sunflower on one side, and lovelorn maiden with lily on the other; despite its sculptural form, it still functioned as a teapot.

Hadley's contract to supply models to Royal Worcester was ended in November 1895 due to a decline in the luxury end of the market. For a while he rented some factory space at Shrub Hill, Worcester from Edward Locke, with whom he had worked at Royal Worcester . Then, in 1897, with the support of business partner Frank Littledale, Hadley set up a factory at Diglis Road in the city on land owned by his family. In 1900 Hadley & Sons became a limited company with the shares owned by Hadley and his four sons, and by Frank Littledale.

Hadley died in 1903. In June 1905 Royal Worcester purchased his factory. Production of his wares was transferred to main site in Severn Street, Worcester, the next year.

== Sources ==
- Sandon, John (1993) [1989]. The Philips Guide to English Porcelain of the 18th and 19th Centuries. London: Premier Editions. ISBN 1-897730-02-0.
