= Andrew Nebbett =

British antiques expert

- Born: 1963; England
- Occupation: Antiques expert
- Website: http://www.andrewnebbett.com/

Andrew Nebbett is a 3rd generation antique dealer and specialist in antique interior design solutions. He owns a shop which bears his name in North London. In 2003 Evening Standard magazine listed Nebbett as one of London's top five antique dealers.

Nebbett's grandfather, Albert Porter, was head of the interior design department at Harrods for over 30 years from 1949 to 1985. Porter's most well known commission was the 1965 complete interior design of the house of Brian Epstein, manager of the Beatles.

== Clients ==
Nebbett's regular clients include Jamie Oliver who purchased a 14 ft oak table for his house in Kent, Jamie Theakston, Anouska Hempel, Sean Bean and Guy Ritchie. In 2009 Jeremy Hackett wrote an article profiling Andrew Nebbett Antiques as his favourite shop in London. Cogs from Nebbett's London showroom were featured in the Telegraph Magazine in a profile of the home of Mark Thompson and Anthony Ward.

== Projects ==
Current projects include the making of the counters and cabinets for the new GOYARD London shop, at 116 Mount Street, Mayfair.

Andrew Nebbett Designs provides a range of British handmade clothes rails, zinc & copper tables, Bar-back systems, equestrian saddle racks & bespoke commissions.

== Exhibitions ==
Nebbett has exhibited at Olympia Fine Art and Antiques Fairs, and the Decorative Antiques and Textiles fair in Battersea.
