= Sentinel Valve Works =

British industrial company

Coordinates: 52.1856°N 2.2516°W

Sentinel Valve Works Ltd
- Company type: Ltd
- Industry: Engineering
- Predecessor: Alley & MacLellan
- Founded: 1906
- Fate: Closed
- Headquarters: Worcester
- Products: Valves

The Sentinel Valve Works Ltd was a British company based in Worcester, England, that made medium, large and enormous valves initially for civic clean water distribution and sewage treatment, and later the production of valves for steam heating and electrical generation (steam turbines), and the chemical and petroleum industries. The company traded under the brand name Sentinel Valves.

== History ==
=== Alley & MacLellan, Sentinel Works, Jessie Street Glasgow ===
Alley & MacLellan was founded in 1875 and was based in Polmadie, Glasgow. This company continued in operation until the 1950s. Initially manufacturing valves and compressors for steam engines, and later whole steamships. Their location away from the sea in Glasgow did not help them to be successful in shipbuilding so with the exception of ships in kit form – to be assembled on delivery – they concentrated on component manufacture for the shipbuilding industry.

Design expertise allowed them to expand into other potentially lucrative markets: specifically steam-powered lorries, and valves for civic clean water and sewage systems, both major growth areas in the United Kingdom.

In 1915 Alley & MacLellan moved the steam lorry business to a new company The Sentinel Waggon Works Ltd in Shrewsbury, England allowing the design and production of steam lorries to expand and become successful whilst freeing up space in the Glasgow factory.

=== Expansion to Worcester, 1918 ===
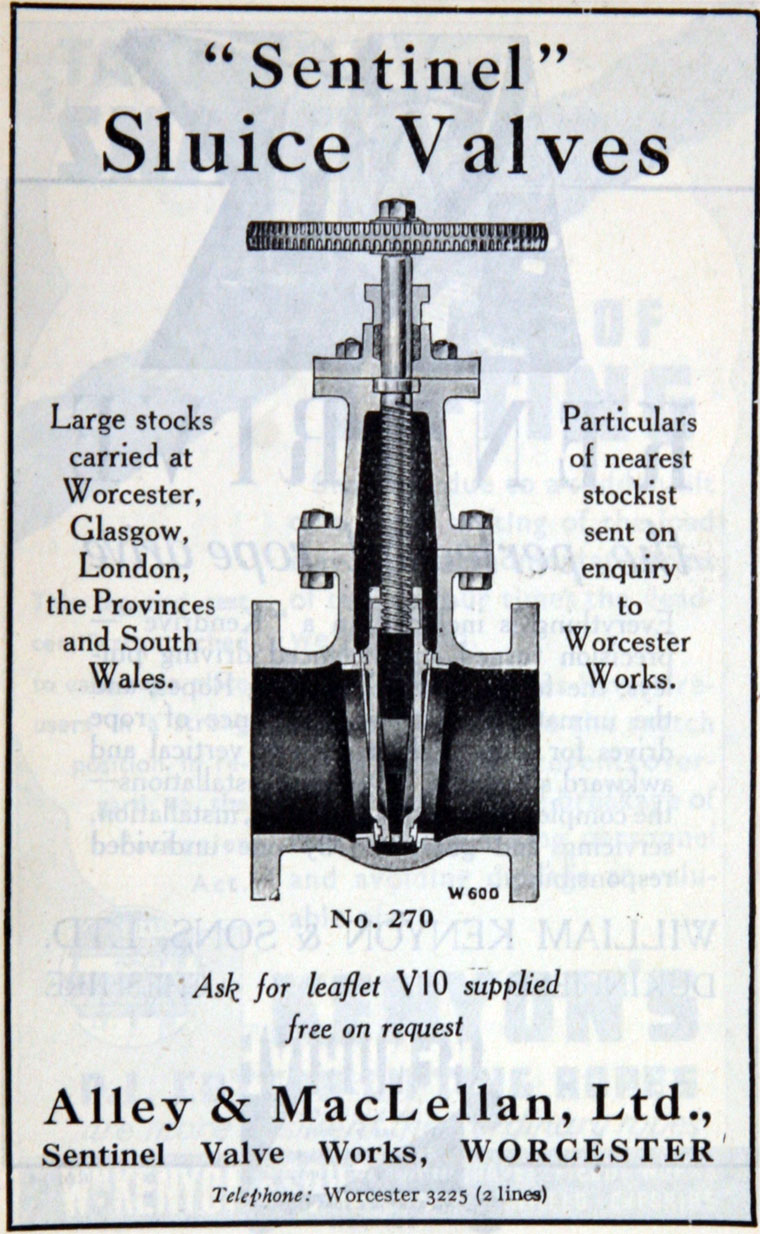
Advert for Alley & MacLellan, 1943

Three years later with the success of the Shrewsbury business, Alley & Maclellan formed a second subsidiary company in 1918, this time based in Worcester England, the aim of this company being to expand the design and manufacture of mechanical valves with the initial focus of new civic clean water and sewage systems.

As with the Shrewsbury factory, a new design and management team was created with a group of around twenty management & technical staff moving from Glasgow to Worcester to expand production, further develop mechanical values and service this new market. In addition the factory created employment for between 300 and 500 local Worcester people.

=== Civic clean water and sewage systems ===
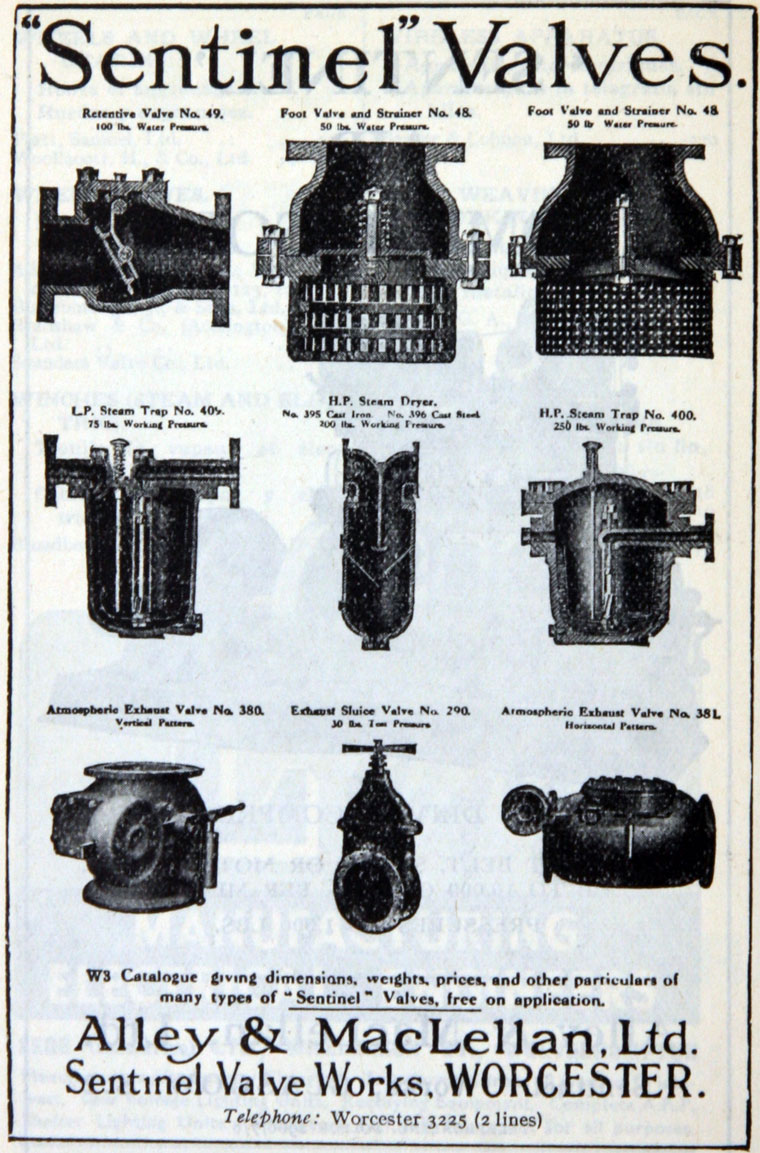
Advert for Alley & MacLellan, 1943

UK Cities such as Worcester were expanding and rebuilding, post war, specifically the replacement of town and city domestic drinking water with clean (safe to drink) piped water and the replacement of Victorian sewage pipes that dumped domestic sewage into rivers with piped sewage removed from dwellings and received by new Sewage treatment plants for cleaning. The Worcester factory was built to provide products for both of these markets in the UK and abroad.

Although the impetus for expansion for this factory was the rapid growth of UK civic clean fresh water and waste sewerage systems, the business designed and manufactured valves of all sizes and for almost every industry, this included heating systems, chemical plants, electricity generation (steam turbines) and the oil mining industry. it also supplied some values to its parent company's ship manufacturing projects.

=== Electrical generation ===
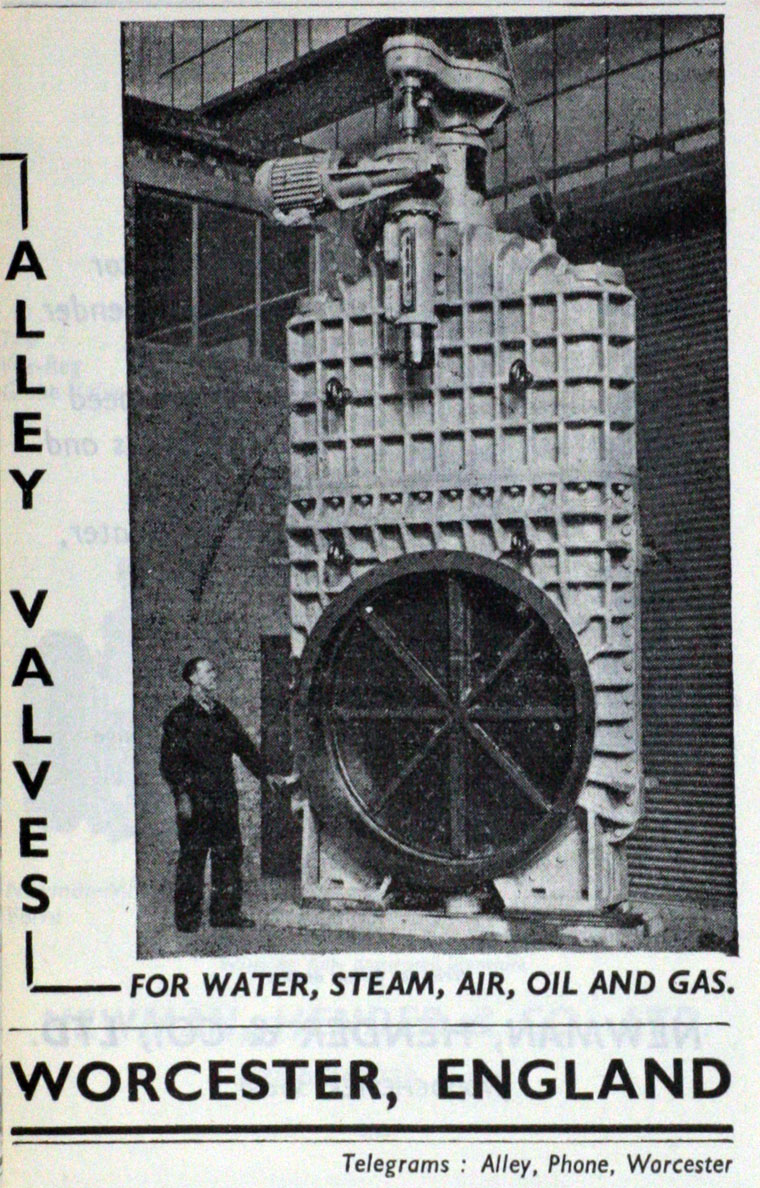
Advert for Alley & MacLellan, 1960

Electrical generation through the use of steam turbines powered by coal became commonplace in the UK in the 1930s with smaller 'town' generation plants being centralised and modernised in the 1950s, again the Worcester factory successfully marketed for steam generation piping valves.

The Worcester company was very successful and the design team was also able to file patents for new unique valve designs and design improvements. As the major business opportunity – civic water systems – once built required little replacement for decades, the company continued to bid for further contracts for towns and cities around the world whilst diversifying into other liquid movement systems.

=== Oil mining industry ===
One area of success, was in a new patented design of capping value for the oil mining industry, designed by chief draftsman Mr D.C. Murray who had transferred from Glasgow, this involved building a ring valve made up of three parts around the top of the drilling pipe, a sliding valve could then be slowly screwed by hand across the vertical flow of oil, capping and containing the pressurized flow until collection pipework was assembled.

=== Other industries ===
The Worcester factory supplied valves for any and every liquid industry including

- 1931 - The Sentinel Valve Works, Worcester supplied oil valves and steam valves to the new Bitumen plant of William Briggs & Sons Ltd., Dundee.

== Legacy ==
The Sentinel name remains an important name in the world of valves with various new, unlinked companies now trading on this name based in the UK, Europe and America. Specifically relief valves that warn of the oper-pressurisation of a system (usually by whistling) are frequently marketed as Sentinel Valves.

== The Worcester factory ==
The factory was of a prefabricated design, manufactured by the Glasgow company and assembled quickly in Bromyard Road, Worcester on the west side of the Worcester to Hereford railway line, this also being the line that was used to deliver the factory from Glasgow. This must have allowed for rapid growth from nothing to a purpose-build factory in a very short period of time.

The factory closed around 1967 with many of the staff transferring to the Mining Engineering Co. Ltd (MECO) factory (later part of Dowty Group) located along the same road.

After the valve works closed, the factory site in Worcester was taken over by Kay & Co Mail Order company who replaced the factory with a large warehouse in 1969. This has also since been demolished and the site was developed into housing in 2014, the road being named Sentinel Close.
