= Royal Worcester =

British ceramics manufacturer

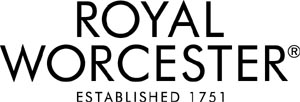
- Type: Private
- Industry: Pottery
- Founded: 1751; 275 years ago
- Headquarters: Stoke-on-Trent, England
- Products: Porcelain ceramics
- Parent: Portmeirion Group
- Website: royalworcester.co.uk

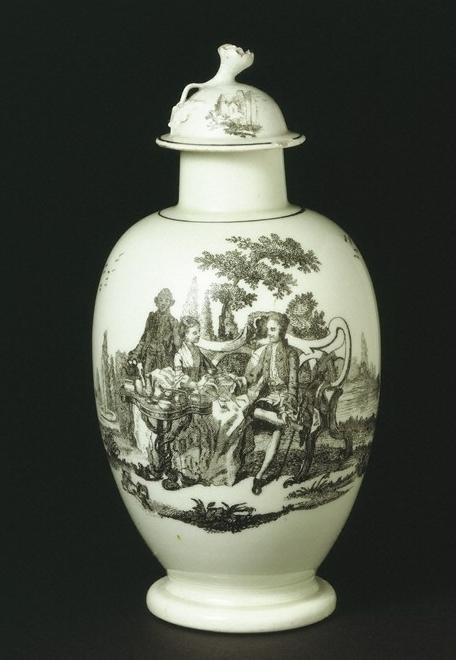
Tea canister, graphic designed by Robert Hancock, about 1768, Worcester porcelain factory (V&A Museum no. 1448&A-1853)

Royal Worcester is a porcelain brand based in Worcester, England. It was established in 1751 and is believed to be the oldest or second oldest remaining English porcelain brand still in existence today, although this is disputed by Royal Crown Derby, which claims 1750 as its year of establishment. Part of the Portmeirion Group since 2009, Royal Worcester remains in the luxury tableware and giftware market, although production in Worcester itself has ended.

The Worcester Royal Porcelain Co. Ltd. (known as Royal Worcester) was formed in 1862, and although the company had a royal warrant of appointment from 1788, wares produced before that time, as well as those produced at two other factories in Worcester, are known as Worcester porcelain. The enterprise has followed the pattern of other leading English porcelain brands, with increasing success during the 18th and 19th centuries, then a gradual decline during the 20th century, especially the latter half.

== Early history ==
Prior to 1751, John Wall, a physician, and William Davis, an apothecary, attempted to develop a method of making porcelain that could then be used to boost prosperity and employment in Worcester. The success of their early experimentation is unknown (the chemical composition of the sherds from the early 1750s confirms that Wall and Davis did manufacture a novel type of porcelain distinct from the later soapstone one), but they clearly came into contact around 1750–1751 with the Bristol porcelain manufactory of Lund and Miller, who were using steatite as a raw material. This appears to have been a unique method for producing porcelain at the time.

In 1751, Wall and Davis persuaded a group of 13 businessmen to invest in a new factory at Warmstry House, Worcester, England, on the banks of the River Severn (the site was leased on 16 May, and the partnership agreement was signed on 4 June), but whether the business plan put forward to the prospective partners was based on the future buy out of Lund's Bristol porcelain factory is uncertain. Wall and Davis secured the sum of £4500 from the partners to establish the factory, known then as "The Worcester Tonquin Manufactory"; the original partnership deeds are still housed in the Museum of Worcester Porcelain.

Richard Holdship, a Quaker and major shareholder, was prominent in the process of the subsequent ‘buy out’ of the Bristol manufactory in early 1752. Holdship personally bought from Benjamin Lund, a fellow Quaker, the soaprock licence that ensured the mining of 20 tons p.a. of soaprock from Cornwall.

The early wares were soft-paste porcelain with bodies that contained soaprock, commonly called in most ceramic circles as soapstone. The chemical analyses of these wares closely correlates to those of the Bristol manufactory. This places Worcester in a group of early English potteries including Caughley and factories in Liverpool.

== The Flight and Barr partnerships ==
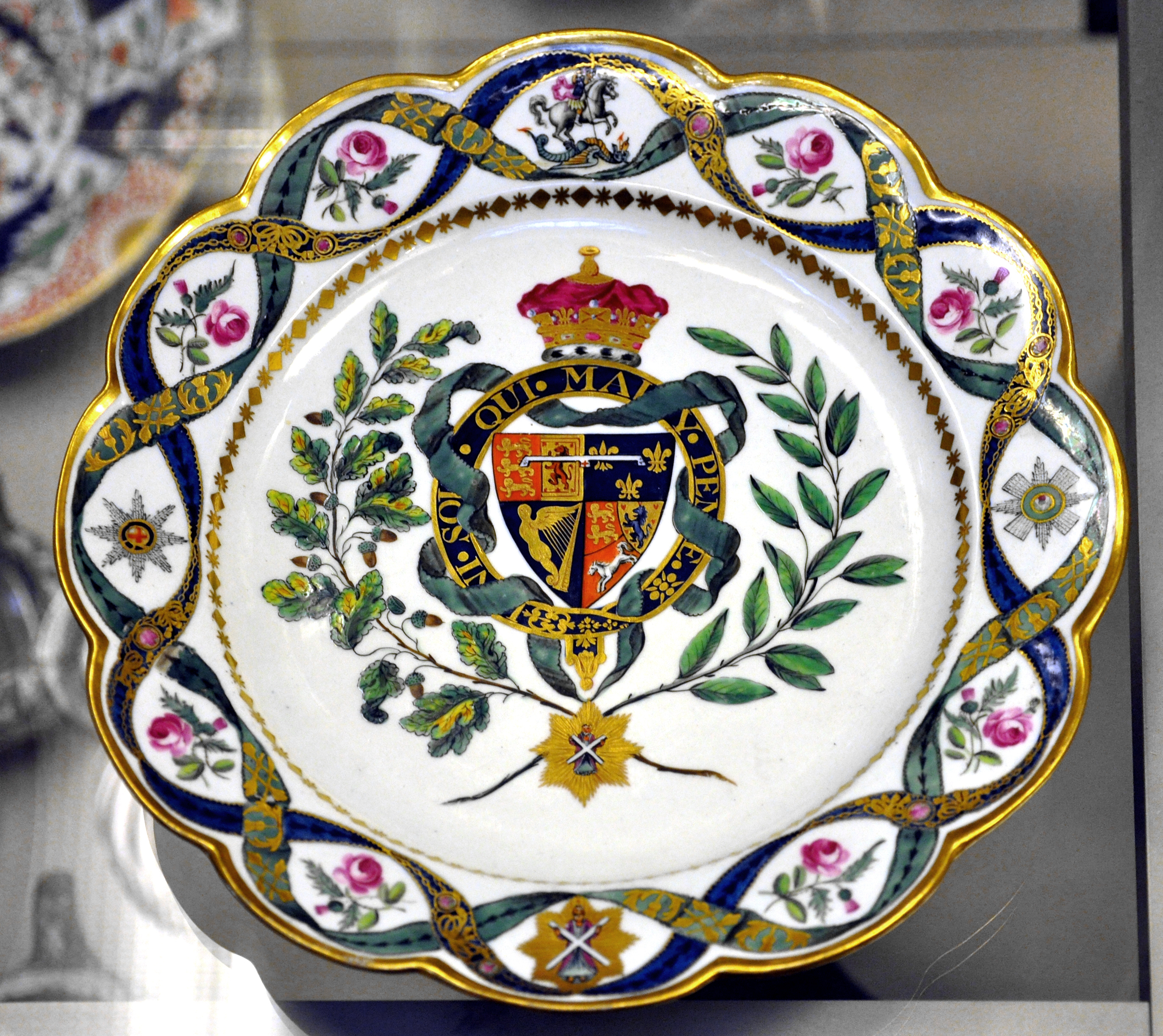
Soft-paste armorial porcelain plate with the coat of arms of the Duke of Clarence, future William IV, 1789, Flight factory, Diameter: 9.7 inches

In 1783, the factory was purchased by Thomas Flight—the former London sales agent for the concern—for £3,000. He let his two sons run the concern, with John Flight taking the lead role till his death in 1791. In 1788 George III, following a visit to the company, granted it a royal warrant, and it became known as the "Royal Porcelain Works". Knowledge of this period is largely a result of the excellent diary that John Flight kept from 1785 to 1791. This is discussed in detail in Appendix III of Flight & Barr Worcester Porcelain by Henry Sandon.

During this period, the factory was in poor repair. Production was limited to low-end patterns of mostly Blue and White porcelains after Chinese porcelain designs of the period. It was also pressured by competition from inexpensive Chinese export porcelain, and from Thomas Turner's Caughley (pronounced "Calf-ley") Factory. Martin Barr joined the firm as a partner in 1792; porcelains of this period are often identified by an incised capital "B" and, later, by more elaborate printed and impressed marks.

Thomas Flight died in 1800, leaving the factory in the hands of his son Joseph Flight and Martin Barr. Barr's sons Martin Barr Jr. and George Barr were being prepared at that time to run the factory. In addition to the warrant granted by George III, royal warrants were also issued by the Prince of Wales in 1807, and the Princess of Wales in 1808.

During the Flight and Barr period the factories under a variety of company names produced the soapstone porcelain. At first popular due to its resistance to thermal shock, this type of porcelain got out of favour in the middle of 1790s once the bone china was invented. While much of their competition changed to the new recipes, Flight and Barr continued with their original formulation until merging with Chamberlain in 1840.

== Chamberlain and Grainger factories ==
"Worcester porcelain" also includes the hard-paste porcelain wares made in Chamberlain's Factory and Grainger's Factory, as they tend to be referred to in catalogues and museum descriptions. Both of these began as decorating shops in Worcester, painting "blanks" made by other factories, but after a few years began to make their own porcelain. Chamberlain's Factory, which was very high quality and in 1811 received its own royal warrant from the Prince Regent, had begun to manufacture by 1791. In 1840, at a time when both businesses were having difficulties keeping up with a changing market, it merged with the main Flight and Barr concern as "Chamberlain & Company.

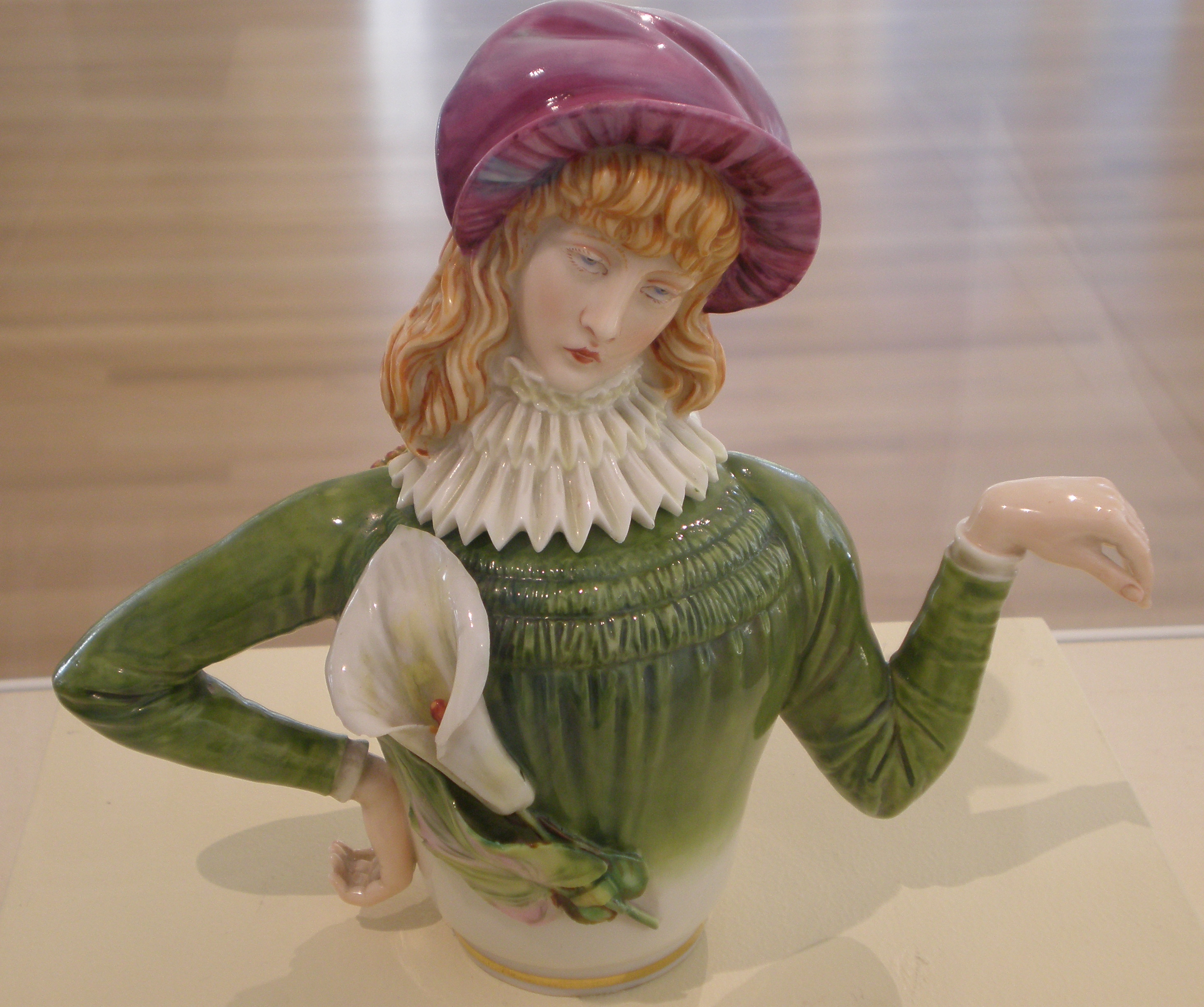
Female side of Aesthetic teapot designed by R. W. Binns and modeled by James Hadley, 1881.

A rebuilding after a fire in early 1850s was overseen by new owners, William Henry Kerr and Richard William Binns. The Worcester Royal Porcelain Company Limited was formed in 1862 after Kerr's retirement (Binns partnered with Edward Philips).

Grainger's Factory was making porcelain from 1807, though not of quite the highest quality. Under a succession of partnership and company names the Grainger family retained significant shares until the death of the last member in 1889, when Royal Worcester took them over. As Grainger & Co the factory and name were used until 1902, when a full transfer to the main factory took place. Some Grainger moulds remained in use in the 21st century. The factory site at St Martin’s Gate was used from 1809 to 1902.

In 1905 Royal Worcester acquired the factory of James Hadley and Sons. Hadley used to work for Royal Worcester in 1850s-1870s, but set up his own manufacturing facility on Diglis Road in 1897.

== Worcester Porcelain Museum ==
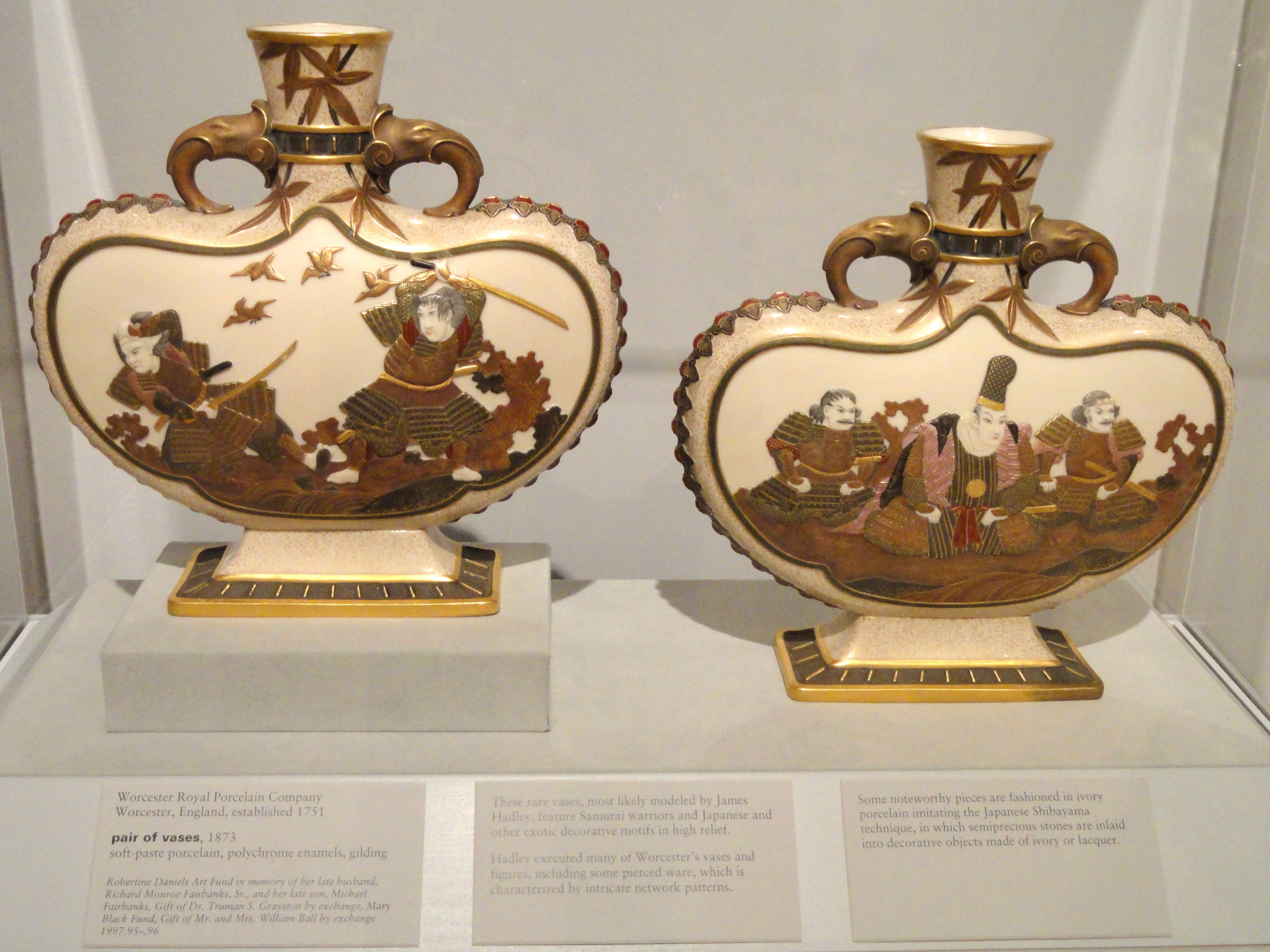
Pair of "japonist" vases, 1873 (Indianapolis Museum of Art)

The factory's former site includes the independent Museum of Royal Worcester (formerly known as the 'Dyson Perrins Museum' and 'Worcester Porcelain Museum') owned by the Dyson Perrins Museum Trust. The Museum houses the world’s largest collection of Worcester porcelain. The collections date back to 1751 and the Victorian gallery, the ceramic collections, archives and records of factory production, form the primary resource for the study of Worcester porcelain and its history.

== Porcelain painters ==
Artists and designers who worked for the factory included Thomas Baxter, William Billingsley, John Stinton, David Bates, James Hadley, Christopher Dresser, Charles Baldwin, Harry Davis and Peter Ewence. A number of Royal Worcester fruit painters from the late 19th century onwards are known to collectors.

== Modern history ==
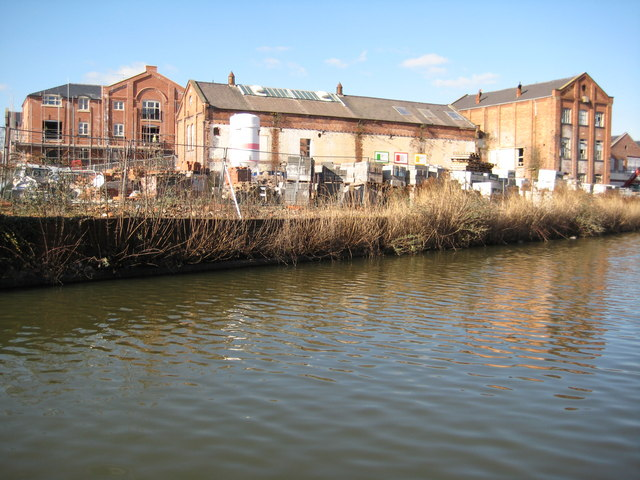
Site of Worcester Porcelain Works - geograph.org.uk - 1744254

In the 20th century, Royal Worcester's most popular pattern has been "Evesham Gold", first offered in 1961, depicting the autumnal fruits of the Vale of Evesham with fine gold banding on an "oven to table" body.

After the 1976 merger with Spode, and due to heavy competition from overseas, the production was switched to factories in Stoke and abroad. 100 staff were made redundant in 2003, and another 100 went in 2005. Fifteen porcelain painters left the Severn Street factory on Friday 29 September 2006, together with 100 other workers. The last trading date for Royal Worcester was 14 June 2009.

The company went into administration on 6 November 2008 and on 23 April 2009, the brand name and intellectual property were acquired by Portmeirion Pottery Group – a pottery and homewares company based in Stoke-on-Trent. As Portmeirion Group already had a factory in Stoke-on-Trent, the purchase did not include the Royal Worcester and Spode manufacturing facilities.
