= List of museums in Worcestershire =

This list of museums in Worcestershire, England contains museums which are defined for this context as institutions (including nonprofit organizations, government entities, and private businesses) that collect and care for objects of cultural, artistic, scientific, or historical interest and make their collections or related exhibits available for public viewing. Also included are non-profit art galleries and university art galleries. Virtual museums are not included in this list.

== Museums ==
Name	Image	Town/City	Region	Type	Summary
Almonry Museum and Heritage Centre		Evesham	Wychavon	Local	local history, rural life, agriculture, trades and social history displays in a 14th-century building was once home to the almoner of Evesham Abbey
Avoncroft Museum of Historic Buildings		Stoke Heath	Bromsgrove	Open air	Over 25 historic buildings and structures moved from other locations, including houses, a windmill, church, barn, stable, collection of telephone kiosks
Bewdley Museum		Bewdley	Wyre Forest	Multiple	local and social history, town jail, World War II air raid shelter, 18th century brass foundry exhibit, art exhibits, demonstrations of historic crafts and trades
Bredon Barn		Bredon	Wychavon	Historic site	operated by the National Trust, 14th century barn made from stone
Broadway Museum & Art Gallery		Broadway	Wychavon	Local	Set in a 17th-century Coaching Inn, displays on Broadway History, Wool History, Coaching History, with exhibitions from the Ashmolean Museum Oxford, and temporary art exhibitions
Churchill Forge Mill		Churchill	Wyre Forest	Industry	Water-powered forge mill used to produce metal tools, open on select days
Commandery		Worcester	Worcester	History	Displays on English history and the historic building during different eras, including medieval, Tudor, Civil War, Georgian, Victorian and 1950s eras
Croome Park		Besford	Wychavon	Historic house	Operated by the National Trust, unfurnished Croome Court manor house designed by Capability Brown and Robert Adam, landscaped park by Brown
Droitwich Spa Heritage Centre		Droitwich Spa	Wychavon	Local	information, local history and visitor centre, salt industry, Droitwich transmitting station
Elgar Birthplace Museum		Lower Broadheath	Malvern Hills	Historic house	19th century period birthplace and home of composer Edward Elgar
Forge Mill Needle Museum		Redditch	Redditch	Industry	Heritage of the needle and fishing tackle industries
George Marshall Medical Museum		Worcester	Worcester	Medical	history and artifacts about the development of medical care, reconstructed apothecary shop and operating theatre, death masks from prisoners executed by hanging
Gordon Russell Museum		Broadway	Wychavon	Art	work of the 20th century furniture maker Sir Gordon Russell MC, includes furniture and designs
The Greyfriars		Worcester	Worcester	Historic house	operated by the National Trust, timber-framed 14th house with early 17th- and 18th-century additions, collection of textiles
Hagley Hall		Hagley	Bromsgrove	Historic house	18th-century house with state rooms, collection of 18th-century Chippendale furniture and family portraits
Hanbury Hall		Hanbury	Wychavon	Historic house	Operated by the National Trust, early 18th century William and Mary-style house and gardens
Harvington Hall		Chaddesley Corbett	Wyre Forest	Historic house	Moated medieval and Elizabethan manor house
The Infirmary		Worcester	City of Worcester	Medical Museum	Interactive exhibition at the University of Worcester’s City Campus combining history, science, art and technology to explore the medical stories of one of England's oldest infirmaries.
Kidderminster Railway Museum		Kidderminster	Wyre Forest	Railway	railway artifacts
Little Malvern Court		Little Malvern	Malvern Hills	Historic house	15th century prior's hall, monk's cells and other rooms of the Benedictine monastery, collection of vestments, embroideries and paintings
Madresfield Court		Madresfield	Malvern Hills	Historic house	Moated manor house reflecting several centuries of ownership, distinguished collections of furniture, art, and porcelain, visits by appointment
Malvern Museum		Malvern	Malvern Hills	Local	Local history in period room displays
Middle Littleton Tythe Barn		Middle Littleton	Wychavon	Historic site	operated by the National Trust, 13th century tithe barn
Military Wireless Museum in the Midlands	MWM	Kidderminster	Wyre Forest	Military	Collection of military wireless communications equipment from around the world
Morgan Motor Company		Malvern Link	Malvern Hills	Transportation	Factory tours and museum with vehicles, company's history, developments in technology
Pershore Heritage Centre		Pershore	Wychavon	Local	local and social history
Stourport Canal Basins		Stourport-on-Severn	Wyre Forest	Transportation	heritage rooms feature artifacts and exhibits about the basins of the Staffordshire and Worcestershire Canal
Tenbury Museum		Tenbury Wells	Malvern Hills	Local	Local history
Transport Museum, Wythall		Wythall	Bromsgrove	Transportation	Buses, battery electric vehicles, a miniature steam railway, memorabilia
Tudor House Heritage Centre		Worcester	Worcester	History	timber-framed Tudor house with historic artifacts reflecting its use in different ages, local social history, formerly the Museum of Local Life
Tudor House Museum		Upton-upon-Severn	Malvern Hills	Local	, local history
Worcester City Art Gallery & Museum		Worcester	Worcester	Multiple	art, local history, natural history, geology, archaeology, social history, period chemist's shop, collections of the Worcestershire Regiment and Worcestershire Yeomanry Cavalry
Worcester Porcelain Museum		Worcester	Worcester	Art	Formerly known as the Dyson Perrins Museum, collection of Royal Worcester porcelain
Worcestershire County Museum at Hartlebury Castle		Stourport-on-Severn	Wyre Forest	Multiple	Local history, period rooms, toys, archaeology, costumes, local crafts, local industry and transportation, area geology and natural history, transport vehicles
Worcestershire Masonic Library & Museum		Worcester	Worcester	Masonic	Masonic medals, jewels, regalia, ceramics, medals, coins, books, photographs and memorabilia

== Defunct museums ==
- Bromsgrove Museum, Bromsgrove
- Museum of Carpet, Kidderminster - history of local carpet-making industry

== See also ==
- Category:Tourist attractions in Worcestershire
