= OSD =

OSD may refer to:

== Science and medicine ==
- Ocean Science Discussions, the discussion and review section of the journal Ocean Science
- Optimal shape design, a part of the field of optimal control theory
- Oral sedation dentistry, the oral administration of sedatives to facilitate dental procedures
- Oral solid dose, a form of oral administration of medication
- Osgood–Schlatter disease, an inflammation of the growth plate at the tibial tuberosity which occurs mostly in teenage boys

== Technology and computing ==
- Object storage device, computer data storage device that manages data as objects
- Online standards development, platform for the development of standards of the International Electrotechnical Commission
- On-screen display, a feature of visual devices like VCRs and DVD players that displays program, position, and setting data on a connected TV or computer display
- Open Source Definition, criteria used by the Open Source Initiative to determine whether or not a software license can be considered open source
- OpenSearch Description document, an XML file format that identifies and describes a search engine
- Operating System Deployment, a component of Microsoft's System Center Configuration Manager product
- Orthotropic steel deck, a roofing and bridging technique

== Other uses ==
- Åre Östersund Airport, Sweden, IATA airport code
- Office of the Secretary of Defense, the principal staff of the United States Secretary of Defense
- Officer on Special Duty, a Bangladeshi, Indian, and Pakistani civil service officer
- Oklahoma School for the Deaf, a K-12 residential school for the deaf or hard-hearing students
- Olympia School District, a school district in Olympia, Washington
- One Shot Deal, a live album by Frank Zappa posthumously released in 2008
- Oregon School for the Deaf
- Overseas Surveys Directorate, the United Kingdom's central survey and mapping organisation for British colonies and protectorates 1984–1991
- Oxnard Elementary School District, a school district in Oxnard, California
