= Sedation =

Reduction of irritability or agitation by administration of sedative drugs

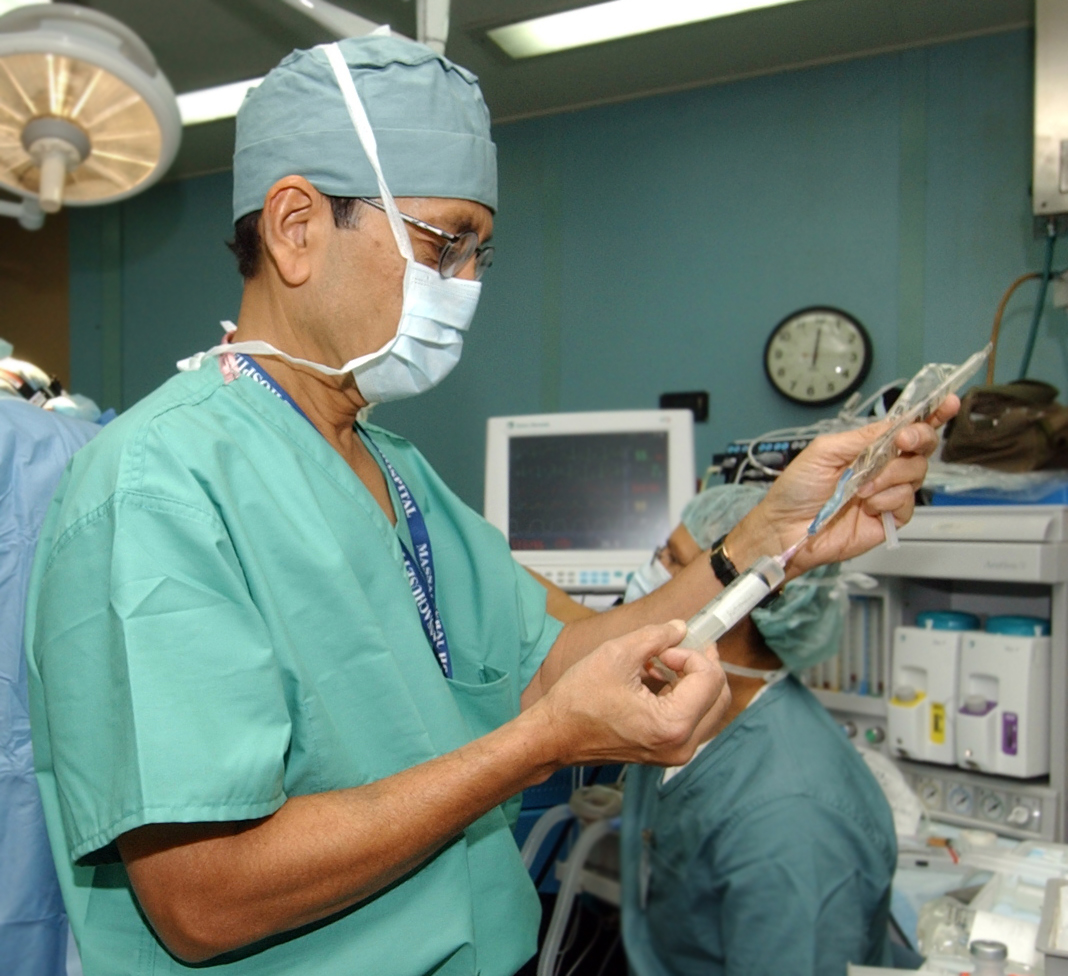
Anesthetist

Sedation is the reduction of irritability or agitation by administration of sedative drugs, generally to facilitate a medical procedure or diagnostic procedure. Examples of drugs which can be used for sedation include isoflurane, diethyl ether, propofol, etomidate, ketamine, pentobarbital, lorazepam and midazolam.

== Medical uses ==
Sedation is typically used in minor surgical procedures such as endoscopy, vasectomy, or dentistry and for reconstructive surgery, some cosmetic surgeries, removal of wisdom teeth, or for high-anxiety patients. Sedation methods in dentistry include inhalation sedation (using nitrous oxide), oral sedation, and intravenous (IV) sedation. Inhalation sedation is also sometimes referred to as "relative analgesia".

Sedation is also used extensively in the intensive care unit so that patients who are being ventilated tolerate having an endotracheal tube in their trachea. It can also be used during a long term brain EEG to help patient relax.

== Risks ==
There are studies claiming that sedation accounts for 40 percent to 50 percent procedure-related complications. Airway obstruction, apnea, and hypotension are not uncommon during sedation and require the presence of health professionals who are suitably trained to detect and manage these problems. Aside from the respiratory depression, risks also include unintended levels of sedation, postoperative somnolence, aspiration, and adverse reactions to sedation medications. Complications could also include perforation, bleeding, and the stimulation of vasovagal reflexes. To avoid sedation risks, care providers conduct a thorough pre-sedation evaluation and this process includes pre-sedation history and physicals with emphasis on the determining characteristics that indicate potential risks to the patient and potential difficult airway management. This process can also reveal if the sedation period needs to be prolonged or additional therapeutic procedures are required.

== Levels of sedation ==
Sedation scales are used in medical situations in conjunction with a medical history in assessing the applicable degree of sedation in patients in order to avoid under-sedation (the patient risks experiencing pain or distress) and over-sedation (the patient risks side effects such as suppression of breathing, which might lead to death).

Examples of sedation scales include MSAT (Minnesota Sedation Assessment Tool), UMSS (University of Michigan Sedation Scale), the Ramsay Scale (Ramsay, et al. 1974) and the RASS (Richmond Agitation-Sedation Scale).

The American Society of Anesthesiologists defines the continuum of sedation as follows:

- Minimal sedation – normal response to verbal stimuli.
- Moderate sedation – purposeful response to verbal/tactile stimulation. (This is usually referred to as "conscious sedation")
- Deep sedation – purposeful response to repeated or painful stimulation.
- General anesthesia – unarousable even with painful stimulus.

In the United Kingdom, deep sedation is considered to be a part of the spectrum of general anesthesia, as opposed to conscious sedation.

In addition to the aforementioned precautions, patients should be interviewed to determine if they have any other condition that may lead to complications while undergoing treatment. Any head, neck, or spinal cord injuries are noted as well as any diagnosis of osteoporosis.

== Intravenous sedation ==
The most common standard conscious sedation technique for adults is intravenous sedation using Midazolam.

Indications:

- Reduced dental anxiety and phobia
- Traumatic or prolonged dental procedures
- Patients with gag reflex
- Medical conditions potentially aggravated by the stress of dental treatment
- Special care (mild intellectual or physical disability)
- Some disorders involving its spasticity due to its muscle relaxant properties

Contraindications:

- Uncooperative patient
- Psychologically immature individuals
- Patients unable to provide a suitable escort
- Difficult oral surgery or prolonged surgical procedure
- Muscle diseases or diseases which cause muscle wastage
- ASA III or above
- Allergy or hypersensitivity to benzodiazepines
- Pregnancy and breast feeding
- History of psychiatric disorders
- Kidney or liver dysfunction
- Acute pulmonary insufficiency
- Preexisting respiratory conditions as patients are susceptible to respiratory depression
- Alcohol or drug addiction
- Lack of visible superficial veins

== Sedation for pediatric patients ==
Present drugs commonly used to sedate children: Methohexital; Thiopental; Benzodiazepines; Diazepam; Midazolam; Ketamine; Opioids; Morphine; Meperidine; Fentanyl.

Whenever it is necessary to sedate a child, one must consider the type of procedure planned (painful or nonpainful), the duration of the procedure (important in choosing the appropriate sedative), the underlying medical condition of the patient (proper fasting, contracted blood volume, interaction with other medications, and intact mechanisms of drug elimination), the need for anxiolysis or narcosis, and experience with alternative techniques or routes of administration.

A child undergoing a procedure that is nonpainful (e.g., CT scan or small laceration infiltrated with local anesthetic) does not require a narcotic. Conversely, a child undergoing a painful procedure may require an opioid.

== See also ==
- Palliative sedation
- Procedural sedation
- Sedoanalgesia
- Twilight anesthesia
