= Oral sedation dentistry =

Oral sedation dentistry is a medical procedure involving the administration of sedative drugs via an oral route, generally to facilitate a dental procedure and reduce patients anxiety related to the experience. Oral sedation is one of the available methods of conscious sedation dentistry, along with inhalation sedation (e.g., nitrous oxide) and conscious intravenous sedation. Benzodiazepines are commonly used, specifically triazolam. Triazolam is commonly selected for its rapid onset and limited duration of effect. An initial dose is usually taken approximately one hour before the dental appointment. Treatment may include additional dosing on the night proceeding the procedure, to mitigate anxiety-related insomnia. The procedure is generally recognized as safe, with the effective dosages being below levels sufficient to impair breathing.

== Uses ==
Dental patients with generalized anxiety, belonephobia (fear of needles and sharp instruments), prior dental trauma, or generalized fear of the dentist can take oral medication in order to reduce their anxieties. A variety of single and incremental dose protocols are used to medicate the patient as early as the day before treatment. Medication additionally helps reduce memory or the sights and smells of the dental office to avoid recall of any trauma. The sedative effect allows more dentistry to be completed in fewer appointments as well as allowing complex procedures to be performed in less time.

== Drugs ==
- Valium (Diazepam) is the most widely recognized drug in the group. It has been around since the 1960s and is a well known and time-tested sedative with amnesic properties. Valium has a longer half-life than some of the other medications, so it is particularly useful for appointments where extensive dentistry is being performed.
- Halcion (Triazolam) is most well known for the treatment of insomnia. It is highly effective when used in oral sedation protocols, and if deemed appropriate by your dentist, can be used in conjunction with an antihistamine.
- Sonata (Zaleplon) is similar to Halcion in that it is also commonly used for the treatment of insomnia.
- Ativan (Lorazepam) is commonly prescribed for the treatment of anxiety. It possesses many of the desirable effects of other benzodiazepines with amnesic properties. It is an effective sedative with a medium length half-life and is useful for appointments that are longer than two hours.
- Vistaril (Hydroxyzine) while classified as an antihistamine has also been shown to have anxiolytic (anti-anxiety) effects. It also works in conjunction with many of the benzodiazepines but has no amnesic properties.
- Versed (Midazolam) has the shortest half-life of all of the benzodiazepines, lasting about an hour, and making it ideal for short appointments or simple procedures. It has many of the same anxiolytic and amnesic benefits of other benzodiazepines, but is less commonly used because of its duration.

== Risk mitigation ==
Drug characteristics must be carefully considered when choosing the appropriate medication. Matching factors, such as where the drug is metabolized and any underlying diseases requires a good medical history and thorough knowledge of the drug's characteristics. All risk factors, individual characteristics, and procedural complexities can be taken into account in order to provide the best drug choice.

== Education ==
Courses in Oral Sedation Dentistry are offered across North America at various dental schools and private organizations. The largest for-profit provider of dental sedation continuing education in North America is the Dental Organization for Conscious Sedation. Specialty courses are being taught in pediatric sedation, ACLS, IV Sedation and emergency preparedness. The largest not-for-profit organization that provides educational courses in oral sedation as well as IV sedation and general anesthesia is the American Dental Society of Anesthesiology.

== Regulation ==
Education and training requirements to administer sedation vary by state. The ADA has set forth general sedation guidelines that have been adopted or modified by many states. There are typically dosing limitations involved with anxiolysis, usually a single dose the day of treatment not to exceed the maximum recommended dose (MRD) of the medication in order to achieve the intended level of sedation. However, these sedation laws vary from state to state. Anxiolysis protocols are designed to treat healthy ASA I & II patients ages 18 and up for one to four hours of treatment. Some states now require a permit even for nitrous oxide administration and/or anxiolysis.

== Advantages ==
The main advantages of oral sedation versus other sedation methods are:

- Ease of administration (you only have to take a pill)
- Effectiveness
- No needles involved
- High patient acceptance
- Amnesic effect
- Lower cost vs intravenous sedation

== See also ==
- Sedation dentistry
