= Museum of Royal Worcester =

Ceramics museum in Worcester, England

Coordinates: 52.1873°N 2.2190°W

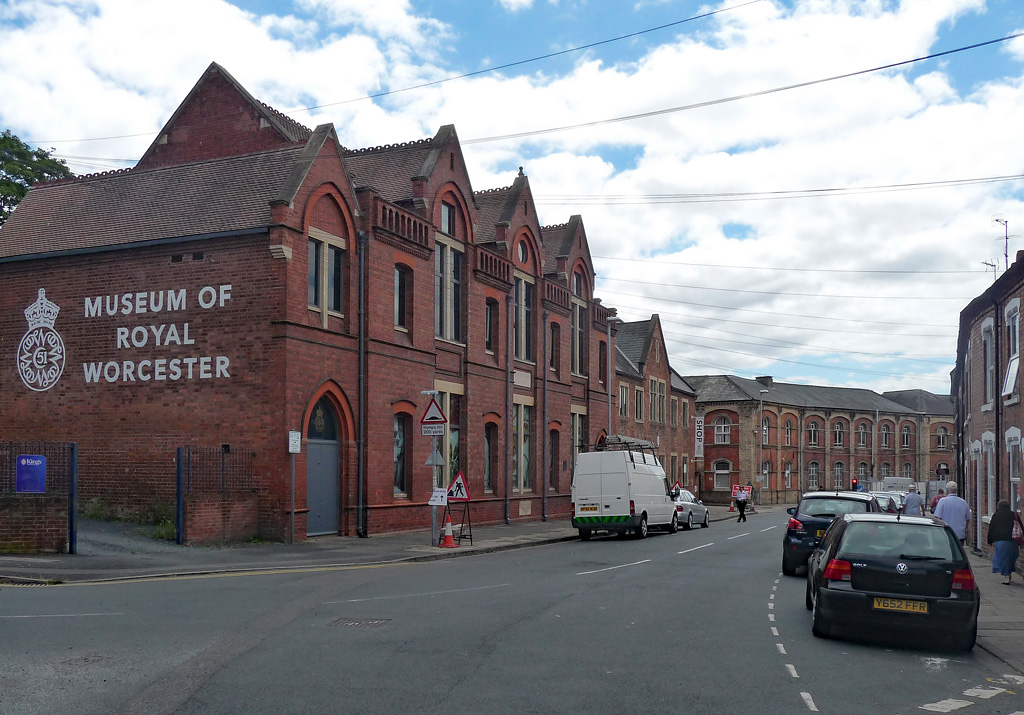
View of the museum building in Severn Street, Worcester, England

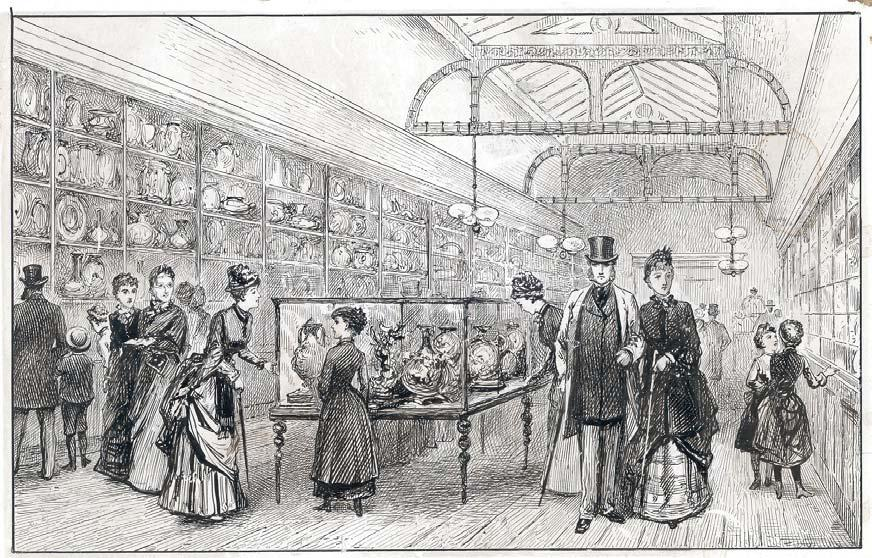
The Royal Worcester factory museum in the 19th century

The Museum of Royal Worcester (formerly Worcester Porcelain Museum and Dyson Perrins Museum) is a ceramics museum located in the Royal Worcester porcelain factory's former site in Worcester, England.

== Overview ==
The museum houses the world’s largest collection of Worcester porcelain. The collections date back to 1751 and the Victorian gallery, the ceramic collections, archives, and records of factory production, form the primary resource for the study of Worcester porcelain and its history.

The museum is the only part of Royal Worcester left at the Severn Street site in Worcester after the factory went into administration in 2008 and closed in 2009. The Royal Worcester Visitor Centre, the seconds shop, and the café all closed with the factory in 2009.

The Museum of Royal Worcester was formerly known as the Museum of Worcester Porcelain and the Dyson Perrins Museum and Worcester Porcelain Museum, after Charles William Dyson Perrins of Worcestershire sauce fame. The collections includes pieces from the beginning of porcelain manufacturing in Worcester in 1751 until the closure of the Royal Worcester factory in Worcester. The museum is owned by the Dyson Perrins Museum Trust.

== Collections ==
The Worcester Porcelain Museum collection is displayed in three permanent galleries: the Georgian Gallery, the Victorian Gallery, and the Twentieth Century Gallery. The museum holds over 10,000 objects made between 1751 and 2009. The collections date back to the 18th century, when shapes and patterns were copied from the Far East for use in the homes of the very rich.

A display in the first gallery shows an 18th-century furnished room with a long case clock and table laid for dessert. A trio of hexagonal vases feature on the mantle piece in what would have been a gentleman's home.

In contrast, the Victorian gallery has deep colours, extravagant exhibition pieces, and works of great craftsmanship. Here it can be seen how travel influenced design and how with the onslaught of the Industrial Revolution more people could afford to buy fine works.

The museum tour ends in the 20th century, where as well as producing bespoke services, commissioned by some of the factory's private customers, changing lifestyles and the advent of modern appliances like freezers and microwave ovens required a new range of products.

Henry Sandon and Lars Tharp together with others worked on an audio tour for the museum. This together with the facts trail combines to set the historical backdrop and present the technical achievements, the workers who made and decorated the porcelain, and the customers who bought it.

== Facilities ==
Disability and access

The Museum of Royal Worcester has full wheelchair access throughout the galleries, two lifts and a disabled toilet. Wheelchairs are available for use at the museum. Three hour street parking is available in Severn Street outside the museum for those with a blue badge.

Functions and hire

The museum holds a range of events each year and is also available for private and corporate hire for conferences, dinner parties, wedding receptions, etc.

There is also a Friends society with members from around the world.

== See also ==
- List of museums in Worcestershire
