= Worcester City Art Gallery & Museum =

Art gallery and local museum in Worcester, England

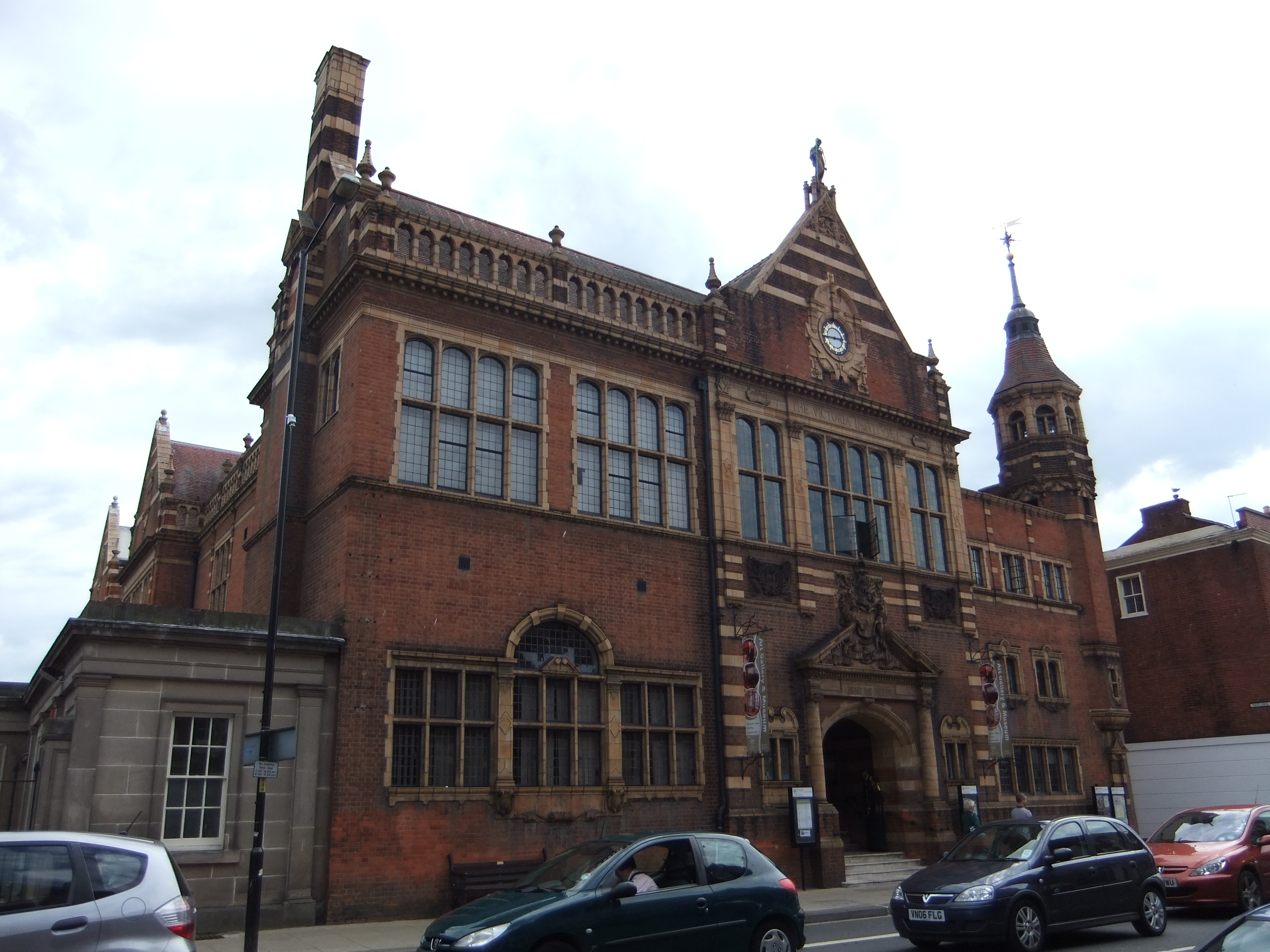
- Worcester City Art Gallery & Museum

- Shown in Worcestershire
- Established: 1833
- Location: Worcester
- Coordinates: 52.1963°N 2.2224°W
- Website: www.museumsworcestershire.org.uk/museums/worcester-city-art-gallery-museum/

The Worcester City Art Gallery & Museum is an art gallery and local museum in Worcester, the county town of Worcestershire, England.

== History ==
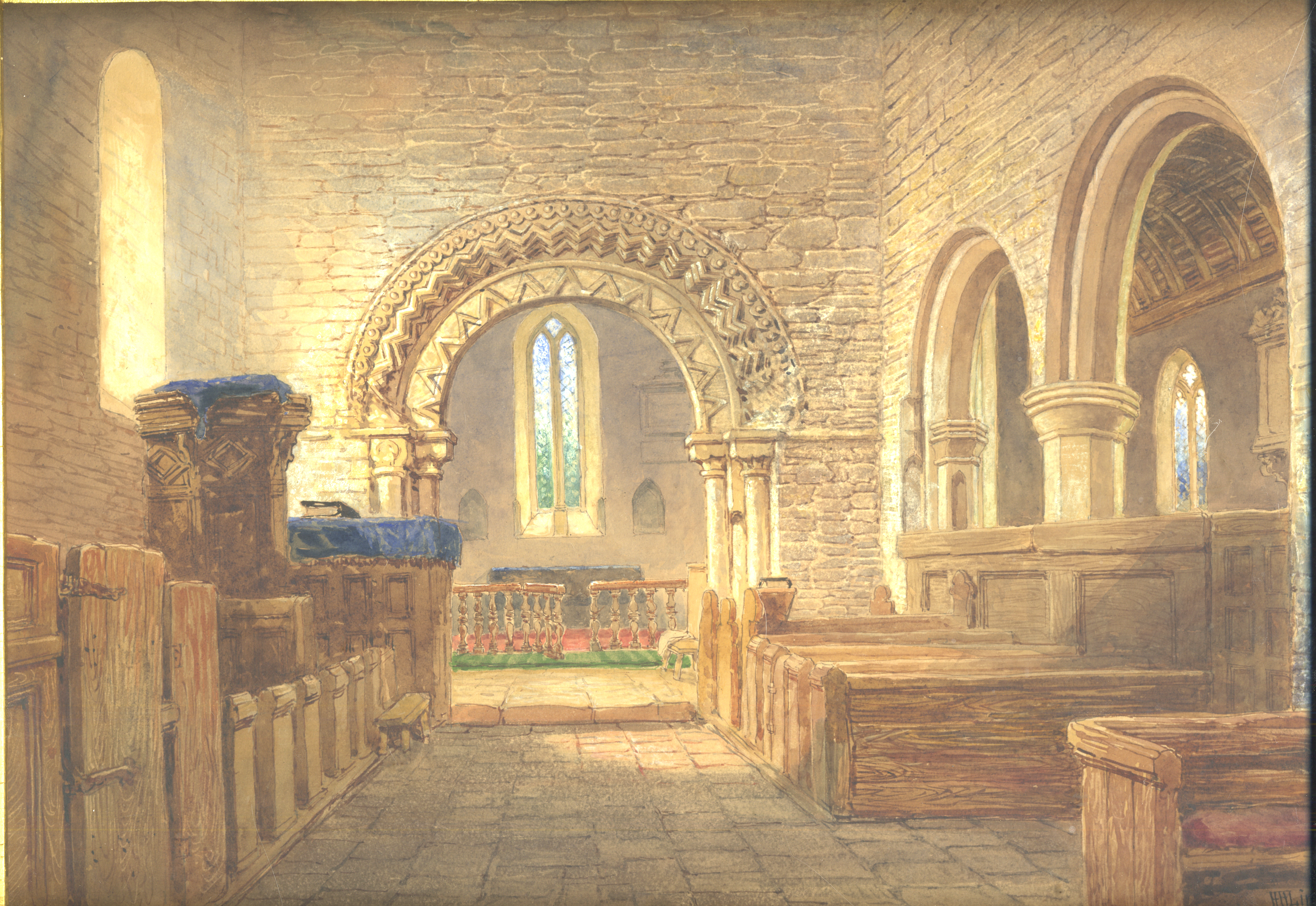
The gallery holds a number of works by Henry Harris Lines, including this one, Holt Church, as well as some of Lines' notebooks

The museum was founded in 1833 by members of the Worcestershire Natural History Society. It was originally located on Angel Street, but moved to larger premises on Foregate Street in 1836. Since 1896 it has been located in the Victoria Institute, which was established as a combined public library, museum, and School of Art and Science.

The Worcestershire Regiment Museum collection moved from Norton Barracks to the Worcester City Art Gallery & Museum in 1970.

In 2021 the Art Gallery & Museum received a donation of £300,000 from an unnamed donor.

== Collections ==
The gallery has a programme of contemporary art and craft exhibitions. Displays include the industrial history of Worcester, local geology, natural history, together with 19th- and 20th-century paintings, prints, and photographs. The Worcester Soldier galleries display the collections of the Worcestershire Regiment and the Queen's Own Worcestershire Hussars.

== See also ==
- List of museums in Worcestershire
