= Blakedown =

Village in Worcestershire, England

Coordinates: 52.403571°N 2.178555°W

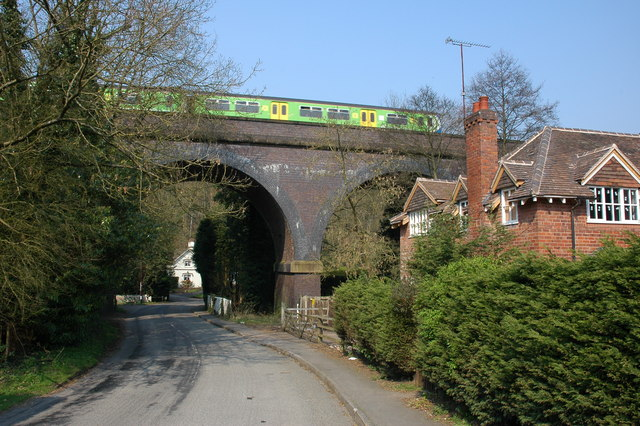
- Blakedown viaduct where it crosses Churchill Lane by Forge Cottage

- Location within Worcestershire
- Population: 1,447 (2021)
- OS grid reference: SO879784
  - London: 108 miles (174 km)
- Civil parish: Churchill and Blakedown
- District: Wyre Forest
- Shire county: Worcestershire
- Region: West Midlands
- Country: England
- Sovereign state: United Kingdom
- Post town: KIDDERMINSTER
- Postcode district: DY10
- Dialling code: 01562
- Police: West Mercia
- Fire: Hereford and Worcester
- Ambulance: West Midlands

Blakedown is a village in the Wyre Forest District lying along the A456 in the north of the county of Worcestershire, England. Its built-up area population was 1,447 in 2021.

Following enclosures and the arrival of the railway, it developed both agriculturally and industrially during the 19th century. Due to its transport links, it now serves mainly as a dormitory for the neighbouring town of Kidderminster and for the cities of Birmingham and Worcester.

== History ==
From the time of the Domesday Book, the Blakedown (earlier Bleak Down) area formed part of Hagley Parish; originally it belonged to Clent Hundred and later to the lower division of Halfshire. In 1888 the growing village was separated administratively from Hagley to merge with the small adjacent parish of Churchill; there is now a combined Parish Council for both villages.

Much of Blakedown was originally an area of common land, only enclosed in 1832. With the coming of the railway line in 1852, and the consequent agricultural and industrial development, Blakedown eventually became larger than its companion, Churchill. The stream running to the south of it as an affluent to Churchill's Wannerton Brook had been dammed to make a roadside pool as early as 1367. Formerly known as Blakedown Pool, it was later named Swan Pool. More dams were built higher up to form Springbrook Pool (now Ladies Pool), and Wheatmill Pool, eventually called Forge Pool when the agricultural mill there was redeveloped for industrial use. Even after the mills and forges were demolished, workers came from Lancashire and Cumberland for two months each year to cut the willows surrounding them for withies and clogs until the 1930s.

There are still two public houses serving the road through Blakedown: the Swan Inn, dating from 1760, and the Old House at Home. The latter started as a cottage taproom in the 1830s, eventually growing to absorb two neighbouring cottages. The confluence of streams at the foot of the village provided power for ironworks. These included Samuel Bradley's Spring Brook Forge, which in its heyday had a workforce of 150. The forge began as a glassworks, before diversifying to the manufacture of axles, and was demolished in 1917. The other establishment was the Blakedown Foundry, on the site of which Mill Cottage was built after 1920. Further along was a smaller foundry which later became a saw mill.

Many of the village shops that used to serve this clientele have now closed, although a post office and general store remain, along with some other small businesses. One business that disappeared in 2000 was the formerly renowned Blakedown Nursery, where the new Gladstone apple variety was identified in 1868. The recent building development on the nursery site was named Gladstone Place in its honour. However, the greater part of the modern village was built on the other side of the railway line in the years following World War 2.

There are horse-riding stables along the Belbroughton Road and the village also has some excellent sports facilities. These include a golf club which was originally a 9-hole course, now extended to 18 holes; a tennis club; and football and cricket pitches. The snooker club that was established in 1904 has former World Billiard Champion and local resident Rex Williams as Honorary President. The 1920s Parish Hall with its modest Art Deco frontage houses an indoor performance space known as Theatre 282. Outside is a new bowling green completed in 2016 and below it a recreation area.

=== Road and rail ===
In ancient times the Roman road between Droitwich and Greensforge ran just east of Blakedown and later developed into a saltway supplying the West Midlands. Another road linking Kidderminster to Birmingham was made a turnpike in 1753, and a toll house was built above Blakedown Pool at the junction with the Belbroughton Road. A milestone from this era with an 1807 metal plate still exists in the dip of the road. The toll house income dwindled with the coming of the railway and the building was eventually replaced with a shop. One source of financial loss was Samuel Bradley, the owner of Spring Brook Forge, who made a short cut from Forge Lane to the station in order to avoid paying dues on his goods. Planted with trees, it is still known as The Avenue.

The Oxford, Worcester and Wolverhampton Railway opened a station at the edge of the village in 1853 on land made available by the Squire of Harborough Hall. Originally it was named Churchill, then Churchill and Blakedown following the amalgamation of the two parishes. Now it is known simply as Blakedown railway station. In the station yard there still remain the single storey cottages built at the time for railway workers. The original viaduct over the wide valley of Wannerton Brook was built on wooden trestles. In 1885 what was by then the Great Western Railway replaced it with a parallel blue brick viaduct, although the red brick abutments of the old structure can still be seen on either side of the valley. The station was situated on Mill Lane, where level crossing gates were operated from a signal box. After that became redundant, it was acquired by the Churchill and Blakedown Historical Society for their headquarters and in 2016 was shifted across the road to a site adjoining the station.

=== Buildings ===
Settlement of the area along the Kidderminster road came slowly. The timber-framed Harborough Hall was built in 1635 for William and Anne Penn on land that had belonged to the family since the reign of Edward III. On William's death it was left to his two daughters, of whom the elder married Thomas Shenstone and was the mother of William Shenstone the poet. Damming produced a chain of pools below the house, curving round to Broome Mill, which was disused by the 1880s. Following shortly on the enclosure of Harborough Common in 1832, Harborough Farm was built on the other side of the main road, with two farm cottages further along the hillside.

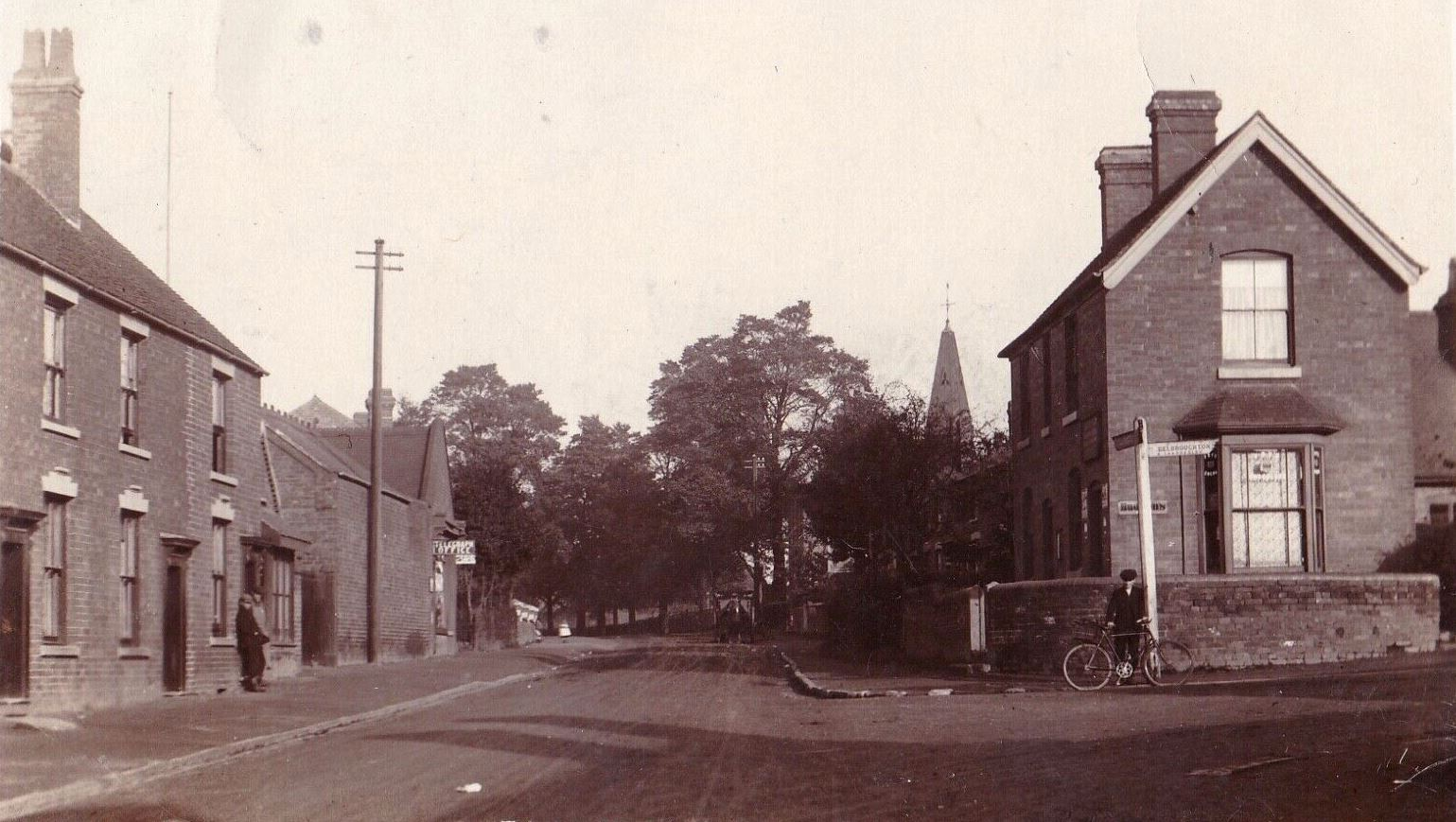
The main street in 1917 at the Belbroughton turn; the telegraph office on the left is now the post office

At the opposite end of the village, beyond the parish boundary, there was once a half-timbered cottage on the slope, with the village smithy on the other side of the main road, both of which were demolished in the early 20th century. Springbrook House, dating from the turn of the 18th century, still survives, as does the contemporary Churchill corn mill beside Wannerton Brook. Along the village street there are two survivals from the end of the 18th century, Castle Ash and Jack's Cottage (which now adjoins the Post Office). Rose Cottage, near the Belbroughton Road, dates from 1820 but has since been combined with the former blacksmith's round the corner. Beyond the blacksmith on Belbroughton Road (which continued to be called by its old name of The Common for decades) there were the narrow plots of Victorian cottage developments, each with their peaked porch. On the other side of the road were the cottages built for foundry workers in the 1830s at the top of Forge Lane.

By 1860 there were enough inhabitants in the village for the church of St James the Great to be built to a design by Gothic revivalist George Edmund Street. At first it consisted of a simple nave and chancel with an ornamental bell-turret at the gable end. The sandstone for the church was quarried from the grounds of Hagley Hall, the residence of the Lyttelton lords of the manor at the time. In 1865 two Sunday morning services were held to accommodate the growing population and in the following year a rooftop wooden bell-tower was added (later renewed in 1915 at the same time as a new aisle and vestry were built). A school associated with the church was first housed in a tin hut in the churchyard, replaced in 1885 with a brick building which now functions as a nursery school. The new primary school occupies modern buildings on a site adjacent to the churchyard.

Among the 20th century houses in the area, Knoll Hill along the Belbroughton road is notable for having been the former home of the show jumping champion Dawn Wofford. Above the Kidderminster Road, Harborough Hill House was built in 1925; the much larger and more secluded Wannerton House dates from 1924 and is accessed by a private drive leading off Churchill Lane. And along New Wood Lane is a newly restored Art Deco house, known as Blakedown Rough when it was first built in 1934.

== Gallery ==
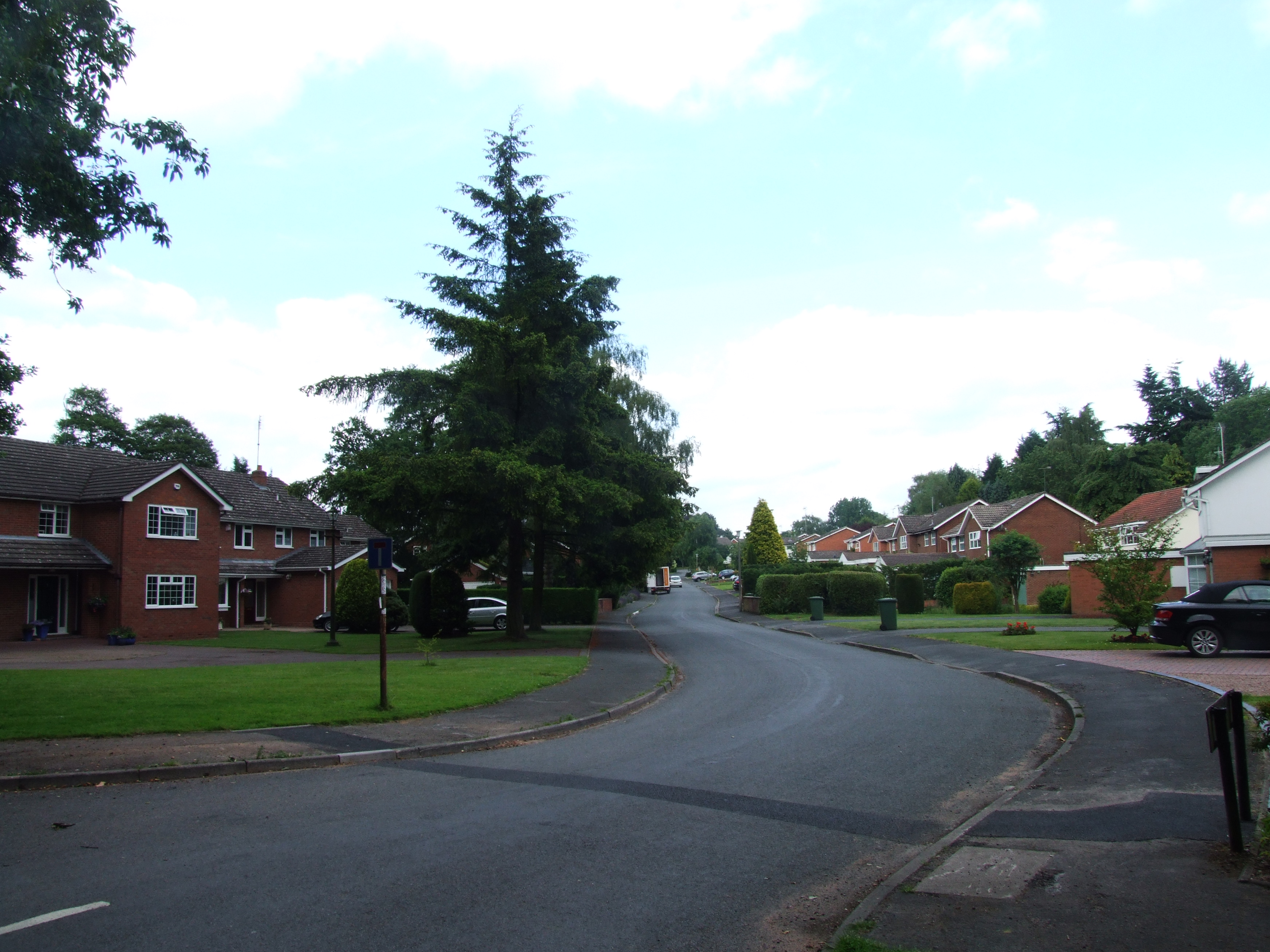
Wannerton Road

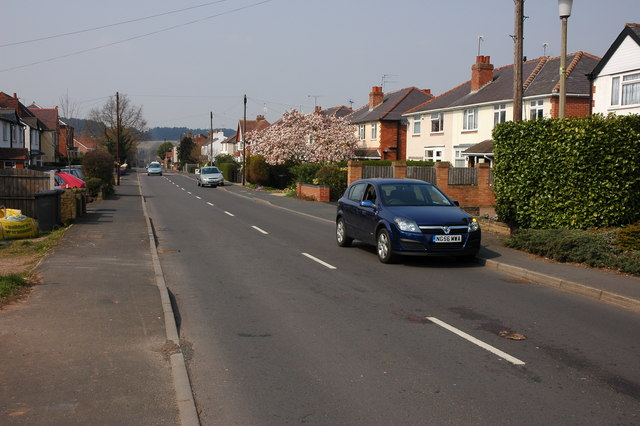
Belbroughton Road

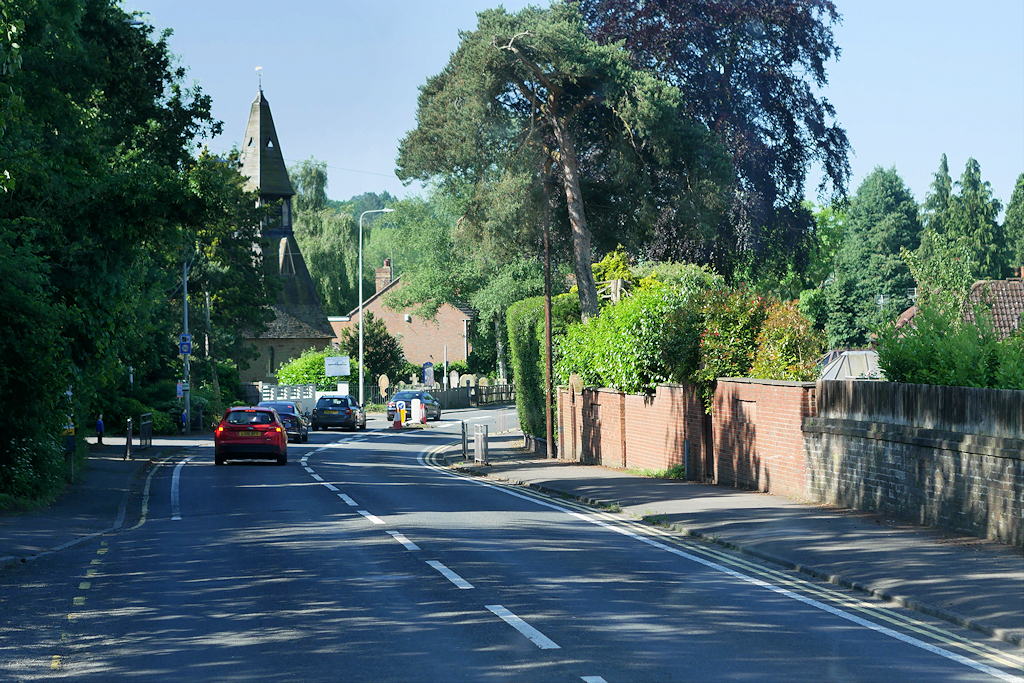
Birmingham Road

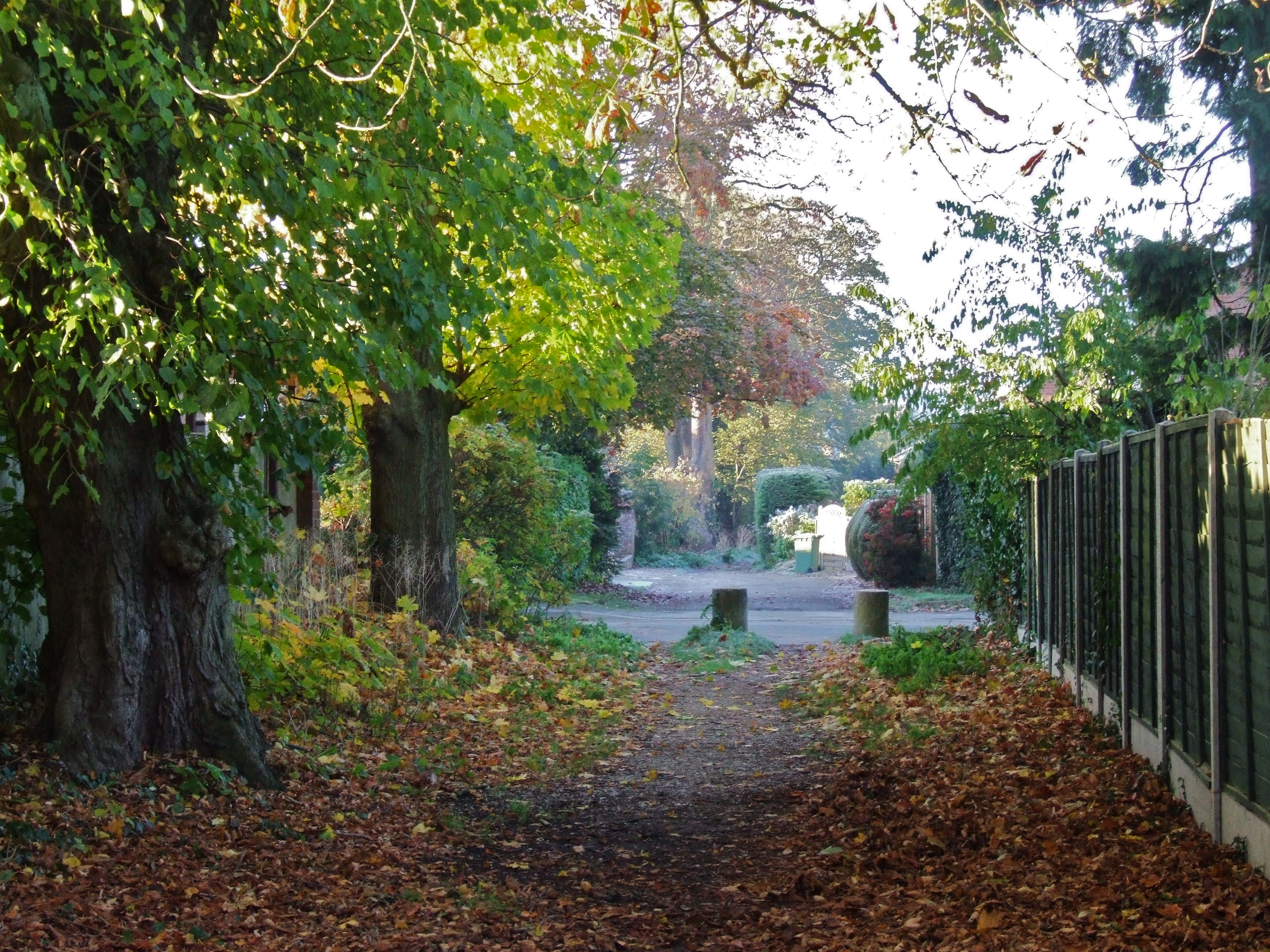
The Avenue

== Bibliography ==
- Adopted Local Heritage List, Parish of Churchill and Blakedown, Wyre Forest District Council 10 July 2012
- Blakedown Church History Book, compiled by Frederick William Young (1875-1966)
- Buildings of England series (Alan Brooks and Nicolaus Pevsner), Worcestershire, Yale University Press, 2007
- Churchill and Blakedown Neighbourhood Plan 2016-2026, Wyre Forest District Council
- A History of the County of Worcester: Volume 3 (London, 1913), pp. 130-136, Parishes: Hagley, British History Online
- Walk Around Blakedown, Hagley Historical and Field Society, 2003
