= Sedoanalgesia =

Medical practice combining sedation and anesthesia

Sedoanalgesia is the practice of combining sedation with local anesthesia, usually in the case of surgery. In medical studies, administering sedoanalgesia has been shown to be cost- and time-effective when compared to general or regional anesthesia, and it can reduce the amount of nursing staff, anesthetists, and equipment required for a given procedure. Frequently used in patients who present with considerable risk from conventional anesthesia and with elderly patients with co-morbid medical conditions.

== Medical Uses ==
Used in endoscopic gastrointestinal procedures, dental procedures, and minimally invasive surgeries.
