= Blakedown railway station =

Railway station in Worcestershire, England

Coordinates: 52.406°N 2.176°W

Blakedown
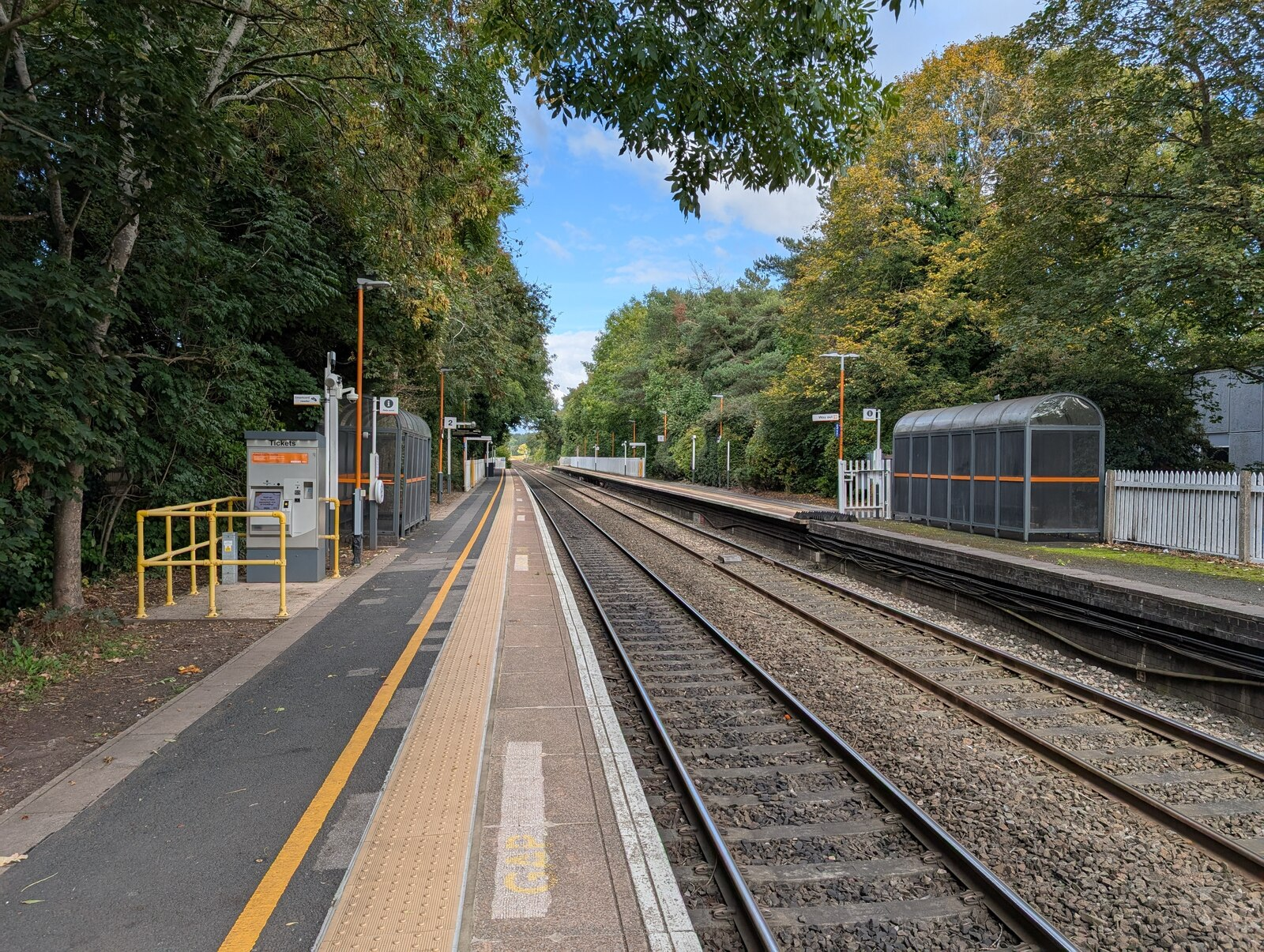

General information
- Location: Blakedown, Wyre Forest; England
- Grid reference: SO880787
- Owner: Network Rail
- Manager: West Midlands Trains
- Platforms: 2

Other information
- Station code: BKD
- Classification: DfT category F1

Key dates
- 1852 ? ?: Opened as Churchill; Renamed Churchill & Blakedown; Renamed Blakedown

Passengers
- 2021/22: ▲60,810
- 2022/23: ▲72,972
- 2023/24: ▲88,008
- 2024/25: ▲96,472
- 2025/26: ▲128,970
Location
Notes
- Passenger statistics from the Office of Rail and Road

Blakedown railway station serves the English village of Blakedown, Worcestershire. It was opened as Churchill in 1852, later becoming known for a time as Churchill & Blakedown after the two villages became a single parish.

== History ==
The platforms were lengthened in the 1990s to allow longer trains to call. This is because Blakedown is within the Birmingham commuter band and over the twenty years between 1998 - 2018 usage of the station has increased by 147%. Currently there is a proposal to develop a car park on an adjacent field site to cater for further anticipated growth.

Since August 2012 the signalling system has been altered, with the former signal box having been closed and control of the nearby crossing and signals transferred to the Saltley Rail Operating Centre. The old signal box was then acquired by the Churchill and Blakedown Historical Society for its headquarters and was shifted across the road to a site adjoining the station in 2016.

The line through the station was closed for nine days in 2026 due to a wildfire next to the track. Services from Birmingham Snow Hill terminated at Stourbridge Junction, and trains from Worcester Shrub Hill terminated at Kidderminster.

== Facilities ==
The station is unstaffed, with only a basic shelter on each platform. There is a level crossing immediately to the west of the platforms, and in the absence of a footbridge or subway this is also the only method for passengers to cross the tracks.

== Services ==
Since 2017, West Midlands Railway has run an off-peak service every 30 minutes each way, with off-peak trains terminating at Kidderminster westbound, and eastbound services running alternately to Stratford-upon-Avon and Whitlocks End. Through services are available to Worcester Foregate Street, Worcester Shrub Hill, and Dorridge at peak periods, with a nighttime service running to Leamington Spa Mondays to Saturdays. There is a two-hourly service from the station each way on Sundays, with through trains to and from Worcester.

From September 2002 until May 2023, Chiltern Railways peak-hour services from Kidderminster to London Marylebone called at Hagley. Therefore, Blakedown commuters could change there for a service to London.

Preceding station	National Rail	Following station
Hagley	West Midlands Railway; Stratford/Whitlocks End-Birmingham-Worcester via Kidderminster; Snow Hill Lines	Kidderminster
Hagley	West Midlands Railway; Leamington-Worcester	Kidderminster
