= Henry Hill Hickman =

British doctor

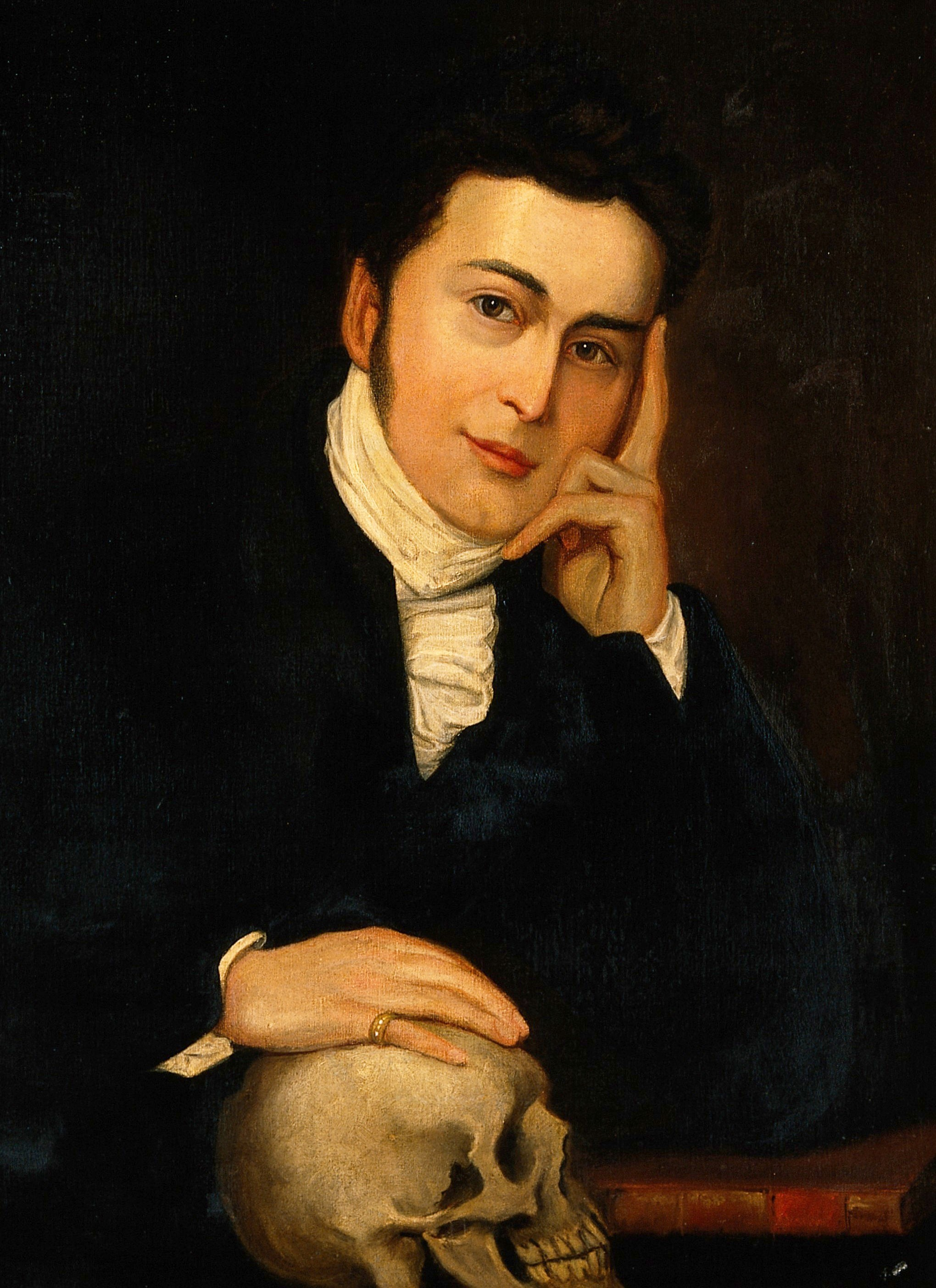
Henry Hill Hickman

Henry Hill Hickman (born Henry Hickman) (27 January 1800 – 2 April 1830) was an English physician and promoter of anaesthesia.

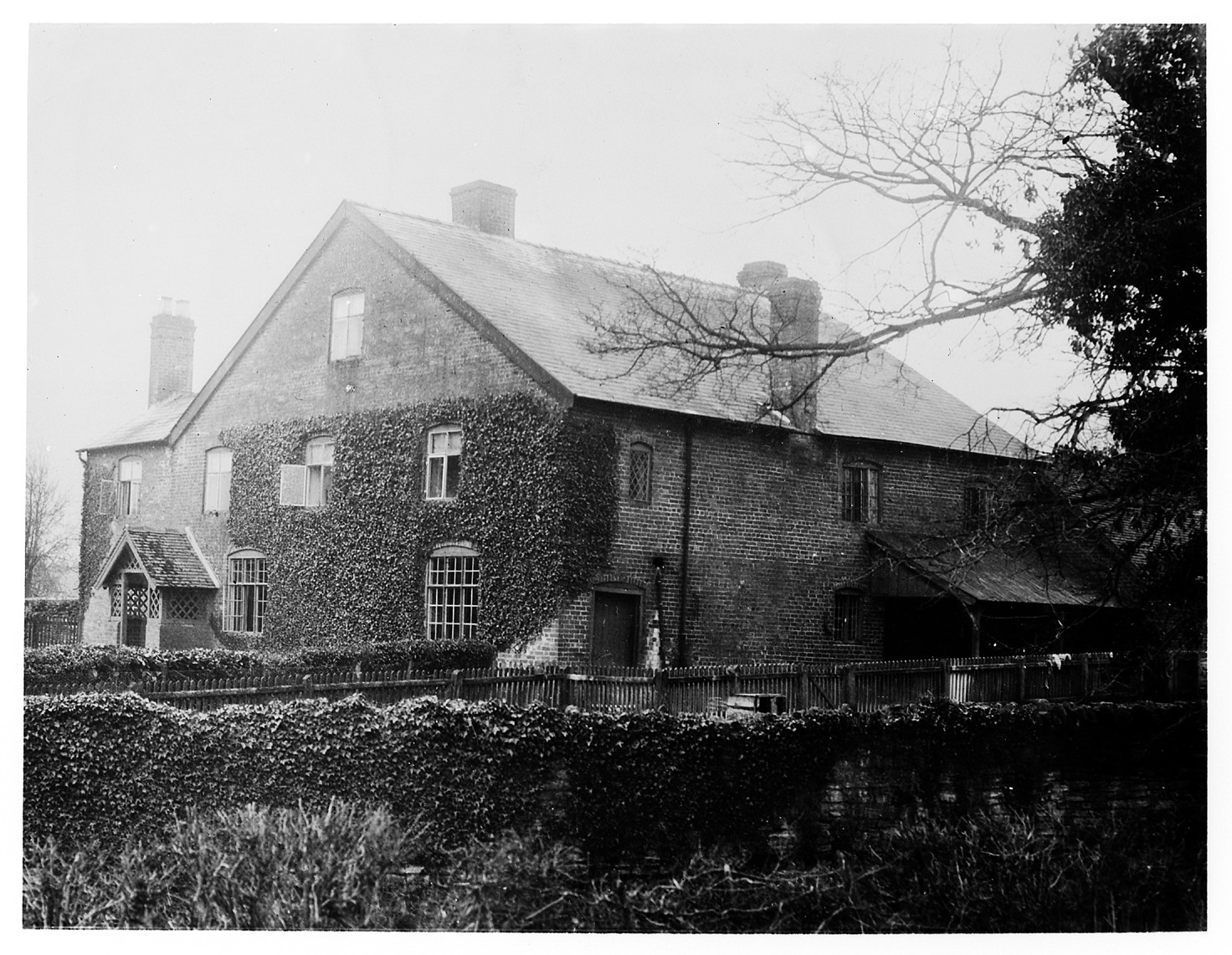
Birthplace of Henry Hill Hickman, the house at Lady Halton.

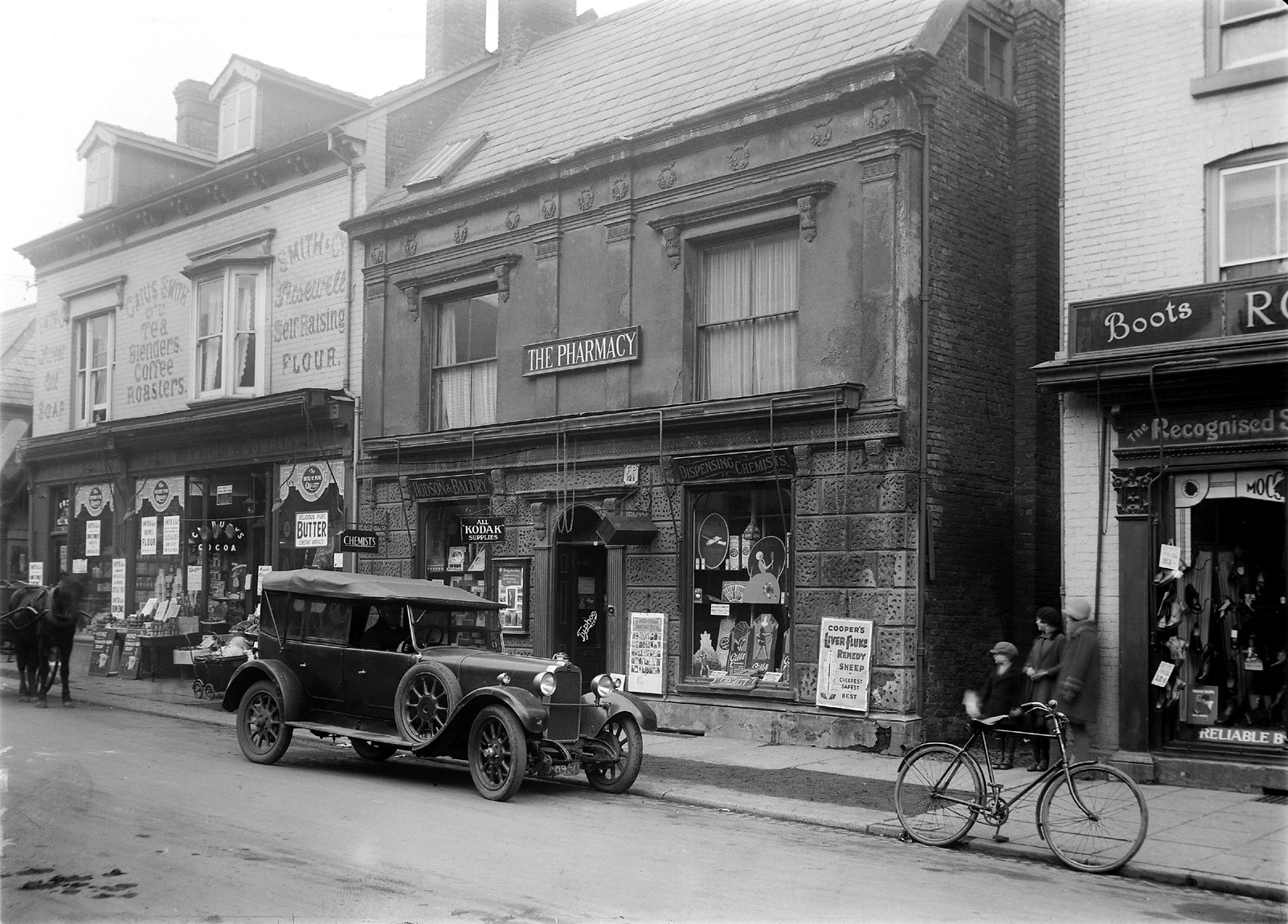
The pharmacy, Tenbury Wells, Hickman's surgery.

== Life ==
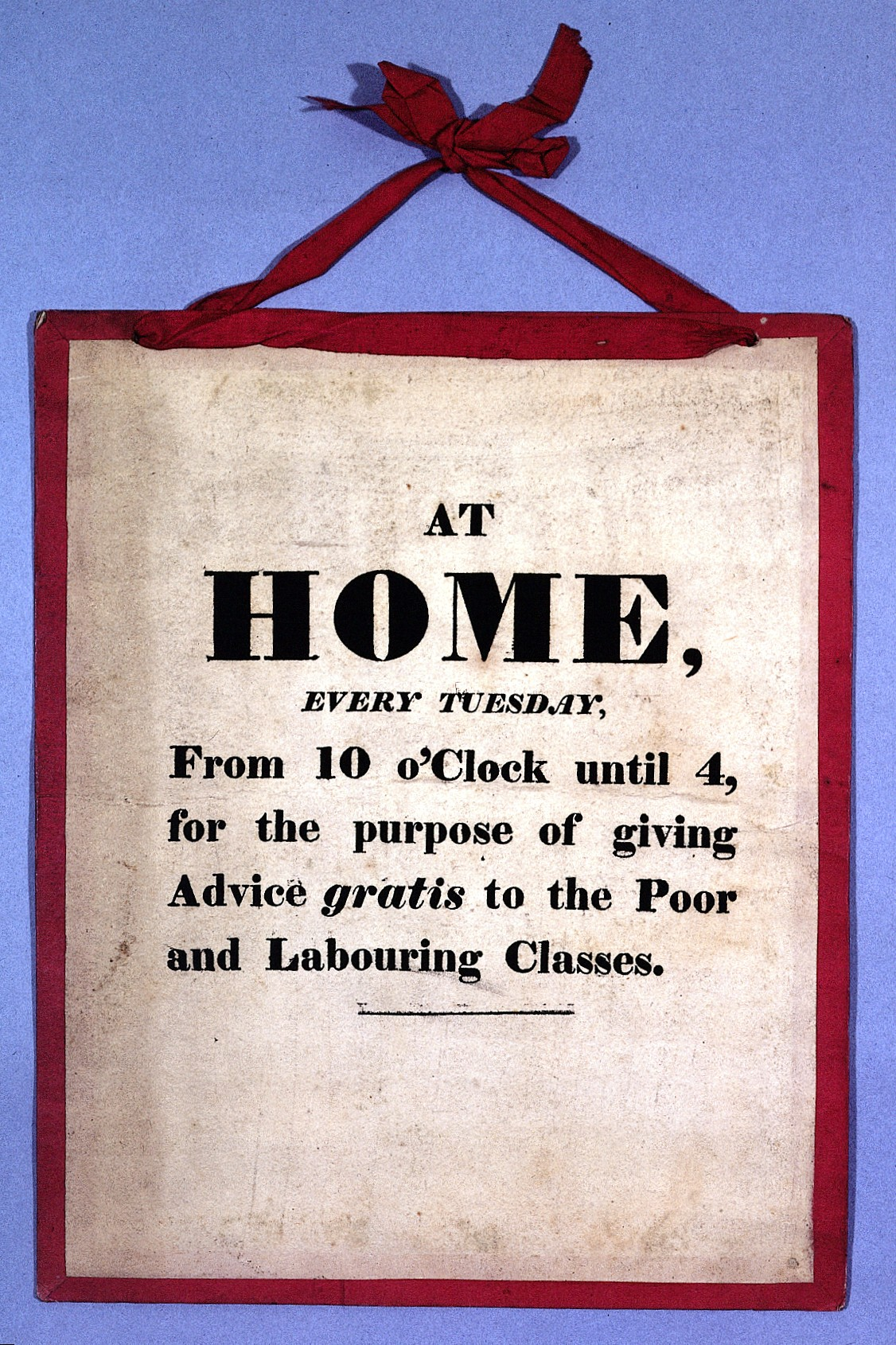
H.H. Hickman's reception card from his surgery.

He was born to tenant farmers at Lady Halton, (near Bromfield, just outside Ludlow, Shropshire). He was the third son and fifth child of thirteen children of John Hickman and his wife Sarah, daughter of Benjamin Hill of nearby Stanton Lacy. He was baptised on 30 January 1800 at Bromfield as plain Henry Hickman but began using Hill as his middle name in 1819.

After an apprenticeship to a surgeon known only through surviving notebooks, which included attendance at a private London anatomy school, he began his medical training at the Edinburgh Medical School, aged 19, in 1819 and left without a degree in 1820, which was normal at the time. He was admitted as a member of the Royal College of Surgeons in London in 1820.

After qualifying, he began his medical career in 1821, with his first practice in Ludlow and in early 1823 he began important animal experiments in anaesthesia. He would make the animal insensible, with carbon dioxide, known by the historical name carbonic acid gas at the time, then amputate a part of the animal to see whether the animal could feel pain under this 'anaesthesia'. Later scientists used nitrous oxide, ether, and chloroform to achieve similar effects.

While living and practising in Shifnal, on 21 February 1824, Hickman wrote up his work and sent it to Thomas Andrew Knight of Downton Castle, near Ludlow, one of the Presidents of the Royal Society, perhaps intending that the information would reach Sir Humphry Davy. It is not known if Davy ever saw the pamphlet, and a claim on a surviving pamphlet of his treatise that it had been read by Davy before Knight, is crossed out, indicating it had not been publicly read.

Hickman, disillusioned by the lack of response and wounded by an 1826 article in The Lancet titled 'Surgical Humbug' that ruthlessly criticized his work, went to Paris and submitted his writing to King Charles X of France in April 1828. This was forwarded to the Section of Medicine at the French Academy of Sciences, but despite the support of Napoleon's field surgeon, Baron Dominique-Jean Larrey, who spoke that he had noticed that wounded soldiers felt no pain when, numbed by cold, he performed amputations, Hickman met a similar response in France to that he had received in England.

With success eluding him, he returned to England and set up a new practice, in Teme Street, at number 18, in Tenbury Wells, Worcestershire. These premises are now occupied by an optician's practice. Hickman died aged 30 from syphilis, and was buried at Bromfield on 2 April 1830.

Hickman married in 1821 Eliza Hannah Gardner, daughter of a farmer of Leigh Court near Worcester, with whom he had one son and three daughters.

== Current views ==
Unappreciated at the time of his death, his work has since been positively reappraised and he is now recognised as one of the fathers of anaesthesia. In 1847, the Medical Times commented in an article on anaesthesia: "The principle was discovered by Mr Hickman and it is in the principle the invention resides." Henry Wellcome, who became interested in Hickman's story, formed a collection of Hickman memorabilia for his museum, whose anaesthetics section collected £256 to repair Hickman's gravestone. Tenbury Museum has an exhibition of items linked to Henry Hill Hickman.

In 1931, England's Royal Society of Medicine founded the Hickman Medal, which is awarded to individuals for original work of outstanding merit in anesthesia. The honor is given once every three years.
