= Churchill Forge Mill =

Water-powered forge mill in England

Coordinates: 52.414304°N 2.173389°W

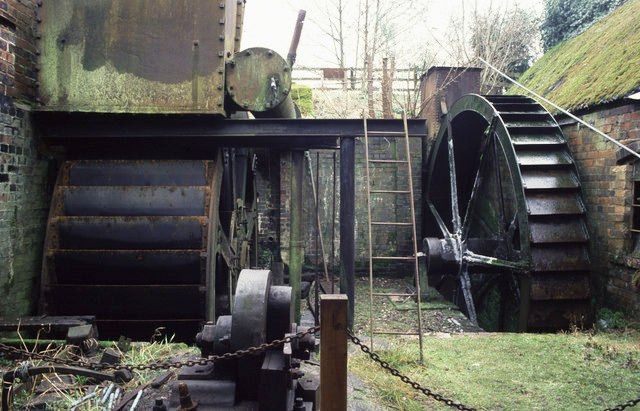
The water wheels at Churchill Forge Mill.

Churchill Forge Mill, situated in the Worcestershire village of Churchill, is one of the last water-powered forge mills remaining in an intact state in the UK and as such is an important example of the industrial heritage of the West Midlands. Part of the site has been restored to working condition and is now maintained and operated by the Churchill Forge Trust.

== History ==
Churchill Forge lies in the valley of the Ganlow Brook. In Mediaeval times it was dammed to provide a pond, from which a sluice led the water to turn the mill’s wheels. The earliest evidence of Churchill Forge is found in a charter dating from 1238 by which Robert de Hurcote granted Hugh Drugel "the whole land of Churchill, with the advowson of the church and the mill" on Hugh’s marriage with his sister Margery. Robert had paid twenty shillings to the Lord of Hagley for the settlement and a yearly rent to the Prior of Dudley for the mill. It changed hands at various times thereafter, and a blade mill and pool are mentioned in another account toward the end of the sixteenth century.

The Bache family, who were responsible for developing the surviving brick mill during the nineteenth century, had long lived in the area and their descendants still own Churchill Forge. In the 18th century, William Bache (1743-1817) ran the nearby Stakenbridge Forge, just a few fields away, and his son William combined the businesses after marrying the daughter of the previous owner of Churchill Forge in 1796. Thereafter one or other of the family were in ownership, although some later entered the learned professions while keeping a share in the business.

After World War I, Benjamin Bache returned from working in a Stourbridge forge to re-open the one at Churchill after it had been closed due to shortage of manpower during the war. Together with his son Claude he commenced trading as "Benjamin Bache and Son, Spade, Blade, Shovel and Ladle Works". Claude Bache then carried on the business after his father’s death until he retired in 1969. At the head of the steps leading down to the mill, there is still an ornamental gate with the family name in plain block capitals running vertically down the centre.

== The working mill ==
The forge was used from 1700 onwards to produce edged agricultural tools such as spades, shovels, forks, rakes, hoes, and cultivator blades; it also catered to local industries with special shovels (known as skippets) for the nearby salt workings at Droitwich, and pouring ladles for the Stourbridge glass industry and the Black Country metal refineries.

The main wheel driving the forge machinery in the present building has a diameter of 17 feet and is 5 feet 3 inches wide. It is mounted on an 18 foot cast iron axle which carries two of the original flywheels that once operated trip hammers. There is now a spur wheel which meshes with a smaller one and in turn powers a flat belt that drives various hammers, presses and other machines. A crank on the axle also operates a crocodile shear capable of cutting mild steel. An older wheel dating from the 19th century is 17 feet in diameter, but only 2 feet 3 inches wide. This has an oaken axle and was formerly used to power the furnace blower for the forge and two wet grindstones.

In 1979 a small group, which included some of the Bache descendants, formed a preservation trust which became Churchill Forge Trust Limited in 1981. This has been responsible for keeping the building in repair and the machinery in working order. On various days the mill is open to visitors and can be seen in operation.
