= Sedation dentistry =

Drug-induced relaxation of dental patients

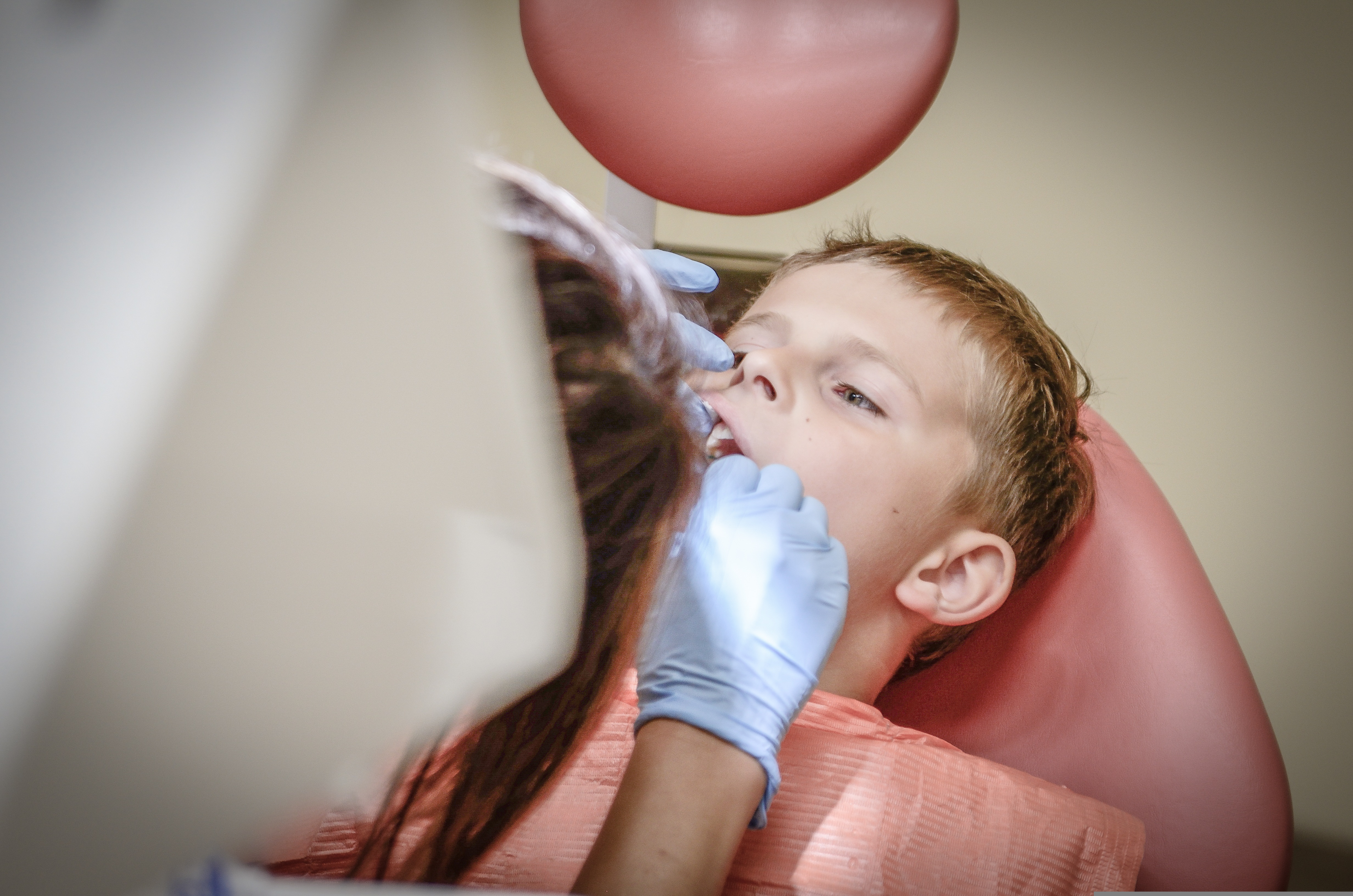
Sedation dentistry is important for treatment to be carried out in patients who are easily frightened during treatment, such as children.

Sedation dentistry refers to the use of pharmacological agents to induce relaxation and often sleep in a patient prior to and during a dental appointment. It is also known as conscious sedation, where it is defined as "a technique in which the use of a drug / drugs produces a state of depression of the central nervous system enabling treatment to be carried out, but during which verbal contact with the patient is maintained throughout the period of sedation". The pharmacological agents used differ depending on patient, level of sedation desired and medical professional administering the sedation medications. The medications can belong to a class of drugs called sedatives, which exert their action by depressing the central nervous system, specifically those areas concerned with conscious awareness. Medications used to obtain sedation often include a benzodiazepine (i.e. alprazolam, triazolam, diazepam), opioids (i.e. fentanyl), dissociative (i.e. ketamine) and anti-histamines (i.e. hydroxyzine, Benadryl).

Sedation dentistry is essential for children to be able to cope with traumatic procedures such as extraction, restorative procedures.

Every practitioner should be aware of the viable and appropriate sedative measures while incorporating anxiety-reducing procedures.

== Indication for Nitrous Oxide/Oxygen Inhalation Sedation ==
Primary Indication	Specific Indications	Rationale & Mechanisms
Psychological	Management of Fear & Anxiety; Procedures: For procedures generally considered non-threatening, which may be traumatic for some patients.	Considered the most nearly ideal sedation technique for anxiety.; Readily controllable, making it suitable for a wider range of procedures than typical moderate sedation.
Medical Compromise	Cardiovascular Disease: Angina Pectoris; Heart Failure; Severe Cardiac Dysrhythmias; Post-Myocardial Infarction; High Blood Pressure; Acute Myocardial Infarction (in emergency settings)	Reduces myocardial O₂ demand by decreasing anxiety and workload.; Increases O₂ delivery to the myocardium (30-70% O₂ vs. 20.9% in air).; Provides analgesia, reducing pain-induced stress.; Proven success in emergency medicine (e.g., Entonox, Dolonox).
	Respiratory Disease: Asthma; Note: Chronic Obstructive Pulmonary Disease (COPD) is a relative contraindication, but can be used with caution.	N₂O is a non-irritating vapor and does not precipitate bronchospasm.; Sedation reduces stress, a known trigger for asthmatic episodes.; Caution in COPD due to potential for apnea from elevated O₂, though this is rare.
	Cerebrovascular Disease: Post-Cerebrovascular Accident ("Stroke")	Elevated O₂ level minimizes risk of hypoxia-induced seizure activity or further neuronal damage.; Safer than deep sedation techniques where hypoxia is more likely.
	Hepatic Disease: Cirrhosis; Hepatitis	N₂O does not undergo biotransformation in the liver.; It can be used without the risk of prolonged effect or increased plasma levels seen with drugs metabolized by the liver.
	Neurological Disorders: Epilepsy and Seizure Disorders	N₂O is not epileptogenic(does not induce seizures).; Prevents stress-induced seizures.; Safe when hypoxia is prevented by the technique.
Pregnancy		Considered the recommended sedation technique during pregnancy when combined with adequate O₂ (>20%).; Medical consultation is suggested prior to use.
Physical Reflex Management	Gagging (Hypersensitive Gag Reflex): For impressions, radiographs, and procedures in the maxillary palatal and posterior mandibular lingual regions.	Highly effective in eliminating or minimizing severe gagging.; Practical for very short procedures where other sedation techniques (like IV) are less practical.; Patient position (upright) can be modified as needed for the procedure and safety.

== Applications of Nitrous Oxide Sedation in Dental Specialties ==
Dental Specialty	Specific Procedures & Clinical Scenarios	Benefits & Mechanisms of Nitrous Oxide
Restorative	Initial Examination of a patient in pain; Removal of Provisional Crowns/Bridges from vital teeth; Drying & Cleansing prepared vital teeth for cementation; Occlusal Adjustment of crowns, bridges, or natural teeth; Insertion of Matrix Bands or Wedges; Use of Ultrasonic Instruments	Elevates pain threshold, making sensitive procedures tolerable.; Provides soft tissue analgesia (esp. for matrix bands/wedges).; Reduces anxiety from drill noise/vibration (occlusal adjustment).; Eliminates discomfort from short procedures where local anesthesia is often omitted.
Periodontics	Periodontal Surgery(esp. for anxiety and lengthy procedures); Initial Periodontal Examination & Probing; Scaling, Curettage, and Root Planing; Management of Necrotizing Ulcerative Gingivitis (NUG); Use of Ultrasonic Instruments	Provides soft tissue analgesia, crucial for sensitive, inflamed tissues.; Makes debridement of NUG-affected tissues tolerable.; Relaxes the patient for lengthy procedures.; Offers a reversible alternative to local anesthesia for hygiene procedures.
Oral Maxillofacial Surgery	Lengthy Surgical Procedures; Incision & Drainage (I&D) of Abscesses; Management of Localized Osteitis (Dry Socket); Suture Removal(difficult cases or sensitive tissues)	Provides analgesia when local anesthesia is ineffective (e.g., due to tissue pH changes in abscesses).; Makes irrigation/packing of dry socket more comfortable.; Helps manage discomfort during difficult suture removal
Endodontics	Gaining Access to the Pulp Chamber in a "hot" tooth with inadequate anesthesia; Placement of Rubber Dam Clamps on gingival tissue; Instrumenting Root Canals; Filling of Root Canals	Raises pain reaction threshold, modifying the patient's perception of pain even if not eliminating it.; Aids in reaching the point where an intrapulpal injection can be given.; Provides comfort for procedures where local anesthesia is not typically used.
Fixed Prosthodontics	Impression Taking; Placement of Gingival Retraction Cord; Removal of Provisional Crowns/Bridges; Adjustment of Castings (try-in & occlusal adjustment)	Diminishes the gag reflex during impression taking.; Elevates pain threshold for cord placement and cement removal on vital teeth.; Reduces sensitivity to vibration/noise during occlusal adjustment of castings.
Removable Prosthodontics	Preparation of Abutment Teeth; Occlusal Adjustments; Impression Taking; Fitting of Immediate Dentures at subsequent visits	Manages tooth sensitivity and anxiety during tooth preparation.; Aids psychological relaxation, allowing for more accurate muscle positioning for centric relation.; Reduces discomfort from adjusting and fitting dentures on unhealed tissues.
Orthodontics	Impression Taking; Placement or Removal of Bands and Wires	Minimizes gagging during impressions.; Soft tissue analgesia reduces discomfort from band/wire placement.
Pediatric	Virtually Unlimited Range of procedures where cooperation is needed.; Same indications as for adults (anxiety, gagging, lengthy procedures).	Highly valuable for managing fear and anxiety in children.; Limitation: Requires the child's willingness to accept the nasal hood and breathe through the nose, which can be a challenge with uncooperative patients.
Oral Radiology	Placement of Intraoral Films; Patients with Limiting Anatomy (shallow palates, exostosis, trauma); Anxious or Medically Compromised patients	Highly effective at eliminating/minimizing the gag reflex.; Reduces discomfort in patients with sensitive or unusual anatomy.; Note: Care must be taken with tubing to prevent shadowing on radiographs.

== Pharmacology of Common Sedative Agents ==
	Description	MOA	Things for patient to take note / example
Oral sedation	Most commonly used drugs: Midazolam, temazepam; Concentration: Oral: 0.25 to 1.0 mg/kg to a maximum single dose of 20 mg. Supplied - oral tablets 0.3–0.6 mg/kg. Syrup - 2 mg/ml	Midazolam enhances the effect of GABA at GABA-a receptor, which increases the inhibitory neurotransmission in the central nervous system, causing analgesia	When given orally as a premixed syrup or after being diluted with a pleasant, pH-balanced drink (such as apple juice), midazolam is quickly absorbed.; The drug may start to take its effect within 15–20 min, lasting for around 30–45 min.; Inhalation sedation is preferred over oral sedation because inhalation sedation is titratable, in that the dose can be adjusted based on the condition of the patient from time-to-time, however, oral sedation is a fixed dose.
Inhalation sedation	Most commonly used drugs: Nitrous Oxide (NO) / Oxygen aka "laughing gas" (others: ketamine); Concentration: approximately 25 ppm (45 milligrams per cubic meter); 70% nitrous oxide, 30% oxygen in the gas delivery system	inhibits N-methyl-D-aspartate (NMDA) receptors (just like ketamine, as shown in the diagram); Reduces excitatory glutamate transmission; Causes central nervous system (CNS) depression and analgesia	You will be able to hear and respond to any requests or directions the dentist may have.; A mask would be fitted properly.; You will be told by the dentist to breathe slowly using your nose, and within a few minutes, you will start to feel the effects of NO gas, such as light-headed, tingling in the arms and legs.; Some may even describe their arms and legs feeling heavy.; Ultimately, you will feel calm and comfortable.; After the procedure, 100% oxygen will be delivered for 5 minutes before removing the mask to clear the NO gas from the body.
IV sedation	Most commonly used drugs: Midazolam	Midazolam enhances the effect of GABA at GABA-a receptor, which increases the inhibitory neurotransmission in the central nervous system, resulting in sedation, anxiolysis, and anterograde amnesia.	UK: Midazolam for dental field; USA: Midazolam in combination with fentanyl; Propofol; Japan: Midazolam; Propofol in hospital settings
Nasal sedation	Most commonly used drug: Midazolam	Midazolam enhances the effect of GABA at GABA-a receptor, which increases the inhibitory neurotransmission in the central nervous system, resulting in sedation, anxiolysis, and anterograde amnesia.	UK: Intranasal midazolam, especially for paediatric; USA: Midazolam, and dexmedetomidine with increased popularity; China: Midazolam and dexmedetomidine which commonly used in paediatrics

== Adverse effects of sedation dentistry ==
	Adverse effects	Details
Common	Drowsiness	Patients may feel prolonged drowsiness after sedation, in which they may find it difficult concentrating or sleepy
Common	Nausea, vomiting	Patients may feel nauseous or vomit after sedation
Common	Dry mouth	Patients may experience dryness in the mouth or thirst after sedation
Common	Headache	Patients may experience headache after sedation, often caused by the contractions of the muscles of facial and scalp area that happens due to sedation
Common	Dizziness	Patients may feel dizzy or lightheaded after sedation
Less common/rare	Temporary memory loss	Patients may experience temporary memory loss in which they do not remember or recall what happened during the procedure
Less common/rare	Allergic reactions	Patients may be allergic to certain sedative medication used, developing allergic reactions like rashes
Less common/rare	Bruising	There may be minor bruising or swelling of the skin at the area of intravenous injection site
Less common/rare	Respiratory issues	There may be changes in respiratory rate, increases the risk of respiratory depression (breathing becomes slower/shallower than normal)
Less common/rare	Cardiovascular issues	There may be changes in heart rate or blood pressure

== Safety protocols ==
- Adherence to safety protocols while performing sedative procedures in dentistry is crucial to ensure safe and effective sedation in dental care with minimal risks.

Safety protocols	Details
Patient evaluation	A thorough and comprehensive assessment regarding the patient's medical history, physical evaluation, and medication use should be carried out by the dentist before giving sedation, as it is vital to identify any potential risk factors and drug contraindications. Fasting guidelines: Depending on the level of sedation your dentist may be giving, you will be informed whether fasting may be needed, where generally 6 hours is needed after a light meal, and 8 hours needed after a fatty meal.
Informed consent	Patients should be informed and educated with detailed information about the procedure, and associated risks, with consent obtained before sedation. They should also receive and be informed on post-operative instructions.
Qualified personnel	Only dental professionals that are qualified and trained can administer sedation to patients because they will be experienced and capable of monitoring the patients during the entire procedure and will be able to respond effectively to any emergencies.
Monitoring (during sedation procedure and recovery)	Continuous monitoring of vital signs are crucial during sedation as well as during recovery, these include the patient's level of consciousness, oxygen saturation, ventilation, heart rate and blood pressure. In order to carry out continuous monitoring, dental facilities should be equipped with appropriate monitoring devices such as pulse oximeters, electrocardiogram and blood pressure monitors.
Emergency preparedness	Dental facilities should have immediate access to necessary emergency equipment and medications, with a clear emergency action plan as well as staff trained in Basic Life Support techniques.

== Regulatory standards ==
Regulatory standards in sedative dentistry are vital in ensuring patient safety and it may vary by location and country. It requires dental facilities to meet specific criteria regarding training (ex: Basic Life Support), equipment and the handling of sedation agents, based on guidelines from professional organizations (ex: American Dental Association, American Society of Anesthesiologists), in which dentists must obtain specific permits or certifications from their country or state dental board in order to be qualified to administer different levels of sedation.

== Sedation Dentistry in Special Populations & Clinical Scenarios ==
Patients with special needs are individuals who require additional support due to medical, physical, mental, or psychological impairments that severely hinder their ability to perform essential activities in the usual way. The common clinical challenges in special populations include poor cooperation and compliance, often resulting from intellectual or mental disabilities that limit understanding of dental procedures and heighten anxiety and fear, leading to increased refusal of conventional treatment approaches. Therefore, sedation dentistry is often required to reduce anxiety and facilitate smoother delivery of dental treatment.

Contraindication of sedation:

- Patients with potential upper airway obstruction (such as PSN with severe cerebral palsy)
- Patients with severe systemic illness that compromise their respiratory or cardiovascular function.
- Patients taking long-term antipsychotic or psychotropic medications (such as PSN with schizophrenia or bipolar disorder)
- Patients with muscular dystrophy
- Patients taking a contraindicated drug such as diazepam

Condition	Dental concerns	Sedative agents
Down syndrome	Craniofacial anomalies; Dental anomalies; Cardiovascular abnormalities; Tracheal abnormalities; Atlanto-axial instability; Periodontitis; Lack of cooperativity	Midazolam; Ketamine (use with caution); # Ketamine may cause side effects like elevated blood pressure and reduced breathing rate. When used inappropriately, it can lead to severe, life-threatening outcomes such as respiratory failure, cardiac complications, and seizures.
Autism spectrum disorder (ASD)	Poor oral hygiene; Inability to tolerate longer procedure; Sensory issues; Dental anxiety; Food selectivity	Midazolam; Propofol for deep sedation or general anaesthesia; # ASD patient who have vitamin B12 deficiency should not use N2O due to inhibition of methionine synthase.
Attention deficit hyperactivity disorder (ADHD)	Inability to tolerate lengthy procedures; Parfunctional habits	Nitrous oxide; Midazolam
Cerebral palsy (CP)	Incompetent lips; Malocclusions; Difficulty in maintaining oral hygiene; Involuntary movements	Midazolam; Nitrous oxide
Alzheimer's disease	Poor oral hygiene; High prevalence of periodontal diseases and caries; Polypharmacy	Nitrous oxide; # Contraindication: benzodiazepines due to high risk of drug interaction in patient with Alzheimer's disease.
Epilepsy	Anxiety-triggered seizures; Sudden movements risking safety; Increased caries and periodontal disease; Fractured teeth/restorations during seizures	Midazolam (anxiolytic and anticonvulsant)

=== Clinical scenario (Korea) ===
1. Trends in sedation and GA among special population
  - 2007–2019 = involving 116,623 special-needs patients
  - Sedation (SED): 136,018 cases performed on 69,265 patients.
  - General Anesthesia (GA): 56,308 cases performed on 47,257 patients.
  - 6-fold increase in sedation use from 2007 (~3,100 cases) to 2018 (~18,528 cases).
  - Shows growing dependence on both SED and GA in managing dental care for special populations.
2. Most common disability receiving sedation
  - Attention Deficit Hyperactivity Disorder (ADHD)
  - Indicates behavioural disorders are major drivers for choosing sedation
  - Gender distribution: 64.36% male, 35.64% female -> male-dominant
  - Includes a wide age range (children → adults)
  - Used for patients with:
    - Behavioral difficulties
    - Mild intellectual delay
    - Dental anxiety/phobia
3. Most common disabilities receiving GA
  - Most common indication: Phobia / severe dental anxiety among disabilitiy
  - Also includes patients with:
    - Severe intellectual disability
    - Uncontrolled movement disorders
    - Medical conditions requiring full airway control
  - Higher complexity cases typically referred to hospitals with GA facilities
  - Used when extensive treatment is required or patient cannot tolerate sedation
4. Implications for sedation in special population
  - ADHD dominance in sedation cases suggests the need for:
    - Behavioural management strategies
    - Tailored communication Caregiver involvement
  - Demand for proper sedation guidelines and workforce training emphasized by the authors.
  - Supports the idea that dental clinics must be prepared for an increase in special-needs patients requiring sedation
- References
