= Inhalation sedation =

Form of conscious sedation

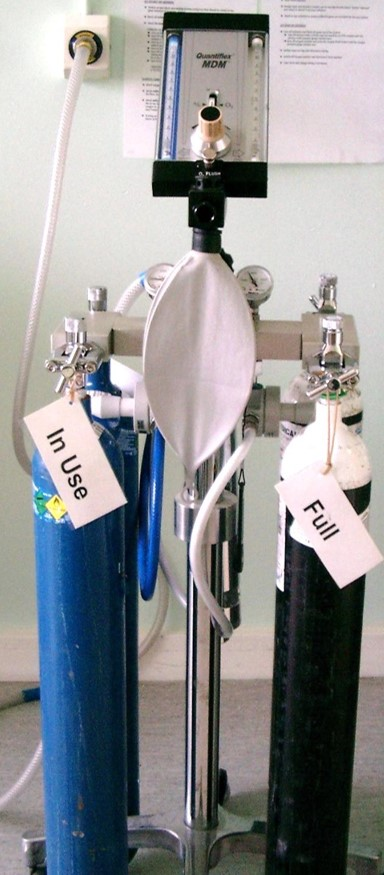
Quantiflex machine used to deliver oxygen and nitrous oxide gas for inhalation sedation.

Inhalation sedation is a form of conscious sedation where an inhaled drug should:

1. Depress the central nervous system (CNS) to an extent that surgeons can operate with minimal physiological and psychological stress to the patient
2. Modify the patient's state of mind such that communication is maintained and the patient can respond to verbal command
3. Carry a margin of safety wide enough to render the unintended loss of consciousness and loss of protective reflexes unlikely.

== Medical uses ==
The following are possible uses for conscious sedation "dental anxiety and phobia, a need for prolonged or traumatic dental procedures, medical conditions potentially aggravated by stress (such as ischaemic heart disease, hypertension, asthma and epilepsy), medical or behavioural conditions affecting a patient's ability to cooperate, special care requirements".

== Side effects ==
Complications from inhalation sedation are rare, and are those events that require intervention to correct adverse physiological responses. They include over-sedation, respiratory depression/apnoea, unconscious patient, airway obstruction, vomiting, idiosyncratic responses, delayed recovery, and failure of conscious sedation.

Few absolute contraindications exist, however, "relative contraindications are important and can only be considered following a full assessment." They include:

- Medical conditions that would compromise the inhalation of the sedation medication, such as the common cold, tonsillitis, severe COPD or nasal blockage
- Neuromuscular diseases affecting the respiratory system, such as multiple sclerosis and myasthenia gravis
- Women in the first trimester of pregnancy
- Medical or behavioural conditions that limit a patient's ability to understand the procedure
- Claustrophobia or "fear of the mask".

== Patient assessment and selection ==
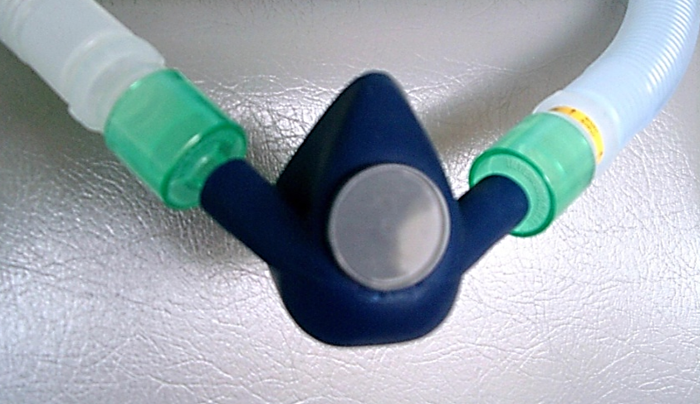
Nasal mask or hood

On a visit prior to the treatment session, the anesthesiologist makes a full assessment to determine the need for sedation and the technique most suited to the individual patient. This consists of a detailed record of the patient's history and a thorough examination. A medical, dental, and social history covers the patient's age, state of health, social circumstances, drug history, and any special needs. This helps determine the sedation technique most appropriate for a positive outcome for each individual. The examination takes into account the patient's general appearance, skin colour, pulse, blood pressure, and respiration rates. Only patients in ASA classes I and II are normally suitable for sedation in the primary care dental setting. Patients in ASA class III or IV should be referred to an appropriate secondary care (i.e., hospital) establishment with critical care facilities.

== Contraindications ==
Inhalation sedation using nitrous oxide has a long history of safe use in both medicine and dentistry. It can therefore be used safely in most patients in the dental setting. However, in some patients sedation with nitrous oxide would be unsuitable. Some examples are below.

- A patient who is unable to use a nasal mask. This is considered an absolute contraindication. Inability to use a mask can either be due to anatomic and/or disease-induced nasopharyngeal obstructions, or due to psychological and/or cognitive disturbances that lead to intolerance of mask placement. Examples of such patients include those with upper respiratory infections; severe sinusitis; and uncooperative paediatric patients or those with a fear of nasal masks.
- Patients who have recently undergone ear surgery. This is because any condition that compromises the patency of the eustachian tube increases the likelihood of pressure build up in the middle ear in the presence of nitrous oxide.
- Patients diagnosed with certain psychological disorders for example; schizophrenia or bipolar disorder. This is a relative contraindication because nitrous oxide sedation has been successfully used in patients with other personality and psychiatric disorders. The key concern with these patients is the use of nitrous oxide in addition to the many other psychotropic agents that they are already taking. This may further alter such patients’ disposition and lead to highly unpredictable results. Prior medical consultation is highly recommended for this group of patients.
- Pregnant patients. This is also a relative contraindication because retrospective studies have failed to identify any adverse outcomes for either the patient or the foetus. However, nitrous oxide sedation, like any other elective dental treatment, should be avoided during pregnancy. This is especially true in the early weeks of pregnancy to minimize the risk of possible toxicity to the developing embryo. Necessary/emergency dental care that requires the use of nitrous oxide to reduce stress should not be denied to a pregnant patient.
- Pre-cooperative patients. This is because the patient must understand they must minimize talking and mouth breathing to facilitate proper sedation.
- Patients with respiratory conditions such as COPD. These patients depend partly on a low blood oxygen to initiate a breathing stimulus, so inhalation sedation removes that hypoxic drive.

== Problems ==
Inhalation sedation with nitrous oxide/oxygen is a well recognised safe and effective technique. The desirable effect of the procedure is to relax the patient while maintaining verbal contact. Compared to other sedation agents, it causes minimal physiological stress to the patient and risk of loss of consciousness is less likely. However, problems can still arise. It is vital the dental staff are appropriately trained and qualified in dealing with complications and medical emergencies. Administering oxygen is of highest importance in an emergency situation. If patient is showing signs of oversedation, the concentration of nitrous oxide should be immediately reduced, and the oxygen concentration should be increased. All patients undergoing treatment under sedation should be continually assessed in the following:

- Respiratory rate
- Heart rate
- Oxygen saturation
- Colour of skin
- Level of consciousness

Any deviation from the normal values should prompt the dental clinician to lighten the sedation.The dental clinician can recognise and deal with the following sedation related complications:

- Vasovagal attack (faint). It is more common in severely anxious patients and can be indicated by nausea and vomiting, pallor and a rapid pulse. Management of this patient involves lying patient supine, maintaining the airway and administering oxygen through a face mask.
- Airway obstruction. Sedation can hinder the patient's gag reflex. Therefore, patients can find it difficult to remove a foreign body lost in the mouth during dental treatment. If this occurs, the patient should be encouraged to cough. In more serious cases of airway obstruction, up to 5 back blows and abdominal thrusts should be given while the patient is leaning forward.
- Severe hypotension. Nitrous oxide causes a decrease in blood pressure due to a reduction in sympathetic function. However, significant hypotension may occur, if a patient sits up too quickly from the supine position or becomes oversedated, which can be potentially dangerous. To manage this complication, the dental treatment should be stopped. The patient should be laid back and basic life support initiated. Oxygen should be administered and the concentration of nitrous oxide reduced.
- Nausea and vomiting. This is an undesirable effect of sedation, rather than a secondary complication. It indicates the level of sedation is too high and the concentration of nitrous oxide should be reduced.

There are some downsides relating to the use of nitrous oxide. It can present as a potential hazard to the operator in charge of administering the gas. It has been shown that continual exposure to nitrous oxide can result in illnesses, such as haematological disorders and reproductive problems. Thus, active or passive scavenging is essential to remove nitrous oxide from the environment. Another disadvantage can be the risk of mouth breathing. Inhalation sedation requires the patient to breathe through the nose, which can be especially difficult in very young children or patients with learning difficulties. Additionally, the drug cannot be used alone; it must be used alongside appropriate methods of behaviour management and local anaesthetic. Therefore, the degree of sedation can depend on the efficacy of behavioural techniques and psychological reassurance from the dentist.

== Equipment & safety features ==
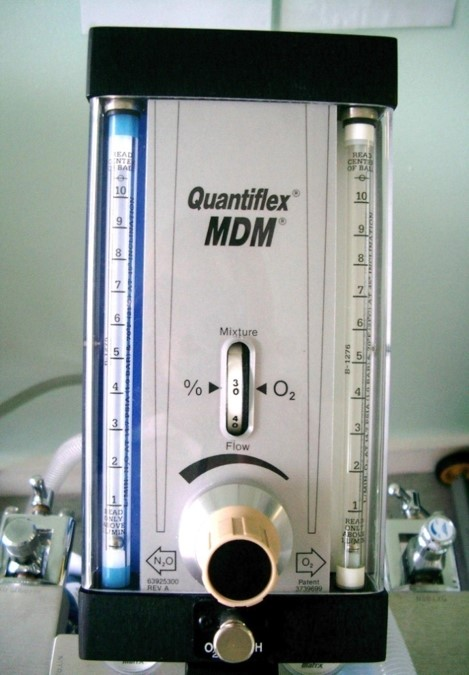
Quantiflex flowmeter

In the UK, machines used for the administration of inhalation sedation should follow the British Standards and be well-maintained according to the manufacturer's guidance.

=== Equipment ===
Equipment used for inhalation sedation for dentistry include:

1. Gas cylinders
2. Flowmeter
3. Reservoir bag
4. Conduction Tubing
5. Breathing apparatus (Nasal hood or face mask)

=== Safety features ===
Oxygen fail safe mechanism is the most important safety feature of the equipment used in inhalation sedation. Nitrous oxide flow is only allowed via an opened valve when there is flow of oxygen to the system. In any circumstances when oxygen flow is less than 30%, nitrous oxide stops flowing. This prevents the potential delivery of 100% nitrous oxide and it becomes a standard on every sedation unit made today.

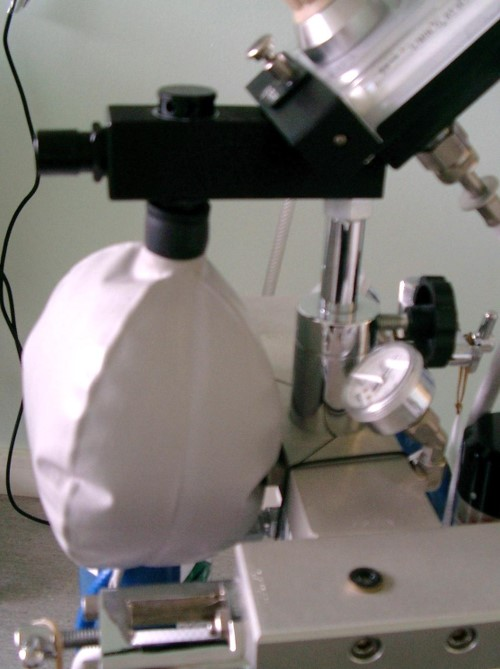
Reservoir bag

All nasal hoods should have scavenging ability— provide fresh gas to the patient through one or two hoses while the extra hoses eliminate exhaled gas by the patient via a vacuum system.

A pin index safety system prevents incorrectly fitting the two cylinders. In addition, the cylinders are colour coded, which further reduces the risk of incorrect cylinder placement.

A diameter index system is also in place to prevent incorrect linking of hoses and stems—the attachment couplings, hoses, and stems are different diameters.

Pressure relief devices that dissipate contents of the cylinder to the atmosphere prevent explosion of cylinder due to over-filling. In an emergency, an oxygen flush or emergency oxygen system passes a high flow of high pressure oxygen direct from the source bypassing intermediate meters.

Several alarm systems are used to indicate a depleting oxygen supply. Audible alarms are required in Europe and are recommended in the United States.

== History ==
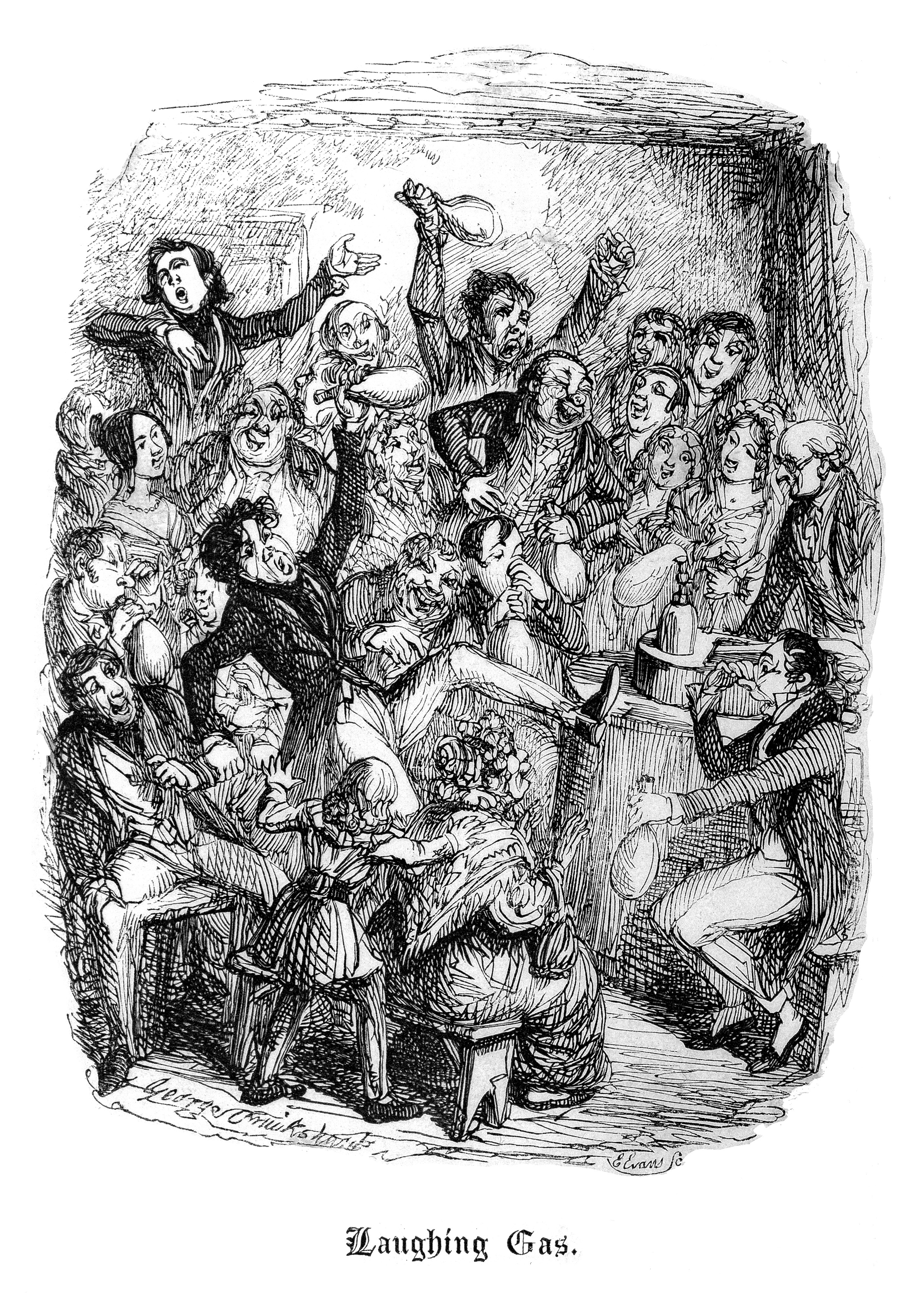
"Laughing gas" was often used as entertainment in the early 1800s.

Nitrous oxide was first discovered by Joseph Priestley in 1772. In 1795, Humphry Davy and surgeon J. B. Borlase experimented with nitrous oxide and the effects of its inhalation. Davy then published a book in 1799 hinting the possible role of nitrous oxide in achieving mild anaesthesia during surgical procedures. In 1844, Dr. Horace Wells carried out an experiment on himself where he had Professor Gardner Quincy Colton administer nitrous oxide to himself prior to a wisdom tooth extraction by Dr. John Riggs. Wells discovered that he was unaware of the procedure and experienced absolutely no pain during the procedure.

In 1824, Henry Hill Hickman used carbon dioxide to achieve a state of "suspended animation" in animals; successfully diminishing pain during the surgical procedure.

In 1831, chloroform was discovered by Justus von Liebig in Germany, Samuel Guthrie in New York and Eugène Soubeiran in France, all of whom worked independently.

In 1842, a chemist in Rochester, William Edward Clarke provided Dr. Elijah Pope with ether prior to a tooth extraction of his patient. In the same year, a doctor in Georgia, Dr. Crawford W. Long administered ether to John Venable for the removal of a neck tumour.
