= Churchill, Wyre Forest =

Village in Worcestershire, England

Coordinates: 52.415299°N 2.173147°W

Churchill
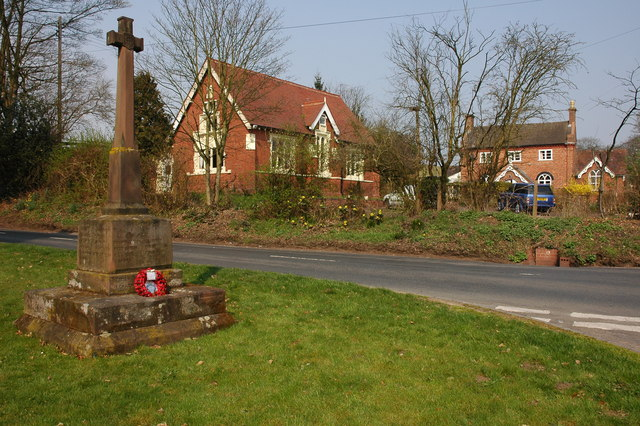

- Location within Worcestershire
- Civil parish: Churchill and Blakedown
- District: Wyre Forest
- Shire county: Worcestershire
- Region: West Midlands
- Country: England
- Sovereign state: United Kingdom
- Police: West Mercia
- Fire: Hereford and Worcester
- Ambulance: West Midlands
- UK Parliament: Wyre Forest

Churchill is a village and former civil parish, now in the arish of Churchill and Blakedown, in the Wyre Forest district of Worcestershire, England. It is near to Kidderminster and is the location of one of the few surviving water-powered plating forges in the United Kingdom - Churchill Forge Mill. In 2021, the parish of Churchill and Blakedown had a population of 1,838.

In 1931 the parish had a population of 201. On 1 April 1933 the parish was abolished to form Churchill and Blakedown, with its neighbouring village, Blakedown. The name Churchill derives from the Primitive Welsh crūg meaning 'hill/tumulus', and the Old English hyll, also meaning 'hill'. The first element was confused with the Old English cirice meaning 'church'.

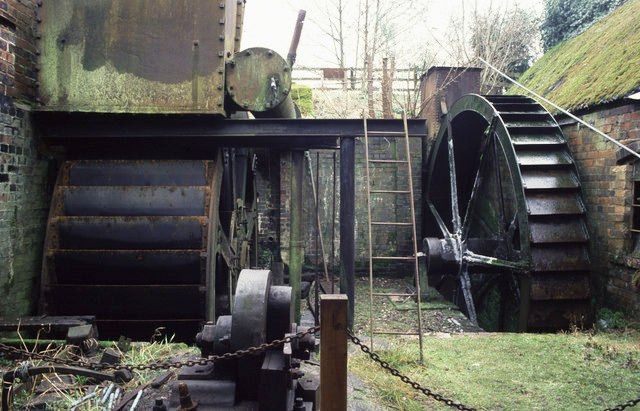
Churchill Forge

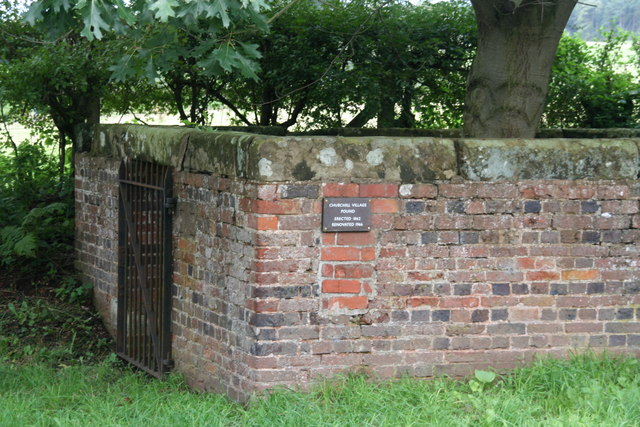
Churchill Village Pound
