= Tenbury Museum =

Museum in Worcestershire, England

Coordinates: 52.309426°N 2.595769°W

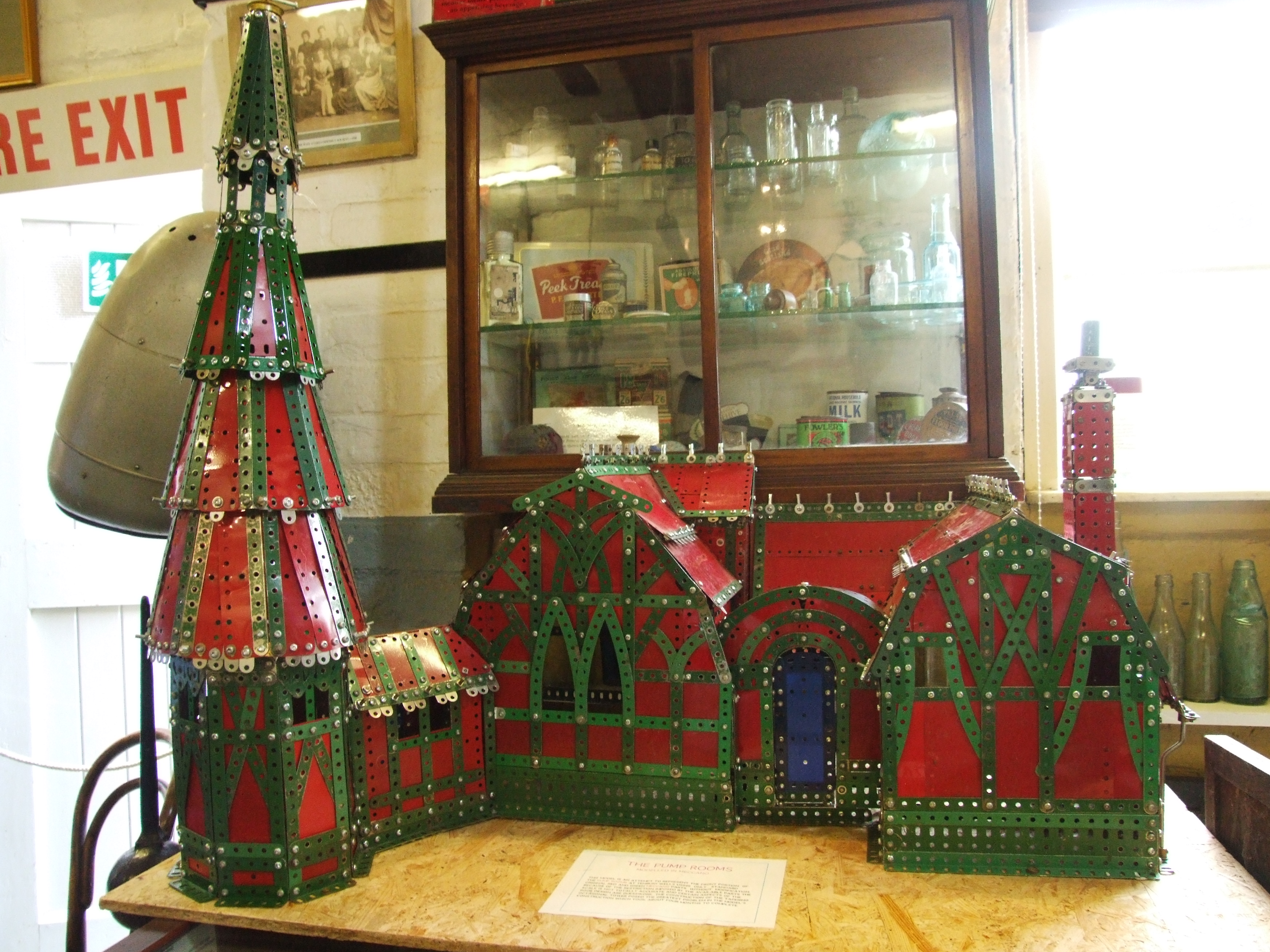
Model of the Pump Rooms, Tenbury Wells Museum

Tenbury Museum is a museum in the market town of Tenbury Wells, Worcestershire, England. It holds a collection of local and social history objects, plus copies of the Tenbury Advertiser newspaper dating back to 1871.

The building was originally Goff's Free School and continued in use as a school until 1914. In 1977 it was renovated for use as a museum.
