= Treasure Houses of Britain =

- Genre: Documentary
- Created by: Lady Victoria Leatham, John Bly
- Written by: J. H. Plumb, John Julius Norwich
- Directed by: Peter Newington
- Presented by: Throughout: John Julius Norwich; Program 1: Lady Victoria Leatham, Harold Geary, Harold Talbot (Burghley); Earl of Pembroke (Wilton); Duke and Duchess of Devonshire, J. Carter Brown (Chatsworth); Program 2: John Bly, Sybil, Marchioness of Cholmondeley, Marquess of Cholmondeley (Houghton Hall); Earl of Dalkeith, Duke of Buccleuch (Newark Castle, Bowhill, Drumlanrig Castle, Boughton); Sir Francis Dashwood (West Wycombe Park); Program 3: Marquess of Anglesey (Plas Newydd); Rosalie, Lady Mander, Simon Taylor (Wightwick Manor); Linda Lilburn, David M. Robinson, Susan Robinson (Lindisfarne Castle)
- Theme music composer: Antonio Vivaldi
- Opening theme: Concerto for Two Trumpets in C, RV 537
- Original language: English
- No. of episodes: 3

Production
- Producer: Michael Gill
- Production company: Malone Gill Productions

Original release
- Release: 16 December 1985

Treasure Houses of Britain is a 1985 documentary television series, narrated by John Julius Norwich and showcasing a number of country houses in Great Britain, produced for American television in concert with an art exhibition touring the United States at the same time.

The series was first shown in three parts on PBS in December 1985. The producer was Michael Gill, also known for Civilisation: A Personal View by Kenneth Clark and Alistair Cooke's America.

== Program 1 – "Building for Eternity" ==
=== Introduction ===
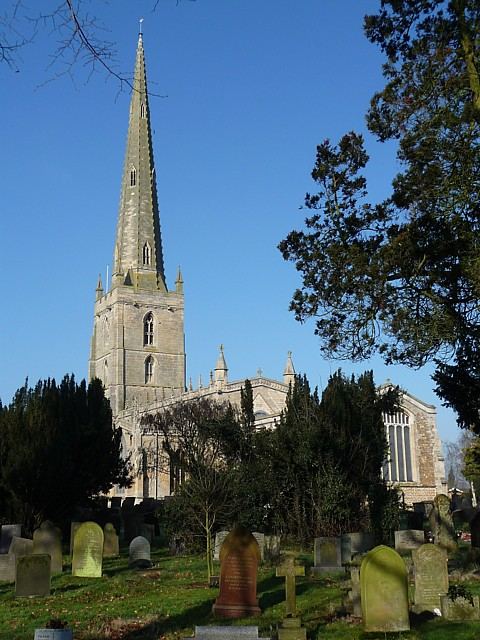
St Mary the Virgin's Church, Bottesford, 2010 view from the graveyard

The program opens with John Julius Norwich in St Mary the Virgin's Church, Bottesford. He points to the effigy of his "twenty-times great grandfather" Robert de Ros, who founded the church, as well as Belvoir Castle—which is briefly shown—and whose descendants, the Earls of Rutland—eight of whom lie entombed in the church—gained "fat rewards" by fighting for the king and by the disposition of monastic lands under Henry VIII.

[Norwich's ancestors] were people who believed profoundly in themselves and in God. They believed in the life eternal, and they built here for eternity."

As the exteriors of a ruined castle and some intact country houses are shown, Norwich tells of how a large number of British families have maintained their estates through the ages. In the Middle Ages, they maintained castles for defense; but as England became a safer place, they built manor houses, for comfort and as displays of authority and prestige.

=== Hardwick Hall ===
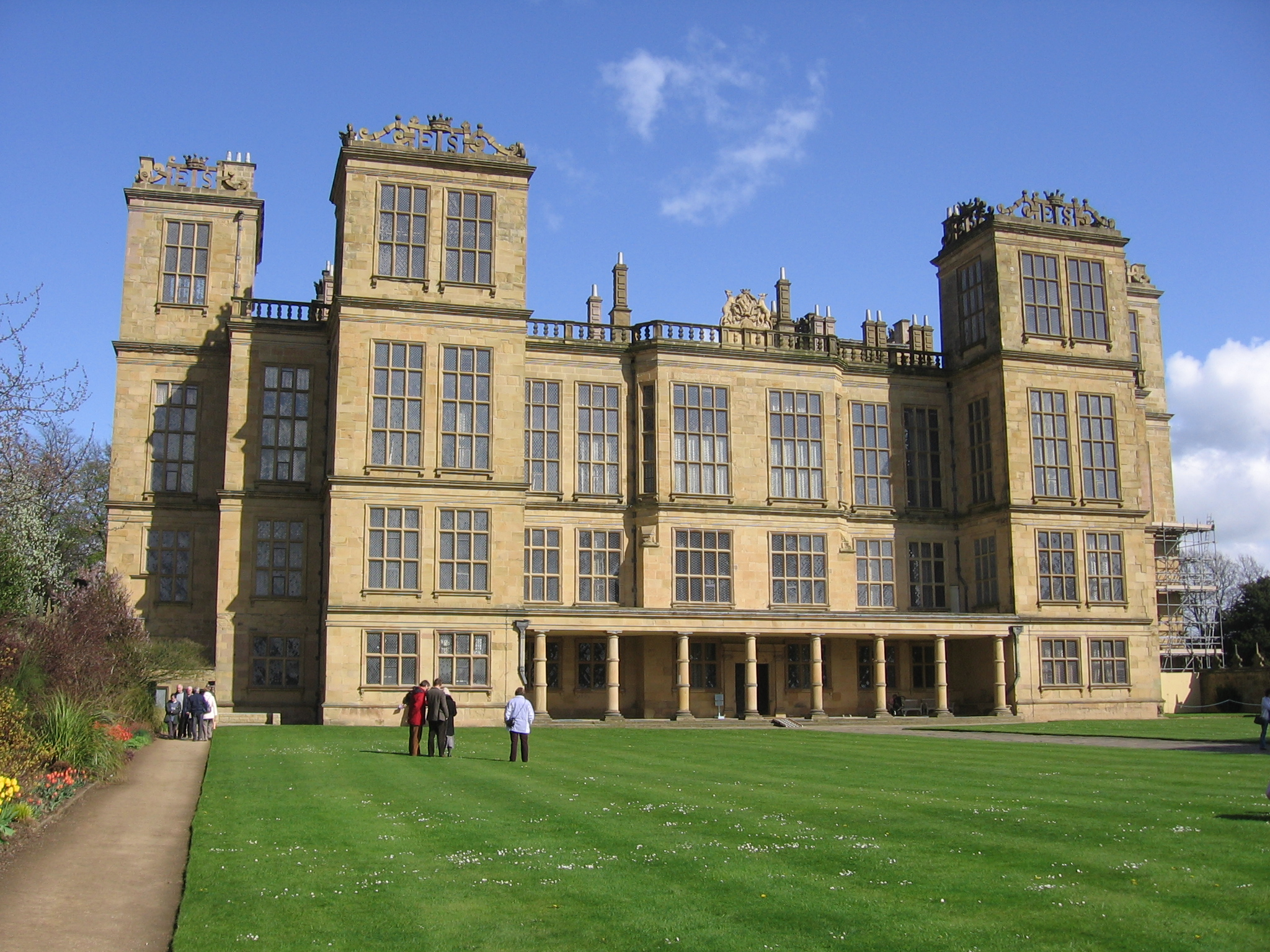
Hardwick Hall in 2006

"No one was more passionate about displays of status than Bess of Hardwick."

Hardwick Hall was erected by Bess, beginning in 1590—the year of her fourth, and last, husband's death—using stone quarried from Bess's estate, as well as glass made there ("Hardwick Hall, more glass than wall"). The house is the "most splendid and least altered of great Elizabethan houses".

The most important rooms are the high great chamber, with its plaster frieze and Brussels tapestries; and the long gallery, 166 feet in length, with many framed paintings—including one of Bess herself, by Rowland Lockey, and loaned for the exhibition—hung directly on its tapestries, as a form of display.

=== Burghley House ===
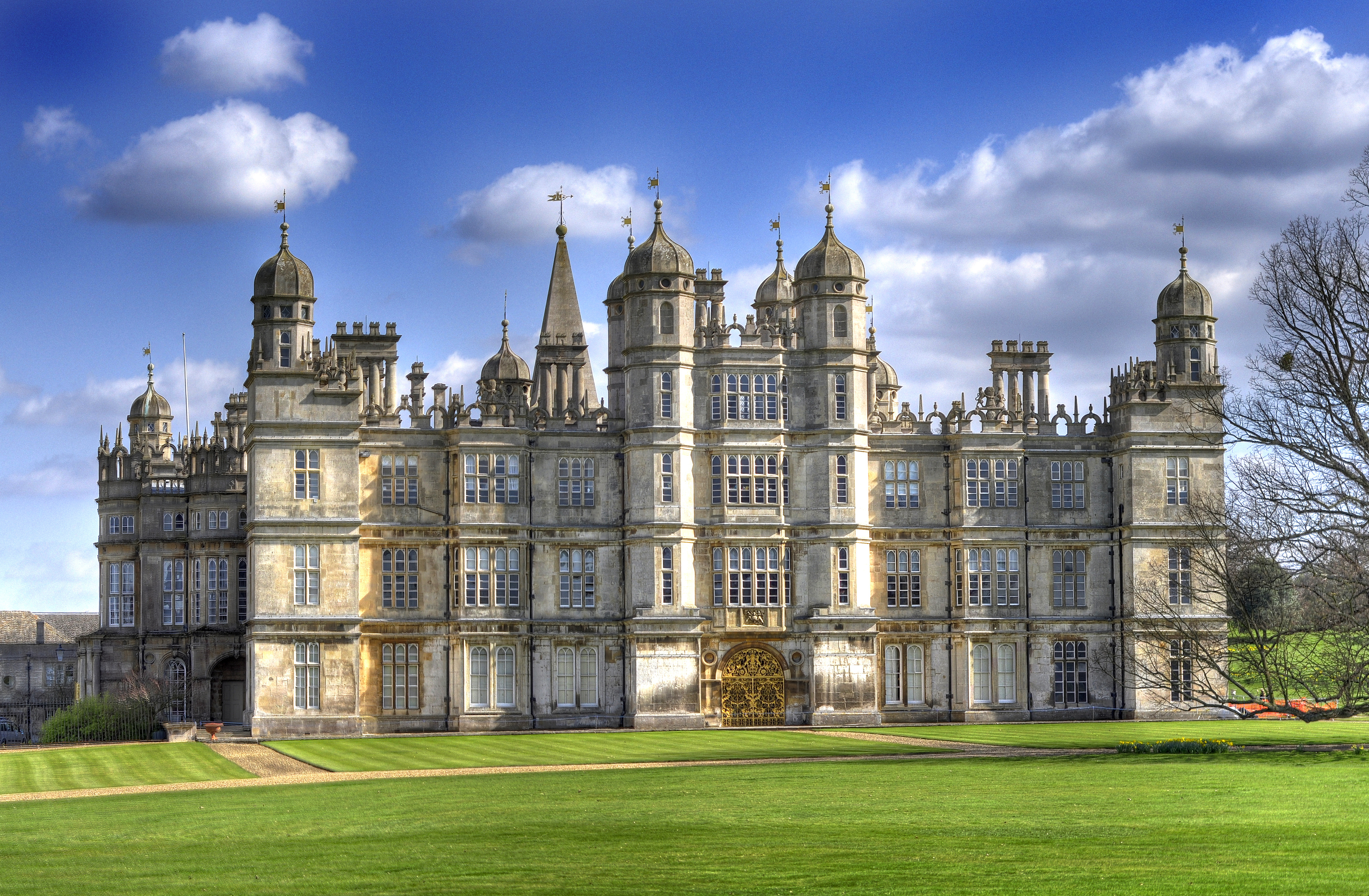
Front of Burghley House in 2009

"The Elizabethans saw architecture as a reflection of power, and for a great potentate, such as Queen Elizabeth I's Lord High Treasurer, William Cecil, a small house was unthinkable."

Burghley House was built on the site of an old monastery between 1550 and 1580.

The paintings Madonna and Child in a Landscape (1615/1620), by Orazio Gentileschi, and A Rose in a Glass (1730), by Herman van der Mijn, were contributed to the exhibition. Also contributed were three Italian boxwood statuettes of Lucretia, Cicero, and Cleopatra, by anonymous artist(s).

Another carving in the house, not on exhibition, is "A carved limewood relief of a dead bird" (late 18th Century) by Jean Demontreuil.

=== Wilton House ===
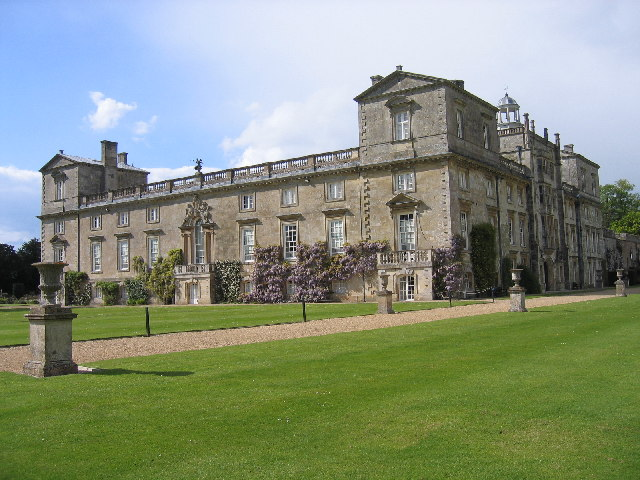
Wilton House in 2005

The earls of Pembroke and Montgomery built Wilton House on lands granted them by Henry VIII, lands that had belonged to Wilton Abbey.

A relation, Philip Sydney, wrote his poem "The Countess of Pembroke's Arcadia" at the house. Sydney's nephews, the third and fourth earls, were patrons of Shakespeare, whose plays Twelfth Night and As You Like It were likely to have been first acted at Wilton. The First Folio of Shakespeare's plays was dedicated to them. William Kent's statue of Shakespeare, commissioned by the ninth earl for £100.18s.4½d, stands in the front hall of the house.

After a fire in 1625, the original Tudor house was rebuilt—by Inigo Jones, England's first Palladian architect—in the classical style of the Stuart court.

Wilton served as General Eisenhower's operations headquarters for the Normandy invasion in World War II, its Double Cube Room serving as the operations room for the Battle of Normandy.

That Double Cube Room contains the biggest painting by Anthony van Dyck, of the family of the fourth earl, who was Lord Steward to Charles I, but switched to the parliamentary side during the English Civil War. Charles I is said to have loved Wilton and stayed at the house every summer.

Other old-master paintings include Leda and the Swan, by Cesare da Sesto; The Virgin and Child With St. John and Catherine, by Parmigianino; A Man Amusing Children with a Rommel Pot, by Frans Hals; a nativity by Hugo van der Goes; and Christ, St. John, and Two Angels, by Peter Paul Rubens.

The 17th earl added contemporary works, including an early painting by David Hockney, The Pyramid of Giza.

=== Chatsworth House ===
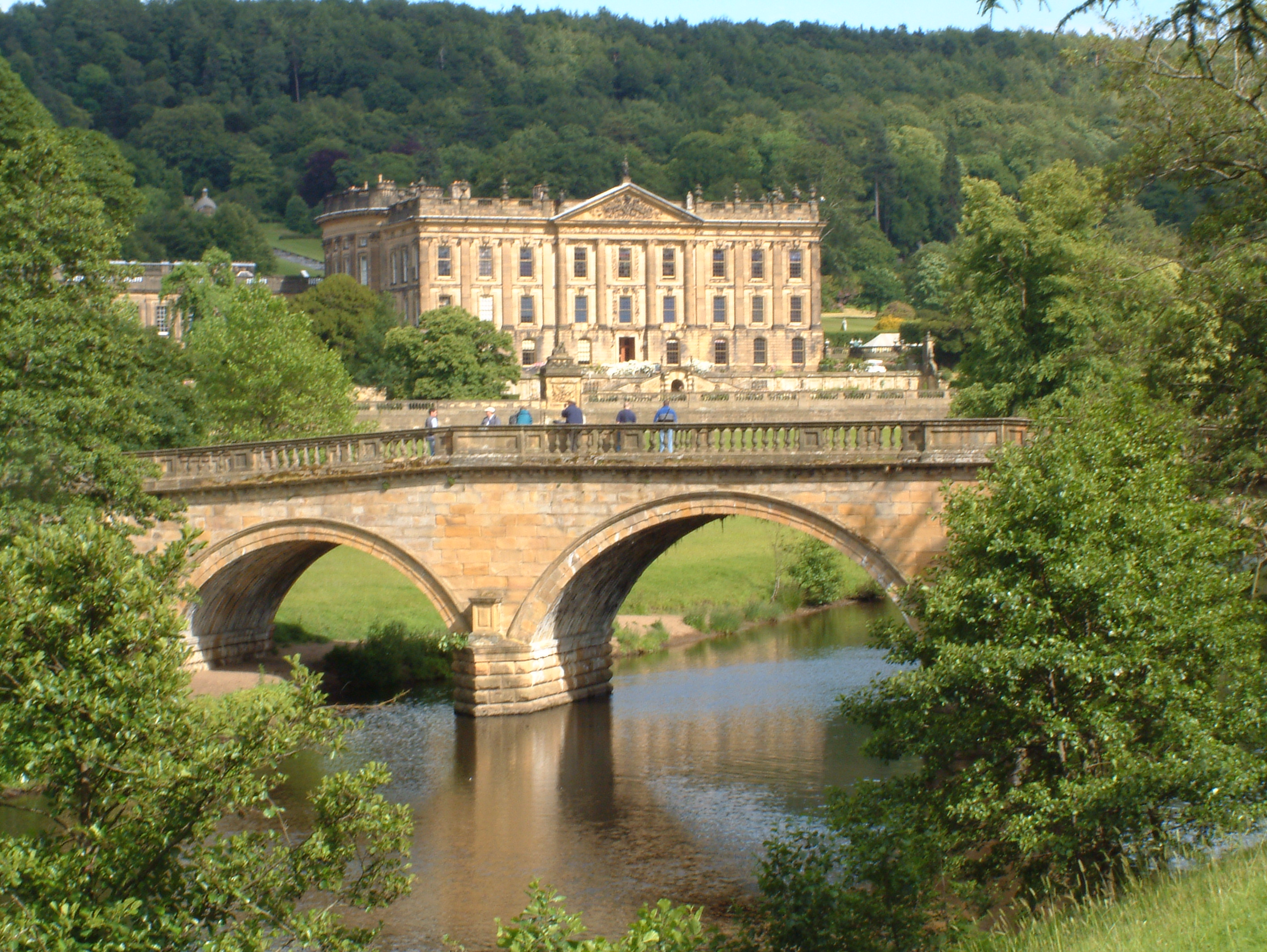
View of Chatsworth House and bridge from across River Derwent, Derbyshire, in 2002

"No house has a lovelier setting than Chatsworth House." The first house was built by Bess of Hardwick and William Cavendish at the end of the 16th century. When the first Duke of Devonshire greatly expanded the house, he laid out the gardens in the complex, 17th-century French style. In the 18th century, came an "educated nature", the way the English thought nature should look, the fourth duke bringing in Capability Brown, the greatest of all landscape gardeners. One hundred years later, Joseph Paxton, designer of The Crystal Palace, laid out walks and waterfalls.

The present gardens are the creation of Deborah, Duchess of Devonshire, who designed a serpentine beech hedge leading up to the statue of the sixth, bachelor duke, and who is "violently anti-Capability Brown" with regard to gardens, although in parks she thinks him "supreme". A formal garden she has built reflects the architectural plan of Chiswick House, which was designed by Lord Burlington and William Kent.

J. Carter Brown, director of the National Gallery of Art, which hosted the "Treasure Houses of Britain" exhibition in Washington, D.C., pronounced Chatsworth a "work of art" in the way it "sits in its landscape", and that indoors it has "elegance" but "a coziness, too". John Singer Sargent's painting Portrait of the Acheson sisters (1902)—of the granddaughters of Louisa Cavendish, Duchess of Devonshire, by her first marriage—is a favorite. Sargent was born an American but, like Henry James, tried to "out-English the English".

The first duke was a supporter of William III and the house has a collection of Delftware tulip vases. The fourth duke married the daughter of the wealthy connoisseur the Earl of Burlington, thereby doubling the family's possessions and estates. The sixth duke doubled the sized of the house, the great rooms of which were meant to proclaim the family's wealth and sophistication. George V and Queen Mary were the first monarchs to actually stay at the house.

The State Drawing Room contains tapestries designed by Raphael and a painting, by Edward Irvine Halliday, of the house being used as a girls' school during World War II, to avoid the grounds' being used to billet troops. The malachite table and urns were presents from Czar Nicholas I to the sixth duke. The Emperor's Fountain on the grounds being name in honor of the czar, who visited the house. Stamped leather wall coverings are also due to the sixth duke and include his portrait in the design.

== Program 2 – "Palaces of Reason and Delight" ==
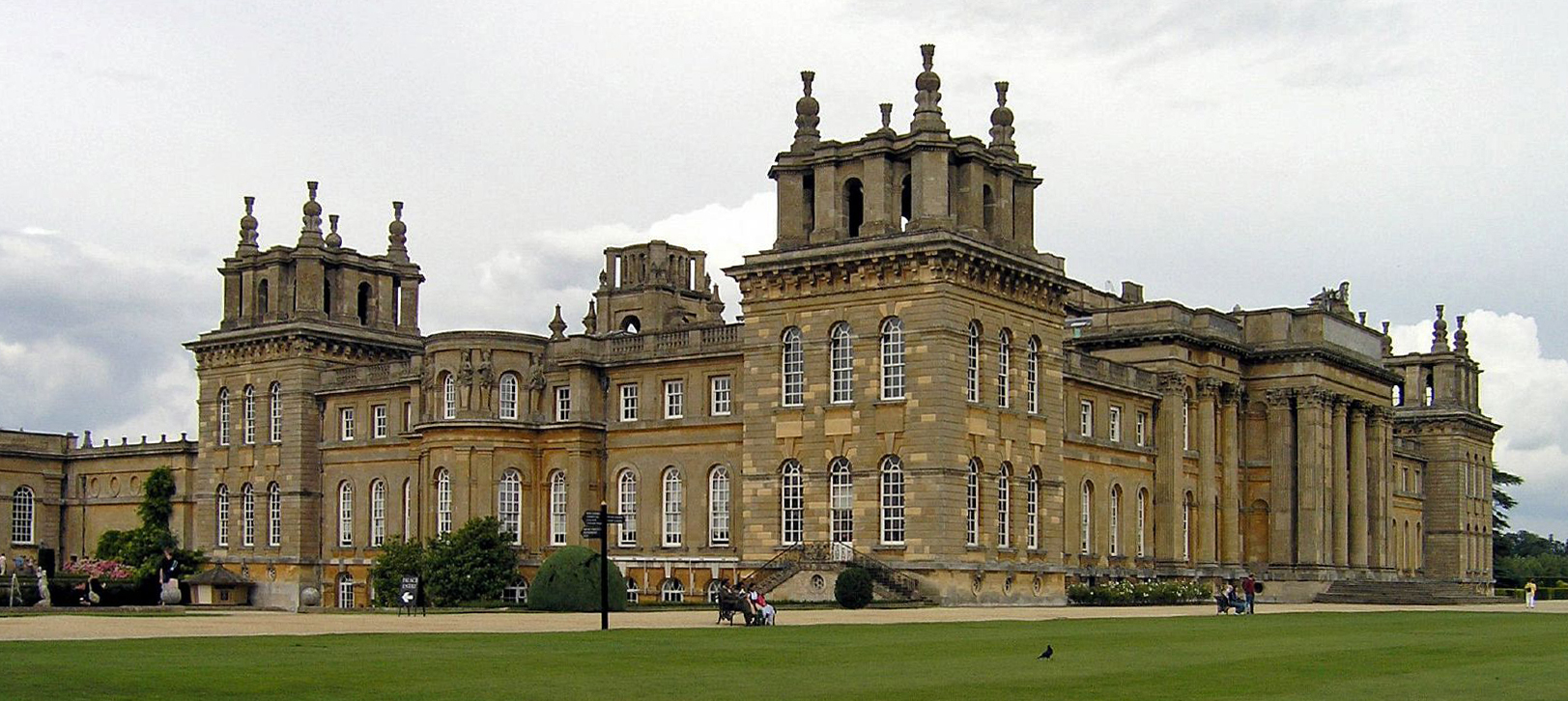
Blenheim Palace in 2010

=== Blenheim Palace ===
Blenheim Palace, designed by John Vanbrugh for John Churchill, 1st Duke of Marlborough, became a symbol of Britain's imperial destiny, its building heralding a century of prosperity and foreign expansion.

=== Houghton Hall ===
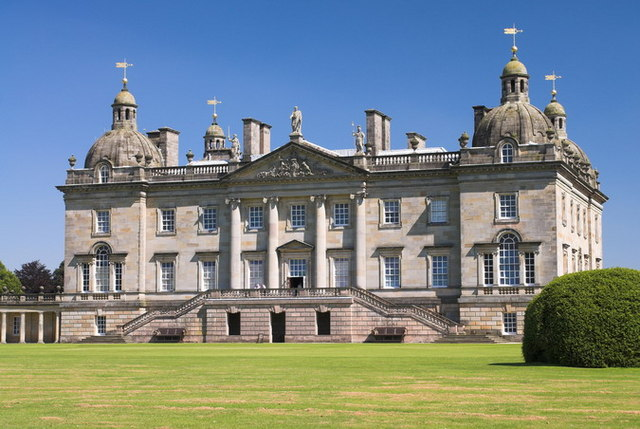
Houghton Hall in 2007

Houghton Hall, begun in 1721, was built by Marlborough's Secretary of War Robert Walpole, Britain's first prime minister. Not as large as Blenheim, it was a family house, whose design abandoned the baroque of Vanbrugh for the classicism of Andrea Palladio.

Houghton's small library, contains a day bed and, on the wall, a portrait of George I by Godfrey Kneller. The central stone hall was designed, as was the interior of the entire house, by William Kent, who had the help of the sculptor John Michael Rysbrack and the stuccoist Johann Baptist Atari. Antique dealer John Bly calls Kent the first true interior decorator. Kent was inspired by his meeting with Richard Boyle, 3rd Earl of Burlington, who became Kent's patron. Together they created decor such as the chairs in the saloon, covered in red Utrecht velvet, and those in the hall, covered in even rarer green velvet. The bronze laocoön in the hall is a copy by the French sculptor François Girardon. Kent's mahogany staircase is part of one of the first large-scale uses of that wood in a house.

Many important works of art were sold by Walpole's grandson to Catherine the Great, and many of those are still in the Hermitage Museum, but Kent's furniture was purchased by George Cholmondeley, 3rd Earl of Cholmondeley, the husband of Robert Walpole's daughter Mary, for £10,000. The house has a 1732 painting by William Hogarth of the Cholmondeley family, to whom the house eventually passed. George Cholmondeley, 5th Marquess of Cholmondeley's marriage to Sybil Sassoon, who is portrayed in John Singer Sargent's The Countess of Rocksavage (1922), brought her paintings to the house, including Jean-Baptiste Oudry's 1753 still-life The White Duck (stolen in 1990). Other fine pieces include a Louis XVI cabinet topped by a vase of flowers in Vincennes porcelain. The house contains two early (1754 and 1758–59) self-portraits by Thomas Gainsborough, plus his 1754–55 painting Mr. and Mrs. Browne of Tunstall, of two of the painter's Suffolk neighbors. Norwich's favorite painting in the house is Holbein's Portrait of a Lady with a Squirrel and a Starling (completed 1526–1528, purchased by the National Gallery in 1992).

In 1973, Sybil Cholmondeley restored the outside flights of step, which had been demolished by the 3rd earl, as a memorial to her late husband, with a Latin inscription (Note: SCALAE QVAS PERFECIT ROBERTVS WALPOLE DIMOVIT NEPOS ITERVM AD MDCCCCLXXIII EXSTRVCTAE PRISTINAM AEDIBVS HOVGHTONIANIS FORMAM REDDIDERVNT GEORGIVM MARCHIONEM QVINTVM DE CHOLMONDELEY COMMEMORANT [translated] "The stairs completed by Robert Walpole, removed by his nephew, were built again in 1973, to restore the original form of Houghton House, and rededicated to commemorate George, fifth Marquess of Cholmondeley.") by John Sparrow. Their son has a large collection of model soldiers, a collection, begun in 1928, that has come to number 20,000. Display cases include representations of the Prussian Gardes du Corps on parade; the Battle of Waterloo, where wool from Scotch sheep imitates the smoke of cannon fire; a skirmish in the Franco-Prussian War; and the Battle of Culloden.

=== Newark Castle ===
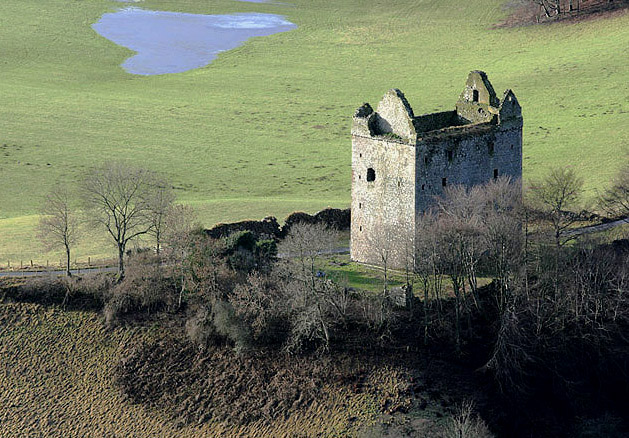
Newark Castle in 2009

The ruined Newark Castle, a hunting lodge of the Stuart kings of Scotland and fortress in the hills of the Scottish lowlands during a turbulent time, is near the cleuch (gorge, or ravine) where an ancestor of the dukes of Buccleuch and Queensbury saved King James I of Scotland from a charging male deer and thus gained the family title ('buck' + 'cleuch'). The building became known from being a setting for Walter Scott's The Lay of the Last Minstrel.

=== Bowhill House ===
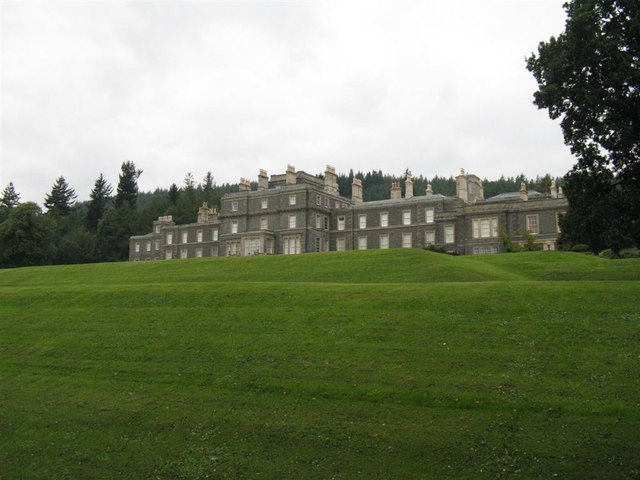
Bowhill House in 2008

Newark Castle is near to, and on the estate of, Bowhill House, which was built during the reign of George IV and is one of three great houses used by the Buccleuch family throughout the year. As the Buccleuchs were patrons of Walter Scott, who advised on the building's 19th century additions, this house contains many of his "relics", as well as an 1808 painting of Scott by Henry Raeburn and a sketch of him by Edwin Landseer. Scott's literary influence helped inspire the king to visit Scotland. The king, in return for Buccleuch hospitality, made a gift of his portrait by David Wilkie.

=== Drumlanrig Castle ===
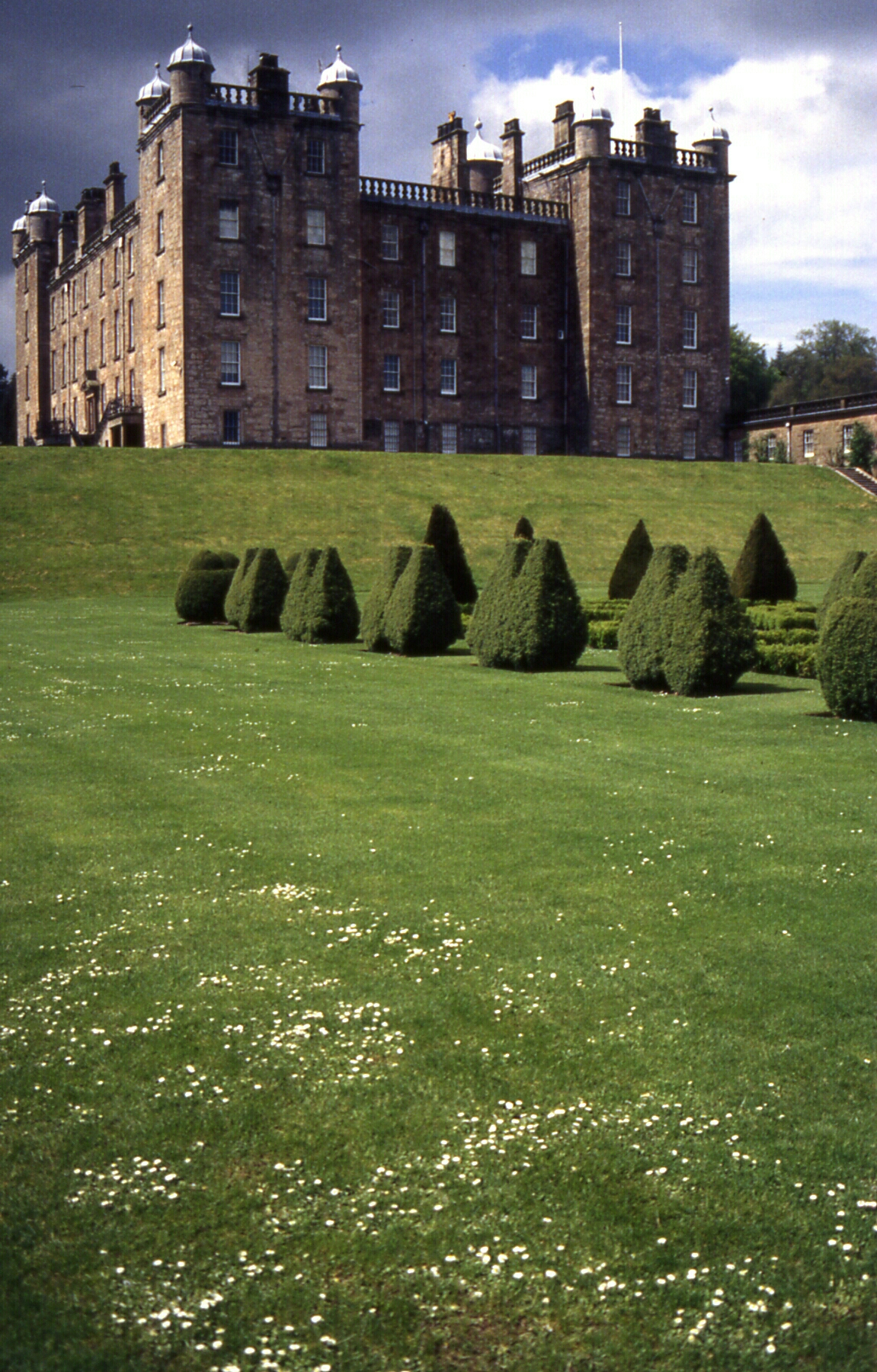
Drumlanrig Castle in 2011

Drumlanrig Castle is an ancestral home of the Douglases and came to the Buccleuchs through the marriage of the second duke to Jane Scott, Countess of Dalkeith. This house is a castle disguised as a palace. It is surrounded by gardens and parkland. The gardens are known as "Virginia" and "Barbados", and a 1692 sundial shows the directions of cities and ports in the New World, which transformed nearby Glasgow into an important British sugar and tobacco port, as well as enriching the surrounding countryside.

Treasures in the house include splendid 17th and 18th century silver. Canaletto's panorama of Whitehall—London, Whitehall and the Privy Garden looking North (c. 1747)—from the viewpoint of the present House of Commons site and showing Montagu House and St. Paul's Cathedral, proved so accurate that City of Westminster engineers had recently consulted it to determine the location of drains. Joshua Reynolds's portrait of Lady Caroline Scott as 'Winter' (1776) was impromptu, being started only when he saw the young girl come in from the winter's cold. (It is at Bowhill.) Leonardo da Vinci's Madonna of the Yarnwinder had vanished for 200 years (and subsequent to this program was stolen and recovered) which caused doubts of its authenticity until recently. Rembrandt's An Old Woman Reading (1655) is Norwich's favorite piece of the Buccleuch "treasures". He thinks it "one of the most sublime masterpieces of European art".

Other paintings include Hans Holbein's Portrait of Sir Nicholas Carew (1532–33), which wasn't completed until after Carew's execution for high treason. Several portraits are of James Scott, 1st Duke of Monmouth,—who was also 1st Duke of Buccleuch—and his close relations, as well as the shirt Monmouth wore to his execution and his magnificent saddlery and harness befitting his role as Master of the Horse. His Buccleuch title passed to his widow and their children. Objects in the house include those that Charles II had given Monmouth, who was his "favorite child", although illegitimate. These objects include a Gobelins cabinet (1675–1680) that, it is said, had originally been given to Charles II by Louis XIV of France, and which Charles gave to Monmouth as a wedding present. There is another, identical cabinet in the J. Paul Getty Museum, the museum doubting the stated provenance of the Buccleuch piece.

The survival of Drumlanrig depends on generating sufficient income from the surrounding estate: from crops such as corn and livestock, and from trees, the only renewable natural resource in the British Isles, which still has to import 90% of its requirements. The estate woodlands has hardwoods and conifers mixed together, the previous, 8th duke being an expert in the management of woodlands. A distant ancestor, during the 1830s, would plant trees in patterns that evoked the casting of shadows by clouds. The estate includes California redwoods, which grow well there. Grass, and heather higher up, also grow on the hills.

Conservation of the castle itself includes a second, once-every-150-year, lead re-roofing that will take 14 years and cost US$1 million, a duty required to make sure of the "chain of continuity" being kept intact. The duke's heir never had a "blinding, single moment" when he realized that he would be involved in running the estate, but was aware from an early age, although not feeling "pushed" toward it. He is especially interested in the paintings.

=== Boughton House ===
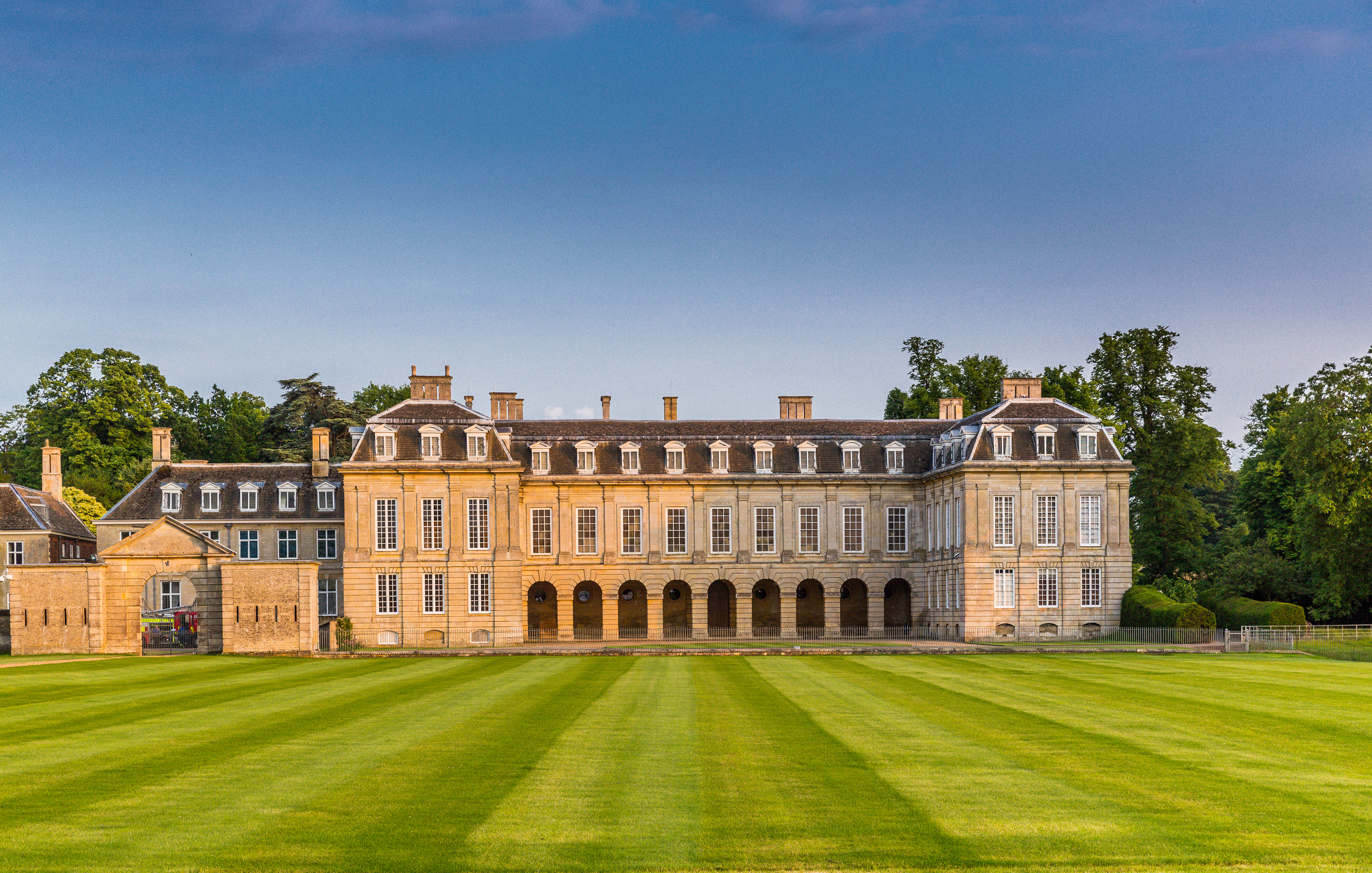
Boughton House in 2013

The Joshua Reynolds portrait of Elizabeth Montagu, at Drumlanrig, introduces Boughton House, as she was the heiress who brought that house into the Buccleuch family. Boughton's present appearance is due to Rafe Montagu, who was inspired by the Palace of Versailles. Behind the facade is evidence of its being a former monastery, including a small courtyard, known as "fish court", where the monks once kept a pool of carp, and around which are grouped the main rooms of the house.

The great hall had its hammerbeam ceiling changed to a barrel-vault painted by Louis Chéron. The drawing room has Meissen porcelain swans that had been made for Madame de Pompadour around 1745. There are two tables with Sèvres plaques affixed, one by Joseph Baumhauer and the other by Martin Carlin. The drawing room houses 38 paintings, or "sketches", by Anthony van Dyck, which are more accurate portrayals than his better-known work. These paintings originally belonged to the painter Peter Lely.

In the "rainbow room" are tapestries from the Mortlake Tapestry Works, which was rescued from bankruptcy by Ralph Montagu and whose weavers were French Huguenots, among the many who had left after Louis XIV's 1685 Edict of Fontainebleau. Among other textiles at Boughton are a set of three of the earliest carpets made in the British Isles: in 1583, 1584, and 1585. In the "little hall" are an early The Adoration of the Shepherds (16th century) by El Greco and Young Man in a Plumed Hat (c. 1584) by Annibale Carracci. Other painted portraits include that by John de Critz of Henry Wriothesley, 3rd Earl of Southampton (1603), who is often identified as Shakespeare's Fair Youth, and of his wife Elizabeth (c. 1600).

The duke is deluged with requests from museums and galleries, and was loaning 70 works of art to 18 exhibitions in one year, as well as permanent loans to British embassies and loans to government buildings in London.

=== West Wycombe Park ===
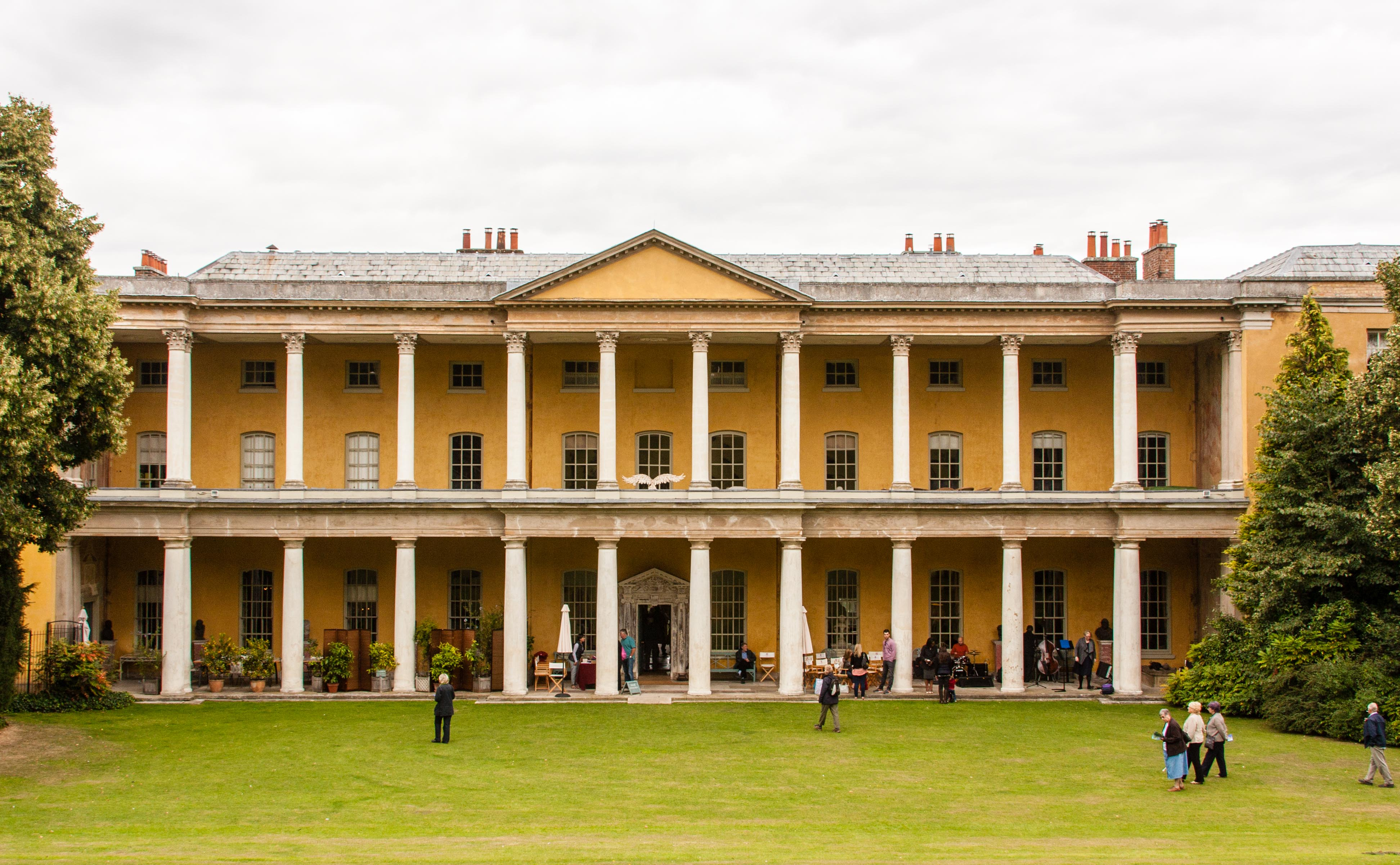
South Front of West Wycombe Park in 2014

West Wycombe Park was built in the 18th century by Francis Dashwood, 11th Baron le Despencer, who was from non-aristocratic family that had made its fortune in trade. He had visited France and Italy on the Grand Tour and was a founder of the Society of Dilettanti, as well as being a freemason, a founder of the Divan Club, and a member of the Hellfire Club, whose members no longer feared eternal damnation, dressed as monks and nuns, and engaged in sexual "hanky panky", in caves on the estate after using Medmenham Abbey, that would have meant jail or being burned at the stake for their grandparents and great-grandparents, and that permissiveness would have meant social ostracism for their grandchildren. Now, thousands of people visit the caves.

Dashwood could be a serious churchman and sought to compile a simplified, more rational Book of Common Prayer, in collaboration with Benjamin Franklin, that book being widely used by the Episcopal Church in the United States. Dashwood built St Lawrence's Church, West Wycombe, near his house. The church's architecture is not particularly religious, being more suitable to a "sumptuous great saloon"—"Palladian glory" befitting the Age of Reason.

Near the church is an outdoor mausoleum built by Dashwood for family and friends. Finished in 1765, it was financed by a £500 bequest from Lord Melcombe Regis. The architect was John Bastard of Oxford, who built the mausoleum for £495.18s.6d (Nicholas Revett being mentioned as well). The heart of Paul Whitehead was kept here, and shown to visitors, until stolen in 1839.

Paintings of West Wycombe Park were done by William Hannan and Thomas Daniell. The estate includes a lake where mock sea battles were fought and a rotunda where George Frideric Handel's music was played. The gardens are being restored to how they were, including opening up the "ride" above the house, at the top of which a statue of a Roman horseman was erected, the statue being purchased from Pinewood Studios for £100. The inside of the house is being restored, as well, whose statuary and pictures are of the sort acquired on a Grand Tour. The ceiling of one room is painted with a scene of Venus and Bacchus. The house's exterior double loggia is rare. The house is not a proclamation of status as such a house once would have been; it is instead a "theatre of delight".

=== Syon House ===
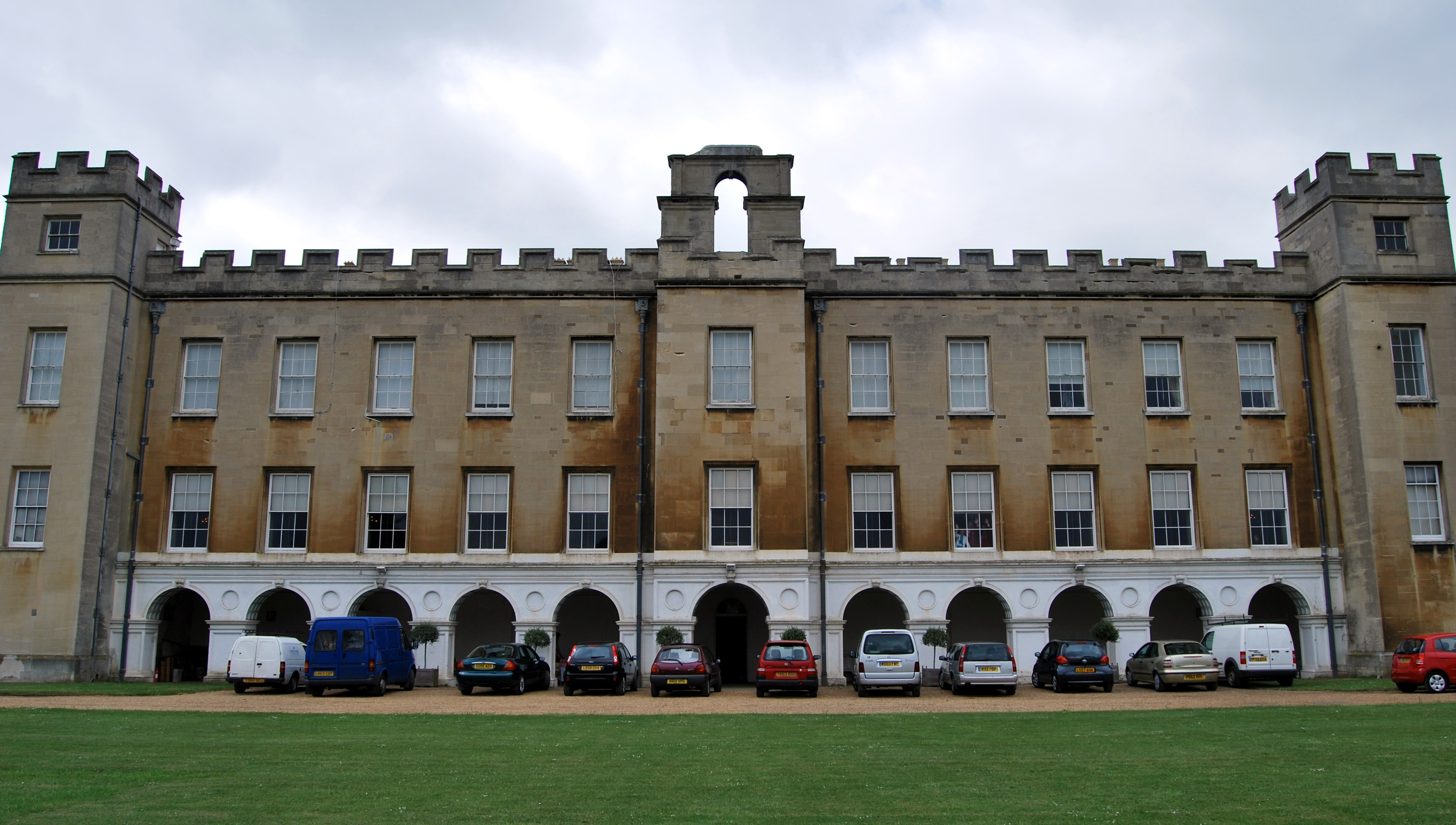
Syon House in 2010

Located on the River Thames in the western outskirts of London on the site of a former convent, (Note: "A Brigittine convent, dissolved by Henry VIII and later given to the Percy family...largely rebuilt by the 9th Earl of Northumberland early in the seventeenth century. Though refaced in stone in the nineteenth, the exterior still looks much as [painter Jan] Griffier depicted it [in the late 17th century]...") Syon House came to represent the climax of Britain's 200-year fascination with Rome that began in the late Elizabethan era. In the 18th century, remodeling the interior to its present state was begun by Hugh Percy, 1st Duke of Northumberland, who commissioned neoclassical architect Robert Adam. However, Adam's designs came to be limited to five principal rooms and two smaller ones.

Statuary in the entrance hall (or Great Hall) includes an Apollo Belvedere, a model of classicism; a statue of Cicero, whose philosophy was a "cornerstone" of an 18th-century education; and a Dying Gaul, which was symbolic of a recently defeated France. From the "chilly" entrance hall to the Ante Room is like "walking into a jewel". The green (verde) columns were dredged up from the Tiber, and the effect is of leaving the "cold, austere" Roman Republic for the "sumptuous, opulent Rome of the Empire", and signifying that Britain's ruling class was comparable to that of Rome's. The dining room is restrained by comparison with the Ante Room; but it is elegant, with apses at each end, screened by Corinthian columns and a series of antique statues along the inside wall, with a chimney piece in the center, exemplary of Adam "at his best". With the coming political and industrial revolutions, was this the end of an epoch?

== Program 3 – "Recapturing the Past" ==
=== Belvoir Castle ===
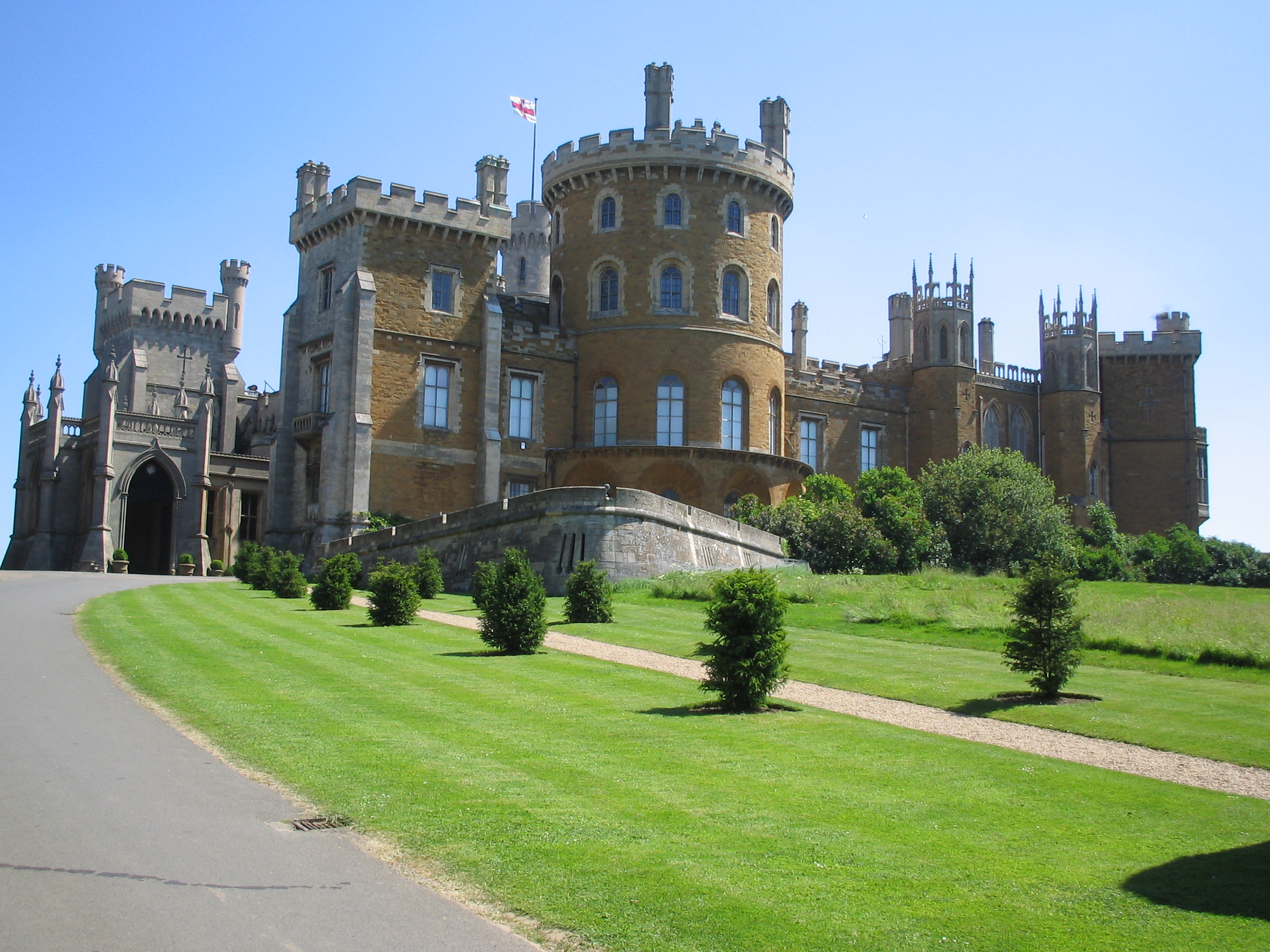
Belvoir Castle in 2006

Belvoir Castle is owned by the Dukes of Rutland, relatives of Norwich, who remembers Christmas-time dinners of 35–40 guests, and refers to children in a painting by James Jebusa Shannon as aunts and uncles. A punch bowl in the painting, large enough for one of the "aunts" to be sitting on, was bought in 1682 and is the earliest of its kind in Britain. An even more important piece is the silver-gilt ewer and basin set with carnelians or agates, which dates from 1581–82, when, before knives and forks were generally used, handwashing after a meal was necessary. It is possibly the finest work of art in the castle.

Other works of art include a 16th-century painting of Henry VIII, which is "almost certainly" by Hans Holbein; a series of paintings, the Seven Sacraments, painted between 1637 and 1640 by Nicolas Poussin; a version of the 17th-century Flemish Proverbs—painted by David Teniers the Younger, who was inspired by the Breughel paintings on the theme—a painting that is no longer at Belvoir. The paintings are displayed in a room that is one of the earliest in England designed especially for that purpose, including being lighted from above, which is due to the fifth duke's wife, Elizabeth Manners, Duchess of Rutland, who started to rebuild the house in 1801.

Elizabeth Manners's statue, by Matthew Cotes Wyatt, is in the Elizabeth Saloon, the grandest of the castle's reception rooms being named for her. The saloon echoes the Versailles of Louis XV, with the sun-in-splendor replaced by the Rutland peacock. The ceiling painting once contained a likeness of the future king George IV, when he was prince regent, engaged in voluptuous pleases, a likeness that was changed when the prince objected, the prince being a frequent guest. Among the statuary at Belvoir are busts of Oliver Cromwell, William Pitt, 1st Earl of Chatham and his son William Pitt the Younger, and John Manners, Marquess of Granby, who was a general noted for caring for his men.

=== Plas Newydd ===
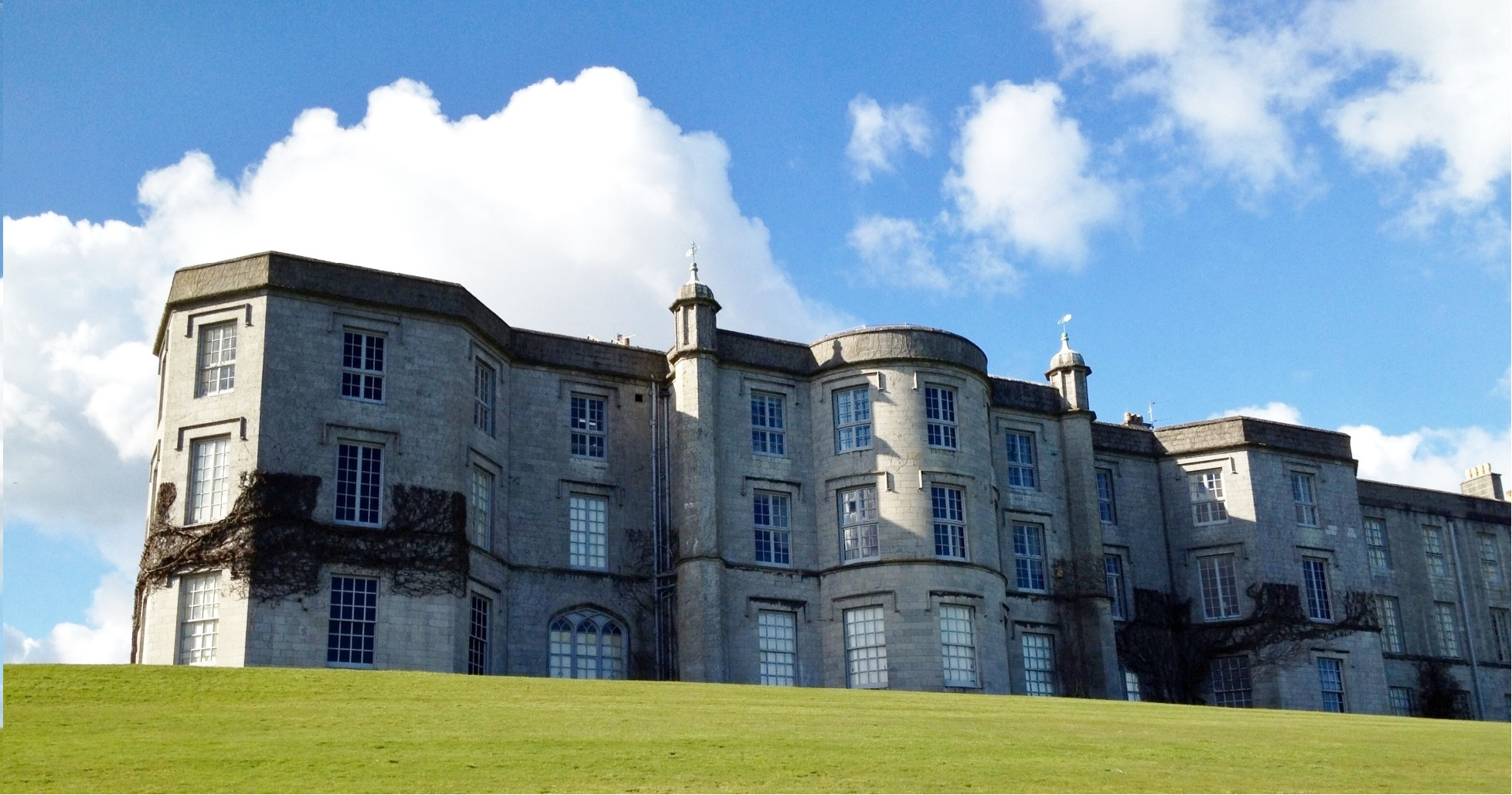
Plas Newydd in 2013

Plas Newydd, on the Isle of Anglesey, contains a museum memorializing the Battle of Waterloo, the marquess being a descendant of Henry Paget, 1st Marquess of Anglesey, the Duke of Wellington's cavalry commander at the battle, who lost part of his leg during the battle and was eventually fitted with the earliest articulated prosthetic leg, invented by James Potts around 1830 (video says 1820). Belgian painter Constantinus Fidelio Coene produced a romanticized version of the incident and Franz Xaver Winterhalter painted a portrait of the 1st marquess.

The American and French revolutions and the Napoleonic Wars that followed gave impetus to radical changes in taste that were termed Romanticism, of which Plas Newydd became a manifestation, when it was redone in order to reclaim a heroic past, by architect by James Wyatt, with the dining room–ballroom done in Gothic Revival and all the other principal rooms in the Neoclassical style. The house already had a splendid location, overlooking the Menai Strait and the mountains of Snowdonia.

A painting by Richard Barrett Davis shows Queen Victoria, early in her reign, with many Anglesey courtiers, including the 2nd marquess, before Prince Albert got rid of many of them. The "mad marquess" turned the chapel into a theater in Art Nouveau style, where he put on extravagant performances. His cousin who succeeded him turned the space into guest bedrooms, each with a bathroom. A frequent guest to the house was the artist Rex Whistler, whose rebuses, juvenalia, paintings, and reversible faces (OHOs) are on display in a room set aside as a museum. Capriccio—an enormous mural by Whistler, his last finished mural—decorates the dining room, from whose windows the Menai Suspension Bridge, a symbol of the Industrial Revolution, can be seen.

=== Penrhyn Castle ===
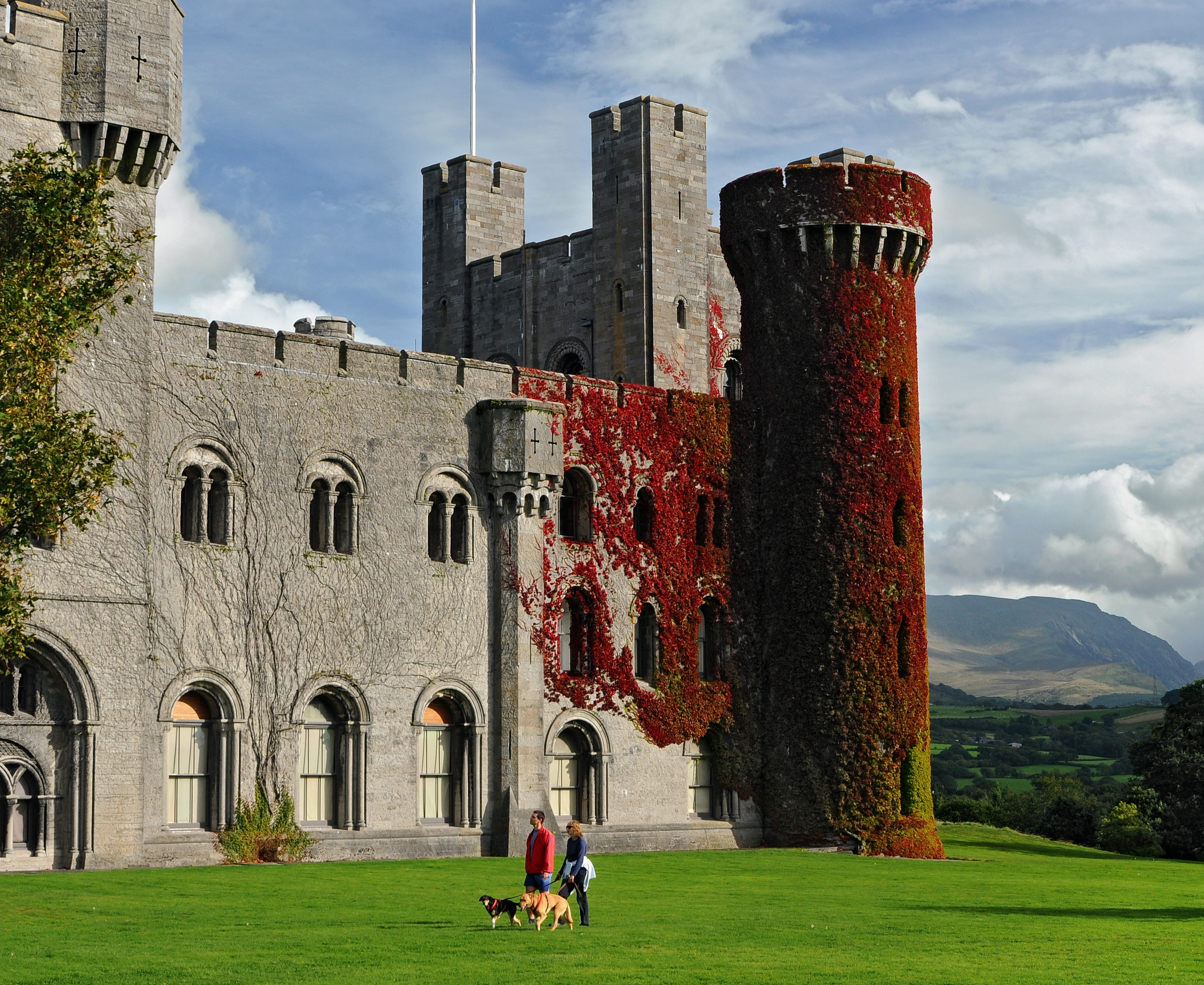
Penrhyn Castle in 2011

The Industrial Revolution and the slate quarries of Snowdonia helped provide George Hay Dawkins-Pennant with the wealth to construct, between 1822 and 1837, Penrhyn Castle in the Norman Romanesque style, a house that is more romantic and an expression of riches—as Hardwick Hall is—than scenic or comfortable, a house that is so well crafted and monumental, even if an unoriginal pastiche, that it has been accepted by the National Trust.

=== Wightwick Manor ===
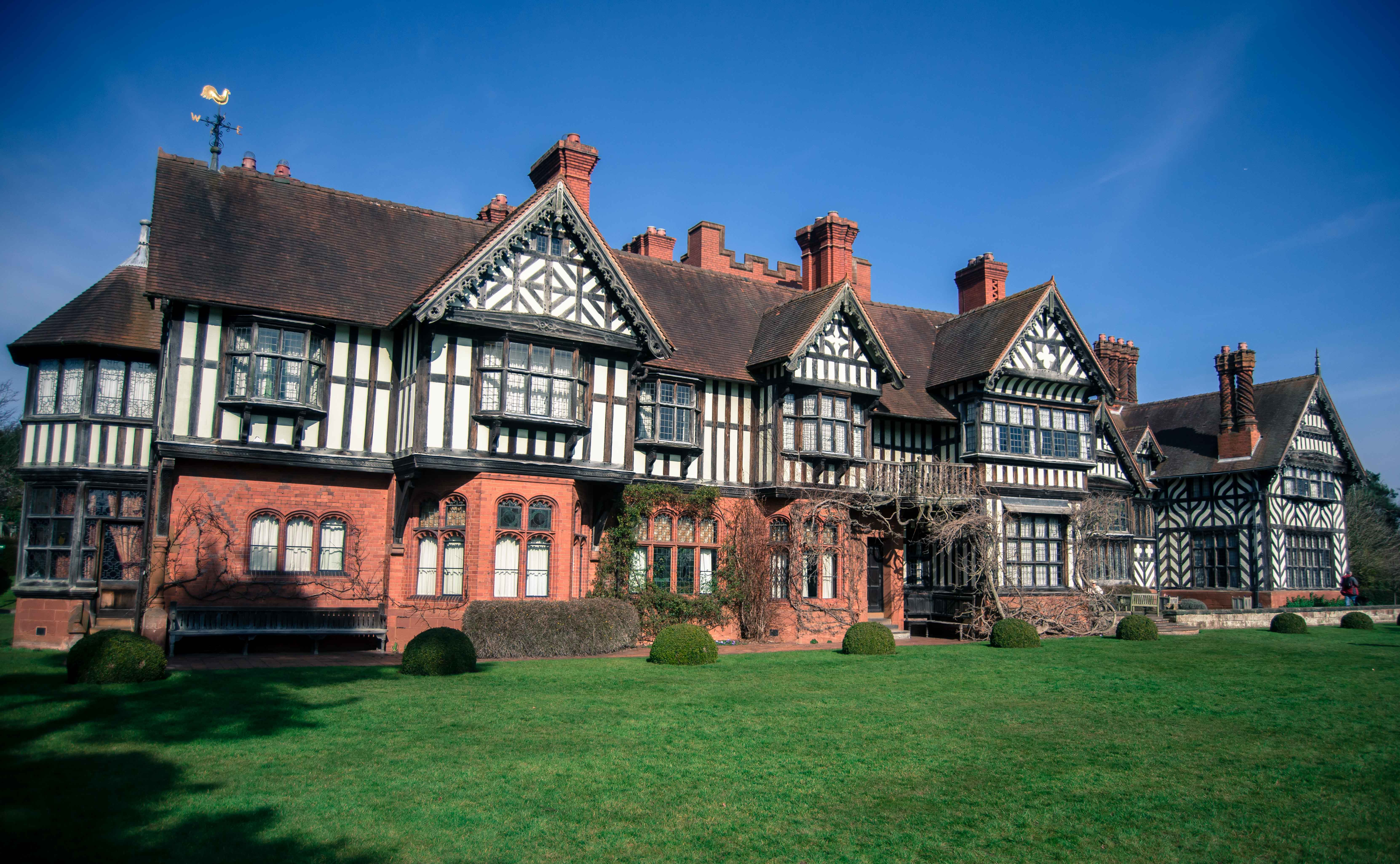
Wightwick Manor in 2016

Wightwick Manor was built by (Samuel) Theodore Mander, in the 1880s, in the timber-frame style of the West Midlands of the 16th to 17th centuries, with a meticulous attention to detail, both inside and out. The house is also an example of the Arts and Crafts movement of the late 19th, and early 20th, centuries, the movement where William Morris and others influenced taste in many arts, looking to the past for inspiration, escaping the ugliness of the Industrial Revolution by looking to the early Renaissance and Medieval times and the integrity of dedication to craftsmanship.

The Great Parlor, the house's focal point, contains Edward Burne-Jones's 1894 painting Love Among the Ruins. Charles Eamer Kempe decorated the room's ceiling in the "Medieval manner" and painted a plaster frieze just below, a frieze inspired by that of Hardwick Hall.

Rosalie, Lady Mander—the daughter-in-law of Wightwick's builder, the house's occupant, and a biographer of Dante Gabriel Rossetti—is an expert on the period, although she once preferred Georgian to Victorian design. A bedroom contains many studies by Burne–Jones hanging on one wall, the other walls covered by acanthus wallpaper, and a bedspread made by May Morris. The nearby Oak Room contains a folding bed that once belonged to Algernon Charles Swinburne, above which are panels painted after those by Rossetti.

Simon Taylor, an expert on Victorian painting from Sotheby's, tells of Morris's wanting his houses to each have a great hall, inspired by the Medieval baronial hall. He tells of Burne–Jones and Morris meeting at the University of Oxford in the 1850s; that both had elements of escapism in their work; and that Burne–Jones saw Love Among the Ruins as a romantic, unreal dream. Rosalie Mander points out the prominence of the briar rose in the picture and the care taken with the framing. The house contains a facsimile of the Kelmscott Chaucer (the press's name being derived from Morris's rented country house), as well as originals of Morris's capital letters and Burne–Jones's illustrations used in the book.

The authenticity of Medieval influence in Morris's wallpaper and textiles is due to its designs being taken from nature and old tapestries and the use of the same colors and vegetable dyes as used in the past. Wall tiles by William De Morgan, incorporated into the parlor's Renaissance fireplace, are of imaginary Medieval beasts may be inspired by similar beasts in Lewis Carroll's rooms at Oxford, where he and De Morgan had known each other since student days. Another example of De Morgan's work is a round dish glazed using a still secret formula. There is stained glass is by Kempe that incorporates a verse from Morris's The Earthly Paradise.

=== Lindisfarne Castle ===
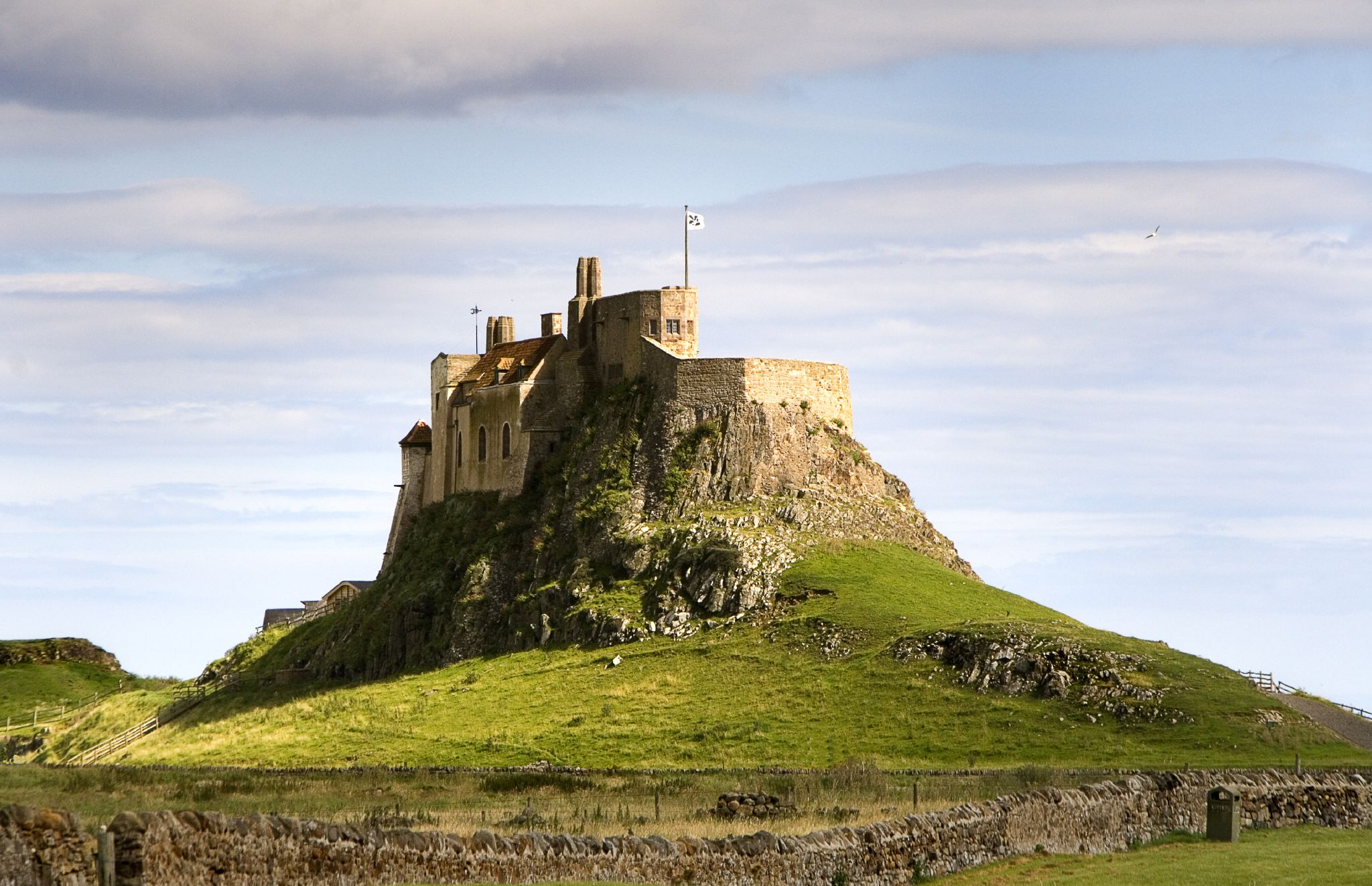
Lindisfarne Castle in 2007

Lindisfarne Castle is on Holy Island, Northumberland, an important center of early Christianity in England, which produced the Lindisfarne Gospels. Around 1900, Edward Hudson, the publisher of Country Life magazine, became interested in the derelict Medieval fort on a hill on the island and commissioned Edwin Lutyens to design a country house there. The daughter of the original, 1903 caretakers, Linda Lilburn, lived her life in, or in sight of, the castle. She remembers flowers decorating the castle and the views of the sea.

A painting of the Spanish Armada, titled The Invincible Armada, serves as backdrop to the wind vane pointer above the fireplace in the entrance hall is. Armada ships had been wrecked on the nearby coast during their retreat. The piers of the entrance hall are like those of nearby Durham Cathedral, whose founder, Saint Cuthbert, lived on Holy Island in the 7th century. Lutyens saw to the careful molding of the arches, the choice of furniture, selecting his favorite blue and white porcelain, and to the design of the door latches. The kitchen remains unchanged, which makes for hard work, with no back entrance, everything being brought through the front, including some heavy furniture designed by Lutyens.

The National Trust administrators were David and Susan Robinson, whose first impression was the daunting power of the castle from approaching it up the side, with many visitors thinking there's nothing inside, where narrow corridors and deep tunnel vaults emphasize the role of fortress the house once had. Deeply cut windows, with seats for enjoying views of the surrounding marsh and sea, and a brass chandelier and model ship that hang from the hall ceiling, are reminiscent of Dutch interiors that inspired Lutyens. The dining room has a blue end wall that sets off the handmade copper, pewter, and brass utensils place by the architect. The same craftsmanship is found in the music room, where the cellist Guilhermina Suggia would play, with locals standing outside the castle to listen.

The living conditions were Spartan: there was no central heating, exquisitely designed but small fireplaces, and few bathrooms. The sense of living in a fortress is relieved by the long gallery, the sunniest room, where Hudson and his guests would gather—guests that included the Prince and Princess of Wales, H. H. Asquith, and Lytton Strachey. Although Strachey hated the house, others—including its caretakers and many visitors, as gleaned from their guestbook comments—saw the house as a very desirable place to live.

=== Haddon Hall ===
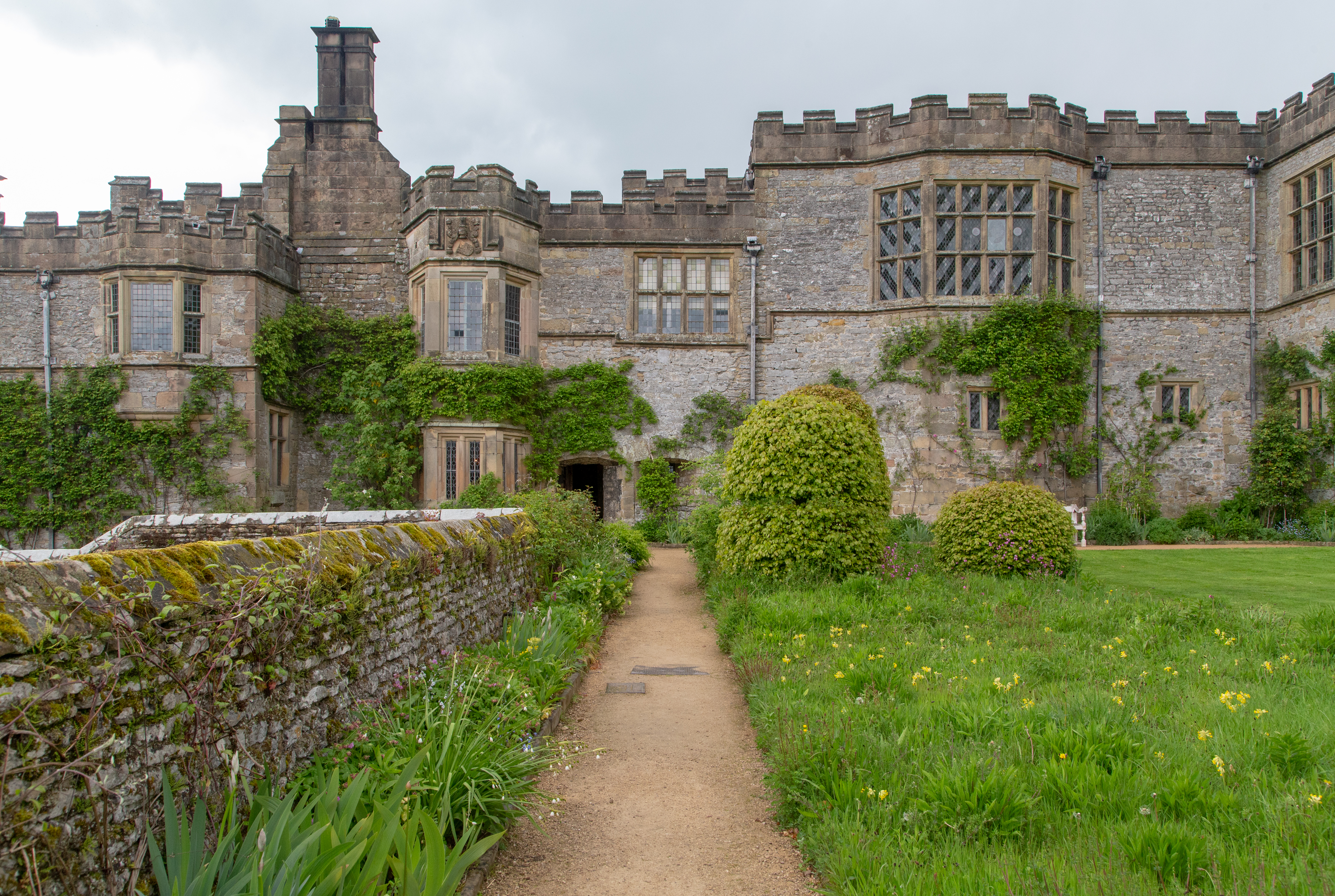
Haddon Hall in 2019

Norwich's uncle, John Manners, 9th Duke of Rutland, an antiquarian and a scholar, took great pains to restore Haddon Hall, having lived there, with his wife, before inheriting the title, they being the first of the family to reside there in over 200 years. The house originally belonged to the Vernon family. According to myth, In the 16th century, Dorothy Vernon, the daughter of Sir George Vernon, eloped with John Manners, a son of Thomas Manners, 1st Earl of Rutland, escaping across the eponymous Dorothy Vernon Bridge over the River Wye. (Note: "...begun in the twelfth century and with additions made up to the beginning of the seventeenth: a mass of towers, battlements, chimneys, and ancient mullion windows, rising above the little river Wye.... The restoration of the Hall was the life's work of the 9th Duke of Rutland (1886–1940), who approached the task with the greatest knowledge and sensitivity...") If indeed the elopement happened, the couple were soon reconciled with Sir George, as they inherited the estate on his death two years later.

The lower courtyard is surrounded by buildings built from the 12th to the 15th centuries, with no architectural plan, except for the locally quarried yellow stone that serves to bind them together. The great tower that rises 50 feet (15 m) over the entrance was built by the autocratic George Vernon around 1530.

The chapel shows the dedication, scholarship, and care that went into the restoration. Its present raredos, or altarpiece—added during the restoration—is a 15th-century example of Nottingham alabaster. The remarkable wall paintings, which had been painted over, were gradually revealed, including an image of Saint Christopher carrying the Christ child across a river and a woodland scene that included improbable animals, such as monkees, with only a small part of its coloration remaining. A sculpture of the 9th duke's elder brother, who died in childhood, is the only modern work in the chapel. It was created by their mother (Norwich's grandmother), who was a talented amateur artist.

The dining room began, around 1500, as a semi-private room for the family, a fashion that began in the late Middle Ages. Originally twice as high, it was divided by a ceiling that was paneled and painted, around 1550 by George Vernon, with heraldic emblems, including the Talbot dog. A mark of loyalty was the placement of Henry VIII's arms over the fireplace, with the inscription, "Dread God and Honor the King". George Vernon also added a large alcove on the south side to catch the light, which is wood-paneled, with a frieze of heraldic emblems, and with carved portraits of him and his wife on panels below.

A short flight of steps carved from the root of a single tree lead to the early, 1550s, Elizabethan long gallery, whose floorboards are said to be from the same tree. The gallery was the scene of the ball on the night of Dorothy Vernon's elopement. The "extraordinary quality" of the sunlight entering the room from three sides is due to each diamond pane "three-dimensionally" set at angles to its neighbors, which produces changing "reflection and counter-reflection". Over the fireplace is an idealized landscape painting of 1932, View of Haddon Hall, Derbyshire, by Rex Whistler. (Note: "...the picture is a powerfully nostalgic vision of the continuity of English country house life, at a time when its future was seriously in doubt, and death duties and the decline of domestic service had already taken their toll.")

Outdoors, the rose bushes and the "sun glinting on those astonishing windows" justify the cliché of "time having stood still". It's easy to imagine the past under such circumstances. One is reminded that the Haddon of the twentieth century is due to "scholarship, dedication, and love". Norwich reminisces about catching his first rainbow trout from the Wye river bridge below and, where Belvoir means Christmas, Haddon means a "long, cloudless summer that goes on forever". Haddon is only one of hundreds of such houses, now open to the public, whose owners have matched the dedication shown at Haddon.
