= Burghley House =

Country house near Stamford, Lincolnshire, England

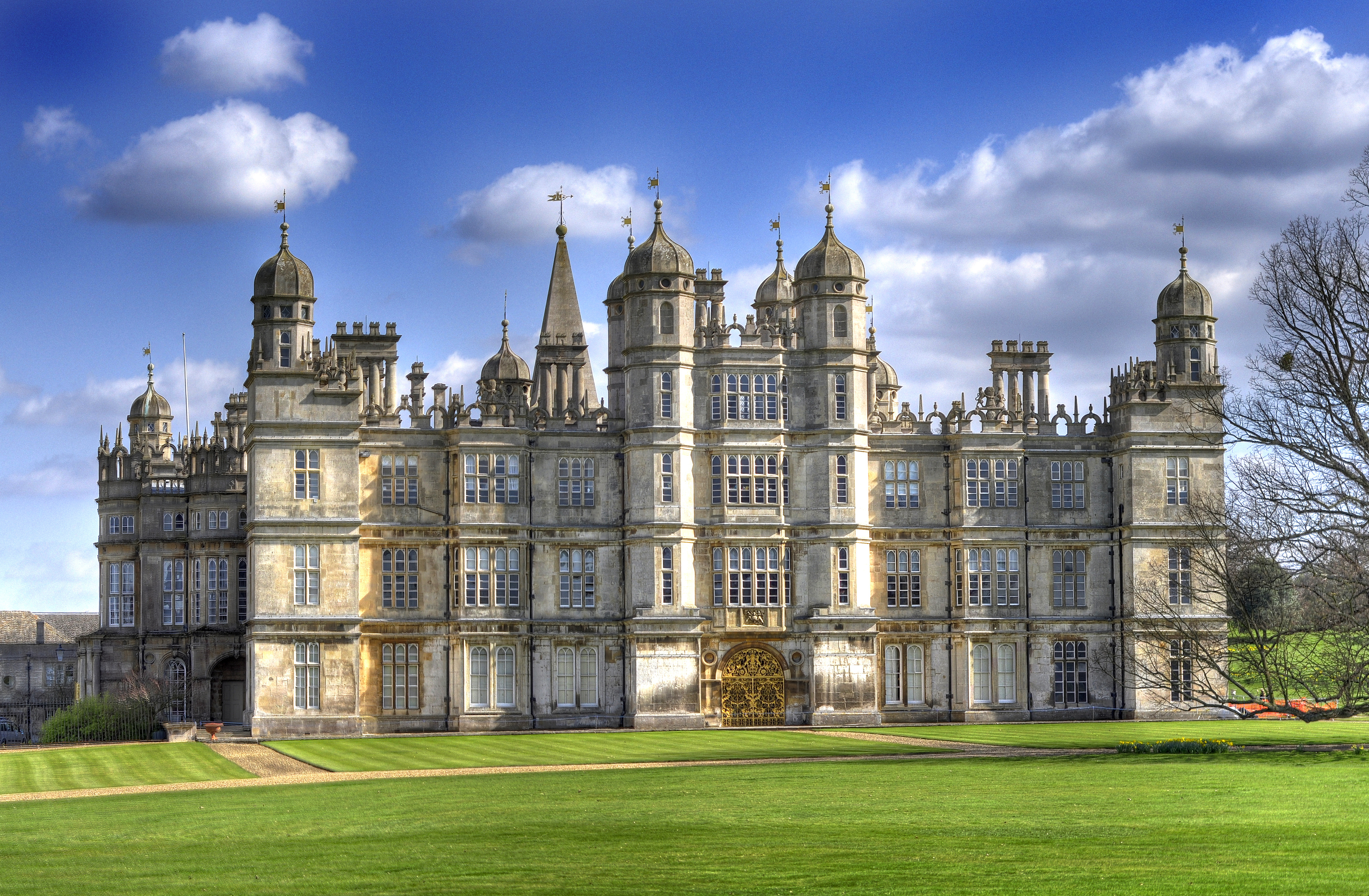
- The façade of Burghley House

- Location within Cambridgeshire
- 52°38′33″N 0°27′09″W
- Type: Prodigy house
- Location: Cambridgeshire, England

History
- Built: 1555–1587

Site notes
- Architect: William Cecil, 1st Baron Burghley
- Architectural style: Elizabethan
- Website: burghley.co.uk

Listed Building – Grade I
- Official name: Burghley House
- Designated: 16 January 1956
- Reference no.: 1127501

Listed Building – Grade I
- Official name: Stables with forecourt railings and service wings and servants wing, brewery and porters lodge
- Designated: 16 January 1956
- Reference no.: 1127502

Listed Building – Grade I
- Official name: The Orangery
- Designated: 16 January 1956
- Reference no.: 1127503

Listed Building – Grade I
- Official name: North Forecourt Area Railings and Gates at Burghley House
- Designated: 16 January 1956
- Reference no.: 1331234

National Register of Historic Parks and Gardens
- Official name: Burghley House
- Designated: 16 January 1985
- Reference no.: 1000359

Burghley House (/ˈbɜːrli/) is a grand 16th-century English country house near Stamford, Lincolnshire. It is a leading example of the Elizabethan prodigy house, built and still lived in by the senior (Exeter) branch of the Cecil family and is Grade I listed.

The exterior largely retains its Elizabethan appearance, but most of the interiors date from remodellings before 1800. The house is open to the public on a seasonal basis and displays a circuit of grand and richly furnished state apartments. Its park was laid out by Capability Brown.

The house is on the boundary of the civil parishes of Barnack and St Martin's Without in the Peterborough unitary authority of Cambridgeshire. It was formerly part of the Soke of Peterborough, an historic area that was traditionally associated with Northamptonshire. It lies 0.9 miles (1.4 km) south of Stamford and 10 miles (16 km) northwest of Peterborough city centre.

The house is now run by the Burghley House Preservation Trust, which is controlled by the Cecil family.

== History ==
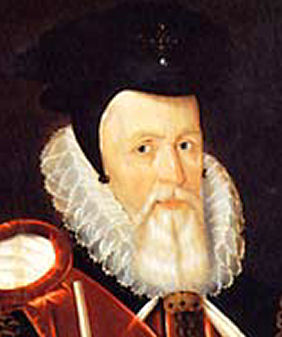
Lord Burghley was the chief advisor of Queen Elizabeth I for most of her reign.

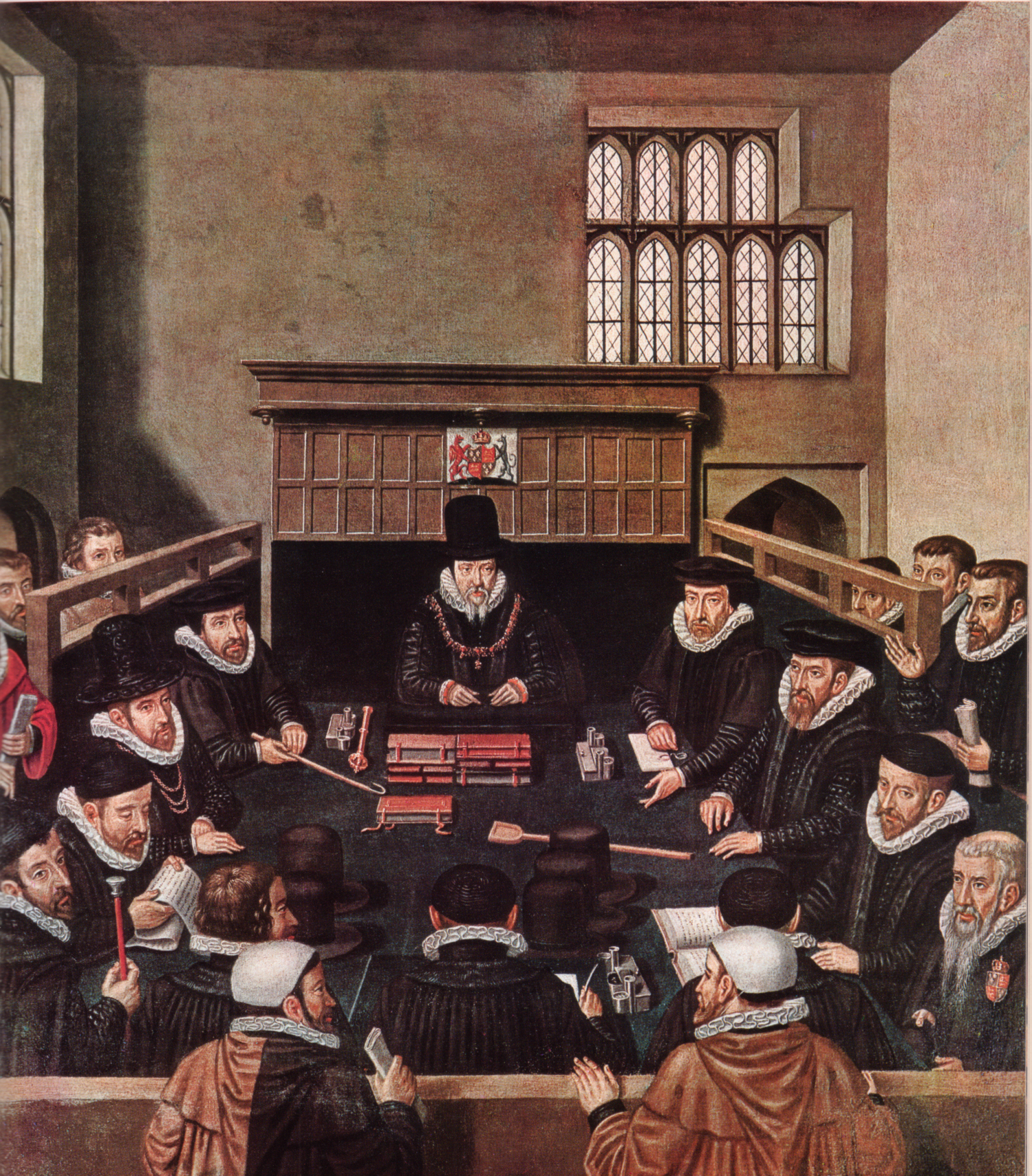
William Cecil presiding over the Court of Wards, c. 1585

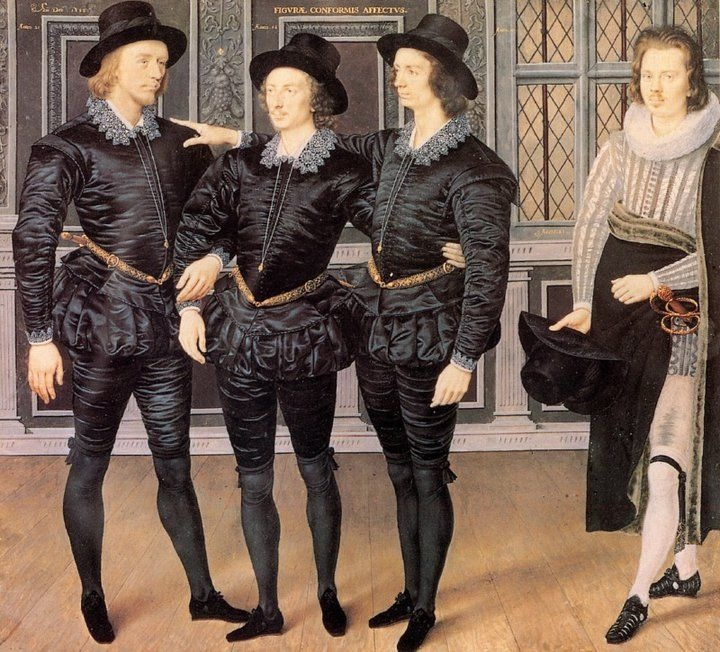
The Three Brothers Browne, by Isaac Oliver, 1598. L to R: John, Anthony, William; grandsons of Anthony Browne, 1st Viscount Montague who was implicated in the Ridolfi Plot in 1571, Burghley House Collections.

Burghley was built for Sir William Cecil, later 1st Baron Burghley, who was Lord High Treasurer to Queen Elizabeth I of England, between 1555 and 1587, costing £21,000 at the time. It was modelled on the privy lodgings of Richmond Palace. It was subsequently the residence of his descendants, the Earls, and since 1801, the Marquesses of Exeter. Since 1961, it has been owned by a charitable trust established by the family.

Victoria Leatham (b. 1947), antiques expert and television personality, followed her father, Olympic gold medal-winning athlete, IAAF President and MP, David Cecil, the 6th Marquess, by running the house from 1982 to 2007. The Olympic corridor commemorates her father. Her daughter, Miranda Rock, is now the most active live-in trustee. The Marquessate passed in 1988 to Victoria's uncle, Martin Cecil, 7th Marquess of Exeter (1909–1988), and then to his son, William Michael Anthony Cecil (b. 1935), both Canadian ranchers on land originally bought by the 5th Marquess, who have not lived at Burghley.

The house is one of the main examples of stonemasonry and proportion in 16th-century English Elizabethan architecture, reflecting the prominence of its founder, and the lucrative wool trade of the Cecil estates. It has a suite of rooms remodelled in the baroque style, with carvings by Grinling Gibbons. The main part of the house has 35 major rooms, on the ground and first floors. There are more than 80 lesser rooms and numerous halls, corridors, bathrooms, and service areas.

In the 17th century, the open loggias around the ground floor were enclosed. Although the house was built in the floor plan shape of the Letter E, in honour of Queen Elizabeth, it is now missing its northwest wing. During the period of the 9th Earl's ownership, and under the guidance of the famous landscape architect, Capability Brown, the south front was raised to alter the roof line, and the north-west wing was demolished to allow better views of the new parkland. A chimney-piece after the design of Venetian printmaker Giovanni Battista Piranesi was also added during his tenure.

The so-called "Hell Staircase" and its neighbour "The Heaven Room" has substantial ceiling paintings by Antonio Verrio, between 1697 and 1699. The walls to the "Hell Staircase" are by Thomas Stothard, who completed the work about a century later. The Bow Room is decorated with wall and ceiling paintings by Louis Laguerre.

== Art collection ==
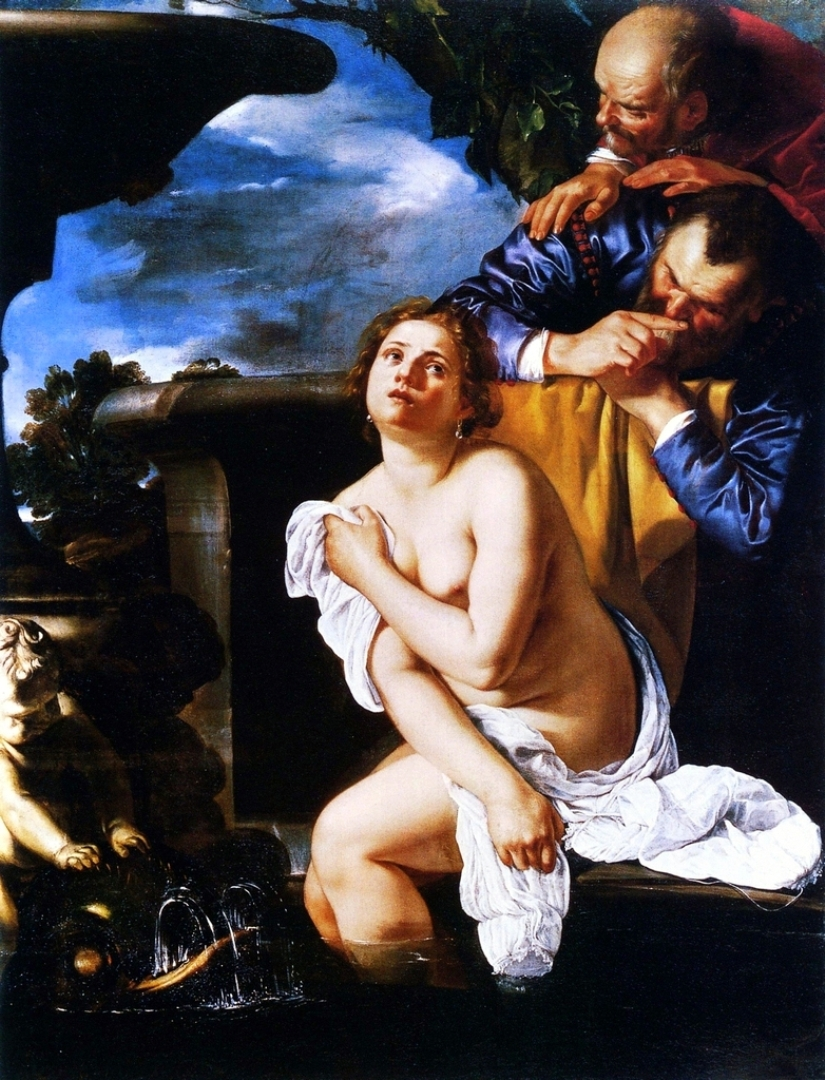
Susanna and the Elders (1622) by Artemisia Gentileschi

Although depleted of a number of important pieces by death duties in the 1960s, the Burghley art collections are otherwise mainly intact and are very extensive. The house still displays several hundred paintings, a large proportion of which are of the 17th century, bought in Italy by John Cecil, 5th Earl of Exeter (c. 1648–1700), and by Brownlow Cecil, the 9th Earl (1725–1793). They visited Italy eight times, bringing back large quantities of art. John Cecil purchased 300 works of art during his 22 years in Burghley and spent on his last visit to Europe £5,000 (c. £600,000 in 2017 currency).

The chapel has a large altarpiece by Paolo Veronese and his workshop, and two large paintings by Johann Carl Loth, a German painter active in Venice with few works in British collections. There are in total seven works by Luca Giordano, including a self-portrait.

In the Pagoda Room, there are portraits of the Cecil family, Elizabeth I, Henry VIII, and Oliver Cromwell. Many delicately painted walls and ceilings of the house were done by Antonio Verrio. The Billiard Room displays six oval portraits of members of the Order of Little Bedlam, the 5th Earl's drinking club.

The large collection of Japanese export porcelain is especially important because, almost uniquely, pieces still in the house, and others sold in 1888 and 1959, can be identified with pieces in an inventory of the house with several hundred ceramic items made in 1688. These are the "earliest recorded pieces in Europe" that can be documented in this way, and of great interest to scholars.

There are a number of outstanding pieces of furniture including work by celebrated 18th-century cabinet makers, Ince and Mayhew, in addition to silver, tapestry and collections of other porcelain, much of this is on public display in the state rooms, or display cases for the ceramics. A new "Treasury" space in the Brewhouse displays annually changing exhibitions highlighting aspects of the collections.

== Parkland ==
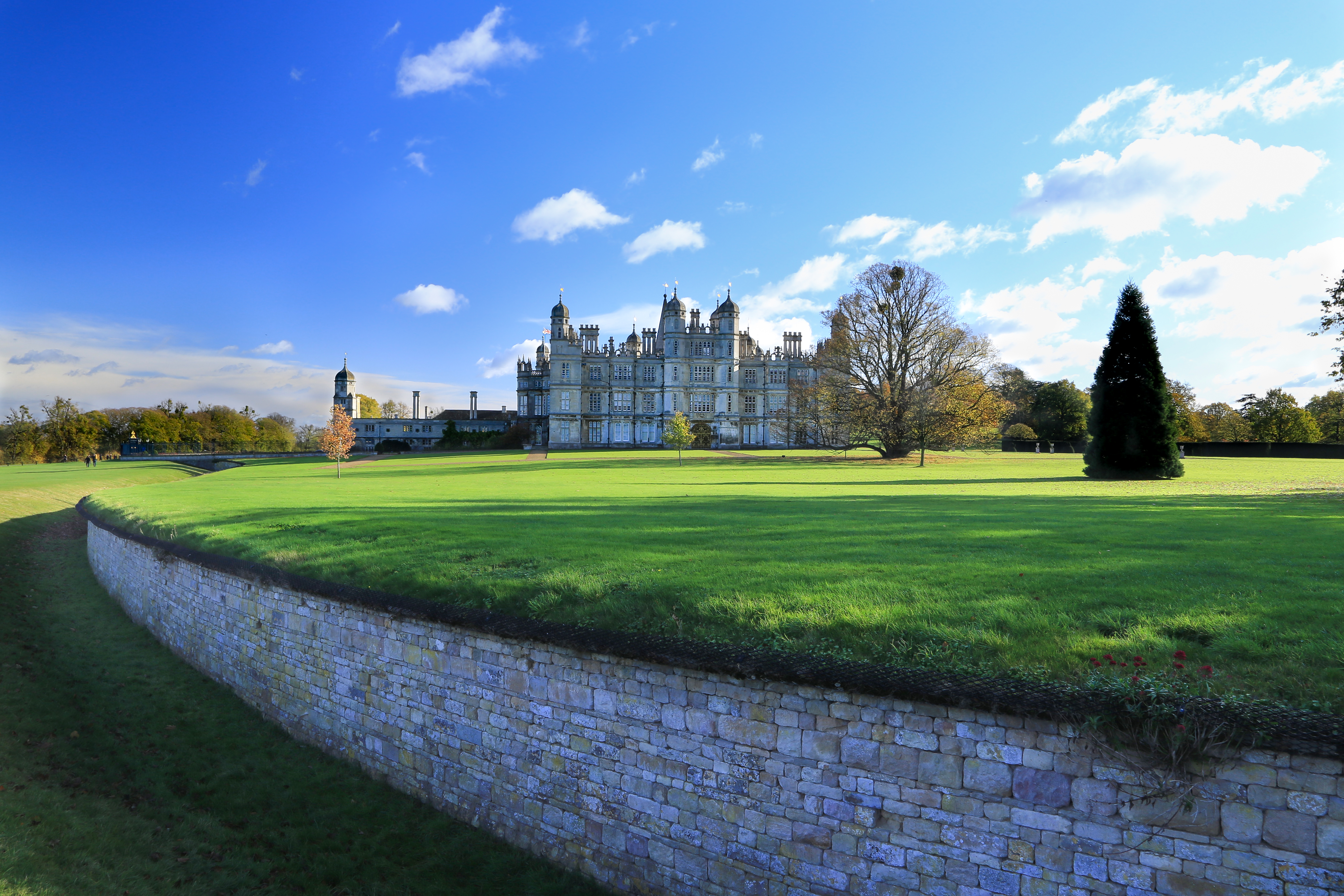
House from the ha-ha

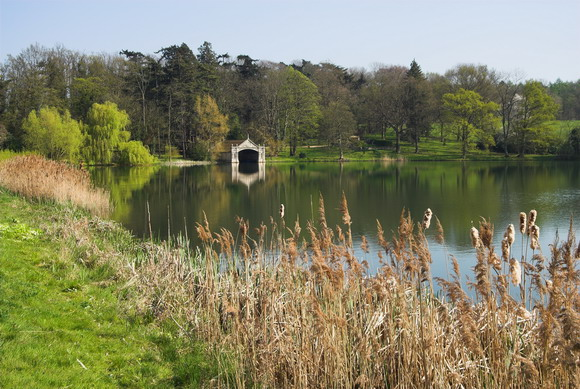
Part of the Grounds, lake and boathouse

The avenues in the park were all laid out according to the 1755–1779 designs by Capability Brown, paying due respect to pre-existing plantings, some of which were from the 16th century or earlier.

Brown also created the park's man-made lake in 1775–80. He discovered a seam of waterproof "blue" clay in the grounds, and was able to enlarge the original nine-acre (36,000 m^{2}) pond to the existing 26-acre (105,000 m^{2}) lake. Its design gives the impression of a meandering river. Brown designed the Lion Bridge at a cost of 1,000 guineas (£1,050 (Note: Brown's works costs equate to between £145000 (auto-generated on minimum basis) or £138,000 (2011) (Bank of England calculator).)) in 1778. He was paid £23,000 in total of the park designs in Burghley. Brown's landscape has been conserved by planting 30,000 new trees between 2012 and 2016.

Originally, Coade-stone lions were used as ornamentation. After these weathered, the existing stone examples were made by local mason Herbert Gilbert in 1844. Queen Victoria and her husband Prince Albert planted two trees to commemorate their visit.

As well as the annual Burghley Horse Trials, the park plays host to the "Burghley Run" for Stamford School and an annual meet for the Cambridge University Draghounds.

Recent developments have included starting a sculpture garden around the old ice house and, in 2007, a "garden of surprises" was created using traditional ideas of water traps, shell grottos and a mirror maze, but in a 21st-century style. The Burghley House trust has commissioned contemporary artwork in the grounds from leading artists.

The parkland and gardens of Burghley House are listed Grade II* on the Register of Historic Parks and Gardens.

== Today ==
The Lincolnshire county boundary crosses the park between the town of Stamford and the house. Burghley is located in the ancient Soke of Peterborough, once a part of Northamptonshire but now for ceremonial purposes in Cambridgeshire; for planning and other municipal functions the house is in the Peterborough unitary authority.

The house is a Grade I listed building, with separately Grade I listed north courtyard and gate. The listing document for the House provided this summary: "C19 and C20 formal gardens and pleasure grounds, developed from those originally designed by Lancelot Brown, surrounded by a park of C16 origins for which Brown provided extensive plans between 1754 and 1777".

The residents of the house since 2007 were Miranda Rock, director of the Burghley House Preservation Trust, granddaughter of the 6th Marquess of Exeter and daughter of Lady Victoria Leatham, with Orlando Rock (chairman of Christie's UK) and their family. Data before the COVID-19 pandemic indicated that the number of visitors to the site each year had almost doubled during Miranda Rock's tenure, to 110,000.

One of the more curious and prominent features of the house, is the presence of fourteen green sea turtle (Chelonia mydas) skulls on the wall in the kitchen. These are likely the remnants of the Victorian delicacy turtle soup, which heavily reduced green sea turtle numbers and eventually dropped out of favour with the upper classes.

== Filming ==
Burghley House has been featured in several films and television programmes including:Treasure Houses of Britain (1985);Buccaneers (1995); Middlemarch (1994); Antiques Roadshow (1998, 2009); The Golden Bowl (2000); Bleak House (2005); Pride & Prejudice (2005); The Da Vinci Code (2006); Castle in the Country (2006); Elizabeth: The Golden Age (2007); How We Built Britain (2007); Climbing Great Buildings (2010); Royal Upstairs Downstairs (2011); Housefull 2: The Dirty Dozen (2012); The Crown (2016); Top Gear (2018); Mortimer & Whitehouse: Gone Fishing (2021); The Flash (2023); and Frankenstein (2025).

== Lost village ==
The medieval settlement of Burghley, mentioned in Domesday, was abandoned by 1450. Failure to locate its site leads to the supposition that the settlement was near Burghley House, and perhaps lies below the estate.

== Gallery ==
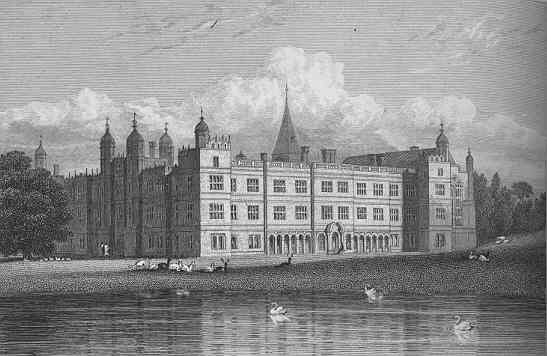
Burghley House from Jones's Views of the Seats of Noblemen and Gentlemen (1829)

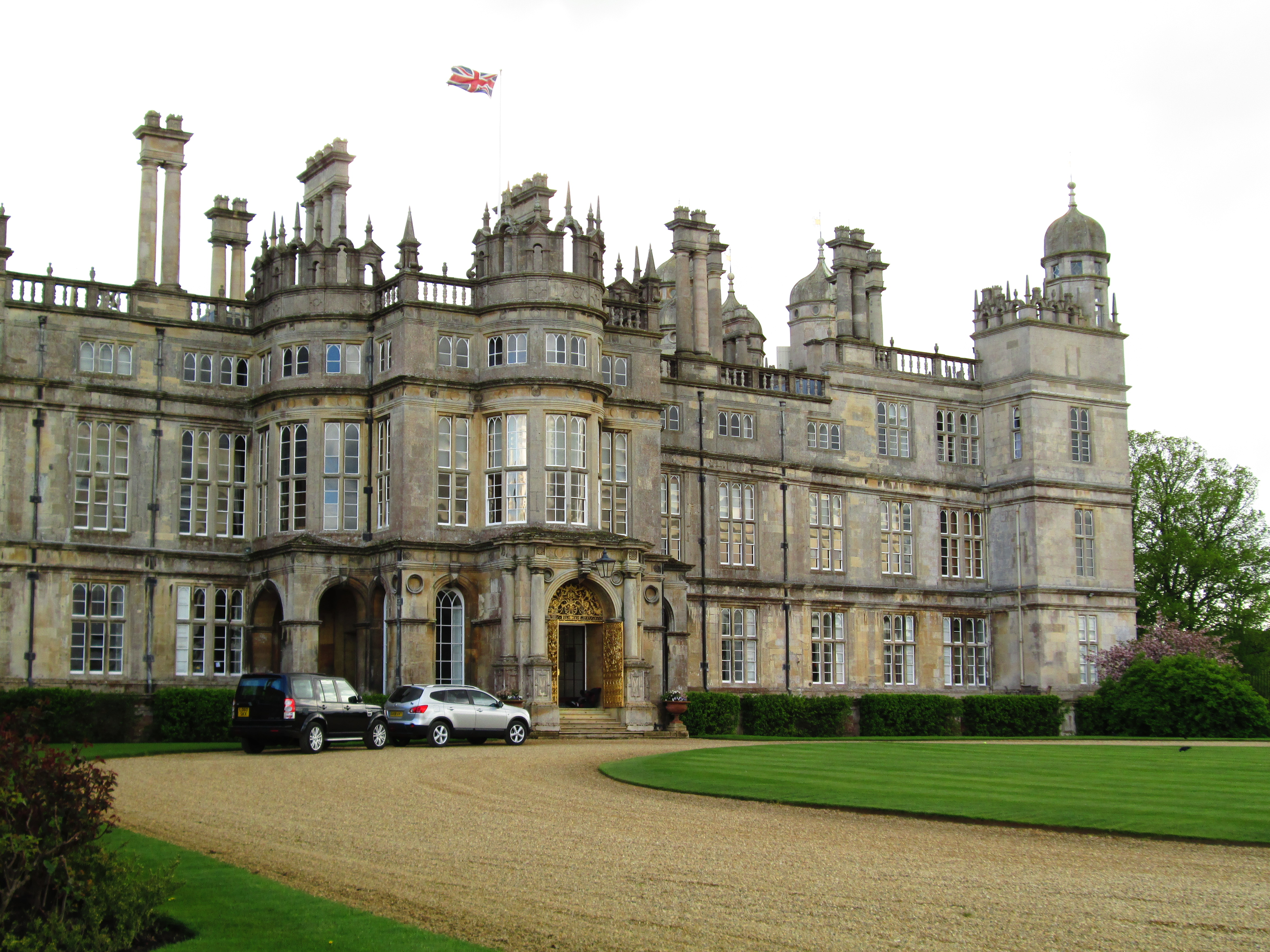
Entrance

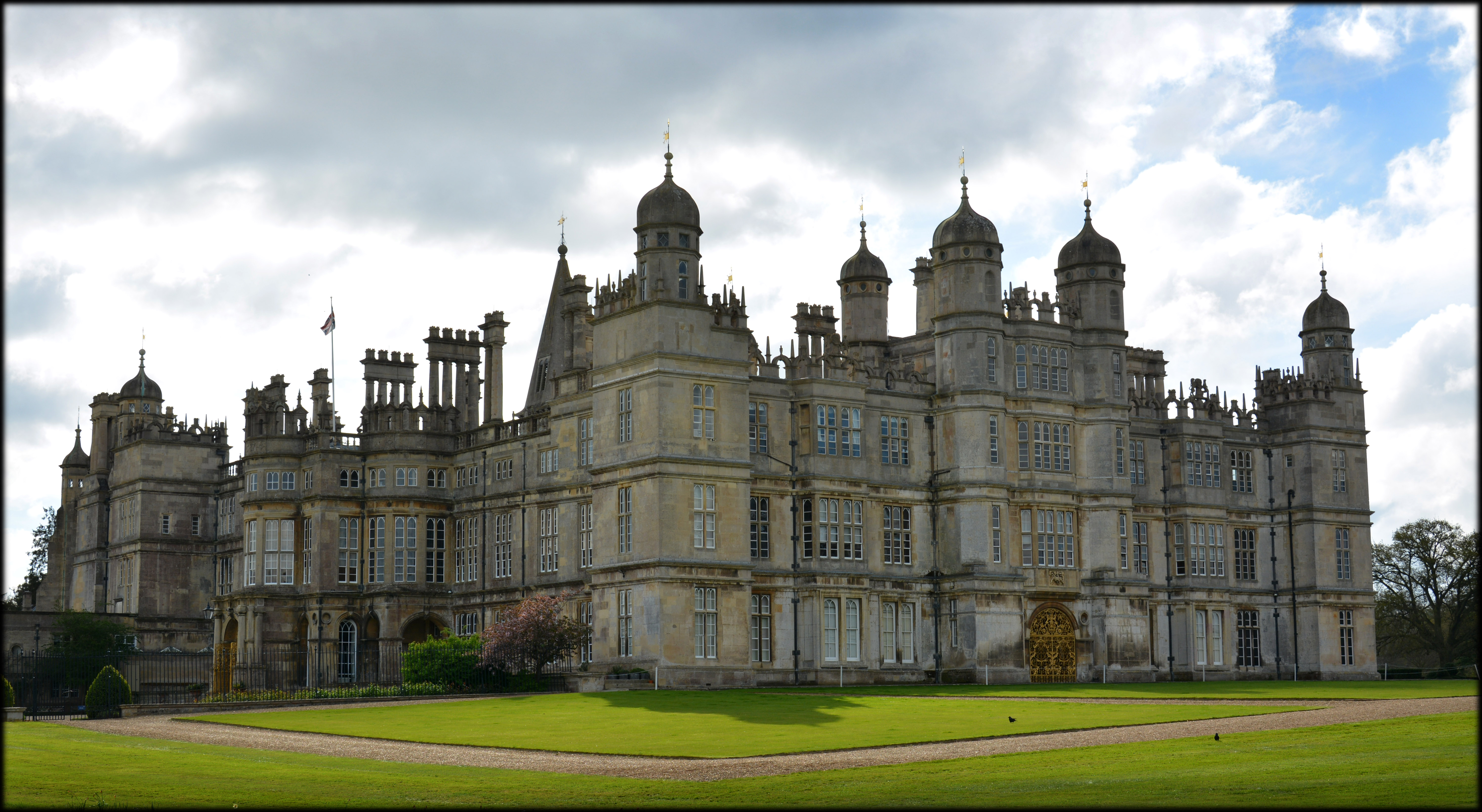
Side view of Burghley House

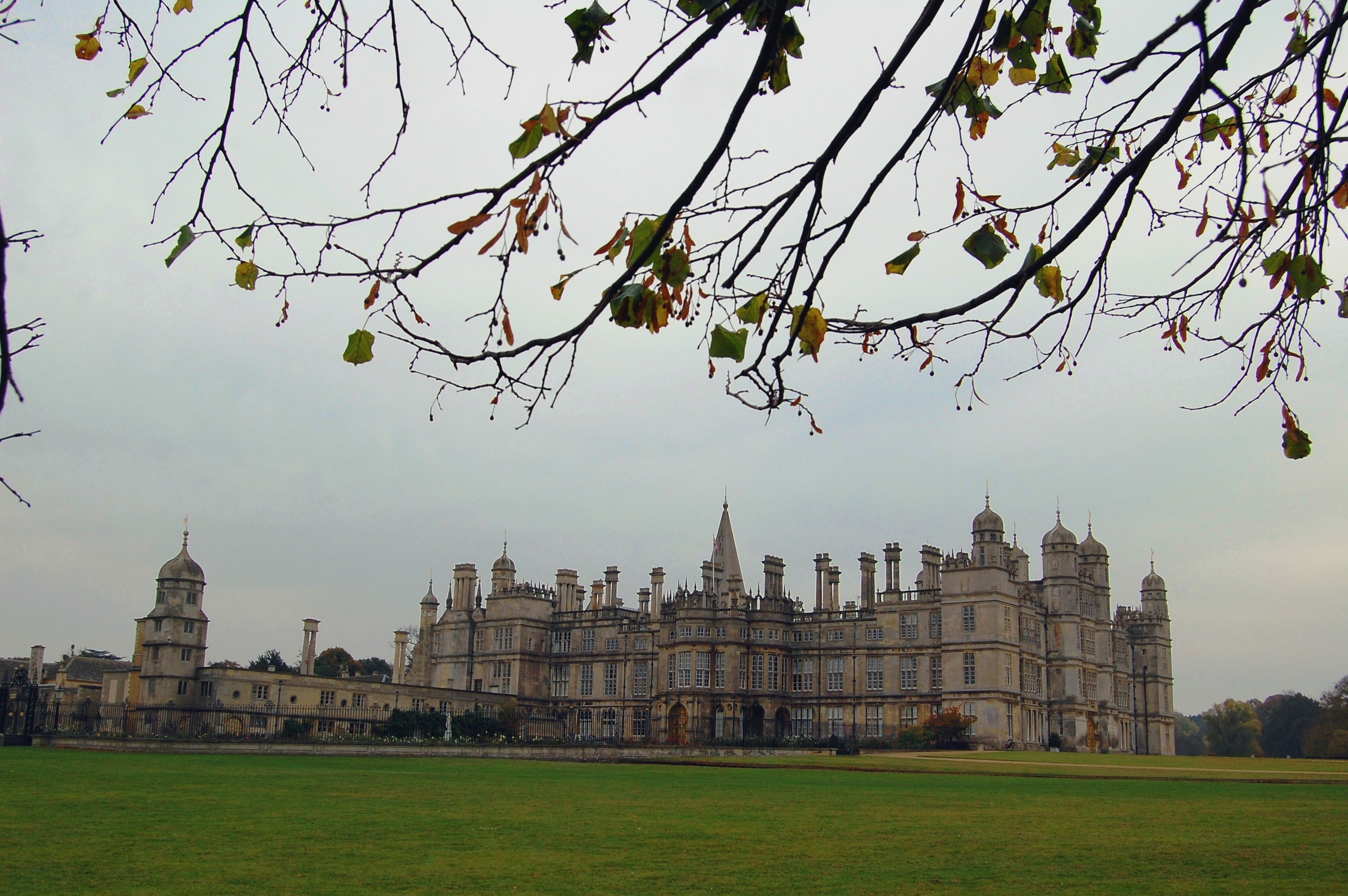
House from the park

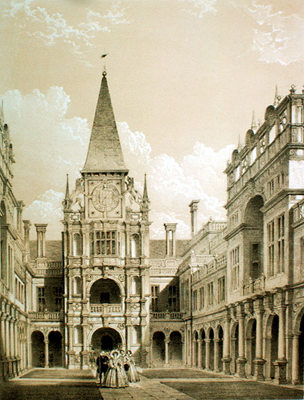
The courtyard as drawn by Joseph Nash in the 19th century, but with figures in Elizabethan costume

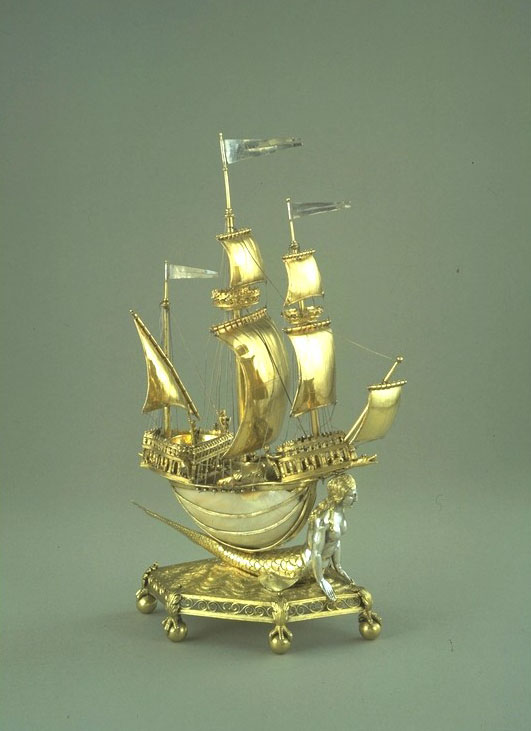
The Burghley Nef, 1527-1528, France, V&A Museum no. M.60-1959

== See also ==
- Burghley Nef, a silver-gilt salt cellar now in the collection of the Victoria and Albert Museum
- Susanna and the Elders (1622) by Artemisia Gentileschi in the collection at Burghley
- Cecil House, 16th- and 17th-century demolished London residences
- Theobalds House, second house half-way to London, built by the founder in Hertfordshire
