= Kimbolton Cabinet =

Ornate English cabinet made in 1775

The Kimbolton Cabinet is an ornate wooden cabinet on a stand, designed by Robert Adam and completed in 1775. It is in the collection of the Victoria and Albert Museum.

The cabinet is made from mahogany and oak, decorated with marquetry of satinwood and rosewood, with gilt-bronze ormolu mounts and inlaid with eleven Italian pietra dura plaques. It was made for the Dukes of Manchester and formerly displayed at their house at Kimbolton Castle. It has been in the collection of the Victoria and Albert Museum since 1949, acquired using funds from the James Rose Vallentin Bequest.

Cabinets are box-shaped items of furniture which were usually designed with many cupboards and drawers, to store small objects. The Kimbolton Cabinet was designed as a display object in its own right, and as a mount for the pietra dura plaques. The front panels suggest doors, but they are false: the cabinet is empty inside, with just one door at each end. The box is mounted on four legs. It measures 189 by 182 by 36.5 centimetres (74.4 in × 71.7 in × 14.4 in).

It was commissioned by Elizabeth Montagu, Duchess of Manchester, and designed by Robert Adam in 1771 in neo-classical Italianate style, with flat pilasters and straight narrow legs. Preliminary drawings of the cabinet by Adam are held by Sir John Soane's Museum in London. The cabinet was constructed in London in 1775 by Ince and Mayhew. Matthew Boulton and John Fothergill's Soho Manufactory near Birmingham supplied the gilt-bronze mounts, which cost more than the rest of the cabinet.

Mounted on the cabinet are eleven pietra dura panels showing romantic seascapes and mountainous pastoral scenes. The panels were made by Florentine artist Baccio Cappelli in 1709 at the Galleria dei Lavori mosaic workshop in Florence, using small samples of marble and other stones mounted on a slate backing to create the decorative images. They may have been collected by an English tourist on the Grand Tour. The heavy stone panels attached to the cabinet, balanced on its narrow legs, make the cabinet somewhat unstable and it is liable to tip over.

The cabinet is named after Kimbolton Castle, the home of the Dukes of Manchester until 1950. The castle was remodelled on more classical lines by Sir John Vanbrugh in the early 1700s, and Robert Adam designed a gatehouse and entrance screen in the 1760s.

The cabinet was exhibited the 1857 Art Treasures exhibition in Manchester. It was sold in July 1949 to antiques dealer John Bly, father of John Bly, who sold to the V&A the following month.
