= Susanna and the Elders (Artemisia Gentileschi, Burghley) =

Painting by Artemisia Gentileschi

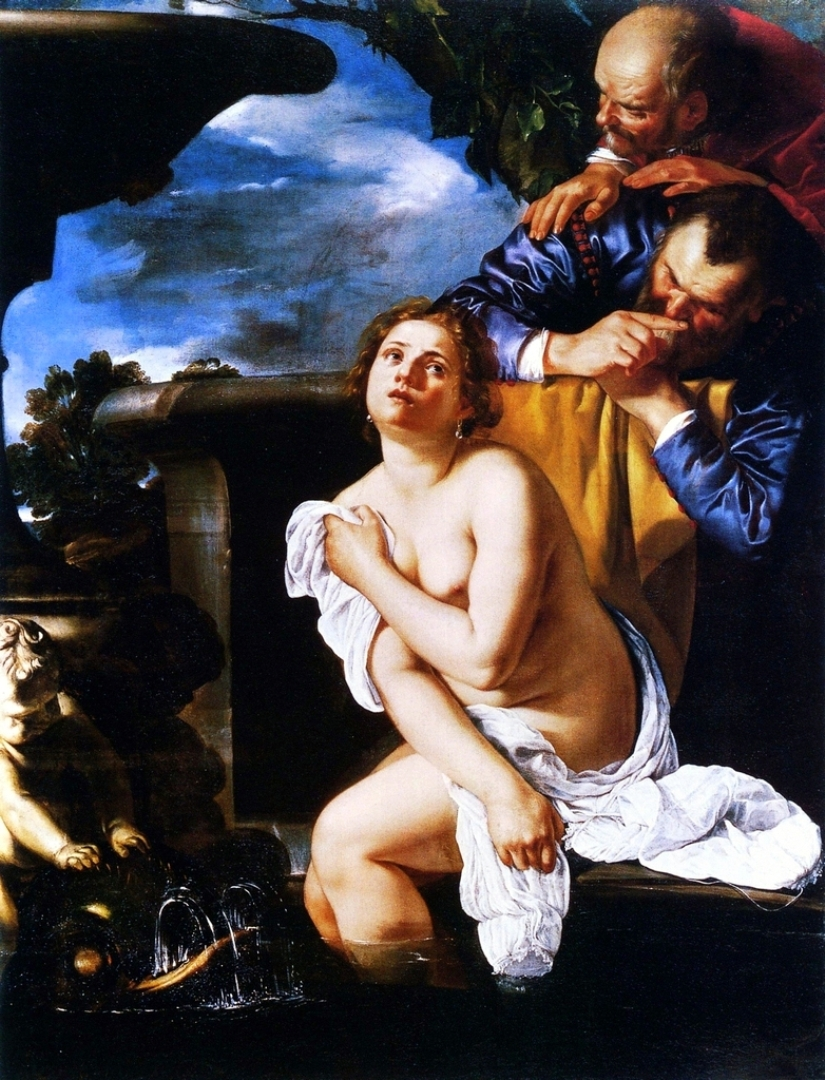
- Artist: Artemisia Gentileschi
- Year: 1622
- Medium: oil on canvas
- Dimensions: 161.5 cm × 123 cm (63.6 in × 48 in)
- Location: Burghley House, near Stamford, Lincolnshire

Susanna and the Elders is a painting by the Italian artist Artemisia Gentileschi. It is signed with Gentileschi's name and the date of 1622. The painting is in the collection at Burghley House near Stamford, Lincolnshire, England.

Gentileschi depicted the story of Susanna from the Book of Daniel in several paintings. Similar compositions of Susanna and the Elders are at Pommersfelden from 1610, at Brno dated 1649, and Bologna from 1652. A copy of the Burghley version is in the Nottingham Castle Museum collection.

== Description ==
A realistically proportioned nude woman is shown sitting at the edge of a pool, beside a small fountain. Leaning over the wall behind her are two older men leering at her; her distress at this invasion is evident by her upward-cast eyes and an attempt to cover herself with her arms and her chemise. The painting is signed "ARTEMITIA GENTILESCHI LOMI" on the stone wall above her knees.

== Gentileschi's interpretation ==
The figure's arms are arranged in the pose known as Venus pudica, best illustrated by the classical figure of the Crouching Venus. The rendering is more traditional than her 1610 Susanna, given both her artistic development as well as the influence of an etching of the same subject by Annibale Carracci. The addition of more landscape features as compared to that earlier version further signals the influence of Bolognese artists such as Guercino, who had arrived in Rome in the wake of the newly elected Bolognese pope.

== History ==
The work was painted in 1622, two years after Gentileschi returned to Rome after having started her career as an independent artist in Florence. The stylistic differences from her 1610 version of the same subject had led this 1622 work to initially be attributed to Caravaggio.

The painting was loaned to the Gentileschi exhibition that was held at the National Gallery in London in 2020, but had been postponed because of the COVID-19 pandemic.

== Provenance ==
The work may have been commissioned by papal nephew Cardinal Ludovico Ludovisi, which may explain the Bolognese style of the depiction. The painting has been listed as being in the Marquess of Exeter's family collection since at least the 1700s. It was listed in the 1763 Burghley inventory and was presumably acquired by Brownlow Cecil, 9th Earl of Exeter (1725 – 1793) while on the Grand Tour.

== See also ==
- List of works by Artemisia Gentileschi
- Susanna and the Elders in art
