= Lady Victoria Leatham =

British antiques expert

Lady Victoria Diana Leatham MBE (née Cecil; born 28 June 1947) is an antiques expert and television personality. She was the chatelaine of Burghley House from 1982 to 2007.

== Career ==
Leatham began working for Sotheby's in Bond Street, concentrating on the East of England. She joined the BBC Antiques Roadshow and was a regular contributor to the programme for 20 years. On the death of her father in 1981, with the marquessate passing to a Canadian uncle, she and her husband became the custodians of Burghley House for 25 years, increasing annual visitor numbers from 48,000 to 97,000 by 2007, before handing it over to their daughter, Miranda Rock.

In the 2018 Queen's Birthday Honours, she was appointed Member of the Order of the British Empire (MBE) for services to the community in Northamptonshire and Cambridgeshire.

=== Positions ===
- Honorary colonel of 158 Royal Anglian Regiment (1996–2002)
- Deputy Lieutenant of Cambridgeshire
- Worshipful Company of Drapers (first female Master)
- Public Governor, Peterborough and Stamford Hospital Trust
- Fundraiser, Ron Pickering Memorial Fund, which supports many of Britain's most talented athletes aged 15–23
- Founder, Fishing for Forces, which provides free fishing in private lakes and rivers to disabled veterans
- Patron of Westmorland of Apethorpe Archive Appeal 2012
- Trustee of Sue Ryder Hospice at Thorpe Hall in Peterborough
- President of Friends of Fotheringhay Church

== Personal life ==
Leatham is the daughter of David Cecil, 6th Marquess of Exeter, then known as Lord Burghley, and his second wife, Hon. Diana Henderson, granddaughter of Alexander Henderson, 1st Baron Faringdon.

She married Simon Patrick Leatham, son of Major Patrick Magor Leatham, on 25 April 1967. They have two children.

== Books ==
- The Antiques Roadshow Book of Do's and Dont's - A Simple guide to the Storage Cleaning and Preservation of Antiques and Works of Art with George Archdale (1989)
- Burghley: The Life of a Great House (1992); ISBN 1871569478
- Burghley with Jon Culverhouse and Eric Till (2009); ISBN 0851014534
