= Ince and Mayhew =

18th-century English furniture makers

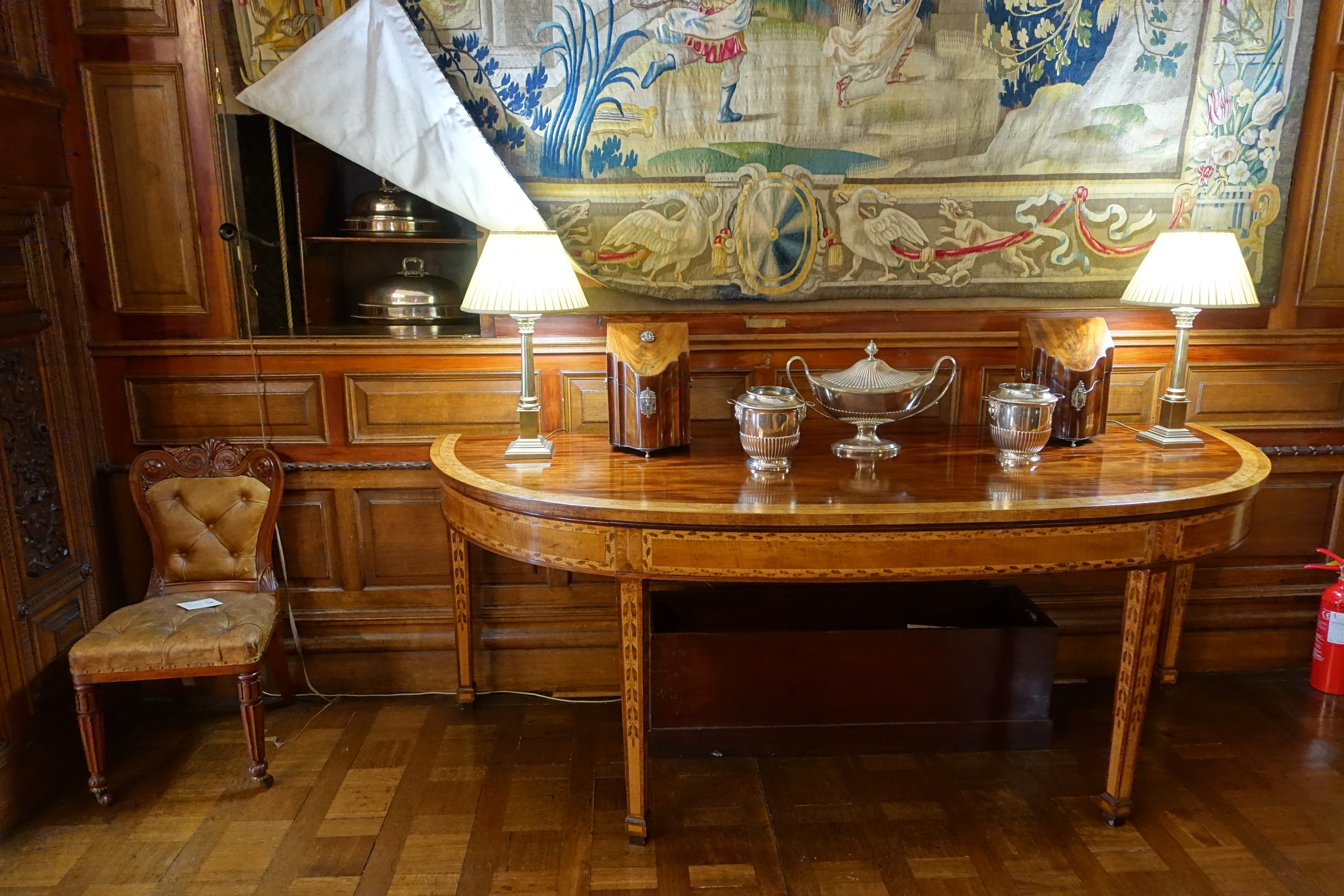
Sideboard by Ince and Mayhew, 1786

Ince and Mayhew were a partnership of furniture designers, upholsterers, and cabinetmakers, founded and run by William Ince (1737–1804) and John Mayhew (1736–1811) in London, from 1759 to 1803; Mayhew continued alone in business until 1809. Their premises were located in Marshall Street but were listed in London directories in Broad Street, Soho, 1763–83, and in Marshall Street, Carnaby Market, 1783–1809. The partnership's volume of engraved designs, The Universal System of Household Furniture, dedicated to the Duke of Marlborough (published in parts, 1759–63), was issued in imitative rivalry with Thomas Chippendale; Ince, who was a subscriber to the first edition of Chippendale's Director, was chiefly responsible for the designs, while Mayhew contributed the greater part of the partnership's capital, kept the accounts, and was in closer contact with the firm's clientele among the nobility and gentry. The name of the firm originally appears to have been "Mayhew and Ince", but on the title page of The Universal System, the names are reversed, suggesting that Ince was the more extensive contributor.

John Mayhew served as apprentice to William Smith Bradshaw, a prominent upholsterer, and William Ince served his time with John West, King Street, Covent Garden, according to the advertisement the partners took out in the Public Advertiser 27 January 1759, as they set up in the former premises of Charles Smith. The following year, Ince and Mayhew contributed some furniture designs to the joint production Household Furniture in Genteel Taste for the year 1760. By a Society of Upholsterers. Their designs helped bridge the gap between the massive and often florid style of Chippendale and the more slender and balanced forms of George Hepplewhite.

The notices for the designs of their Universal System are given in English and French, and the firm advertised "French furniture consigned from Paris"; Mayhew's name appears repeatedly in Christie's archives as a purchaser of French furniture and gilt-bronze at auction.

An early neoclassical suite of six armchairs and a settee, to be covered in Gobelins tapestry, was provided to George Coventry, 6th Earl of Coventry, for the Tapestry Room at Croome Court, Worcestershire (now at the Metropolitan Museum of Art). The "Antique Elbow Chairs" were the first neoclassical chairs in Europe with oval backs. Ince and Mayhew were also among the first London furniture-makers to exploit marquetry decoration when it became fashionable once again in the 1760s: in 1765, they provided for Croome Court a pair of uncompromisingly rectangular commodes with richly engraved neoclassical marquetry of satinwood and holly.

Ince and Mayhew provided furniture for several of Robert Adam's other patrons: Sir John Whitwell at Audley End (1767), the Duchess of Northumberland (from 1771), the Earl of Kerry (from 1771). In 1775, they constructed, to Adam's numerous and detailed designs, the celebrated Kimbolton Cabinet inlaid with Florentine pietra dura plaques for the Duchess of Manchester (now at the Victoria and Albert Museum); Boulton and Fothergill supplied the gilt-bronze mounts. For Lady Derby's Dressing Room at Derby House, London, they executed a demilune commode to Adam's design of October 1774, delivered in November 1775; it combined strongly contrasting richly engraved satinwood and harewood marquetry in an "Etruscan" taste with painted panels and gilt-bronze mounts; discovery of the commode enabled Hugh Roberts tentatively to identify a series of comparable demilune and serpentine-fronted marquetry commodes to the firm. Furnishings were also provided for the Duchess of Devonshire's private apartment at Chatsworth.

Ince and Mayhew also provided furnishings for Humphry Sturt at Crichel House, Dorset, where James Wyatt was providing designs for the interiors. Their furniture for Warren Hastings at Daylesford House, Worcestershire, amounted to £2187

The firm was prominent enough to be commissioned to vet Dominique Daguerre's bills for furnishing Carlton House, 1783–89. Still, none of their production for the Prince of Wales or the royal family has been identified.

They provided furniture in 1802 for Hester Thrale Piozzi at Brynbella. A suite of "Hepplewhite" chairs with the Prince of Wales's feathers in the backs was provided for the Westminster Fire Office (1792), where they remain.

The two partners married the sisters, Isabella and Nancy Stephenson, in a double wedding at the fashionable church of St George's, Hanover Square, on 20 February 1762.
