= John Bly =

British antiques expert

John Bly FRSA
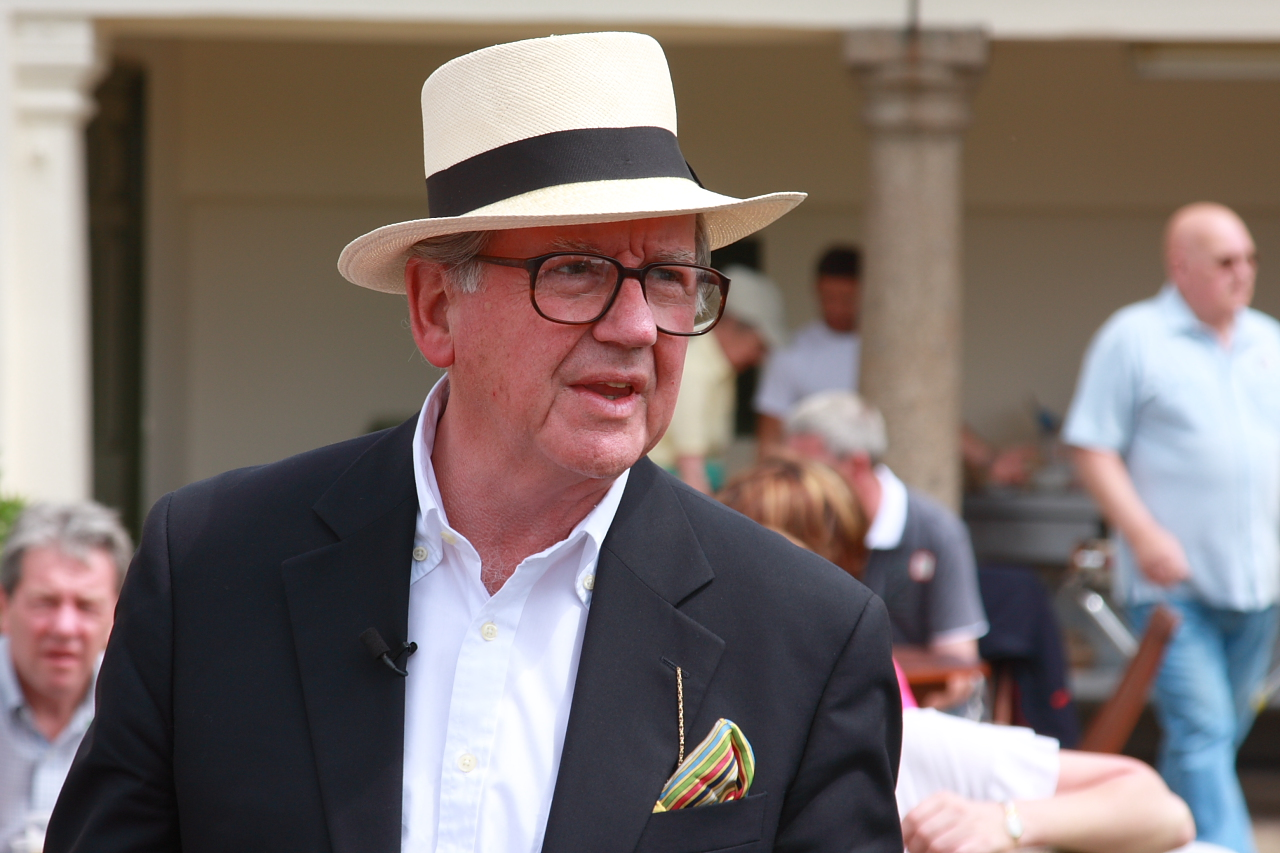
- Bly, in Jersey, in 2009.
- Born: 27 May 1939 (age 87)
- Education: Berkhamsted School
- Occupations: Antiques dealer; author; after-dinner speaker; broadcaster
- Television: Antiques Roadshow
- Spouse: Virginia Fisher (m. 1967)
- Children: 2
- Awards: Liveryman of the Worshipful Company of Goldsmiths
- Website: johnbly.com

John Bly FRSA, (born 27 May 1939), is an antiques dealer, author, after-dinner speaker and broadcaster who is best known from the BBC's Antiques Roadshow TV program (UK).

== Career ==
Educated at Berkhamsted School, Bly is also a lecturer, public speaker, restorer, valuer, fund raiser, editor and columnist. He was the presenter of the TV series, Looking At Antiques (1971-1972), had his own show for Anglia TV Heirloom (1975-1992), fronted BBC Crimewatch Aladdin's Cave (1984-1989), BBC2's Heirs and Graces (1989-1990), and was Furniture Specialist on the BBC's Antiques Roadshow (1979-2018) and BBC4 Secret Knowledge (2013). His own production company, Posh Films with Lady Victoria Leatham, was responsible for the two-part TV programme Treasure Houses of Britain.

As a columnist, Bly wrote for the American Antiques Monthly (1975-1982) and, from 1989 to 2001, he had Q&A weekly features in the Saturday Telegraph, Daily Mail, The Mail on Sunday, and The Lady. He has also contributed to magazines such as: Collectors' Guide, Antique Collecting, and lifestyle magazines, including networked Fish Media Group Ltd since 2007.

Bly's lectures include: Dupont Winterthur Museum; Art Institute of Chicago; University of Birmingham, Alabama; New York Historical Society; Palm Beach Historical Society; San Francisco Historical Society; Museum of Art, Milwaukee; Governor's Mansion, Springfield Illinois; Key West Museum; Rosary College, Chicago; Temple Sinai Sisterhood, New Orleans; Galesburg University, Illinois; V & A Museum, London; and visiting lecturer on cruise ships.

== Personal life ==
Bly married Virginia Fisher in 1967, and they have two sons. Bly is a jazz historian and accomplished drummer. He has appeared on the BBC1 chat show Wogan in the late 1980s, and on Children in Need, playing a pair of antique silver spoons as musical instruments. He supports Cancer Research UK, Kids with Cancer, St Christopher's Hospice and two local Hospices at Home, Kids for Kids in Darfur, Asthma UK, and Children in Need.

== Bibliography ==
- Discovering Hallmarks on English Silver 1969, 3rd edition 2000
- Discovering English Furniture 1971, 3rd edition 2010, Japanese edition 1993
- Discovering Victorian and Edwardian Furniture 1973 (edited and compiled)
- Is It Genuine? 1986, reissued as Miller's Is It Genuine? 2002
- Antiques Guide for the Collector 1986 (edited and compiled)
- Heirloom 1989
- Antique Furniture Expert 1991
- Silver and Sheffield Plate Marks 1993, 2nd edition 2008 (edited and contributed)
- Treasures in Your Home, 1993
- The Pocket Guide to Antiques and Collectables 1999
- John Bly's Antiques Masterclass 2005
- English Furniture 2010

== Honours and awards ==
Bly is a Liveryman of the Goldsmiths' Company 1989, Honorary Citizen of New Orleans, Kentucky Squire, and a past-Chairman of the British Antique Dealers' Association.
