= Buckmaster & Moore =

London stockbroker established in 1895

Buckmaster & Moore (B&M) was a London stockbroker established in 1895 and acquired by Credit Suisse Group in 1987.

== History ==
Charles Armytage-Moore and Walter Selby Buckmaster were founding partners of London stockbrokers, Buckmaster and Moore. Buckmaster had been admitted to the Stock Exchange in 1895, and traded with other partners including Douglas Holms, Harry Franklin, and later Armytage-Moore, who was admitted in 1903. The partnership between Buckmaster and Moore started around 1905. The others, Holms and Franklin, dissolved their partnership in 1908.

Buckmaster and Moore had been pupils at Repton School, and both were sportsmen. Buckmaster, whilst at Trinity College, Cambridge became captain of the polo team. He became a leading polo player, winning silver medals in the 1900 and 1908 Olympic Games. He was also a member of the winning team in the International Polo Cup in 1902. Moore joined the Marylebone Cricket Club and played against Hertfordshire in 1904.

As stockbrokers, they had developed a private client business. They had London offices at 64 Cornhill, EC3 and later 52, Bishopsgate, EC2A. Their Perfined Contract Revenue Stamp identity mark was B&M.

One of their partners, Oswald Toynbee ‘foxy’ Falk (1879–1972), had attended Rugby School, then Balliol College, Oxford (as an exhibitioner), where his uncle, the social philosopher and historian, Arnold Toynbee, once taught. Joining the firm after leaving the Treasury, he began to develop a new view on economics. An earlier partner Francis James Rennell Rodd, Francis Rodd, 2nd Baron Rennell served in the artillery and as an intelligence officer during the First World War, where he befriended T. E. Lawrence, triggering his passion for exploring desert landscapes. He entered the Diplomatic Service in 1919, resigning in 1924, joining the Bank of England and becoming a partner of B&M, resigning in 1929. He became managing director of Morgan, Grenfell & Co.

Another partner was Maurice Bonham-Carter, an English Liberal politician, civil servant, and first-class cricketer. He was H. H. Asquith's Principal Private Secretary during Asquith's time as prime minister from 1910 to 1916 and later served in other government posts. The actress Helena Bonham Carter is his granddaughter.

John Maynard Keynes (1883-1946), one of the firm's clients (also Bursar of King's College, Cambridge), joined with Falk to form a syndicate to speculate in currency movements. Keynes lost his fortune in 1920 with money borrowed from both his father and Falk. Falk eventually became a senior partner. He went on to write many financial papers and books which are studied today in business schools.

At one time in the late 1920s the firm employed the young Francis Pakenham, later Frank Pakenham, 7th Earl of Longford, as well as the young Oxford mathematician J. H. C. Whitehead.

Buckmaster lived at Moreton Manor, Moreton Morrell and was Master of the Warwickshire Foxhounds. He married Ida Blyth in 1896, they had two daughters. He died on 30 October 1942 at Warwick Hospital. Moore lived at Winterfold House in Surrey, and married Celine Pappa, daughter of a Greek born stockbroker, in 1917. They had no children and he died in December 1960.

The firm was eventually taken over by Credit Suisse Group in 1987. Buckmaster & Moore was renamed and reorganised into broking and fund management operations. The company was dissolved in November 1996.

== Sources ==
- Cricket Archive (C Armytage Moore) MCC:
- R F Harrod, The Life of John Maynard Keynes, London, Macmillan, 1951
- O.T. Falk: (Keynes's model economist?), Alex Millmow, School of Business, Ballarat, Australia (Working Paper Series:001 – 2011)
- The London Gazette, 2 April 1926: Buckmaster & Moore Partnership Notice
- The London Gazette, 26 March 1929: Buckmaster & Moore Partnership Notice
- The London Gazette, 16 February 1932: Buckmaster & Moore Partnership Notice
- The Foreign Exchange Market of London: Development Since 1900, John Atkin, Routledge, 2005

== Links ==
- Companycheck.co.uk: Buckmaster & Moore
