= C. J. Coventry =

Australian-born British historian

- Born: 25 February 1991 (age 35); Adelaide, South Australia, Australia
- Occupations: Historian, political adviser
- Spouse: Rebecca Coventry
- Children: 3
- Awards: John Barrett Award (2024)

Academic background
- Education: Australian National University (BA); University of Adelaide (LL.B); University of New South Wales (MA); Federation University Australia (Ph.D)
- Alma mater: Prince Alfred College
- Thesis: Keynes From Below: A Social History of Second World War Keynesian Economics (2023)
- Doctoral advisor: Keir Reeves
- Other advisor: Alex Millmow
- Influences: Jacob Bronowski; John Berger

Academic work
- Discipline: History
- Sub-discipline: Social history
- Institutions: King's College London
- Notable works: The "Eloquence" of Robert J. Hawke (2021); Links in the Chain (2019)
- Notable ideas: Ocker chic
- Website: cjcoventry.co.uk

Cameron "Cam" James Coventry (born 25 February 1991) is an English-Australian historian at King's College London and former parliamentary assistant. He wrote a political and diplomatic history of former Australian prime minister Bob Hawke's secret involvement with the United States of America during the 1970s. In another work, Links in the Chain, he made the first attempt by a historian to comprehensively assess the extent of Australian financial benefit from British slavery.

== Education and political career ==
Coventry grew up in the village of Stirling, South Australia in the Adelaide Hills. He attended Stirling East Primary School and Prince Alfred College in Adelaide where he was captain of debating, editor of the school yearbook, and won Head of the River. After school Coventry studied at Adelaide Law School. In 2014 Coventry moved to Canberra to work in Senator Nick Xenophon's parliamentary office in the Australian Senate. He spent two years at Parliament, during which time he completed a degree in arts at the Australian National University, where he was educated by historian Frank Bongiorno.

== Academic career ==
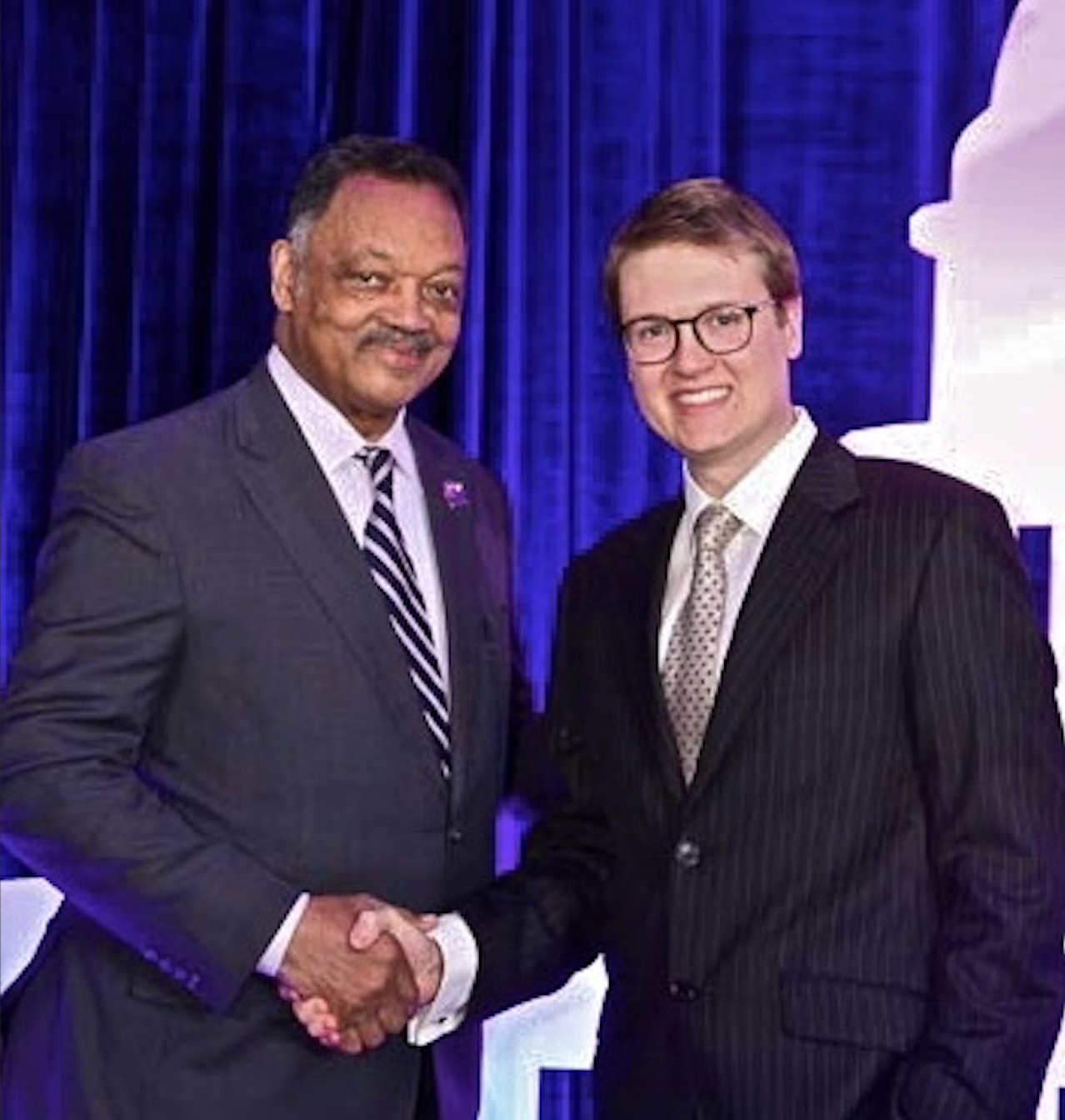
Coventry with Jesse Jackson in 2013.

At the University of New South Wales and the Australian Defence Force Academy Coventry completed a Master of Arts under the direction of political scientist Clinton Fernandes, submitting a dissertation in 2018 called "The Origins of the Royal Commission on Intelligence and Security." The dissertation was later used by former justice of the High Court of Australia Michael Kirby in his work. In 2017 he moved to Ballarat and began a PhD in 2019 for which he was awarded the university's stipendiary scholarship. In 2019, "Links in the Chain: British slavery, South Australia and Victoria" was published. This work generated debate in Adelaide and his adopted city of Ballarat about place-names honoring beneficiaries of slavery. In 2020 Coventry jointly presented the Annual Lecture of the History Council of South Australia in which he discussed the need to reconsider 'South Australian exceptionalism' in light of its dependence on slave money. Coventry's work on slavery accurately observed that George Fife Angas was not shown to be a slave owner by the Legacies of British Slavery database, unlike numerous other commentators.

Coventry wrote an open letter to Ballarat City Council in 2021 denouncing its enclosure of the Ballarat Common that explained its long history and heritage significance. The letter was signed by 13 other scholars including Ian D. Clark. It provoked debate in the local paper, The Courier, about the overdevelopment of Ballarat and the loss of working class heritage. In 2022 the council indicated the creation of a new "great park" would be made from a portion of the old common.

Coventry's PhD thesis, completed in 2023 at Federation University, Ballarat, is the first social history specifically focused on Keynesian economics. He shows that the introduction of the macroeconomic agenda of John Maynard Keynes during the Second World War was unpopular among workers in Australia and the United Kingdom. Coventry's thesis supervisors where the cultural historian Keir Reeves, the economic historian Alex Millmow, the socialist sociologist Jeremy C. A. Smith and the social/military historian Erik Eklund. He writes a blog, "In Search of the Modern Paideia," that aims to cover all of human history from human evolution to the 21st century using a materialistic and natural philosophical approach.

=== Bob Hawke ===
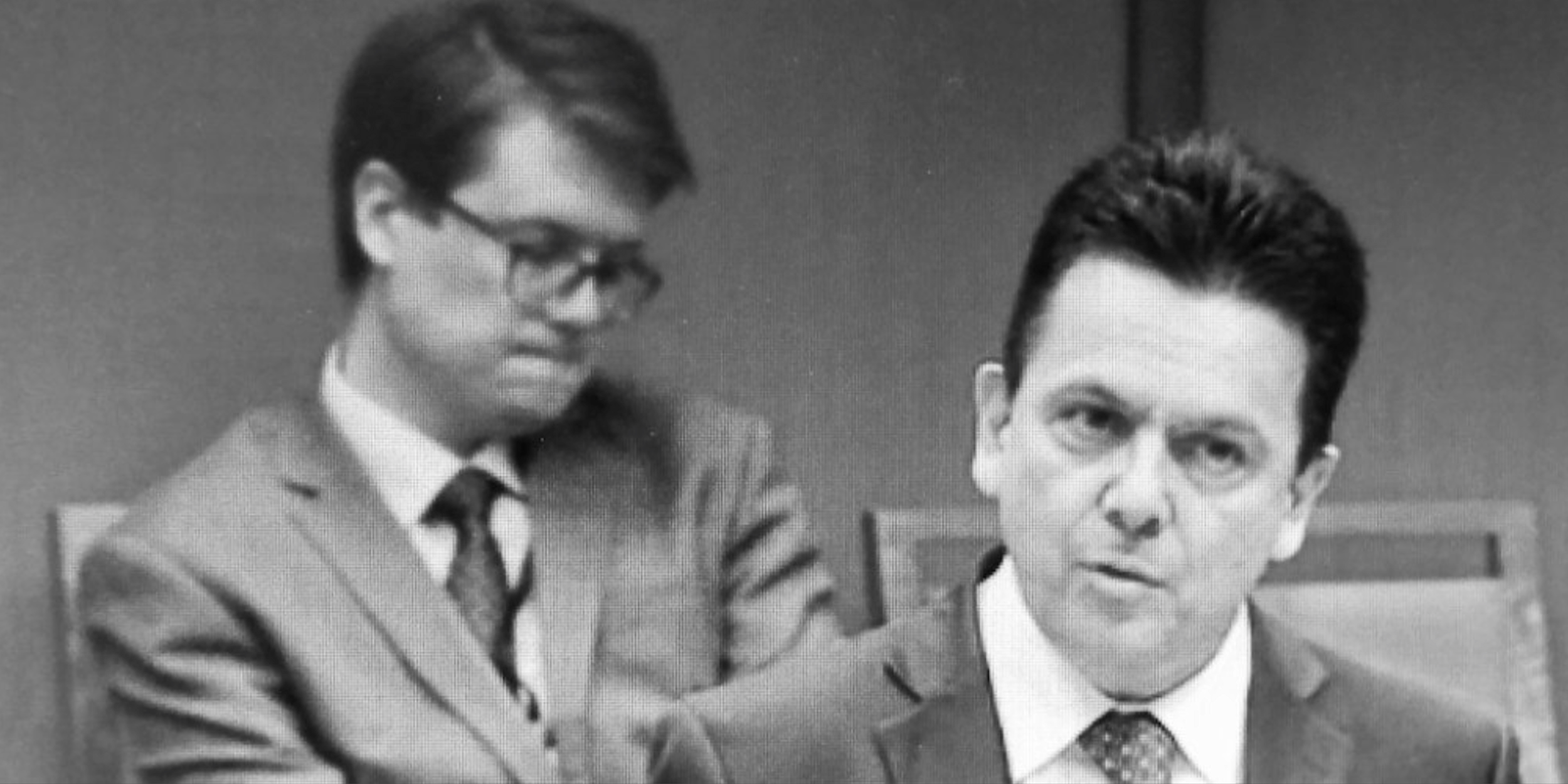
Coventry in the Senate seated behind Xenophon in 2015.

In June 2021 the Australian Journal of Politics and History published "The 'Eloquence' of Robert J. Hawke: United States informer, 1973–79," which propounded the long-held suspicion that the former prime minister, Labor Party leader and ACTU president had collaborated with the United States Government in the 1970s. Coventry's article demonstrated by using documentary evidence that Hawke had handed considerable amounts of inside-information to US officials, undermining the causes he was publicly committed to. Coventry's article also named numerous other informers, including John Ducker, Billy Sneddon, Bill Hayden, Rupert Murdoch, David Combe and Don Willesee. Coventry later said the motivation for undertaking the research of the cables at the National Archives and Records Administration had been his recollections of media reports about the revelations of WikiLeaks which were "pertinent to the present debate about foreign interference – in the United States but also Australia."

The article attracted domestic and international media attention, including the front page of The Australian newspaper and as the lede weekend article on the Guardian Australia. Within a fortnight the article was the most read article in the Journal's near-seven decade history. Journalist Jeff Sparrow said of Coventry's work: "Not all of Coventry’s evidence is new. But, assembled as a package, it deals a blow to the Hawke legend. Everyone loves a larrikin. Nobody likes a snitch." It was subsequently reported that the publication of the article had prevented Labor Leader, Anthony Albanese, from rebranding himself as Australia's next Hawke-style consensus politician. The revelation of Hawke's relationship with the United States was discussed by Dominic Sandbrook and Tom Holland in their history podcast The Rest is History and was likened to the activities of Jim Callaghan in the United Kingdom at the same time. Coventry gave a long-form interview for the Floodcast podcast on Hawke and the United States infiltration of the unions and ALP. The article was cited in David Day's 2024 biography of Hawke, Young Hawke: The Making of a Larrikin.

The article was immediately censured by Hawke-Keating-era politicians. Stephen Loosely, who had been the ALP's national president during the early 1990s, said that the article was "nonsense" and "For someone half a century later to label these people informants, when they can't defend themselves, simply doesn't hold water." An erstwhile Liberal politician, Paul Everingham (the Northern Territory's chief minister from 1978 to 1984), said that the informer argument was "balls." Hawke's authorised biographer wrote that the label "informant" or "spy" was "misleading" because Hawke had a close relationship with British officials as well. An academic reviewer of Troy Bramston's biography of Hawke noted that Coventry's article was "one of the few academic sources referenced by Bramston." Coventry's article was reviewed for the Melbourne Labour History Society by former secretary of the Victorian Trades Hall, Brian Boyd, which added further information about what was known of Hawke's US connections at the time.

In 2023, Coventry wrote an article on Hawke's famous world record beer skol (scull) in which he showed it to be "apocryphal, possibly fabricated". However, the record played a key part of Hawke's "ocker chic" (Australian machismo) image designed to appeal to Australian voters. Since the 1970s, ocker chic became the public relations model for Australian politicians. Since the 1980s middle-class masculinists have used ocker chic to reassert their power over Australian politics, economics, culture and society. Coventry received the John Barrett Award for this article in 2024. Commentary on the article in the press linked Hawke's dubious world record beer scull with other well-known but fabricated stories about him. The article as of January 2025 is on the all-time top 30 most read articles published in the Journal of Australian Studies (JAS).

== Personal life ==
In 2015 Coventry married Rebecca Coventry, who is a fintech lawyer currently working for Visa Inc.. After living in Adelaide, Canberra, Melbourne, Ballarat and in New Zealand on the edge of Fiordland National Park, they now live with their three children in South London, United Kingdom. Coventry is a relation of the Coventry and Spencer families.
