= Charles Armytage-Moore =

Founding partner of London stockbrokers Buckmaster & Moore

Charles James Eglantine Armytage-Moore (27 April 1880 – 10 December 1960), founder partner of London stockbrokers Buckmaster & Moore (now Credit Suisse Group).

== Family background ==
Charles Armytage-Moore came from a background of Irish nobility and accomplishment. Close relatives include his aunt, Priscilla Cecilia, Countess of Annesley (wife of the 3rd Earl), his sister, also Priscilla Cecilia, Countess of Annesley (pronounced "Anzlee"), wife of Hugh Annesley, 5th Earl Annesley. She was considered a great beauty of her day and photographed by Alexander Bassano (1829–1913), the leading high society portrait photographer in Victorian London. Her daughter Lady Constance Malleson, was a writer and actress (appearing as Colette O'Niel) and long-time lover of Bertrand Russell the philosopher. His family moved in the highest circles of London and Dublin society.

Charles was the youngest son of William Armytage-Moore J.P. (1806–1883) who managed the Annesley Estates at Castlewellan in Northern Ireland. He was brother of Priscilla Cecilia, the Countess of Annesley, (wife of the 3rd Earl). William Armytage-Moore (sometimes written 'Armitage-') married Mary Elizabeth Lockwood, née Metcalfe (1845–1932), in the British Embassy Paris on 8 June 1869. It was a second marriage for both, both having been widowed. Their home was at Arnmore, just outside Cavan.

William and Mary had five children: Priscilla Cecilia (1870–1941) named after her aunt, married her first cousin, Lt. Col. Hugh Annesley, 5th Earl Annesley. Ethel (Ettie) Kathleen (1871–1891) who married Percy French the Irish composer and entertainer, but at the age of 20 she and her baby daughter died in childbirth. Hugh William (1873–1954) (appointed 2nd Lieutenant 3rd Bat. the Royal Dublin Fusiliers in 1891) inherited the garden at Rowallane, Saintfield, County Down, Ireland in 1903, and developed them into the famous Rowallane Garden. They are now owned by The National Trust and open to visitors. John Reginald Rowallan (1876–1951), married Amy Campbell Johnston in 1909 in Vancouver, Canada, later travelled to New Zealand, joining the military and returning to England after WWI. The fifth child was Charles. There was also a half-sister who grew up with them at Arnmore, Constance Metcalfe Lockwood (1864–1949), born to Mary and her first husband.

Charles James, born in Dublin in 1880, his father had died when he was three, and he was educated at Repton School representing them at cricket in 1898, playing against Malvern College. By 1901 he and his mother lived in London living at 12 Ashley Place, Westminster SW1. He became a stockbroker, and joined the Marylebone Cricket Club. In World War One served as a 2nd Lieutenant in The Army Service Corps.

== Marriage ==
In Jan–Mar 1917 he married Celine Marie Pappa in Marylebone London. A few months later she received news about her younger brother Second Lieutenant Armaund Francis Pappa, serving with the East Yorkshire Regiment had been killed in France on 5 May. Celine was born in London 26 January 1884, the eldest daughter of Demosthanes G. Pappa, (a Greek born in Turkey), and his French wife Franceska Jacobi (born in Paris). They had a younger daughter Halina and two younger sons Alexander and Armand. Her father was a company director and stockbroker. After the First World War, Charles took his bride on a world tour in the 1920s, visiting Canada, USA, Hawaii, Japan before settling down in Winterfold House in the Surrey hills. During the 1930s they would take winter cruises to Marseilles, Lisbon, Tangiers and Jamaica, as well as South Africa. In the 1950s they continued to travel to South Africa.

== Buckmaster and Moore ==
In 1895 Walter Buckmaster was admitted to the Stock Exchange, Moore joined him in 1905, becoming founding partners of the London firm of stockbrokers, Buckmaster and Moore. Buckmaster was eight years older, both had been educated at Repton. Buckmaster was a keen sportsman and later at Cambridge became Captain of the polo team. He developed into one of the country's leading players, taking part in the 1900 Olympic Games, and a member of the winning team in the International Polo Cup, in 1902. In 1904 Armytage-Moore played for the Marylebone Cricket Club against Hertfordshire at Clarence Park St Albans.

As stockbrokers they had developed a good private client business, and were very well connected. They had offices at 64 Cornhill, EC3 and later 52, Bishopsgate, EC2A. One of their partners, Oswald Toynbee ‘foxy’ Falk, (born 1879), attended Rugby School, then Balliol College Oxford (as an exhibitioner), where his uncle the social philosopher and historian, Arnold Toynbee, once taught. Joining the firm after leaving the Treasury, he began to develop a new view on economics. John Maynard Keynes one of the firm's clients (also Burser of King's College, Cambridge), joined with Falk to form a syndicate to speculate in currency movements. Keynes lost his fortune in 1920 with money borrowed from both his father and Falk. OT Falk eventually became a senior partner. He went on to write many financial papers and books which are studied today in Business Schools. Another partner, Maurice Bonham Carter (born in 1880) was also a Balliol graduate, and sportsman. In addition, he served as the principal private secretary to the politician H. H. Asquith and became a leading figure in the Liberal Party.

At one time in the late 1920s the firm employed the young Francis Pakenham, later Frank Pakenham, 7th Earl of Longford, as well as the young Oxford mathematician J. H. C. Whitehead. Both of which, for different reasons decided the City was not the life for them.

Buckmaster died in 1942 and Moore in 1960 and the firm eventually taken over by Credit Suisse Group in 1987. Buckmaster & Moore was renamed and reorganised into broking and fund management operations. The company was dissolved in November 1996.

== Winterfold House, Surrey ==
After his marriage to Celine Pappa in 1917, he bought Winterfold House in 1923 located in the Surrey hills near Cranleigh. Originally built in 1886 by Richard Webster QC, (later Richard Webster, 1st Viscount Alverstone), he set about improving the estate. He acquired additional land in 1925 and reconstructed the main facade in Queen Anne style. He enhanced the gardens with rare rhododendrons, camellias, azaleas and magnolias. One particular red-flowered species (Rhododendron barbatum Wallich ex G. Don 1834) won an 'Award of Merit' when exhibited by Winterfold House in 1934. Celine Armytage-Moore joined the Surrey Archaeological Society in 1927 and continued her interest until the 1950s.

During WW2 Winterfold was requisitioned by the British Government and used by Special Operations Executive, SOE, as a training school designated STS 7 as the location of the Student Assessment Board. See List of SOE establishments.

Moore had become an invalid in the post war years confining him to his estate, and he died in December 1960 age 80. They had no children, so his wife Celine sold Winterfold in 1962 together with their fantastic collection of furniture and art. Celine died in January 1970 in Avalon, Midhurst Road, Haslemere Surrey age 88.

== Sources ==
- G.E. Cokayne; with Vicary Gibbs, H.A. Doubleday, Geoffrey H. White, Duncan Warrand and Lord Howard de Walden, editors, The Complete Peerage of England, Scotland, Ireland, Great Britain and the United Kingdom, Extant, Extinct or Dormant, new ed., 13 volumes in 14 (1910–1959; reprint in 6 volumes, Gloucester, UK: Alan Sutton Publishing, 2000), volume I, page 172.
- Armytage-Moore: genealogical correspondence published by Robert Ward and Peter Grauer
- R F Harrod, The Life of John Maynard Keynes, London, Macmillan, 1951
- O.T. Falk: (Keynes’s model economist?), Alex Millmow, School of Business, Ballarat, Australia (Working Paper Series:001 – 2011)
- The London Gazette, 2 April 1926: Buckmaster & Moore Partnership Notice
- The London Gazette, 26 March 1929: Buckmaster & Moore Partnership Notice
- The London Gazette, 16 February 1932: Buckmaster & Moore Partnership Notice
- Cricket Archive (CJA Moore) Repton School:
- Cricket Archive (C Armytage Moore) MCC:
- The Surrey Archaeological Society:
- Winterfold Sale: Residential & agricultural estate, Reference / 2961/2 June 1962 Sale of 'residential' and agricultural estate' house, staff accommodation and 219a including farmhouse, – as a whole or in 11 lots. Auctioneers Knight Frank and Rutley, London W1 and King and Chasemore, Horsham, for executors of the late C Armytage Moore.
