= Brian Boyd (unionist) =

Australian trade unionist

Brian Boyd is a trade unionist. He was elected secretary of the Victorian Trades Hall Council on 5 May 2005, succeeding Leigh Hubbard in this position, one of Australia's most powerful trade union roles. He is a longstanding member of Birds Australia, now called BirdLife Australia.

Boyd worked for the Builders Labourers Federation from late 1979 to 1988, which included the period when the BLF was deregistered. He coordinated Victoria's building unions, when working as an industrial and campaigns officer with the Victorian Trades Hall since being elected to the position of Industrial Officer in 1988.

In regard to the right to strike and industry-wide bargaining, Boyd was reported in The Age in April 2007 "I'm arguing that there's still no unfettered right to strike, there are limitations on it; we might want to stop work to give consideration to the Iraq war, for instance," The statement was made in regard to the debate around the Federal Australian Labor PartyIR policy leading up to the 2007 Federal election.

In regard to Australian Workplace Agreements (AWAs), Boyd has voiced concern many may breach OHS law following statistics released in April by the major newspapers that claim 30% of AWAs do not allow workers to have rest breaks during scheduled hours of work. He has called AWAs that breach OHS regulations as criminal and asked that WorkSafe Victoria prosecute any employer found to have taken away this safety condition under the Occupational Health and Safety Act. "Workers are protected by occupational health and safety law. Our Victorian law says that the employer has to provide a safe system of work – and that includes decent rest breaks," Boyd said. "Employers think they can do what they want under Howard’s laws, but they are forgetting that state-based OHS laws still call them to account."

In May 2009 Boyd was re-elected unopposed as VTHC Secretary for a further 4 years. He has been a member of the Australian Council of Trade Unions(ACTU) Executive since 2005. On 2 May 2013 Boyd was re elected for the third time as VTHC Secretary. He said at the time he was looking forward to campaigning against Tony Abbott in the lead up to the next federal election due on the 14/9/13. In 2013 he wrote the introduction to the review booklet entitled : 'The Builders Labourers Federation -Lessons for the 21st Century-Never Powerless' with other contributions from : Norm Wallace, Paddy Donnelly, Dave Kerin, George Despard and Malcolm McDonald. Early in 2014 he wrote the book entitled : 'There is corruption...and there is...CORRUPTION - An exposé of turning a blind eye to corporate bribery, fraud and greed in Australia', published by the ETU Vic Branch. In July 2014 Boyd went on Long Service Leave, and formally retired from the Victorian Trades Hall Council in November of that year, though he remained an active member of the CFMEU and continued to serve on several committees as a CFMEU representative. From 2015 onwards Boyd became a part-time freelance writer on industrial, political and social issues, continuing on particularly as a co-editor of the Victorian building industry's quarterly magazine ON SITE. In 2017 he took a particular interest in the viability, effectiveness and fairness of the 30 year old industry superannuation scheme set up by the Hawke/Keating governments progressively between 1983 and 1992. A progressive newspaper the Green Left Weekly published a two part critical analysis of the issue-July 11 and July 18, 2017. In June 2018 The Victorian Branch of the Electrical Trades Union, led by Troy Gray, published a more comprehensive book on the industry superannuation issue by Boyd, entitled" "DONT FORGET SUPER" (see details below).

== Personal background ==
Brian Boyd was born in Belfast, Northern Ireland on 17 July 1951. He immigrated to Australia in 1956 with his father (Thomas Boyd), his mother (Sarah "Sadie" Boyd née Toan), his brother Leonard "Lenny" and sister Lynne. His youngest brother David was born in Australia. Brian grew up in the industrial Latrobe Valley, specifically Morwell where he graduated from Morwell High School in 1969.

From 1970 to 1976 he tried various tertiary institutions before graduating from La Trobe University with a BA Dip Ed. Between 1979 and 1991 he was married to fellow trade unionist Mary Bluett having three children Tiffany (deceased), Nicole and Rory. In 2010 (5/6) he married longtime partner Christine Thomas.

In Dec 2010 IR academic Gordon McCaskie, overseen by Swinburne University professor Dr Peter Love, successfully completed a master's degree based on a biographical thesis on Brian Boyd's industrial and political life. By Dec 2012 this thesis was published as:"Brian Boyd-A biography of a trade unionist"by Gordon McCaskie,ISBN 978-3-659-24215-1.Price 68 euros.Published by Lambert Academic Press (go to Google of L.A.P. then Title, then project Number 66228, then ISBN for ordering).

Boyd became world-renowned when he famously said, "John Howard is as welcome in Melbourne today as a yellow-bellied black snake at a barbecue!" at an anti-WorkChoices rally in 2006. At a "BUST THE BUDGET" rally in Melbourne 12 June 2014, Brian Boyd told the anti-Federal government protesters in Bourke St. that Prime Minister Tony Abbott and his Treasurer Joe Hockey that they "as welcome in Melbourne today as two feral cane toads in a backyard swimming pool".

== Bibliography ==
- Inside the BLF: a union self-destructs by Brian Boyd, Melbourne, Vic. : Ocean, (1991). ISBN 1-875284-44-3
- "Full Moon Over Mindanao-A trade union trip to the Philippines" by Brian Boyd Melbourne :Publicity Works,(1993),ISBN 0-646-17758-3
- "Melbourne Trades Hall 150th Anniversary Commemoration Booklet 1859-2009 by Brian Boyd et al. Melbourne :VTHC/THLI publication (2009),ISBN 978-0-9588846-7-9
- "There is corruption...and then there is...CORRUPTION! An exposé of turning a blind eye to corporate bribery, fraud and greed in Australia", compilation and commentary by VTHC Secretary

  Brian Boyd published by ETU Vic JUNE 2014.

- "DON'T FORGET SUPER" by Brian Boyd Melbourne, published by Electrical Trades Union -Vic (June 2018), ISBN 978-0-646-98668-5
