= Guilhermina Suggia =

Portuguese cellist (1885–1950)

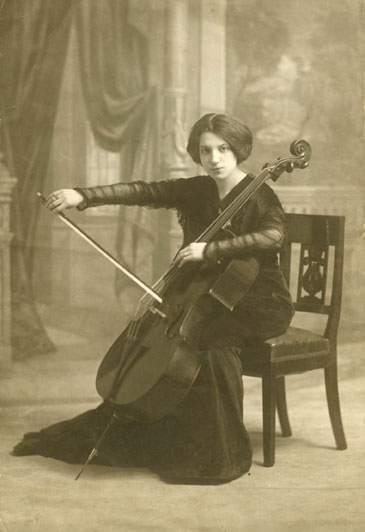
- Suggia, in an undated photo
- Born: Guilhermina Augusta Xavier de Medim Suggia Carteado Mena; 27 June 1885; Porto, Portugal
- Died: 30 July 1950 (aged 65); Porto, Portugal
- Occupation: Cellist
- Years active: 1897–1949
- Style: Classical
- Spouse: Jose Mena (m. 1927; died 1949)
- Partners: Pablo Casals; Edward Hudson

Guilhermina Augusta Xavier de Medim Suggia Carteado Mena (27 June 1885 – 30 July 1950), known as Guilhermina Suggia, was a Portuguese cellist. She studied in Paris with Pablo Casals and built up an international reputation. She spent many years living in the United Kingdom, where she was particularly celebrated. She retired in 1939, but emerged from retirement to give concerts in Britain. Her last was in 1949, the year before her death.

Suggia bequeathed her instrument to be sold to fund the Suggia Gift, an important British scholarship for young cellists.

== Biography ==
Suggia was born in Porto to a family of Portuguese and Italian descent. Her father was a competent musician and taught her music theory and cello. Such was her progress that by the age of 12 she was appointed principal cellist of the local orchestra, the Orpheon Portuense. In 1904, under the patronage of Queen Maria Amélia of Portugal, she went to study at Leipzig under Julius Klengel. Although Klengel was a professor at the Leipzig Conservatoire, Suggia did not enroll there but rather took private lessons from him.

Within a year, Suggia was asked to appear as a soloist with the Leipzig Gewandhaus Orchestra under its conductor, Arthur Nikisch. From 1906 to 1912, she lived and worked in Paris with the cellist Pablo Casals. It was generally believed, incorrectly, that the two were married, and Suggia was sometimes billed as "Mme P. Casals-Suggia". She began to tour internationally, building her reputation. She and Casals were rated as "the world's leading cellists". Casals was close friends with composer Donald Tovey, who wrote his "Sonata for Two Cellos" for the pair. On his visiting the couple to present the work in 1912, an unknown event occurred between Suggia and Tovey which caused strain on the relationship between Suggia and Casals and the friendship between Tovey and Casals. After they separated, Suggia retained her admiration for Casals, describing him as pre-eminent among living cellists. In 1914, she formed a trio with the violinist Jelly d'Arányi and the pianist Fanny Davies.

During the period of her residence in Britain during the 1920s and 1930s, she was a frequent visitor to Lindisfarne Castle in northern England, where a cello now rests in the Music Room in commemoration of her time spent there. Her "Montagnana" cello rests in the Conservatório de Música do Porto, in her home town in Portugal.

Edward Hudson, the founder of the British magazine Country Life is said to have been infatuated by Guilhermina. He was briefly engaged to her and bought her the aforementioned Montagnana cello, which she is shown playing in the portrait by Augustus John (See § Legacy).

In 1927, Suggia married Jose Mena, an X-ray specialist. During World War II, Suggia and her husband returned to Portugal, where she lived in retirement. She visited Britain after the war, giving performances of Edward Elgar's Cello Concerto in aid of charity. She gave her last concerts at the Edinburgh Festival in 1949 and in Bournemouth later the same year.

While in Britain in the 1920s, she taught various British cellists, and after returning to Portugal she continued to teach, with notable students including Amaryllis Fleming, Thelma Reiss, Sheridan Russell and Peggie Sampson. Russell criticised her as a teacher because she attempted to make students imitate her precise technique.

Suggia died of cancer in Porto on 30 July 1950, at the age of 65, a year after the death of her husband.

== Recordings ==
Suggia made a small number of phonograph recordings. They include Haydn's D major Concerto with John Barbirolli, and Saint-Saëns's A minor Concerto with Lawrance Collingwood. They were reissued on compact disc in 1989 (EMI EH761083-1). A compilation CD was released in 2004 with performances of Haydn, Max Bruch and Édouard Lalo (Dutton CDBP9748).

== Legacy ==
Suggia bequeathed her Stradivarius cello to the Royal Academy of Music in London, to be sold to fund a scholarship for young cellists. The Suggia Gift, established in 1955, has since 1995 been administered by the Musicians' Benevolent Fund. The first holder was Derek Simpson, and other winners include Rohan de Saram (1955), Jacqueline du Pré (1956–1961), Robert Cohen (1967–1971), Hafliði Hallgrímsson, Steven Isserlis, Raphael Wallfisch and Julian Lloyd Webber. In 2010, it was announced that the 2011 Suggia Gift would be run in association with the 2011 International Guilhermina Suggia Festival, held in her native city.

The large auditorium at Casa da Música in Porto is named Sala Suggia in her honour.

TAP Air Portugal, the national airline of Portugal, named one of its aeroplanes (an Airbus A319) after her.

Probably the most famous image of Suggia is the oil portrait by the Welsh artist Augustus John, whose daughter Amaryllis Fleming later became a well-known cellist herself. This picture was commissioned initially by Edward Hudson, on which work begun in 1920 but was not finished until 1923. It was shown at the Carnegie Institute in Pittsburgh in 1924, bought by an American but later returned to England and presented to the Tate Gallery. The painting measures 186 by 165 centimetres (73 in × 65 in). The Manchester Guardian wrote of this work that it "will serve to remind future generations that here was a musician who matched the nobility of her art with that of her presence on the concert platform." Photographs of Suggia by Alvin Langdon Coburn are held in the George Eastman House Still Photograph Archive, and a photographic portrait by Bertram Park is in the National Portrait Gallery, London.
