= Peggie Sampson =

Peggy Sampson
- Born: Margaret Sampson; February 16, 1912; Edinburgh, Scotland
- Died: May 17, 2004 (aged 92)
- Genres: Classical, early music, Baroque music
- Occupations: Cellist, teacher
- Instruments: Violoncello, viola da gamba

Peggie Sampson (1912–2004) was a cellist, viola da gambist and educator.

== Early life ==
Margaret Sampson was born February 16, 1912, in Edinburgh, Scotland. She was the daughter of Ida Binney and Ralph Sampson, an astronomer. Peggie was raised as a Quaker and began studying cello at the age of eight, first studying with Ruth Waddell. She would later study with Guilhermina Suggia in Portugal. Sampson enrolled at the University of Edinburgh in 1929 where she took classes with Donald Francis Tovey, graduating in 1932 with a Bachelors in Music. During this time she also studied under Diran Alexanian at the Normale de Musique in Paris (she would travel there during the summers of 1930 through 1934) and also privately with Nadia Boulanger.

After graduation, Sampson performed in England and Holland while also serving as Tovey's teaching assistant from 1937 to 1944. From 1935 to 1937 she studied intermittently with Emanuel Feuermann and in 1946 she studied with Pablo Casals. She also performed with the Carter Trio. She then moved to the University of Manitoba in Canada to take up a teaching position in 1951. She would remain in this position for almost twenty years.

== Teaching career ==
Sampson was hired by the University of Manitoba to teach music theory, history, and cello. She also gave private lessons and in 1961 was commissioned by the university to set up an experimental music programme for gifted children. Several children in this class went on to become professional musicians, including Stephen Cera, Laurie Duncan, Mayda Narvey, and Dace Stauvers. In addition, some of her private students, Gisela Depkat, Kenneth Murphy, and Paul Pulford, and Lynne Odeh (née Rudiak) became professional cellists.

She would return to the University of Edinburgh in 1960–61 to complete a doctorate in performance and to study new methods of music education for children. In 1970, Sampson took up a post at York University as a professor at the Department of Music. She was to teach theory and set up a programme for viols. She also taught at the University of Victoria in the summers from 1973 through to 1975.

== Performance career ==
Sampson became one of the most prominent cellists and viola da gambists in Canada. Once in Winnipeg, Sampson continued to perform with the Corydon Trio (Lea Foli and Gerald Stanick) and the University Chamber Music Group. In 1963 she founded the Manitoba University Consort with Christine Mather which performed music composed between 1100 and 1800. Both Mather and Sampson were responsible for the collection and transcription of music for the group. It was during this period that Sampson became interested in the gamba and by the end of the 1960s it had replaced the cello as her main instrument. During this time she also commissioned work to expand the modern repertoire for the viola da gamba.

As part of the Manitoba University Consort, Sampson performed at Expo '67 as well as touring in Europe and performing at the Aldeburgh Festival in 1966 and 1968. The group also performed at the opening of the National Arts Centre in Ottawa. The group disbanded with Sampson moved to Toronto in 1970.

Once in Toronto, Sampson continued to perform with her focus now on early music and the viola da gamba.

She was invited to perform three times at the Aldeburgh Festival, in 1972, 1974 and 1976.

Sampson and her students also performed under the name of the Hart House Consort of Viols at the University of Toronto in 1977–1978.

Sampson formed Quatre en Concert with Christine Harvey, Michael Purves-Smith and Deryck Aird and they performed in Holland and Canada from 1974 to 1976.

Some notable performances during her career include:

- Bach's "Passions"
- Murray Adaskin's "Two pieces" in 1972
- David Rosenboom's "The seduction of Sapientia", 1975
- Rudolf Komorous' "At your memory the transparent tears fall like molten lead", 1976

== Later life ==
Sampson retired from full-time teaching at York in 1977 but continued to teach at Wilfrid Laurier University until 1984 and was active in the early music scene in Toronto. She lived with her long time companion Juliette del Junco in Toronto and died at the age of 92.

== Discography ==
- Eckhardt-Gramatté Duo concertante; Suite No. 6 - Tovey Elegiac Variations. Irons piano. (Ca 1966). RCI 224/RCA CCS-1018
- Handel - Bach - Locke. Redekop-Penner harpsichord. 1969. CBC SM-110
- Ortiz - de Chambonnières - Schenk - Cabezon - Couperin - anonymous. Redekop-Fink harpsichord. 1974. CBC SM-229
- Ortiz - Schenk - Buxtehude - Marais - Bach - Bloch. Redekop-Penner harpsichord. 1968. CBC SM-69
- Rosenboom The Seduction of Sapientia - M. Adaskin Two Pieces for Solo Viola da Gamba - Sampson Improvisation on a Theme from Tobias Hume. 1976–7. Music Gallery Editions MGE-7
- Works for Viola da Gamba and Harpsichord: Marin Marais - Tobias Hume. S. Shapiro harpsichord. (Ca 1977). Orion ORS-74162
- Viola da Gamba Suites: Marin Marais - S. Shapiro, Harpsichord. (2006) Marquis Classics Distribution EMI

== Awards and honours ==
- Canadian Music Council medal (1985)
- Hon. Doctor of Laws degree from Wilfrid Laurier University (1987)
- Hon. Doctor of Letters degree from York University (1988)
- Peggy Sampson Scholarship awarded by York University
