= Oswald Toynbee Falk =

English stockbroker and economist (1879–1972)

Oswald Toynbee Falk (1879 – 1972) was a stockbroker and economist, born in the Toxteth area of Liverpool on 25 May 1879 to Hermann John Falk and Rachel Russell Everard Toynbee. He was the nephew of social philosopher and economist Arnold Toynbee. Falk attended Rugby School and Balliol College, Oxford where he trained as an actuary. He worked for the National Mutual Life Assurance Society and became a fellow of the Institute of Actuaries before leaving the profession in 1914. Afterwards he joined the London stock exchange and in 1917 was invited by John Maynard Keynes to work at the Treasury where he proved himself to be a gifted ‘practical economist’.

Falk bought Lindesfarne Castle from Edward Hudson, the founder of Country Life magazine in 1922 for £22,000 but only owned it a short time before selling on to Edward de Stein, a merchant banker.

== Life and career ==
Oswald Falk's grandfather Herman Eugene Falk (1820–1898) was a Polish immigrant from Danzig (Gdańsk), who had arrived in England around 1839 and made a modest fortune trading from Liverpool in coal, iron, grain, silk and guano. His maternal grandfather was the otologist Joseph Toynbee. At the time of his son's birth in Liverpool, Falk's father Hermann John Falk was studying law.

After Rugby, where he became known by the nickname 'Foxy', Falk studied at Balliol, the same college where his uncle, Arnold Toynbee, had tutored from 1878. He described his time at Oxford as like a 'delicious novel by Henry James'. In correspondence with William Sydney Robinson, Falk claimed that during his school days he solved Cambridge Tripos mathematical problems in his sleep and was able to write the solution on waking in the morning.

Falk was married to Florence Ethel Hengler on 29 March 1906 and was admitted a member of the London stock exchange in 1914. He spent a lot of time with John Maynard Keynes who, Robert Skidelsky has argued, owed to Falk “his superb understanding of the unruly financial mechanism of capitalism”. Falk became a partner in stockbrokers Buckmaster & Moore in 1918 before joining Keynes' team at the Paris peace conference in 1919. He was awarded a CBE in 1920. Little is known of his marriage to Florence but it did not last as in 1912 Falk was married to Diana Gwendolen Edith Cecil Stracey with whom he had two sons.

== Politics and later life ==
Throughout his life Falk's politics were of the right, becoming more conservative as he grew older, which took him away from Keynes' more liberal politics. After he retired, Falk lived in Tall Trees, Boars Hill, near Oxford. He died on 12 November 1972 at the age of 93.
