= Sheridan Russell =

Sheridan William Robin Russell (23 March 1900 – 9 April 1991) was a cellist, hospital social worker, and patron of the arts. He was Head Almoner at the National Hospital for Neurology and Neurosurgery and founded the Paintings in Hospitals charity.

== Biography ==
Russell was the younger son of the professor of singing and the San Carlo and later Boston Opera director Henry Russell and his wife, Nina (née Andrade). He was partially of Jewish descent through his parents and of Spanish and Portuguese descent through his mother. He was born in Mayfair, London.

Russell did not speak until he was three years old. At five years of age, he began to learn the cello. As a child in Paris, he was frequently taken to lunch with Claude Debussy. It was Debussy who diagnosed Russell as being partially deaf. He also knew many musicians, singers, conductors and composers, including Mary Garden, André Caplet, Felix Weingartner, Landon Ronald, Freya Stark and Thelma Reiss. He initially trained as a cellist, attending the Guildhall School of Music, where he was taught by W. H. Squire, and later had lessons with Guilhermina Suggia and Felix Salmond. He played quintets professionally with the Léner Quartet in the late 1920s, and gave the earliest performances in England of cello concertos by Paul Hindemith and Arthur Honegger.

During World War II, Russell worked at Bletchley Park and then for British Intelligence in Italy. In 1945, he trained as a hospital social worker, and is described by Phyllis Willmott in the Oxford Dictionary of National Biography as the "first male student in an entirely female profession". He worked at the National Hospital for Nervous Diseases, and was known as Britain's first male almoner. He said in a 1972 lecture that he was motivated to start the initiative to place original artworks in hospitals by the way in which reproductions were "treated rather like furniture which nobody really looked at", adding that he preferred "less good but original paintings". Two of the first artists that he persuaded to lend paintings were Jacob Epstein and Matthew Smith.

He married the social worker and university teacher Katherine Stewart, known as "Kit", on 1 June 1957. He appeared as a castaway on the BBC Radio programme Desert Island Discs on 4 April 1970. After his hospital career, Russell began to play the cello in public again and organised concerts of chamber music for children, and informal soirées with musician friends at the couple's home in Cheyne Walk, described by David Piachaud in The Guardian as "unrehearsed and uninhibited" and "usually brilliant".

Russell died at his home in London on 9 April 1991. A book on him, Sheridan's Story, was published privately by his wife in 1993, and all 1800 copies were sold. Piachaud describes him as a "bright-eyed elfin figure of warmth and wit".
