= William Emmett Murphy =

Trade unionist in Victoria, Australia

William Emmett Murphy (12 May 1841 – 26 February 1921) was an Australian trade unionist and aspiring politician.

He was born in Dublin on 12 May 1841, (Note: The Dictionary of Australasian Biography gives his year of birth as 1843.) the son of William Murphy, a publican. He was educated at the Christian Brothers' College and originally intended to enter the priesthood. He was apprenticed as a cabinet-maker to his uncle at Liverpool. In 1860, he volunteered as one of "O'Reilly's Brigade" for the defence of Pope Pius IX, and landed at Civita Vecchia, but with the other Irish volunteers was soon shipped back to Ireland. He finished his apprenticeship and helped to found the Liverpool Cabinetmakers' and Upholsterers' Apprentices' Society. He emigrated to Melbourne in 1865, where he joined the Cabinet Makers' Association, and married Louisa Walsh in 1869.

He was Secretary of the Melbourne Trades Hall Committee from 1877 and the first Secretary of the Melbourne Trades Hall Council from 1884, serving until he was removed from office in September 1886. He reconciled with Trades Hall in 1889 and played a prominent role in Victoria in the 1890 Australian maritime dispute, including attempts to find employment for strikers

He was a candidate for the Victorian Legislative Assembly seat of North Melbourne at the 1886 election but he was defeated by 186 votes (2.8%). He stood again at the 1889 election but was again unsuccessful, defeated by 324 votes (13.6%).

He died at Daylesford on 26 February 1921 (aged 79).
