= Victorian Trades Hall Council =

Group of trade unions in Australia

VTHC
- Victorian Trades Hall Council
- Founded: 1856; 170 years ago
- Headquarters: Melbourne, Victoria
- Location: Australia
- Members: 500,000+
- Key people: Luke Hilakari, Secretary
- Affiliations: ACTU
- Website: www.weareunion.org.au

The Victorian Trades Hall Council (VTHC) is a representative body of trade union organisations, known as a labour council, in the state of Victoria, Australia. It comprises 43 affiliated trade unions and professional associations, and eight regional Trades and Labour Councils of Victoria.

The eight regional Trades and Labour Councils are Ballarat Regional Trades & Labour Council, Bendigo Trades Hall Council, Geelong Trades Hall Council, Gippsland Trades & Labour Council Inc., Goulburn Valley Trades & Labour Council, Sunraysia Trades & Labour Council Inc., North-East Border Trades & Labour Council and South-West Trades & Labour Council. The Victorian Trades Hall Council is affiliated with the Australian Council of Trade Unions.

Affiliation to the VTHC is open to any industrial organisation of employees (most commonly called a trade union) with at least 20 financial members. Delegates from affiliated organisations are elected to meet as the Victorian Trades Hall Council. There are monthly Council meetings, and an Executive which meets fortnightly to administer the union affairs, particularly matters of an urgent nature.

== Responsibilities ==
The Victorian Trades Hall Council is responsible for:

- Co-ordinating union activities and campaigns, involving more than one union.
- Providing assistance with research, negotiations and advocacy to affiliated organisations.
- Lobbying State Parliament for social and industrial reforms.
- Providing a public point of contact for general enquiries on Victorian unions.
- Administering Melbourne Trades Hall, which provides offices and meeting rooms for the Council and Executive, as well as leasing space to affiliated unions and other activist and social change groups.

== Secretaries of the Victorian Trades Hall Council ==
- Luke Hilakari, 2014–present
- Brian Boyd, 2005–2014
- Leigh Hubbard, 1995–2005
- John Halfpenny, 1988–1995
- Peter Marsh, 1985–1987
- K. C. (Ken) Stone, 1969–1985
- Michael Christopher Charles (Mick) Jordan, 1964–1969
- James Victor (JV) Stout, 1938–1964
- Albert Monk, 1933–1938
- William (Billy) Duggan, 1931–1933
- Maurice Boyce Duffy, 1929–1930
- Jack Holloway, 1920–1929
- Charles Gray, 1910–1920
- James Munn, July 1910 – September 1910
- Stephen Barker, 1901–1910
- John George Barrett, 1893–1901
- David Bennet, 1886–1893
- William Emmett Murphy, 1877–1886

== History ==
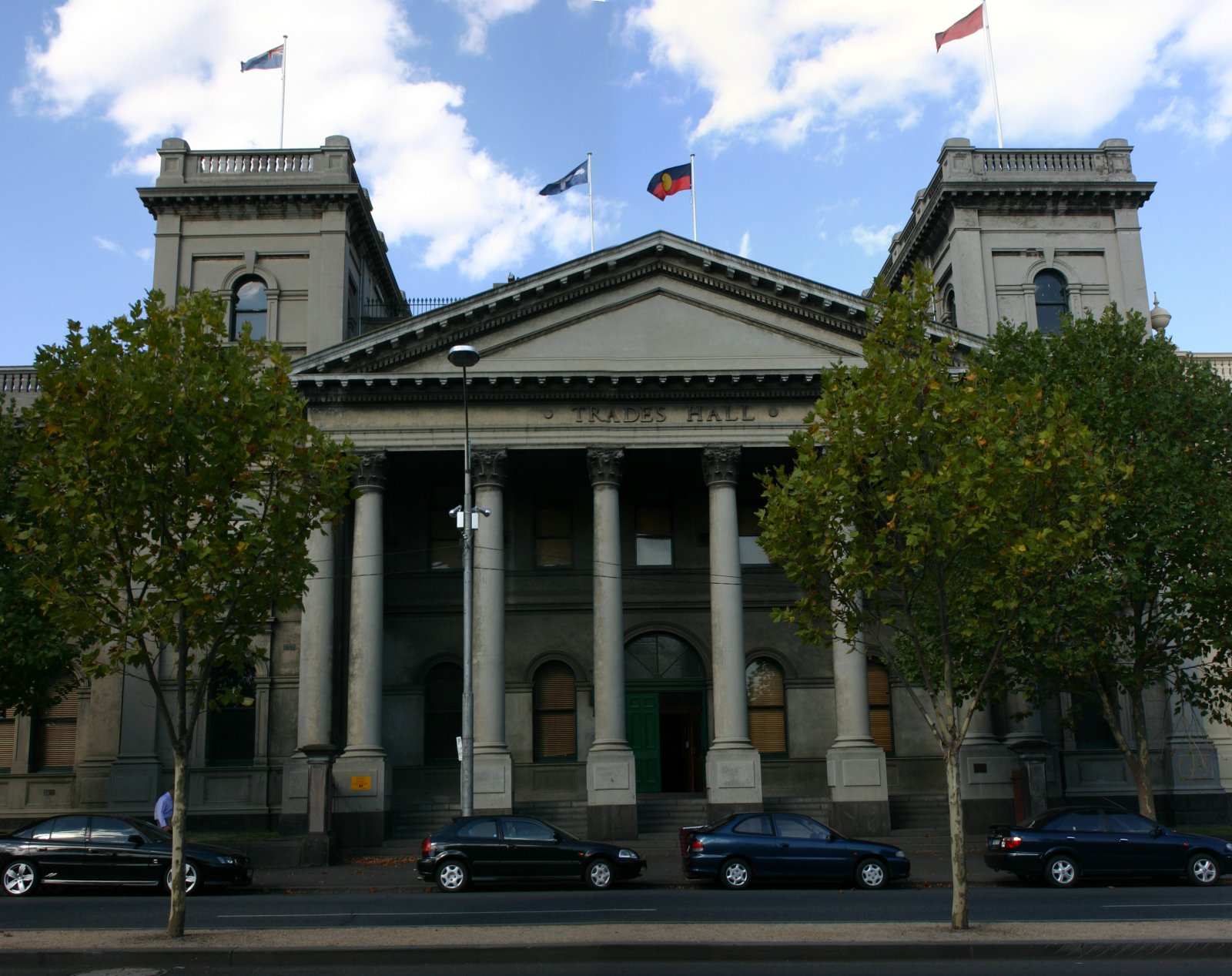
Victorian Trades Hall, the headquarters of the Victorian Trades Hall Council

In 1856 stonemasons in Melbourne won the eight-hour day, one of the first occasions in the world where organised workers had achieved this without loss of pay. The same year Melbourne Trades Hall Committee was formed and received a grant of land to build a Melbourne Trades Hall. The world's first workers' parliament, the Trades Hall was built on the site in 1859. It was built in the style of the parliament buildings which were just down the road, and over the years has been further developed. With increasing activity during the 1880s in the Australian labour movement the committee became a Council to reflect its expanding role, though the full title, Victorian Trades Hall Council was only formally adopted in 1968.

In recent times, as well as being the centre for union activity, the Trades Hall Council has opened the Trades Hall building to many cultural events, plays, and concerts including the Melbourne Comedy Festival – concentrating on political and 'on the edge' performances. It was classified by the National Trust and is included in the Register of Historic Buildings (Victoria).

Some notable members of the Trades Hall Council from the 1880s include William Trenwith and Chummy Fleming, both from the Victorian Operative Bootmakers Union.

=== Issues ===
Leigh Hubbard as Secretary of the VTHC, along with Sharan Burrow, President of the ACTU, signed an international labour declaration against the war on Iraq in February 2003 involving over 200 unions and 550 union leaders from 53 countries representing 130 million workers. The VTHC is an affiliate of the Victorian Peace Network.

VTHC President Kevin Bracken sparked outrage on 20 October 2010 when he told Jon Faine's ABC talk-back program the 911 attacks on the World Trade Center were not the result of terrorist activity. He said the story was a conspiracy that "didn't stand up" to scientific scrutiny.
