= National Mutual Life Assurance Society =

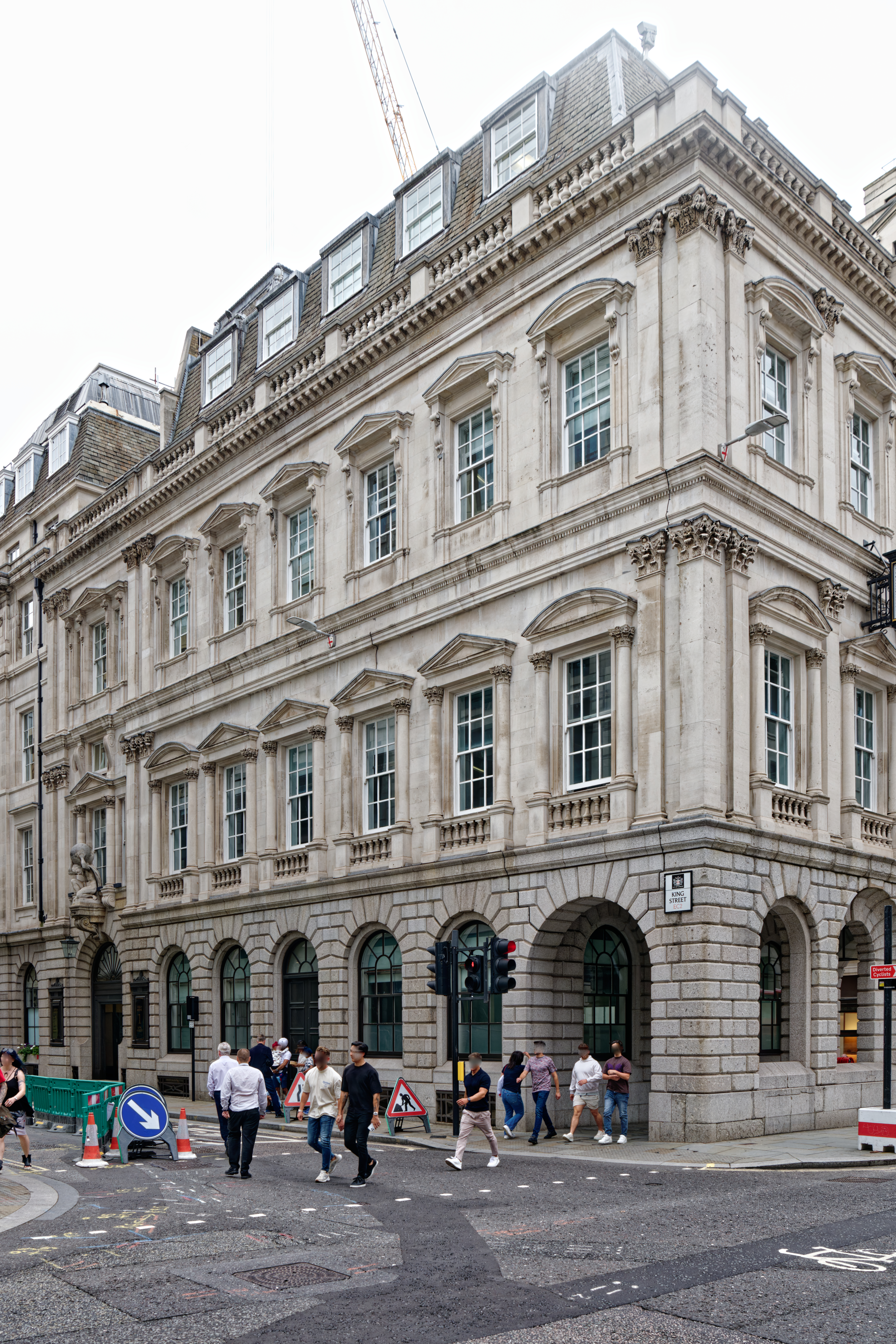
- The company's head office on the corner of 92 Cheapside and King Street
- Industry: Insurance
- Founded: 1896; 130 years ago
- Defunct: 2002
- Fate: Demutualisation
- Successor: GE Capital
- Headquarters: London, England

The National Mutual Life Assurance Society was formed in 1896 by the merger of the National Life Assurance Society and the Mutual Life Assurance Society. It was notable for the Chairmanship of John Maynard Keynes between 1921 and 1938 when he developed the concept of active investment of its fixed interest portfolio, and investment in equities, long before the post-war “cult of the equity”. The National Mutual was demutualised in 2001 and the business transferred to GE Capital.

== History ==
=== The two societies ===
The National Life Assurance Society was formed as a company in December 1830. After a successful period in the 1830s, the growth in new business declined in the 1840s. In response, the directors decided to convert to mutual status in 1847. Shortly after its formation, National Life appointed its first agent in Manchester followed by other cities. By the time of the merger, National Life had branches in five leading English cities together with agencies in Hamburg, Asia and Mauritius. The overseas operations had come through the rescue of Whittingham Life Assurance in 1894 and only Mauritius was retained (until independence in 1968).

The Mutual Life Assurance Society was founded by brothers James and William Burchell. They and Jonathan Hayne started the Society by guaranteeing the first £20,000 of losses. At the first AGM in 1835, the chairman claimed that the greater certainty of bonuses on maturing policies was in advance of all other mutuals. In 1848, the Mutual Life bought the lease of 39 King Street, followed by number 38. The buildings were demolished, and a new office opened in 1859; the merged entity remained on the site until 1960. As with the National, the Mutual Life had also expanded regionally and had seven branches at the time of the merger.

=== National Mutual and Maynard Keynes ===
The priority post-merger was consolidation. The number of British branches was reduced to eight, and of the overseas agencies, only the profitable Mauritius was retained. It was not until 1906 that sums assured regained the combined level of the merged parties. John Maynard Keynes joined the Board in 1919, becoming Chairman 1921. Nicolas Davenport, a director from 1932 to 1969, wrote that the Board “contained some outstanding and unconventional intellectuals; as well as Keynes they included Oswald Falk, Keynes’ stockbroker and close collaborator, and Walter Layton, 1st Baron Layton, editor of the Economist. With the support of Falk, Keynes introduced a policy of active trading of the fixed interest stocks, coupled with investment in equities. “Keynes was the first to give [investment trading] the seal of respectability and to apply it to a life assurance fund.”

=== Post-war ===
Post-war growth was slow. “After the regime of Keynes…it was like a return to the dark ages under our new chairmen. Davenport, who was Deputy Chairman through the 1960s described “a slow business decline until a new actuary and manager had been appointed in 1956”. Harry Oram led a review of strategy in 1960 and elected for growth over consolidation with the objective of reducing unit costs. This was accompanied by a move from King Street to a freehold site in Bow Churchyard by St Paul's Cathedral. The business emphasis moved towards pension schemes, term policies and innovative house purchase policies. Investment policy once again emphasised the importance of equities, which reached 50% of assets at its peak – though with less successful results than in the Keynes’ era.

=== Demutualisation ===
National Mutual became increasingly dependent on sophisticated pension products aimed at high earners and lacked the scale to compete in the mainstream market. In March 2001 it announced the appointment of Dresdner Bank to review its mutual status. On 20 November 2001, members voted in favour of demutualisation and the transfer of business to GE Capital in a £435 million deal. This became effective in February 2002, following which National Mutual ceased to trade as an independent entity.
