= Katherine Russell (social worker) =

Katherine Russell OBE
- Born: Katherine Frances Stewart; 6 April 1909; Kensington, London
- Died: 9 July 1998 (aged 89); Westminster, London, England
- Other name: Kit Russell
- Education: Downe House School
- Alma mater: London School of Economics
- Occupations: Social worker university teacher
- Years active: 1931–1976
- Spouse: Sheridan Russell (m. 1957; died 1991)

Katherine Frances Russell OBE (née Stewart; 6 April 1909 – 9 July 1998) was an English social worker and university teacher. She began working as a volunteer for the Time and Talents settlement in Bermondsey and supported families affected by illness, poverty, slum housing and overcrowding. Russell was employed as the community service organiser on Lewisham's Honor Oak housing estate in 1937 and became the warden of the mixed-sex Archers Youth Centre in Southampton during the Second World War. She was appointed the chief administrator of five one-year emergency courses run by the Institute of Almoners in 1945 before becoming a practical work organiser and then as a senior lecturer of the London School of Economics (her alma mater) from 1949 to 1973. Russell was appointed Officer of the Order of the British Empire in 1976.

== Early life ==
On 6 April 1909, Russell was born at 20 Southwell Gardens in Kensington, London, the eldest daughter of seven children (of which she was the second) born to Francis Hugh Stewart, a partner in Gladstone, Wyllie & Co., merchant, and his wife Frances Henrietta. When she was five years old, she was sent home from India to attend a boarding school, and did not see her parents until the conclusion of the First World War. Russell's father died in 1921 and her mother became the organising secretary of the St Pancras Housing Association to support her children. She attended the independent all-girls boarding school Downe House School, and left when she was 18 years old. Russell began working as a volunteer for the Time and Talents settlement that was located in the impoverished dockside area of Bermondsey, providing support in one of London's poorest places by doing youth work, organised children's clubs and giving help to families affected by illness, poverty, slum housing and overcrowding. In 1931, she enrolled at the London School of Economics (LSE) and did a Certificate in Social Science under the tutelage of Eileen Younghusband. Russell earned the certificate in 1933.

== Career ==
Although it was her intention to become a nurse, she went back to the Time and Talents settlement and became the warden of its Dockhead youth club in 1933 in the development of community work. Russell was employed by the London Voluntary Service Council in 1937 as the organiser of community service on the Honor Oak housing estate in Lewisham. Following the outbreak of the Second World War, she moved to Southampton and became the warden of the Archers Youth Centre, the city's first mixed youth centre for boys and girls. In 1943, Russell worked with Younghusband at the British Council in training 'allied nationals' for social welfare work that was required for war-torn Western Europe. Following the end of the war in 1945, she became the chief administrator of five emergency courses run by the Institute of Almoners, training medical social workers for one year instead of the usual three, in an attempt to alleviate the shortage of hospital social workers in Britain.

Russell joined the staff of the social science department of the LSE in 1949 after Younghusband persuaded the school to employ the former. She was at first a practical work organiser and then as a senior lecturer. At the conclusion of the academic year, Russell would help students who were struggling pass examiners meetings, and she taught 2,500 students. In 1973, she retired from the LSE. Russell remained as president of the LSE Society for several years, continued her involvement with the relaunch of the Time and Talents charity in Rotherhithe, East London and helped to launch the National Tenants' Resource Centre in Chester. She drafted and distributed via post a detailed questionnaire to 2000 previous LSE social administration students, and largely by personal follow-up, received a 90 per cent response and it was all complied into the 1981 book Changing Course.

== Personal life ==
Russell was married to the cellist Sheridan Russell from 1 June 1957 until his death in April 1991. She was appointed Officer of the Order of the British Empire "for services to social work training" in the 1976 Birthday Honours. In 1978, Russell was made an honorary fellow of the LSE. She died of "old age" at St George's Nursing Home, Westminster on 9 July 1998 and was buried at Christ Church in Flood Street, Chelsea. A memorial service for Russell took place in the afternoon of 4 November at Christ Church.
