= Victoria Tischler =

British psychologist

Victoria Tischler is a British psychologist, currently Honorary Professor at the University of West London. She is a Chartered Psychologist, and Associate Fellow of the British Psychological Society, Honorary Associate Professor at the University of Nottingham and Senior Fellow at the Institute of Mental Health.

Tischler's doctoral studies focussed on stress and coping in homeless mothers. Her research interests centre on creativity and mental health with a focus on dementia. She is a contributor to Psychreg.

Tischler worked as a curator on the "Art in the Asylum" exhibition, and as a workshop facilitator. She appeared on Antiques Roadshow Detectives commenting on art and mental health, and co-presented on the BBC on the trauma of World War One and creativity. She appeared at the Latitude Festival talking about the place of art and creativity in mental health care. Tischler is a trustee of national arts and health charity Paintings in Hospitals.
