= Walter Buckmaster =

British polo player (1872–1942)

Walter Selby Buckmaster
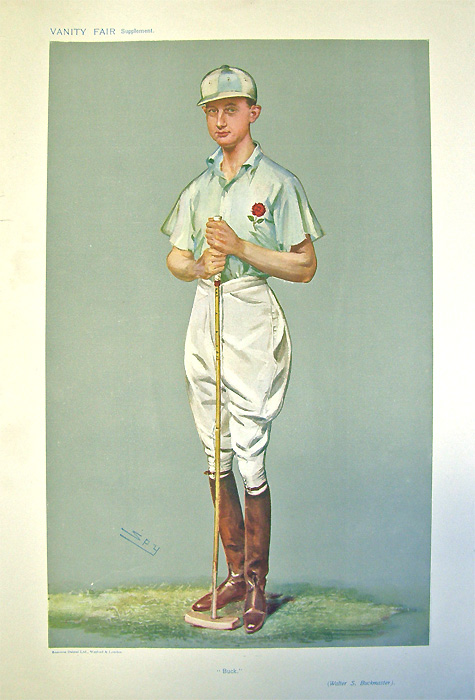
- Vanity Fair caricature by Spy (Leslie Ward), 4 September 1907.
- Born: 16 October 1872; Kingston, Surrey, England
- Died: 30 October 1942 (aged 70); Warwick, Warwickshire, England
- Occupation: Stock broker
- Known for: Olympic Silver Medalist – Polo
- Spouse: Ida Sarah Buckmaster (nee Blyth)

Olympic medal record

Men's polo

Representing United Kingdom
Silver medal – second place	1900 Paris	Team competition
Silver medal – second place	1908 London	Team competition

Walter Selby Buckmaster (16 October 1872 – 30 October 1942) was a British polo player in the 1900 Summer Olympics and in the 1908 Summer Olympics.

== Biography ==
He was born on 16 October 1872 in Wimbledon, Surrey, the son of Thomas Walter Buckmaster (1845–1873) and Emma Caroline Venables (1848–1875). His father's sister, Maria Sarah Buckmaster was the mother of Alfred North Whitehead, the renowned mathematician and philosopher. Buckmaster was educated at Repton and Trinity College, Cambridge. He played association football for both Repton and Cambridge and was a member and later captain of the Cambridge polo team.

From Cambridge he had a career in the stock exchange joining with a fellow old Old Reptonian, Charles Armytage-Moore to become a founding partner in Buckmaster & Moore. He kept up his interest in sport particularly polo, and in 1900 he was part of the BLO Polo Club Rugby Polo at the 1900 Summer Olympics polo team which won the silver medal. In 1908 as a member of the Hurlingham Club he won the Olympic silver medal again. Buckmaster was a member of the winning team in the International Polo Cup, (also called the Newport Cup and the Westchester Cup) in 1902 playing at Hurlingham. The trophy was created in 1876 and was played for by teams from the United States and Great Britain.

He married Ida Sarah Blyth in June 1896 in St Marylebone Church, London. They had two daughters, Eulalie Agnes Selby in 1901 and Beryl Evelyn Tracey in 1904. Although he was over age (42), he served in the Great War (1914–1918) in the Service Sanitaire (Ambulance), attached to the French Army.

Buckmaster lived initially in London's Mayfair at addresses in South and Stratton Streets during the war years and early 1920s. In 1928 moved to the country living at Moreton Manor, Moreton Morrell and became Master of the Warwickshire Foxhounds. He died on 30 October 1942 at Warwick aged 70.

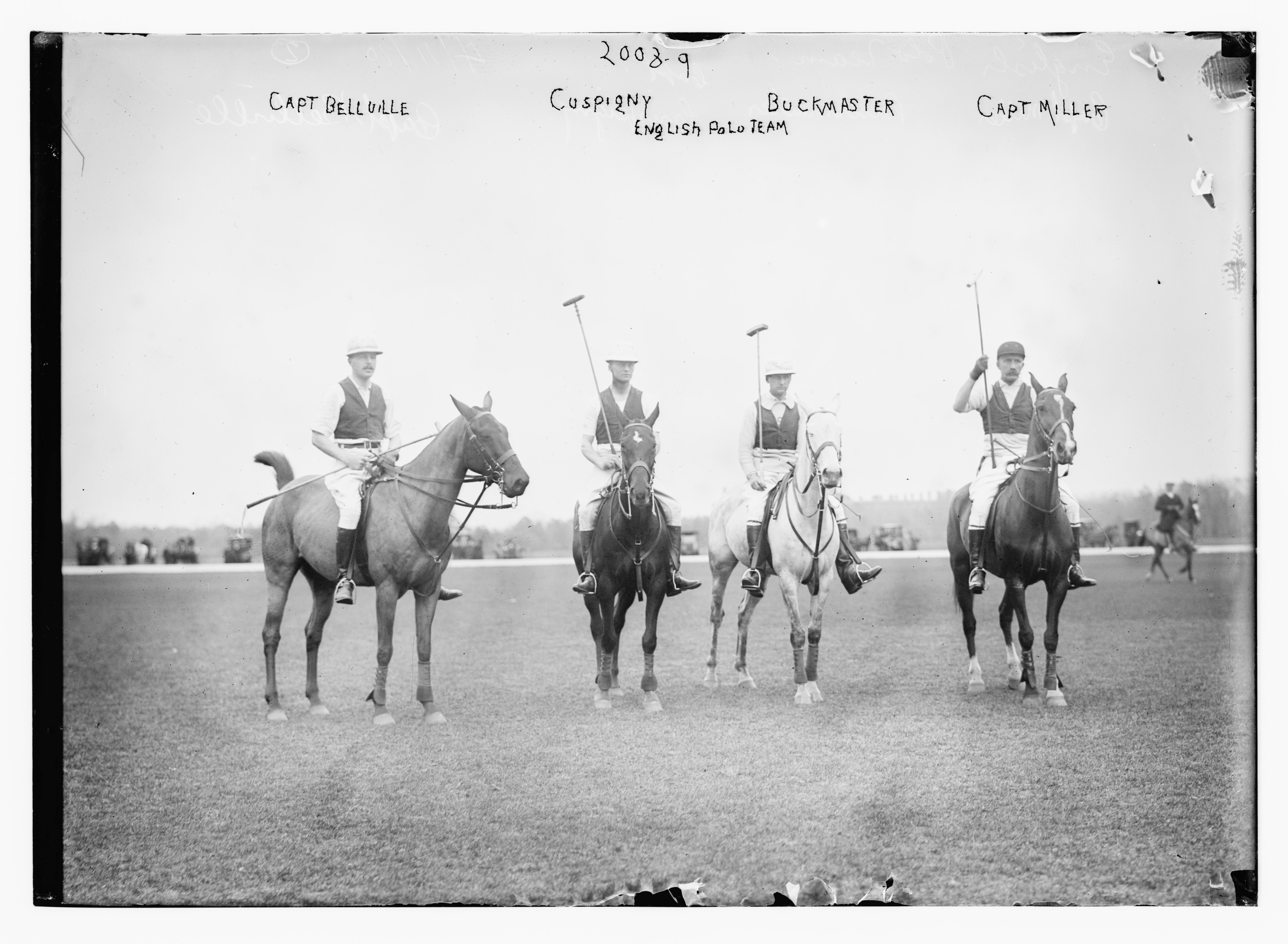

== Sources ==
- The London Gazette, 2 April 1926, Buckmaster & Moore Partnership Notice
- The London Gazette, 26 March 1929, Buckmaster & Moore Partnership Notice
- "English Polo Team Loses Buckmaster". The New York Times. 30 April 1913.
- The New York Times, 4 May 1914, Headline: ‘POLO INVADERS WORRIED’
- Bailey's Magazine of Sports & Pastimes: No. 486 August 1900 Vol. LXXIV, Brief biographical article plus full length image in Polo kit
- Book: 'Hints for Polo Combination', with Captain Lionel Sadleir-Jackson, London, Vinton & Co. 1910,
- National Portrait Gallery: Walter Selby Buckmaster, by Ernest Clarence Elliott, for Elliott & Fry collotype, published 1904 acquired, 1984
- Vanity Fair Print: Walter S. Buckmaster, dated 4 September 1907 The Caption Reads 'Buck'
- Olympic Sports – Polo 1900/1908:
- Newspaper cutting: Boston Evening Transcript, 14 April 1913 (WS Buckmaster Hurt after fall)
- Newspaper cutting: The New York Times, 10 August 1913 (Walter Buckmaster hurt after car crash)
