= Ivor James =

British cellist

Ivor James CBE
- Born: 1882
- Died: 1963 (aged 80–81)
- Education: Royal College of Music
- Occupations: Cellist; music professor
- Years active: 1910s–1960s

Ivor James CBE (1882–1963) was a British cellist. He taught for many years at the Royal College of Music; among his pupils were those who became notable cellists.

== Life ==
James studied under William Whitehouse at the Royal College of Music. After graduating, he joined the English String Quartet, at a time when its violist was Frank Bridge.

In 1919, he became Whitehouse's assistant at the Royal College of Music, and he subsequently taught at the college for 34 years. In his teaching, he was concerned that there should be a strong technical base; also that, in achieving a good interpretation, the line of the music should be considered. His pupils included Hugo Cole, Amaryllis Fleming, Martin Lovett, Audrey Piggott, Thelma Reiss and James Whitehead.

He married a former pupil, Helen Just, in 1928. She was a fellow professor at the college, and a member of the English String Quartet, the Menges Sextet and the Whinyates String Quartet. In 1928, James was made a Fellow of the Royal College of Music (FRCM).

In 1929, he founded a summer school at Westminster College, Cambridge, sponsored by the British Federation of Music Festivals; it is regarded as the first of its kind. In the 1930s, he was a member of the Menges Quartet.

James was appointed Commander of the Order of the British Empire (CBE) in 1953.

In a 1963 obituary in the Royal College of Music Union Magazine, it was stated, "He truly felt music to its very depth and centre. He communicated his musical intention to his pupils in some remarkable way which seems impossible to put into words."
