= Thelma Reiss =

British cellist (1906–1991)

Thelma Reiss (née Reiss-Smith; (Note: She changed her name to Reiss in 1936, and was sometimes credited as Reiss from around 1934.) 2 July 1906 – 17 September 1991) was a British cellist who had an international career as a soloist and chamber musician between 1930 and 1955. Her teachers were Ivor James and Guilhermina Suggia. She was a musical prodigy from an impoverished background who toured in the south-west of England as a young child, and played in theatres, clubs, music halls and restaurants before coming to wider public attention in the early 1930s. In that decade she performed concertos with most major British orchestras, made several tours in Europe, and gave premieres of works by Arnold Bax and George Dyson, before her career was interrupted by the Second World War. After the war, she continued to give recitals, retiring from performance in 1955 due to ill health.

Contemporary accounts of her playing emphasise her "beautiful, unforced tone", according to Margaret Campbell in The Great Cellists, and her "attractive appearance and warm platform personality" made her popular with audiences.

== Early life and education ==
Thelma Reiss-Smith was born on 2 July 1906 in Plymouth, Devon. Her mother was a musician who taught singing and was an amateur violinist; her father had been in the Royal Navy at the local naval base and also kept a public house. She had a sister. After her father's death during the First World War the family was left impoverished. The adverse conditions of her upbringing were reflected in poor health, with Reiss being malnourished and having tuberculosis as a child.

She was a musical prodigy, playing the piano at the age of three, learning the cello with Charles Pike, a Royal Marines Band cellist, from the age of seven and also studying singing and dancing. Her first concert appearance came as a seven year old, playing the Cello Concerto in A minor by Georg Goltermann. She then went on tour in the south-west of England, displaying her musical and dancing skills, including a performance of a scotch reel at the Plymouth Theatre Royal, which a local newspaper described as being the "greatest success". At the age of eleven, she joined a trio entertaining diners at a local restaurant, and other venues where she played as a child included the cinema.

These money-making appearances at local venues such as theatres, clubs and music halls continued even after she gained a scholarship, at the age of thirteen, to train with the cellist Ivor James at the Royal College of Music, who taught her for six years. She later received instruction from the Portuguese cellist Guilhermina Suggia, and was described in 1933 as adhering to Suggia's methods, particularly her "long and straight bowing" technique. Money remained a problem: Plymouth music lovers had raised money for her to attend the scholarship audition and she received financial assistance from this source to attend the college; the conductor Malcolm Sargent also supported her while she was a student.

Reiss-Smith began to play in classical concerts in London, Oxford and Harrow School while still a student, including one at St Michael's, Cornhill in 1926, where her playing was described in The Times as having a "pleasant tone". The following year she played Dvořák's Cello Concerto at the Royal College of Music with the London Symphony Orchestra, conducted by Sargent; a reviewer in The Musical Times describes her as having a "beautiful tone" and considers that she had a "full share of the qualities that foreshadow the first-class artist". Her health problems recurred when she was 21 or 22, with a severe bout of typhoid fever or typhus. After graduating, the economic depression meant that she had trouble finding concert work, and she continued to play in a wide range of venues including in a music-hall variety act accompanied by a jazz band.

== Career ==
Her breakthrough came in 1930, with a recital at the Wigmore Hall, at which she was accompanied by another Royal College of Music student, Joan Black. The programme included a piano reduction of the Elgar Cello Concerto, as well as works by Ravel, Falla and Delius; a Times review describes her as "everywhere assured, enthusiastic, and thoroughly musical", singling out the pair's Delius for praise, although noting that Reiss-Smith was not sufficiently mature to play the Elgar. This success led to her playing the Elgar concerto at the Proms (then in the Queen's Hall), conducted by Henry Wood, the following year; Elgar himself attended the concert. The reviewer for The Times describes her as a "young violoncellist of great promise" and praises her musicality.

Before the Second World War, she performed as a soloist in many orchestral concerts at the Proms and elsewhere, playing with most of the principal British orchestras, as well as many other major orchestras. In addition to Wood, well-known conductors with whom she performed professionally as a soloist include John Barbirolli, Thomas Beecham, Adrian Boult, Malcolm Sargent, Rudolf Schwarz and Felix Weingartner. She performed much of the standard concerto repertoire for the cello, and often appeared as a chamber musician, particularly with the pianist Myra Hess, as well as the pianist Harriet Cohen and the violinist Albert Sammons. She also played in the 1930s with the pianist and composer John Ireland, but Ireland disliked her. She made many radio broadcasts for the BBC. She gave the premieres of Arnold Bax's Sonatina for cello and piano in 1934 with Cohen, and of George Dyson's Fantasy for cello and orchestra at the Three Choirs Festival in 1936. That year, Reiss toured Poland, Finland and the Baltic states with John Hunt, and she returned to Poland and the Baltic states in 1938, both tours being funded by the British Council. She also performed successfully in Madrid, and in Germany in 1937 and 1939.

During the Second World War, she toured Britain with the Council for the Encouragement of Music and the Arts, playing in hospitals and factories, and during the early years continued to give concerts in London. (Note: For example, at the Proms in 1940, and in the National Gallery concert series in 1941) After the war, she continued to perform chamber music, for example, giving recitals with Hess at the National Gallery. Around this time, however, she developed a wasting condition that often prevented her from performing, and which forced her to retire in 1955.

She moved to Suffolk, and in her final years Reiss lived alone in Aldeburgh, where she died on 17 September 1991. A prize was established in her memory at the Royal College of Music. She played on a 1755 cello by Robert Thompson of London, and is not known to have published recordings.

== Reception and style ==
Margaret Campbell writes in The Great Cellists that Reiss's "attractive appearance and warm platform personality" made her popular with audiences, and that contemporary accounts of her playing emphasise her "beautiful, unforced tone". The cellist Sheridan Russell, who was a friend, describes her as having an "extraordinary range of tone, warmth of feeling and superb musicianship".

A 1933 review in The Times describes Reiss-Smith as a "highly accomplished and finely tempered musician", praising her technical skills and a "certain air of elegance" demonstrated by her playing. A review in that newspaper the following year highlights her "lyrical style and delicate phrasing" in the Elgar concerto, but criticises her tempo. In 1935, a Times review compliments her "clean and fluent technique" and "keen sense of tone values" in a performance of Saint-Saëns' Cello Concerto in A minor at the Proms.

An entry in the Radio Times of 1937 assesses Reiss as one of Britain's foremost young cellists, particularly praising a "certain intensive beauty" to her work. A review in Hamburger Anzeiger (quoted by Campbell) on her German debut that year highlights her "outstanding ability" and "marvellous technique", and notes that her "playing moves the audience from beginning to end". A Times review the same year of a Proms performance of Brahms's Double Concerto, with Eda Kersey, writes that Reiss "makes up in skill what she lacks in sheer strength", and particularly praises her phrasing. A more-critical Times review of a performance of the double concerto with Arthur Catterall in 1939 notes that they brought out the work's "vein of romance" and "sweetness", rather than its "strength". A Times review of a 1938 recital describes her as playing with an "accurate ear, a feeling for the shape of a phrase, and a warm, if not powerful, tone even on the higher notes", and highlights her "delicate lightness" in playing Bach and Eccles.

A Times review of a 1950 recital considers that Reiss had "regained and surpassed her old easy mastery" of her instrument after the war, adding that "music drips from her bow" and describing her tone as "like honey".

== References and notes ==
Sources

- Margaret Campbell. The Great Cellists (Robson; 2004) ISBN 9781861056542
- Frances Donaldson. The British Council: The First Fifty Years (Jonathan Cape; 1984) ISBN 9780224020411
- Lewis Foreman. The John Ireland Companion (Boydell & Brewer; 2011) ISBN 9781843836865
- Anita Mercier. Guilhermina Suggia, Cellist (Ashgate; 2008) ISBN 9780754661696
- Paul Spicer. Sir George Dyson: His Life and Music (Boydell & Brewer; 2014) ISBN 9781843839033
- Peter Young, Colin Tyre. Gifted or Able? Realizing Children's Potential (Open University Press; 1992) ISBN 9780335099979
