= Lindisfarne Castle =

16th-century castle on Holy Island, England

- Holy Island, Northumberland, England
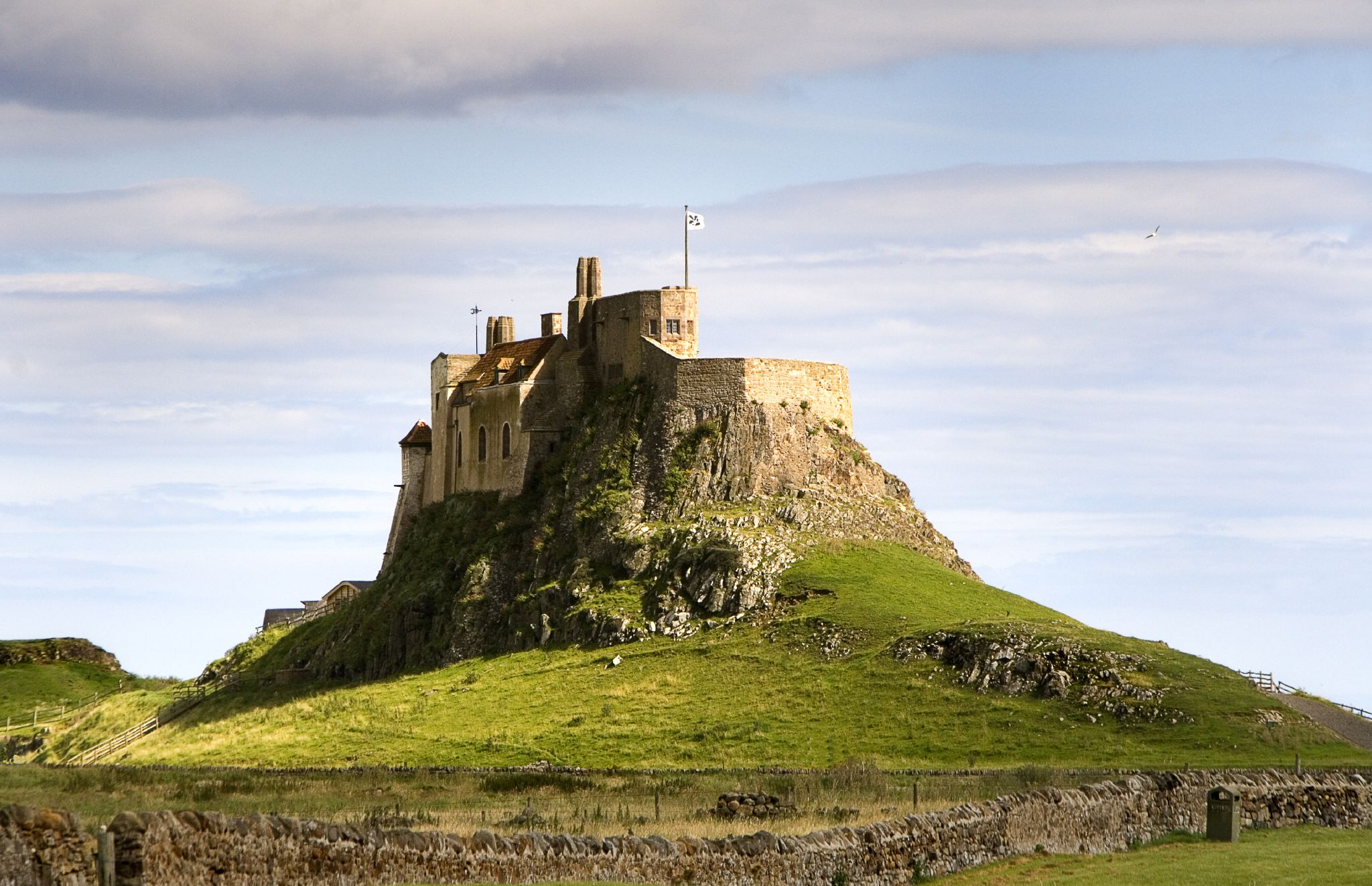
- Lindisfarne Castle, a 16th-century fortification made into a family home by Sir Edwin Lutyens in 1901.

Site information
- Type: Castle

Location
- Location within Northumberland
- Coordinates: 55.669°N 1.785°W
- Grid reference: NU135435

Lindisfarne Castle is a 16th-century castle located on Holy Island, near Berwick-upon-Tweed, Northumberland, England, much altered by Sir Edwin Lutyens in 1901. The island is accessible from the mainland at low tide by means of a causeway.

== History ==
The castle is located in what was once the very volatile border area between England and Scotland; the area was also frequently attacked by Vikings.

Lindisfarne Priory was finally abandoned for the last time for use as a priory ca. 1537 as part of the dissolution of the monasteries. After Henry VIII suppressed the priory, his troops used the remains as a naval store. In 1542 Henry VIII ordered Thomas Manners, 1st Earl of Rutland to fortify the site against possible Scottish invasion. By December 1547, Ralph Cleisbye, Captain of the fort, had guns that included a wheel-mounted demi-culverin, two brass sakers, a falcon, and another fixed demi-culverin.

Taking advantage of the island's strategic location, in 1549, a small fort was built on a high rock known as Beblowe, the highest point of the island, approximately 1 kilometre east of the monastic buildings, and overlooking the harbour. Military engineer Sir Richard Lee saw only a decayed platform and turf rampart when he inspected the area in 1565. In April 1569, Captain William Reed requested funds to complete the walls of the fort. Elizabeth I had work carried out on the fort, strengthening it and providing gun platforms for the new developments in artillery technology. These works in 1570 and 1571 cost £1191. During the construction work, the priory buildings were used as a source of building stone.

When James I came to power in England, he combined the Scottish and English thrones, and the need for the castle declined. At this time the castle was still garrisoned from Berwick and protected the small Lindisfarne Harbour.

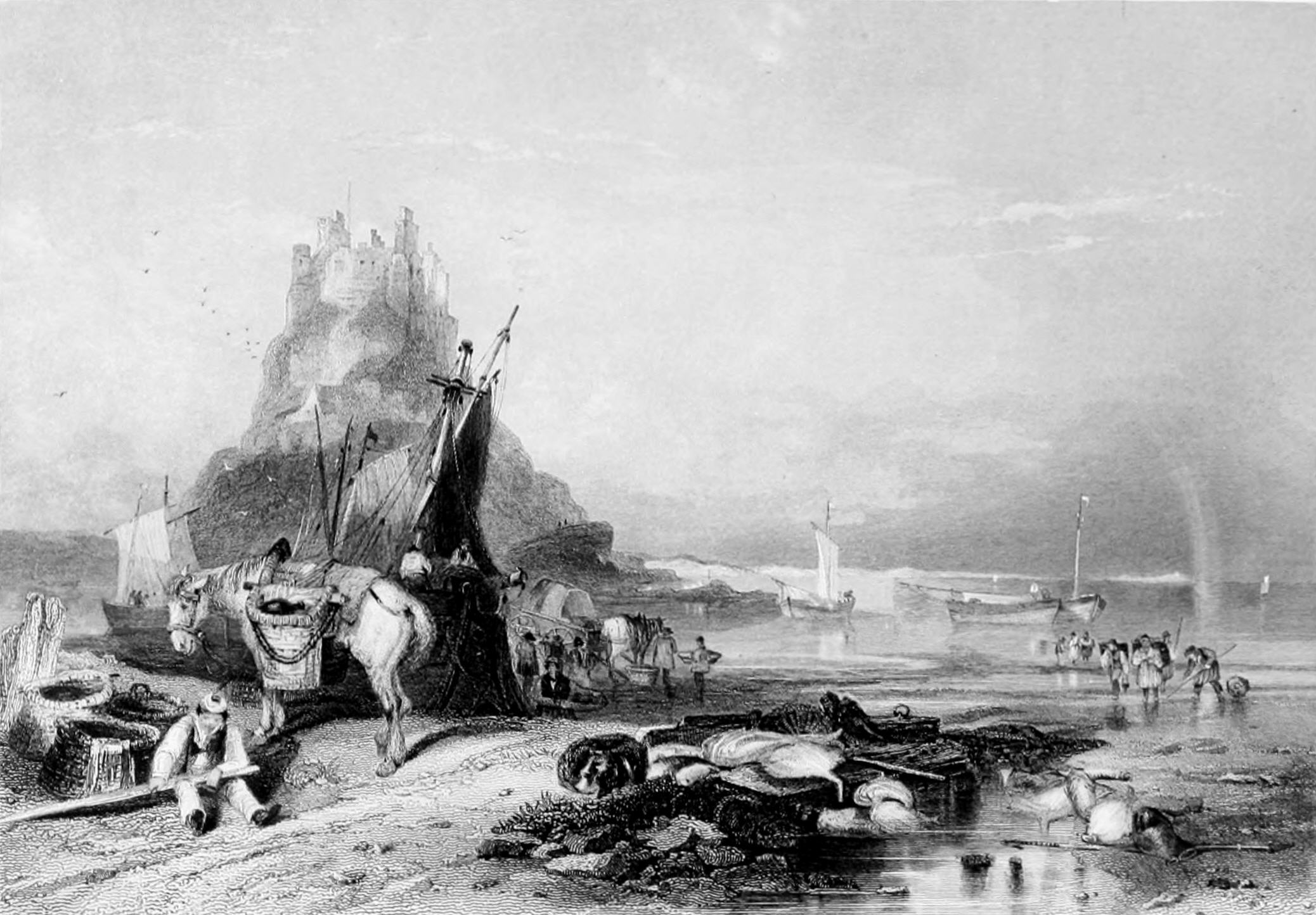
Depiction of the castle in the 1840s

In the eighteenth century, the castle was occupied briefly by Jacobite rebels, but was quickly recaptured by soldiers from Berwick who imprisoned the rebels who dug their way out and hid for nine days close to nearby Bamburgh Castle before making good their escape.

In later years the castle was used as a coastguard look-out and became something of a tourist attraction.

== Lutyens's renovation ==
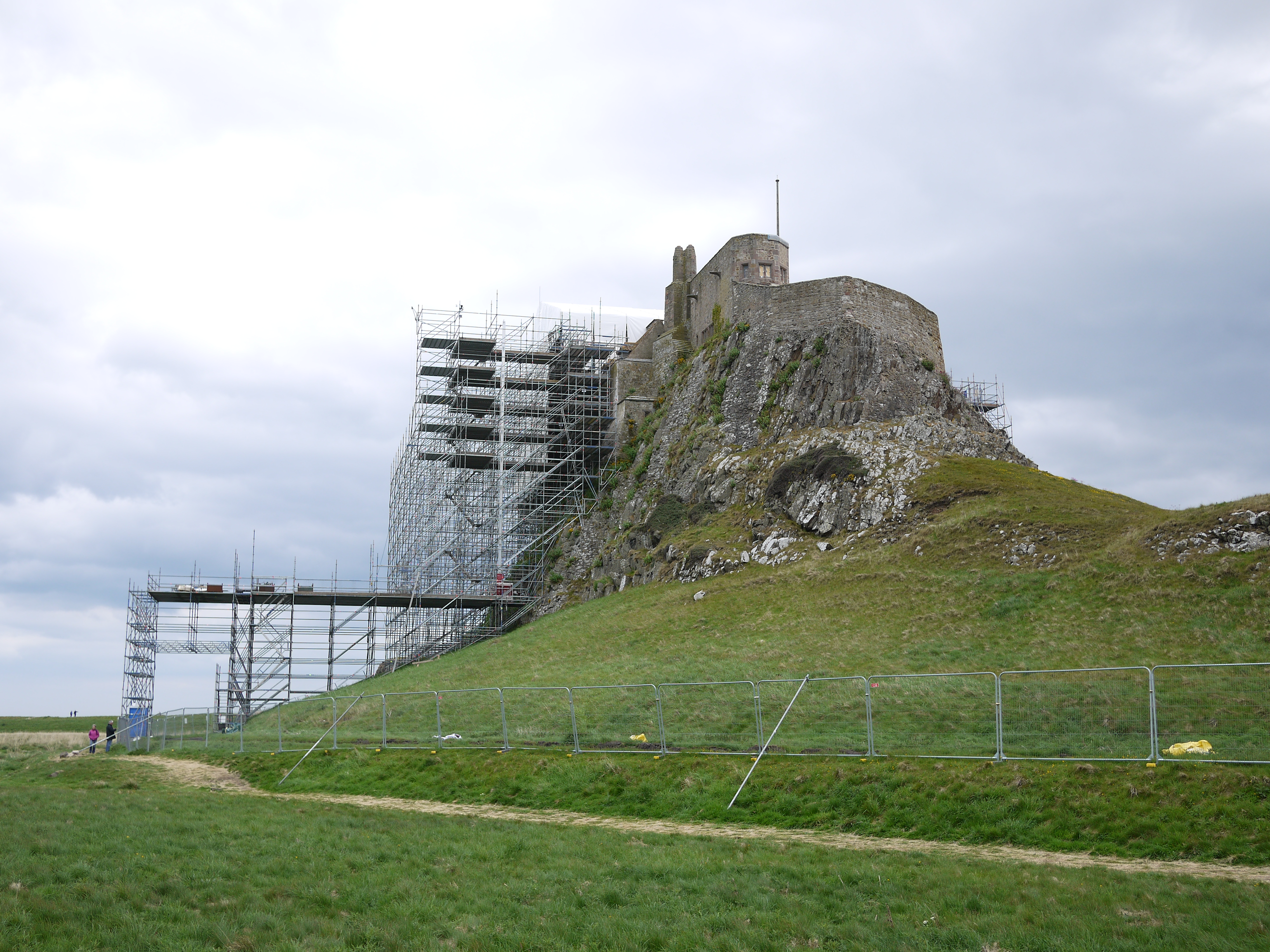
The castle during the 2016–2018 renovation

In 1901, it became the property of Edward Hudson, a publishing magnate and the owner of Country Life magazine. He had it refurbished in the Arts and Crafts style by Sir Edwin Lutyens. It is said that Hudson and the architect came across the building while touring Northumberland and climbed over the wall to explore inside.

The walled garden, which had originally been the garrison's vegetable plot, was designed by Lutyens' long-time friend and collaborator, Gertrude Jekyll between 1906 and 1912. It is some distance away from the castle itself. Between 2002 and 2006 it was restored to Jekyll's original planting plan which is now held in the Reef Collection at the University of California, Berkeley.

Hudson sold the castle to stockbroker Oswald Toynbee Falk in 1922 for £22,000 (equivalent to £1.08 million in 2025). Falk only owned it for a short time before selling it on to Edward de Stein, a merchant banker. The castle, garden and nearby lime kilns have been in the care of the National Trust since 1944 and are open to visitors.

Lutyens used upturned disused boats (herring busses) as sheds. In 2005, two of the boats were destroyed by arson. They were replaced in 2006 and the third boat has now been renovated by the National Trust. The replacement of the two burned boats by two new boat sheds features on a DVD Diary of an Island. This shows a fishing boat from Leith being cut in half in a boatyard in Eyemouth and the two "sheds" being transported to the island and lifted into place by crane.

The Spanish architect Enric Miralles used Lutyens' upturned herring busses as an inspiration for his design of the Scottish Parliament Building in Edinburgh.

The castle was closed for major renovation and restoration works from November 2016 to April 2018.

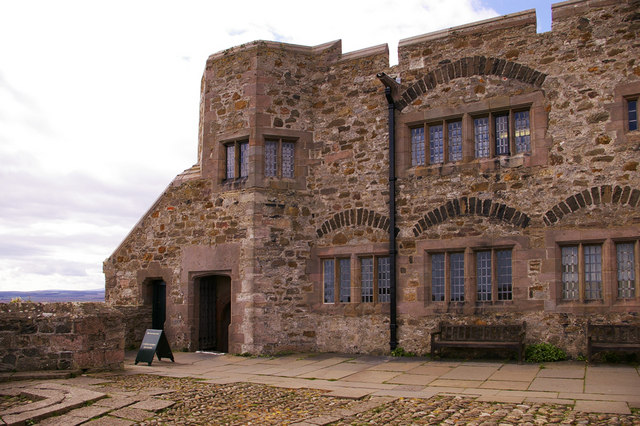
Castle entrance

The entrance to the castle is quite dramatic and involves a steep climb around the rocky base. Lutyens's original slope was unprotected by either rails or fences in an attempt to emphasise the exposed nature of the site. When the future George V and Queen Mary visited in 1908, it is said they were alarmed by the slope and the cobbled surface.

Once inside the castle, the entrance hall is sectioned off by large stone pillars, somewhat reminiscent of a church nave with the dark reddish-brown of the stone contrasting with the whitewashed plasterwork. The space is completed by a bare stone floor.

The kitchen is almost as bare, and is dominated by a large stone fireplace. Here, as at Castle Drogo, Lutyens uses the space in interesting ways. Throughout the castle, he has used stone, brick, slate and wood to create simple forms, and uses textures to demonstrate a rustic, spartan life-style. Despite being a castle it remains a homely space where the human scale is room size, but with incongruous architectural elements. In the scullery there is a tiny window over a stone sink surrounded by the mechanism used to operate the portcullis.

After descending to the dining room one is inside the remnants of the Tudor fort. The vaults here and in the adjacent ship room are entirely functional as they support the gun battery above. The wide chimney-piece contains an old bread-oven; here Lutyens has emphasised the age of the room with Neo-Gothic traceried windows framed by curtains which swing out to lie flat along the wall. One of the end walls is painted a rich Prussian blue, which contrasts with the herring-bone patterned red-brick floor.

Next door is the ship room where a green wall fulfils a similar role. The furniture is in keeping, with much dark wood in the tables and cabinets. The few upholstered chairs and sofas have now faded to gentle tones. The largest bedroom, the east, is bright and airy and again has curtains on pull-out poles. The long gallery was a new space created by Lutyens, intended to echo the grand galleries of Elizabethan and Jacobean houses. The scale is much smaller, but again the use of exposed stone arches and oak beams provides a grand yet rustic feel. Further on, an upper gallery has a raised platform at one end. From here an oak door leads onto the upper battery with its views along the coastline. The music room at the castle was used by Guilhermina Suggia, and a cello is left in the room today to mark her frequent visits.

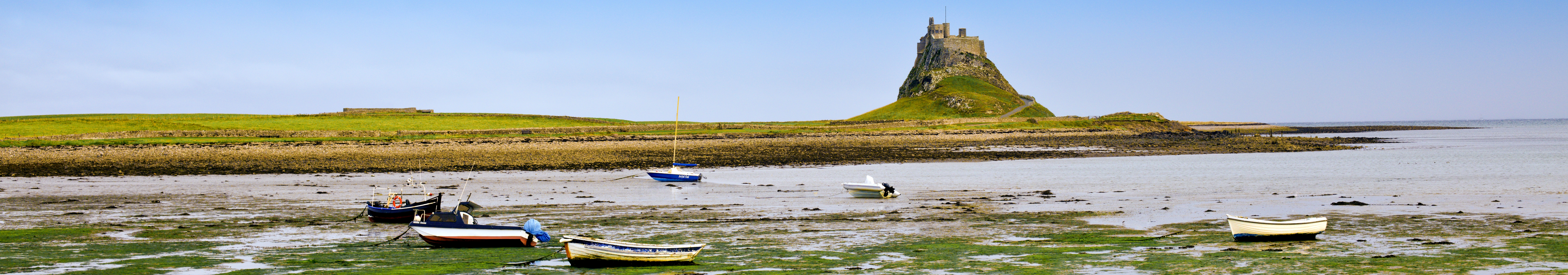
Lindisfarne Castle panorama

== Filming location ==
Lindisfarne Castle has been used as a filming location, including for The Tragedy of Macbeth (1971) and Cold Feet (1998–2003).

== See also ==
- Treasure Houses of Britain
