= Paintings in Hospitals =

British charitable organization

- Current Paintings in Hospitals logos, used since 2011
- Formation: 1959
- Founder: Sheridan Russell
- Founded at: National Hospital for Neurology and Neurosurgery
- Type: Charitable organisation
- Headquarters: Borough, London
- Region served: England and Wales, Northern Ireland
- Website: www.paintingsinhospitals.org.uk

Paintings in Hospitals is an arts in health charity in the United Kingdom. Founded in 1959, the charity's services include the provision of artwork loans, art projects and art workshops to health and social care organisations. The charity's activities are based on clinical evidence demonstrating health and wellbeing benefits of the arts to patients and care staff.

The charity owns and manages the Paintings in Hospitals collection: a loan collection of modern and contemporary art. The Paintings in Hospitals collection is the only known national art loan collection with the specific purpose of improving health and wellbeing.

Paintings in Hospitals is the healthcare partner of the Arts Council Collection. The charity was recognised by the Department of Health and Arts Council England as a key provider of arts and health services in the 2007 UK government publication "A prospectus for arts and health".

== History ==
Paintings in Hospitals was founded in 1959 by Sheridan Russell, Head Almoner at the National Hospital for Neurology and Neurosurgery. From the early 1950s, Russell had observed that the paintings of contemporary artists were far more effective than the existing reproductions in brightening up the corridors and waiting rooms of the hospital. Russell persuaded his art-world contacts to donate artworks for display in the hospital's corridors and waiting rooms. Initially, administration of the hospital art scheme was through an advisory committee of art experts, established under the leadership of Sir Dennis Proctor, a former chairman of the Tate Gallery.

Russell formalised the art loan programme in 1959 under the name Paintings in Hospitals. In 1960 it gained significant financial support from the Nuffield Foundation over a period of 15 years to establish a permanent collection of artworks for loan to other hospitals. Early acquisitions for the Paintings in Hospitals collection included paintings by John Bratby, Gillian Ayres and Mary Fedden. Within a period of ten years, the Paintings in Hospitals scheme grew to include 40 hospitals.

In 1971, when the scheme registered as a charity, a board of trustees administered the programme. Board members at that time included Sir Dennis Proctor, Lawrence Gowing, and Eric Newton, who were later joined by Roger de Grey, former President of the Royal Academy and Lord Croft.

In the 1980s, the charity began to develop a regional network of volunteer committees, enabling hospitals and other types of care sites outside of London to access the Paintings in Hospitals collection. In 1991, the charity provided seed funding and a loan of 100 paintings to establish Paintings in Hospitals Scotland. In 2005, Paintings in Hospitals Scotland became an independent Scottish charity with a name change to Art in Healthcare.

Paintings in Hospitals celebrated its 50th anniversary in 2009. The charity celebrates its 60th anniversary in 2019, with events including a collection of 60 weekly articles from notable artists, patients, and carers and a panel discussion on the future of the arts-in-health sector at the Royal College of Physicians, with speakers Edmund de Waal, Errol Francis, Val Huet, Victoria Tischler, and Ed Vaizey. Paintings in Hospitals was shortlisted for the 'Special Recognition Award' at the Charity Today Awards 2019.

== The Paintings in Hospitals collection ==
The Paintings in Hospitals collection is widely recognised as the first national collection of art specifically created to support physical and mental health. The collection holds approximately 4,000 paintings, drawings, prints, sculptures, animations and photographs from artists including Andy Warhol and Antony Gormley. Around 70% of the collection is on public display at all times. Artworks on loan from Paintings in Hospitals to health and social care organisations in the United Kingdom are seen by approximately two million patients every year.

In January 2002, The Saatchi Gallery donated 50 artworks to Paintings in Hospitals, including works by artists Simon Callery, Nicholas May, Joanna Price, Stephen Murphy, Carol Rhodes and Robert Wilson.

In 2011, Paintings in Hospitals unveiled their children's collection, designed to make healthcare sites more comfortable for children, especially teens and young adults. The artworks in the children's collection were chosen through workshops and discussions with young people from Tate Collective, the Tate's youth forum, and included artworks by Albert Irvin, John Hoyland, and Quentin Blake. Paintings in Hospitals' discussions with Tate Collective also resulted in the charity commissioning three new artworks, to be permanently added to its collection, by New York-based artist Jon Burgerman.

In 2012, Dame Stephanie Shirley donated the entirety of her art collection, including works by Andy Warhol and Elisabeth Frink, to Prior's Court School and Paintings in Hospitals.

The chair of the charity's Collection committee is trustee David Cleaton-Roberts, director at Cristea Roberts Gallery.

== Partnerships ==
Paintings in Hospitals is the healthcare partner of the Arts Council Collection. The Arts Council Collection has made 100 works of art available to Paintings in Hospitals enabling the charity to bring a new selection of work by contemporary artists into the healthcare system. In 2018, the two organisations partnered to produce the touring exhibition and symposium Rooted in the Landscape, designed to explore the relationship between art, wellbeing and the natural environment. The exhibition included artists Andy Goldsworthy, Marc Quinn, and Turner Prize-nominated Janice Kerbel.

The charity has worked with the V&A Museum over a period of 15 years to produce seven hospital exhibitions of artworks from the museum's collection. For some of the artworks, these exhibitions marked the first time they had been exhibited publicly.

In 2012, Paintings in Hospitals was gifted five posters by the London Transport Museum as part of the museum’s Access to Art initiative. In celebration of the gift, Paintings in Hospitals partnered with the museum to invite a group of carers to create an original soundscape.

In 2015, the charity collaborated with Hayward Gallery to bring art by Michael Craig-Martin to Vassall Medical Centre, London, and the National Spinal Injuries Centre, Buckinghamshire.

In 2016, Paintings in Hospitals partnered with the Wallace Collection and contemporary artist Tom Ellis to commission four large-scale paintings for GP surgeries across London. In the same year, the charity partnered with the Ingram Collection of Modern British Art to bring artworks from the collection to care homes in the South East of England.

In 2017, the charity began a three-year partnership with the Central Saint Martins art school. Students from the school's BA Culture, Criticism and Curation course explore the ways in which art might support the mental health of their peers with an annual exhibition at the Menier Gallery and at King's College London.

In 2018 the charity partnered with the Barns-Graham Trust seeking an emerging curator to develop a new touring exhibition of works by Wilhelmina Barns-Graham. The resulting exhibition, Linear Meditations, was shortlisted for 'Art Installation of the Year' at the Design in Mental Health Awards 2019.

In 2019, Paintings in Hospitals partnered with the National Gallery to place Self-Portrait as Saint Catherine of Alexandria by the Italian Baroque painter Artemisia Gentileschi on display at Pocklington Group Practice, a GP surgery in East Yorkshire.

In 2020, Paintings in Hospitals partnered with Google Arts & Culture to bring part of their art collection onto the online platform and to collaborate with the artist Thomas Croft on the virtual exhibition Healthcare Heroes, which featured over 700 artworks from the Portraits for NHS Heroes initiative.
