= Winterfold House =

Building in Surrey, England

Coordinates: 51.1666°N 0.4664°W

Winterfold House, between Cranleigh and Peaslake, is one of the few private country properties to be designed by London architect Edward Blakeway I'Anson, F.R.I.B.A., M.A. Cantab of St Laurence Pountney Hill, E.C. He was the elder son of Edward I'Anson JP, born in London and educated at Cheltenham College and Cambridge University. He followed his father's profession and was architect and surveyor to St Bartholomew's Hospital in London. The Architect’s practice continued by him was one of the oldest established in the country, and many of the finest buildings in the City of London including the new Corn Exchange in Mark Lane, London are of his design. He was Master of the Worshipful Company of Merchant Taylors in 1908. In partnership with his father Edward I'Anson they had earlier made a successful major refurbishment to Fetcham Park House Surrey.

== Location and estate ==
The estate covers around 212 acres, situated in the Surrey hills, close to the village of Cranleigh north east along Barhatch Lane. Rising to about 700 ft. above the sea in Winterfold Hill, part of the great stretch of the heath and fir upland called Hurt Wood adjoining Blackheath to the north, and eastward rising still higher in Ewhurst, Holmbury, and Leith Hills, in Ewhurst, Ockley, and Wotton respectively. Holmbury Hill and Pitch Hill, known collectively as The Hurtwood, are known for their abundant bilberries. These blueberry like fruits are known locally as 'Hurts' hence the name of the woods.

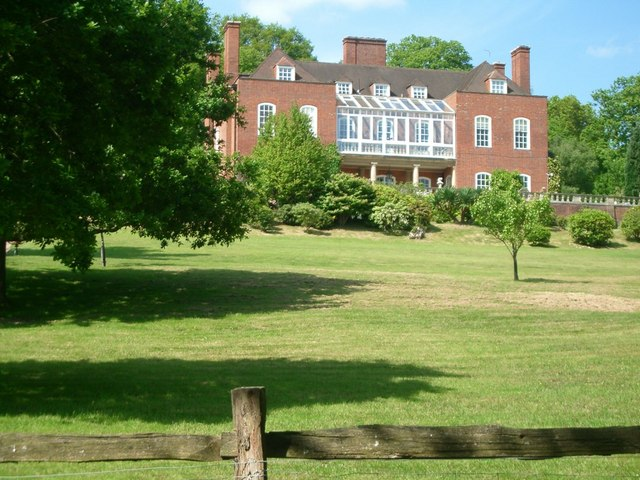
Winterfold House from bridleway 358 (June 2006) - geograph.org.uk - 182577

== Estate owners ==
Sir Richard Webster QC, afterwards Viscount Alverstone (1886-1915)
The house was built in 1886 designed by London architect Edward Blakeway I'Anson (1843-1912), in a classic late Victorian style, for Richard Webster QC later Viscount Alverstone who laid out grounds with flowering trees and shrubs. Lord Alverstone married Louisa Mary, daughter of William Charles Calthrop, in 1872. They had one son and one daughter. She died in March 1877. Their only son, the Honourable Arthur died childless in August 1902, aged 28, after an operation for appendicitis. In 1891 a series of professional photographs were taken of the interior rooms and exterior aspect and grounds of the house. They are now part of the English Heritage Archive. In 1900 he was appointed Lord Chief Justice and became Lord Alverstone in 1913. He died at Cranleigh, Surrey, in December 1915, aged 72. He was buried at West Norwood Cemetery. He was President of Surrey County Cricket Club from 1895 until his death. His peerages became extinct on his death. The woodland above the house is known as 'Lord Justice Seat'.

Charles & Celine Armytage-Moore (1923-1962)
Charles Armytage-Moore came from a background of Irish aristocracy. Educated at Repton School, he was a founder partner in the stockbrokers Buckmaster and Moore, (taken over by Credit Suisse in 1987). He was a member of the Marylebone Cricket Club, and married Celine Pappa in 1917. A few weeks later, her youngest brother Second Lieutenant Armaud Pappa was killed at Arras. Celine, the eldest daughter of a London-based Greek stockbroker Demosthenes George Pappa and French-born wife, Franceska Jacobi, born in Paris. They honeymooned by travelling the world and returned to purchase the estate in 1923. Charles acquired additional land in 1925 and continued the garden development started by Richard Webster. He reconstructed the main facade in Queen Anne style. He enhanced the gardens with rare rhododendrons, camellias, azaleas and magnolias. One particular red-flowered species (Rhododendron barbatum Wallich ex G. Don 1834) won an Award of Merit when exhibited by Winterfold House in 1934. Celine became a member of the Surrey Archaeological Society in 1927. Charles became an invalid and died in 1960. They had no children, so the property together with their fantastic collection of furniture and art was auctioned off. His wife Celine died in Haslemere in 1970.

Prince Carol of Romania (1964-1978)
In 1964 Prince Carol of Romania bought Winterfold House for an estimated £100,000. He later sold Winterfold and moved to London where he died in 2006.

== Winterfold at war (1943-45) ==
During World War II Winterfold was requisitioned by the British Government and used by SOE Special Operations Executive, as a training school designated STS 4 and later STS 7 as the location of the Student Assessment Board. The initial training establishment STS5 at Wanborough Manor near Guildford, had been established in February 1941 and this continued until March 1943 when a new selection procedures were established at Winterfold House, near Cranleigh. Its primary use during the war was to whittle out those not suited to undercover work and begin initial training for those that progressed. Prospecting for good agent material was the job of SOE's newly appointed SAB established in June 1943 by a small team of psychologists, psychiatrists and military staff. Amongst the many recruits that attended Winterfold included Muriel Byck, Andrée Borrel, Denise Bloch, Noor Inyat Khan (Nora Baker) – a descendant of Indian Muslim royalty and Violette Szabo GC. The film Carve Her Name with Pride was made in 1958 about Szabo's wartime life in the SOE. Her much quoted code-poem produced by codemaker Leo Marks at Special Operations Executive, was recited at the end of the film "The life that I have / Is all that I have / And the life that I have / Is yours. (part)

SOE memorial In November 2011, a Memorial to the SOE was unveiled at Winterfold House, Surrey, formerly STS 7, Students' Assessment Board. It was initiated by British military historian, writer and author Paul McCue and others. It was attended by Tania Szabó, the daughter of heroine Violette Szabo, together with representatives from the USA, Dutch and French embassies and from the Canadian High Commission.

== Winterfold and The Great Train Robbery (1963) ==
In August 1963, thieves ambushed the Glasgow to Euston mail train in Buckinghamshire and stole over £2m in used, untraceable banknotes in the largest-ever raid on a British train. It became known as The Great Train Robbery. At one stage during the hunt for the thieves, suspicion fell on Winterfold House above Cranleigh where a police raid took place searching for some of the train robbers, but nothing was found. Later in the same vicinity some of the proceeds were discovered: £100,900 in a bag in Redlands Wood, a beauty spot two miles from Dorking, and a further £30,435 in a caravan on Box Hill Surrey.

== Winterfold estate sold (1978) ==
The sale catalogue records details of Winterfold Estate, comprising 212 acres for sale by auction. It was broken-up into 18 lots with vacant possession, 17 May 1978.
Joint auctioneers Weller Eggar, 4 Quarry Street, Guildford and John D Wood & Co, 23 Berkeley Square, London. Solicitors, Clayton & Co, 22 Rothsay Road, Luton, Bedfordshire. The house was divided into two lots and the remaining estate, Winderfold Lodge, The Coach House, The Gardeners Cottage, The Bothy cottage, Winterfold Farm, Colmans Farmhouse, Keepers Cottage, pasture and woodland into separate lots.

Lot 1: Winterfold House, built c.1925 in the Queen Anne style. Modern addition to the earlier 19th century house (Winterfold Court) with which it was integrated to provide a much larger house. The auctioneers state that the two structures can be easily separated with the minimum of structural alteration. Winterfold House stands in its own grounds of 4½ acres, when converted it will provide the following accommodation: entrance lobby and cloakroom, hall with pipe organ, 3 interconnecting reception rooms, kitchen, 7 bedrooms, 3 of which are en suite and bathroom.
Lot 2: Winterfold Court is a 19th-century residence which stands on its own grounds of 4¾ acres. Planning consent for its separation from Winterfold House has been obtained and the Architects Floor Plans are included in the back cover of the catalogue (1716/5). Total accommodation provided is as follows: entrance hall and staircase, 2 cloakrooms, 3 reception rooms and fine panelled billiards room with vaulted ceiling, large kitchen, utility room, play room, stores. Wine cellar and boiler room, 2 bedrooms and bathroom suites, 2 further bedrooms and 4 bedrooms and bathroom and box room on the second floor.

== Winterfold House today ==
The house is currently owned by businessman Major Anthony Hampton and his family.

== Books & sources ==
Winterfold at War:

- BINNEY, Marcus, The Women who lived for Danger, The women Agents of SOE in the Second World Wat, Hodder & Stoughton, 2002, pages 203,222, ISBN 0 340 81839 5
- MARKS, Leo, Between Silk and Cyanide -A codemaker's War 1939-1945 HarperCollins (paperback) London 2000, ISBN 0 00 710039 6
- MINNEY, R J, Carve Her Name with Pride, The story of Violette Szabo, 1964, The Children's Book Club, London
- O'CONNOR, Bernard, Return to Belgium, The true story of four women agents sent to liberate Belgium during World War Two, 2009, pages 42–44, ISBN 978-1-902810-35-5
- OTTAWAY, Susan, Violette Szabo: The Life That I Have, 2002, Pen & Sword Publishing, Thistle publishing, 2014 ISBN 978 1 910198421
- List of SOE Establishments WW2 List of SOE establishments
- Cranleigh's School for Secret Agents, Cranleigh Magazine, January 2019,
- Exploring Surrey's Past: Winterfold House gardens, Cranleigh
- The Open University: Int. Centre for the History of Crime, Policing and Justice, Part 3 1951-1975: Great Train Robbery 1963
- Notable people who live or have lived in the local area: Eric Clapton (winterfold estate), Jim Davidson (winterfold estate), Ringo Starr (Cranleigh)
- The Rhododendron Species Foundation & Botanical Garden:
- Surrey Archaeological Society:
- BM&D and Census records
- Historic England: Winterfold House Listed Building

== Links ==
Violette Szabo GC, SOE Edward Blakeway I'Anson, architect: https://www.tracesofwar.com/sights/108802/SOE-Establishment---STS-4-7-Winterfold-House.htm https://www.secret-ww2.net/
