= Leigh Hubbard =

Leigh Hubbard was secretary of the Victorian Trades Hall Council for 10 years from 1995 to 2005, one of the most powerful trade union positions in Australia. During his time as Secretary he played a pivotal role in union battles with the Kennett government, the campaign to restore common law rights for injured workers, the 1998 Australian waterfront dispute, the battles over award rights for Victorians who had been "left in the lurch" with the transfer of Industrial Relations powers to the Commonwealth in 1996, the East Timor campaigns in 1999 in which he urged that troops be sent there, and the James Hardie campaign for compensation for victims of asbestos diseases.

Leigh Hubbard has a BA and LLB from the University of Melbourne and has worked as a solicitor, an industrial officer, policy officer, and Secretary of the Victorian Trades Hall Council. He joined the Labor Party in 1980. After resigning as Secretary of the VTHC in 2005 he became the National Executive Officer of the United Firefighters Union of Australia. He also has served as a member of the Australian Council of Trade Unions Executive and the Ethical Clothing Trades Council.

From 2000 until March 2005 Hubbard was a member of the Victorian State Training Board. He also has experience on the board of the Victorian Qualifications Authority, the Manufacturing Industry Consultative Council and the Victorian Work Authority WorkCover Advisory Committee.

In 2007 he became the Executive Officer of the Asbestos Diseases Society of Victoria (ADSVIC).
