= Alex Millmow =

Australian historian

- Awards: 2005 HETSA Award for Best PhD Dissertation

Academic background
- Education: Australian National University
- Thesis: The power of economic ideas : the origins of macroeconomic management in interwar Australia : 1929-1939 (2004)
- Doctoral advisor: Selwyn Cornish
- Influences: John Maynard Keynes; Joan Robinson; Colin Clark

Academic work
- School or tradition: Keynesian economics
- Institutions: Federation University Australia; Australian National University; Department of the Treasury
- Doctoral students: C. J. Coventry
- Main interests: Economic history
- Notable works: The Power of Economic Ideas (2010)

Alexander John Millmow is an Australian economic historian, journalist, and author. Formerly an associate professor at Federation University Australia, he is an honorary research fellow at Australian National University and a adjunct associate professor at Federation, and is president of the History of Economic Thought Society of Australia.

Millmow was an early advocate of increasing economics education in schools because of the decline in practical economic literacy in Australia. He also believes politicians in the 1970s and 1980s acted more boldly than politicians of the 2020s. He has cautioned the Albanese Government that its plans to make the Reserve Bank of Australia completely independent are undermining Australian Labor Party history.

== Books ==
Millmow is the author of books including:

- The Power of Economic Ideas: The Origins of Keynesian Macroeconomic Management in Interwar Australia 1929–39 (Australian National University E Press, 2010)
- A History of Australasian Economic Thought (Routledge, 2017)
- The Gypsy Economist: The Life and Times of Colin Clark (Palgrave Macmillan, 2021)

He is co-editor of Reclaiming Pluralism in Economics (Routledge, 2016, with Jerry Courvisanos and James Doughney).
