= Victorian Trades Hall =

Headquarters of the Victorian Trades Hall Council, Australia

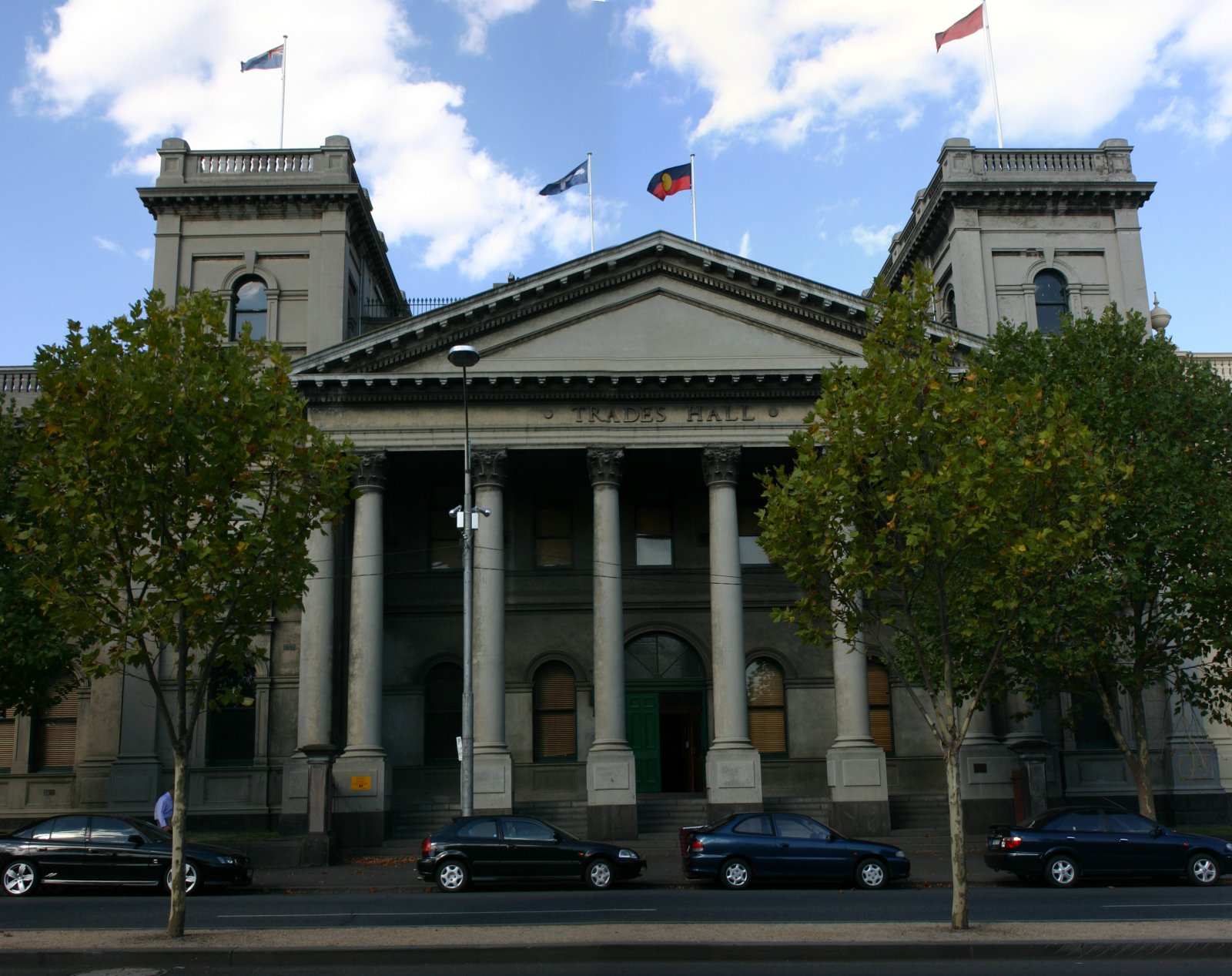
- Victorian Trades Hall entrance on Lygon Street

- Location of the trades hall in Greater Metropolitan Melbourne
- Alternative names: Melbourne Trades Hall

General information
- Status: Completed
- Type: Trades hall
- Architectural style: Victorian Academic Classical
- Location: 54 Victoria Street, Carlton, Melbourne central business district, Victoria, Australia
- Coordinates: 37°48′23″S 144°57′59″E
- Completed: 1859; 167 years ago
- Renovated: 1960s
- Owner: Victorian Trades Hall Council

Technical details
- Material: Bluestone; cement-rendered bricks

Website
- weareunion.org.au
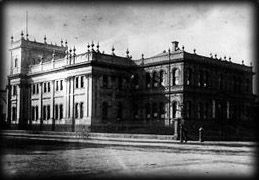
- Trades Hall around the turn of the 20th century

Australian National Heritage List
- Official name: Victorian Trades Hall
- Type: Historic
- Criteria: a, d
- Designated: 11 August 2023
- Reference no.: 106370

Victorian Heritage Register
- Official name: Victorian Trades Hall
- Type: Registered place
- Designated: 26 August 1981
- Reference no.: VHR H0663
- Heritage overlay no.: HO68

The Victorian Trades Hall is a trades hall that serves as the headquarters of the Victorian Trades Hall Council in Australia. It is located on the corner of Lygon and Victoria streets, just north of the Melbourne central business district in the suburb of Carlton. Completed in 1859, it is one of the oldest trade union buildings in the world.

Built on the traditional lands of the Wurundjeri people, the trades hall was added to the Australian National Heritage List on 11 August 2023; and was earlier added to the Victorian Heritage Register on 26 August 1981 in recognition of its historical, social, and architectural significance; and was also added to a non-statutory list by the Victorian branch of the National Trust on 13 November 1980.

== History ==
In 1856 the Melbourne Trades Hall Committee was formed and received a grant of land from premier John O'Shanassy to build the Melbourne Trades Hall. The original Trades Hall was opened in May 1859, built by workers as an organising place for the labour movement in Melbourne, and as a medium to educate workers and their families. The workers financed the construction of the building themselves. It was built in the style of the parliament buildings which were just down the road, and over the years has been further developed. The original building was made of timber with galvanised iron roofing.

Between 1874 and 1925, the trades hall was rebuilt and upgraded by Reed & Barnes, the architectural practice responsible for some other 19th-century Melbourne landmarks including the Melbourne Town Hall and the State Library of Victoria. With increasing activity during the 1880s in the Australian labour movement, the committee became a Council to reflect its expanding role, though the full title, Victorian Trades Hall Council was only formally adopted in 1968.

== Description ==
The Trades Hall is located across the road from the eight-hour day monument which was erected to honour the Victorian workers who won the first eight-hour working day in the world in 1856. It is the birthplace of organisations like the Victorian Labor Party and the Australian Council of Trade Unions. Four flags fly from the roof of the building: the Australian Flag, the Eureka Flag, the Australian Aboriginal flag, and the red flag.

Trades Hall is home to a number of Victorian trade unions, community organisations and left-wing political parties, such as the Communication Workers Union of Australia and the Communist Party of Australia. Until 2017, the building was the headquarters of the National Union of Students. The Hall is primarily used by Victorian labour organisations as a space for organising and coordinating campaigns. The Hall also hosts occupational health and safety training for workers. The various rooms of the Hall can also be hired out for functions, meetings or conferences and it is often used for theatrical productions and to display artwork. The Hall has a bar which is patronised by trade union members and political activists and a bookshop which sells political texts. In 1931, the hall was used as a broadcast venue for 3KZ, the predecessor station to Gold 104.3.

In recent times, as well as serving as the headquarters of various trade unions and being the centre for political and union activities, the Trades Hall Council has opened the Trades Hall building to many cultural events such as theatre productions, art exhibitions, plays, and concerts including the Melbourne Comedy Festival–concentrating on political and 'on the edge' performances. Trades Hall became the hub of the Melbourne Fringe Festival in 2019, with Melbourne Fringe also establishing a year-round program at Trades Hall.

The Victorian Trades Hall Council continues to engage in campaigning and research activities and, in 2023, released a report entitled Every Worker in Australia: A Race Class Narrative.

== See also ==
- Architecture of Melbourne
- List of places on the Victorian Heritage Register in the City of Melbourne
