= Edward Hudson (magazine owner) =

British magazine publisher (1854–1936)

Edward Burgess Hudson (1854–1936) was the founder of Country Life magazine in 1897.

== Early life ==
Edward Hudson was born in November 1854 in London into a prosperous middle-class family. His father, John Francis Daniel Hudson, was head of the family business of Hudson & Kearns Ltd. He was raised in a large family in a mansion near Hyde Park where he continued to live, with his invalid brother Henry and two unmarried sisters, long after the death of his parents.

Hudson did not attend either public school or university and was articled to a solicitor when he was just 15. Although he rose quickly through the ranks, becoming a chief conveyancing clerk, he disliked the profession. After a brief spell as a ‘printer’s traveller’ he took over the family's printing business at the age of 21.

== Career and the birth of Country Life ==
Edward Hudson turned out to be an astute businessman, embracing advances in the printing world which led to the growth of the company into publishing.

Hudson was introduced to important figures in the publishing world and after he met the chairman of the News of the World, Lord Riddell and Sir George Newnes, a publisher who had made his fortune through the widely read magazine Tit-Bits, Hudson started producing his first magazines in partnership with the firm of George Newnes Ltd. On 8 January 1897, Country Life Illustrated, subtitled ‘A journal for all interested in country life and country pursuits, with which is incorporated Racing Illustrated’ was introduced to the British public. Out of the failing readership for Racing Illustrated emerged a glossy new magazine that was popular from the outset and was to evolve in 1903 into the early lifestyle magazine Country Life; Edward Hudson's magnum opus and a project he oversaw for the rest of life.

The magazine's success led to Hudson and Newnes commissioning the architect Edwin Lutyens, who had already worked for Hudson privately, to design suitable offices for the magazine in Tavistock Street, Covent Garden. It was Lutyens’ first commission for a monumental design in London. By 1905, Hudson had bought out Newnes and established Country Life Ltd.

Still being sold today, Country Life has employed some notable people on its staff and as contributors over the years. In the decade after the foundation of the magazine, Hudson gathered the team that would shape its future. Firstly, architectural and garden photographers, like Charles Latham, and writers including Gertrude Jekyll on gardening and, of course, Edwin Lutyens who wrote on architecture, including an article ‘What I think of Modern Architecture’ in 1931. Others, to name a few, are the poet John Betjeman, Auberon Waugh, Simon Jenkins, and Roy Strong.

== Hudson & Kearns Ltd ==
The company was established in 1831 by Edward Hudson's grandfather, a well to do merchant who had moved from Cumberland to London. From 1905 the printing works ran from premises at Hatfield Street Works, Stamford Street in Southwark having moved from 83-7 Southwark Street.

In about 1890 Edward Hudson introduced new technology and expanded the company. New machines invented in Germany in the 1880s made the printing of mass-market periodicals illustrated with photographs a commercial reality for the first time. The company went from printing books for other publishers to becoming publishers and producing their own magazines and, as soon as Country Life was a success, Hudson imported the latest presses from America.

The company diversified and, as well as magazines, they printed picture postcards such as those by F.G.O. Stuart during what is known as the ‘golden age of postcards’, programmes for the 1908 Olympic Games in London and, as they became more well-known and described as ‘the London photographic reproductive specialists’, were used for a variety of work such as printing photographs of paintings by C.R.W. Nevinson.

Work by Hudson & Kearns is now held by numerous museums and galleries from 29 photogravure portraits published by the company in the National Portrait Gallery, London to a Mappin & Webb Ltd catalogue printed by them and held by the Metropolitan Museum, New York. Photographs bearing the attribution label ‘Hudson & Kearns’ are also held in the Conway Library at the Courtauld Institute of Art and are currently being digitised as part of the wider Courtauld Connects project.

In the first half of the 20th century, the company merged with J. J. Keliher & Company and a new company Keliher, Hudson & Kearns Ltd was formed.

== Personal life ==
In middle life, Hudson moved to 15 Queen Anne's Gate and surrounded himself, not only with beautiful furniture and art, of which he was a lifetime collector, but also with friends, contributors to Country Life, and other notables of the time at his regular Monday soirees.

Having been introduced to Edwin Lutyens by Gertrude Jekyll they became firm friends with Hudson treating Lutyens like a son. He travelled to India for the inauguration of New Delhi with Lutyens in 1931 and was godfather to his daughter Ursula. Lutyens was responsible for helping Hudson with the refurbishment of Lindisfarne Castle, Holy Island, of which Hudson had become the owner in 1901, in the Arts and Crafts style with the walled garden designed by Jekyll.

Hudson was the owner of two other Lutyens-designed houses, Deanery Garden in Sonning (c.1899-1907), designed and built 1899–1901, and Plumpton Place, Sussex (1927-36 but not occupied); the properties were featured in Country Life in 1903 and 1933 respectively. Both houses have been owned by Led Zeppelin guitarist Jimmy Page, who also owns The Tower House in London.

Edward Hudson remained single until he was in his 70s when he married Ellen Gertrude Woolrich (b.1876/7) on 2 May 1929. Woolrich was the editor of the Magazine Homes and Gardens, one of Hudson's publications, and they remained married until his death at his London home on 17 September 1936.
