= List of former state routes in New York (301–400) =

This section of the list of former state routes in New York contains all routes numbered between 301 and 400.

Route	Southern or western terminus	Northern or eastern terminus	Formed	Removed
NY 305 (1930-early 1940s)	New Jersey state line at Chestnut Ridge	US 202 in Haverstraw	1930	early 1940s
NY 307	NY 32 in Cornwall	NY 218 in Cornwall	1930s	1980
NY 310 (1930s-1960s)	NY 85A in Voorheesville	US 20 in Guilderland	1930s	mid-1960s
NY 312 (1930–1937) (1930-1937)	NY 52 in Patterson	NY 22 in Patterson	1930	ca. 1937
NY 314 (1930-1950s)	NY 7 in Schenevus	Westford	1930	mid-1950s
NY 317 (1930-early 1940s)	NY 28 in Newport	Norway	1930	early 1940s
NY 317 (early 1940s-1980)	NY 7 in Troy	NY 142 in Brunswick	early 1940s	1980
NY 318 (1931-1950s)	NY 12D in Leyden	NY 12 in Port Leyden	ca. 1931	late 1950s
NY 319	Chenango CR 4 / CR 10 / CR 19 in Preston	NY 12 in Norwich	1930	1984
NY 323	NY 249 in Brant	NY 5 in Evans	1930	1980
NY 324 (1932-1933)	East Eden	US 62 in Hamburg	ca. 1932	ca. 1933
NY 325 (1932-1933)	NY 96 in Ithaca	Taughannock Falls State Park in Ulysses	ca. 1932	ca. 1933
NY 328A	PA 549 at the Pennsylvania state line at Southport	NY 328 in Southport	1930	ca. 1935
NY 330	76 Road in Caroline	NY 79 in Dryden	ca. 1931	1980
NY 333	Steuben CR 11 / CR 24 in Thurston	NY 415 in Campbell	1930	1997
NY 337 (1930-1933)	NY 41 in Spafford	NY 174 in Marcellus	1930	ca. 1933
NY 337 (1935-1972)	NY 12D / NY 26 in West Turin	NY 12 in Lyons Falls	ca. 1935	ca. 1972
NY 338 (1930s)	NY 248 in Whitesville	Pennsylvania state line	ca. 1931	ca. 1939
NY 338 (1940s-1980)	NY 29 in Northumberland	US 4 / NY 32 in Schuylerville	1940s	1980
NY 338 (1980-1996)	NY 40 in Argyle	NY 29 in Greenwich	1980	1996
NY 339 (1932-1937)	NY 17 in Ramapo	US 202 in Suffern	ca. 1932	ca. 1937
NY 339	NY 50 in Ballston	NY 146A in Ballston	by 1946	early 1970s
NY 341 (early 1930s-1934)	NY 22 in Dover	CT 55 at the Connecticut state line at Dover	early 1930s	ca. 1934
NY 341	NY 22 / NY 55 in Pawling	Connecticut state line at Pawling	ca. 1934	1940s
NY 342 (1930-1940s)	NY 23 in Gilboa	Schoharie CR 18 in Conesville	1930	late 1940s
NY 347 (1930-1934)	NY 22 in Crown Point	VT 17 at the Vermont state line at Crown Point	1930	ca. 1934
NY 347 (1934-1952)	NY 22 in Ticonderoga	Ferry landing in Ticonderoga	ca. 1934	1952
NY 348	NY 22 in Chazy	US 9 in Chazy	1930	1980
NY 351 (1931-1970s)	NY 436 in Portage	NY 408 in Nunda	ca. 1931	mid-1970s
NY 352 (1931-1938)	NY 25A in Riverhead	Wildwood State Park west entrance	ca. 1931	ca. 1938
NY 355 (1930-1937)	NY 33 in Cheektowaga	NY 5 in Williamsville	1930	ca. 1937
NY 356	NY 265 in City of Tonawanda	NY 270 in Amherst	1930	1988
NY 357 (1933-1940s)	Letchworth State Park	NY 39 in Castile	ca. 1933	early 1940s
NY 358	US 20A in Wales	US 20 in Alden	1930	1982
NY 359 (1930-early 1940s)	NY 77 in Royalton	US 104 in Hartland	1930	early 1940s
NY 360	NY 272 in Hamlin	NY 19 in Hamlin	ca. 1931	2012
NY 361 (1931-1935)	Blaine	NY 5S in Canajoharie	ca. 1931	1935
NY 361	CT 361 at the Connecticut state line at North East	US 44 in Millerton	1935	1980
NY 363 (1930-1931)	Blaine	NY 5S in Canajoharie	1930	ca. 1931
NY 363 (1932-1950s)	NY 15A in Mendon	NY 65 in Honeoye Falls	ca. 1932	late 1950s
NY 365 (1930-early 1930s)	NY 17 in Big Flats	Chambers Road / Cowan Road in Catlin	1930	by 1932
NY 368	NY 321 in Elbridge	NY 5 in Elbridge	1930s	1980
NY 376 (1930-1933)	NY 32 in Esopus	NY 213 in Rosendale	1930	1933
NY 379	NY 14 in Southport	NY 427 in Southport	ca. 1931	1978
NY 380	NY 60 in Gerry	NY 5 near Brocton	1930	1980
NY 381	NY 43 in Rensselaer	US 4 in East Greenbush	ca. 1938	late 1960s
NY 382	NY 17 in Red House	Allegany State Park west boundary in Red House	ca. 1932	early 1970s
NY 383 (1930-1935)	NY 93 in Akron	NY 5 in Akron	1930	ca. 1935
NY 383 (1935-early 1940s)	NY 26 / NY 79 in Whitney Point	NY 12 / NY 41 in Greene	ca. 1935	early 1940s
NY 383B	NY 47 / NY 383 in Rochester	NY 383 in Penfield	early 1940s	late 1940s
NY 385 (1930-1932)	NY 31 in Murray	NY 18 in Kendall	1930	ca. 1932
NY 388	NY 33 in West Walworth	NY 35 in West Walworth	ca. 1931	early 1940s
NY 389	NY 14A / NY 245 southwest of Geneva	US 20 / NY 5 west of Geneva	ca. 1931	early 1940s
NY 390 (1930-1960s)	US 20 / NY 5 / NY 414 in Seneca Falls	NY 318 in Tyre	1930	mid-1960s
NY 390A	US 20 / NY 5 in Seneca Falls	NY 89 on Tyre – Seneca Falls town line	1930s	late 1950s
NY 392 (1936-1970s)	NY 79 in Ithaca	NY 366 in Dryden	ca. 1936	mid-1970s
NY 393	NY 13 in Ithaca	Game Farm Road on Ithaca–Dryden town line	ca. 1933	mid-1960s
NY 394 (1930–1935) (1930-1935)	NY 361 in Canajoharie	NY 162 in Root	1930	ca. 1935
NY 394 (1936–1967) (1936-1967)	NY 137 in Pound Ridge	CT 29 at the Connecticut state line at Pound Ridge	ca. 1935	1967
NY 398	NY 9J in Stuyvesant	US 9 in Stuyvesant	ca. 1932	1980
NY 399	NY 29 in Johnstown	NY 29A in Johnstown	1935	by 1961
NY 400	US 9 in Stockport	Stockport	1930s	by 1935
NY 400	NY 9H in Kinderhook	NY 203 in Valatie	by 1935	early 1950s
