= New York State Route 152 =

Former state highway in New York State

New York State Route 152
- Best Road
- NY 152 highlighted in red

Route information
- Maintained by NYSDOT
- Length: 6.0 mi (9.7 km)
- Existed: 1930–April 14, 1980

Major junctions
- West end: US 4 / NY 43 in North Greenbush
- East end: NY 150 in Sand Lake

Location
- Country: United States
- State: New York
- Counties: Rensselaer

Highway system
- New York Highways; Interstate; US; State; Reference; Parkways
← NY 151	→ NY 153

New York State Route 152 (NY 152) was a 6.0-mile-long (9.7 km) east–west state highway in Rensselaer County, New York, in the United States. The western terminus of the route was at an intersection with U.S. Route 4 (US 4) and NY 43 in the town of North Greenbush. Its eastern terminus was at a junction with NY 150 in the town of Sand Lake. NY 152 was little more than a connector between the hamlets of Defreestville and Sliters.

NY 152 originally extended westward into the city of Rensselaer when it was assigned as part of the 1930 renumbering of state highways in New York, but was truncated to Defreestville c. 1937. Ownership and maintenance of NY 152 was transferred from the state of New York to Rensselaer County on April 1, 1980, and the NY 152 designation was officially removed from the highway two weeks later on April 14. The former routing of NY 152 is now part of County Route 55 (CR 55).

== Route description ==
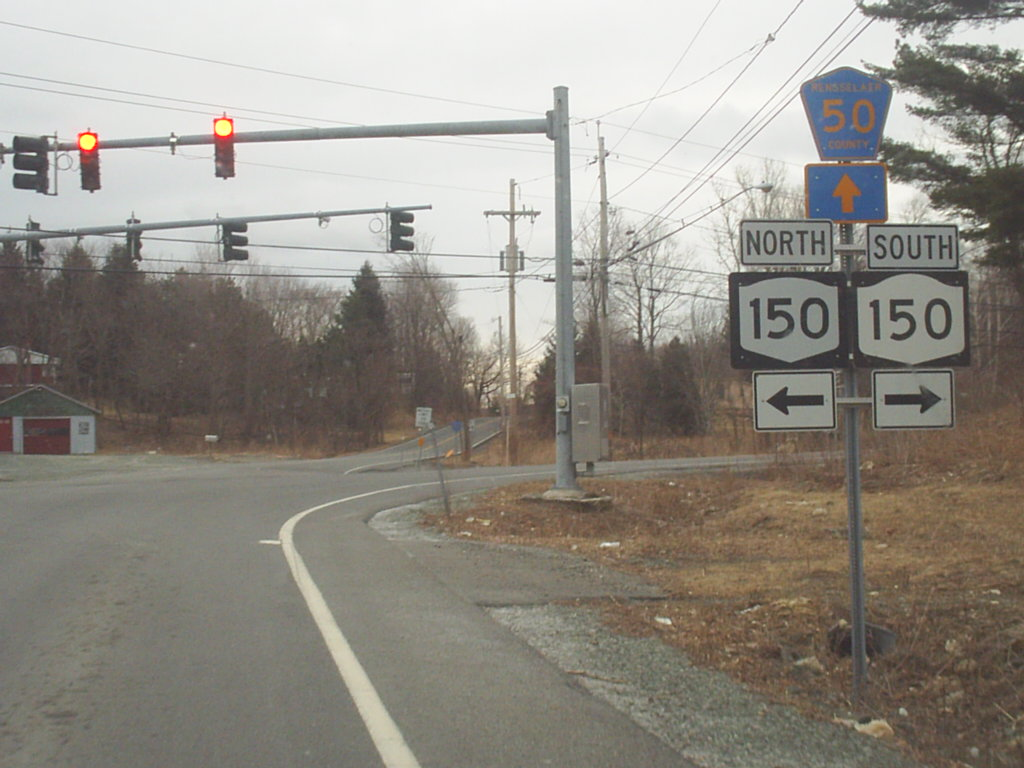
CR 55 at NY 150 in Sliters, where NY 152 formerly terminated

NY 152 began at an intersection with US 4 and NY 43 in the hamlet of Defreestville within the town of North Greenbush. It headed east out of the community in a general southeast direction, traveling through suburban and rural areas and into the town of East Greenbush. In the hamlet of Best, NY 152 intersected CR 53, a north–south highway connecting NY 151 to NY 43. Just east of Best, NY 152 crossed into the town of Sand Lake, where it ended at an intersection with NY 150. East of the junction, Best Road became Millers Corners Road and continued on as CR 50.

== History ==
NY 152 was assigned as part of the 1930 renumbering of state highways in New York. It began at the intersection of Broadway and 2nd Avenue in the city of Rensselaer and followed 2nd Avenue, East Street, and 3rd Avenue eastward to US 4 in East Greenbush. By 1932, NY 152 was extended eastward to NY 150 in the hamlet of Sliters by way of the community of Defreestville. From East Greenbush to Defreestville, NY 152 overlapped US 4. NY 152 was truncated on its western end c. 1937 to begin at its junction with US 4 in Defreestville. Its former routing in Rensselaer was redesignated as NY 381 by the following year. On April 1, 1980, ownership and maintenance of NY 152 was transferred from the state of New York to Rensselaer County as part of a highway maintenance swap between the two levels of government. The NY 152 designation was removed two weeks later on April 14.

NY 152's former routing is now part of CR 55, a designation that also encompasses the portion of Washington Avenue between the Rensselaer city line and Defreestville. Ownership and maintenance of this section of Washington Avenue, which was formerly part of NY 43, was also transferred from the state to Rensselaer County as part of the April 1980 maintenance swap. Originally, Best Road and Washington Avenue met US 4 and NY 43 at the same intersection. However, the junction has since been reconfigured so that Washington Avenue ends at nearby Blooming Grove Drive and Best Road begins at NY 43. As a result, CR 55 was split into two discontinuous segments.

== Major intersections ==
The entire route was in Rensselaer County.

Location	mi	km	Destinations	Notes
Defreestville	0.0	0.0	NY 43 (West Sand Lake Road) to US 4	
Sliters	6.0	9.7	NY 150 (West Sand Lake Road) / CR 50 east (Millers Corners Road)	Western terminus of CR 50
1.000 mi = 1.609 km; 1.000 km = 0.621 mi

== See also ==
- List of county routes in Rensselaer County, New York
