= Snyder's Lake, New York =

- hamlet

- Location within the state of New York
- Coordinates: 42°41′32″N 73°38′40″W
- Country: United States
- State: New York
- County: Rensselaer

Area
  - Total: 0.9 sq mi (2.3 km^{2})
  - Land: 0.7 sq mi (1.8 km^{2})
  - Water: 0 sq mi (0.0 km^{2})
- Elevation: 488 ft (148.8 m)
- Time zone: UTC-5 (Eastern (EST))
  - Summer (DST): UTC-4 (EDT)
- ZIP code: 12198
- Area code: 518
- FIPS code: 36-83349
- GNIS feature ID: 0971770
- Website: www.snyderslake.org

Snyder's Lake
- Aires Lake
- Location within New York
- Location: North Greenbush, Rensselaer County, New York, United States of America
- Coordinates: 42°39′45″N 73°38′05″W
- Primary inflows: Spring fed plus 2 micro-affluents
- Primary outflows: 1 small confluent contributing to the Wynantskill, Hudson River, and Atlantic Ocean
- Designation: Public
- Max. length: 0.74 mi (1.19 km)
- Max. width: 0.37 mi (0.60 km)
- Surface area: 124 acres (50 ha)
- Average depth: 18 ft (5.5 m)
- Max. depth: 36.2 ft (11.0 m)
- Water volume: 124 acre⋅ft (153,000 m^{3})
- Shore length^{1}: 1.86 mi (2.99 km)
- ^{1} Shore length is not a well-defined measure.

Snyder's Lake is a hamlet of North Greenbush in Rensselaer County, New York, United States.

== History ==
The area is centered by the lake which bears its name. It is the only lake within the town of North Greenbush, and lies in an area that was once populated by the Mahicans, a Native American Tribe. Its original Mahican name is unknown. However, it was known as "Aries Lake" prior to 1897, when it was renamed for the family of Harmon Snyder, who had settled at Aires Lake during the American Revolution. Members of the Snyder family still live there.

Local legend has it that Aires Lake was much smaller and became Snyder's Lake when the Snyder family dammed the lake's only outlet at the northeast corner of the lake, flooding a much larger land area.

The settled area was formerly a mix of agricultural and residential zoning, with a large portion consisting of farmland. In the early 2000's the landscape started shifting to almost entirely residential zoning.

Many residents are traditional outdoorsmen, who still enjoy the abundance of local hunting and fishing. A 15 minute commute to downtown Albany allows for many career opportunities.

There is no official government within the area, as it is governed and represented by the town of North Greenbush. However, it has traditionally had an unelected person referred to as its mayor throughout its history. Most notable of these "mayors" was Webster "Whoopie" Scoville (1928-1991).

On the east end of the lake, a speak-easy/night club formerly known as the Excelsior House stood for approximately 100 years. It operated from the 1920s until the 1970s and was frequented by members of the Irish Mafia and notable characters such as Legs Diamond in its heyday. It was destroyed by fire in 2009.

== Geography ==
Snyder's Lake settled area has a total of 0.9 square miles (2.3 km^{2}).

=== Location ===
Snyder's Lake is located in the southeast corner of the town of North Greenbush. It is bordered by West Sand Lake Road (NY Route 150) on the north side, while NY Route 43 borders the area's south side.

Part of Rensselaer County Route 68, known as Pershing Avenue, runs through the center of the area. It is one of the area's two main thoroughfares, with Rensselaer County Route 67 (Troy Avenue and Geiser Road) being the other.

Peck Road borders the south end of the area.

== Demographics ==
There are no official demographic statistics for Snyder's Lake.

It is a middle class community with an estimated population between 500 and 1000.

The number of households is estimated to be between 100 and 200.

== Schools ==
Snyder's Lake is completely within the boundaries of the Averill Park Central School District, although a small percentage of its children attend private schools.
