= List of county routes in Rensselaer County, New York =

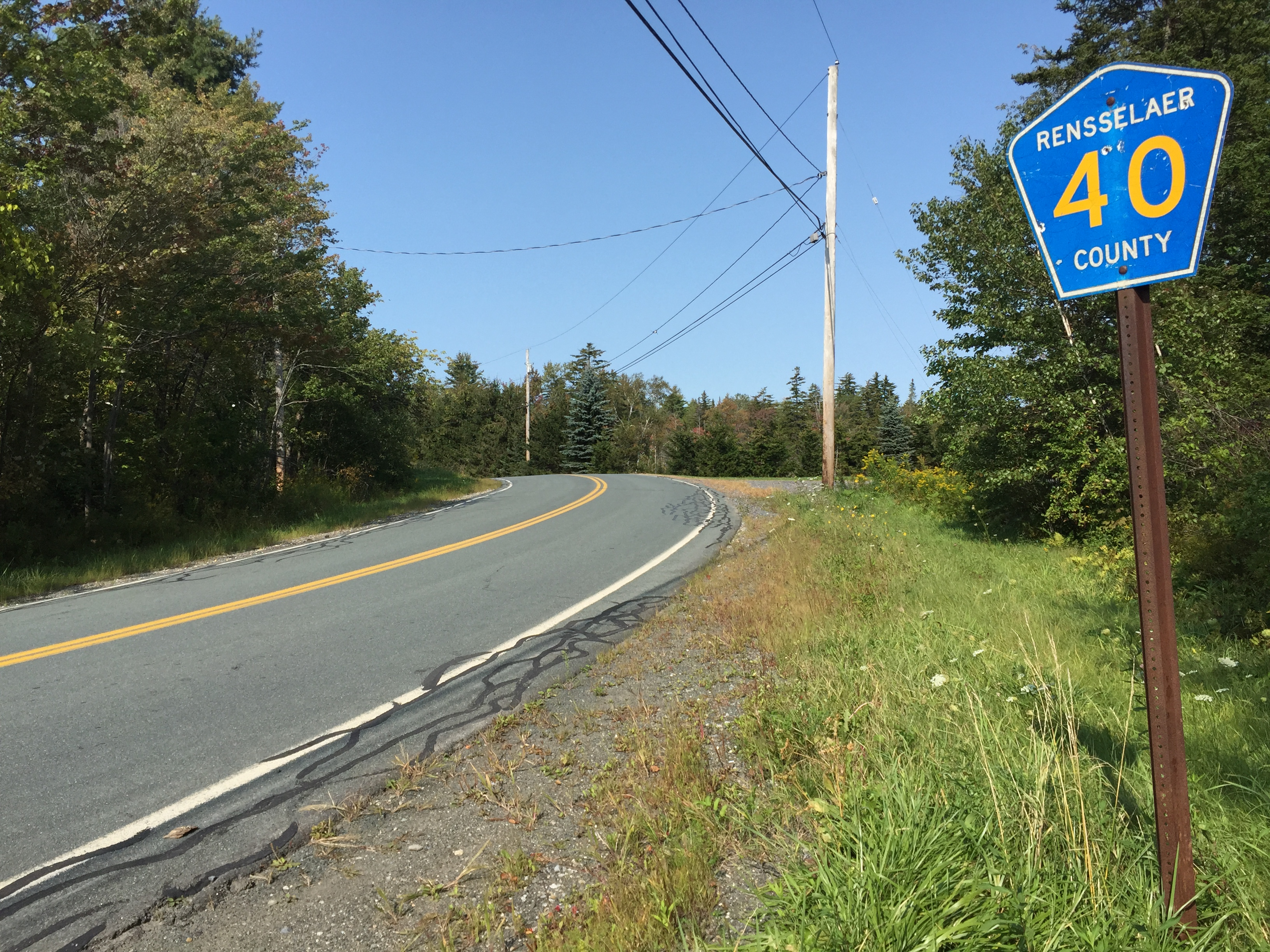
- Rensselaer County Route 40 reassurrance marker, an example of the type used in the county.

Highway names
- Interstates: Interstate X (I-X)
- US Highways: U.S. Route X (US X)
- State: New York State Route X (NY X)
- County: County Route X (CR X)

System links
- New York Highways; Interstate; US; State; Reference; Parkways

County routes in Rensselaer County, New York, are maintained by the Rensselaer County Highway Department and signed with the Manual on Uniform Traffic Control Devices-standard yellow-on-blue pentagon route marker. Routes generally do not enter cities or incorporated villages, except for CRs 117 & 118 in Valley Falls. County route numbers are assigned in clusters by town, with the number indicating the town that most of the route lies within:

- 1–9: Schodack
- 15–21: Nassau
- 23–33: Stephentown
- 36–42: Berlin
- 43–44: Poestenkill
- 45–53: Sand Lake
- 54–63: East Greenbush
- 65–76: North Greenbush
- 79–88: Grafton
- 90–98: Petersburgh
- 100–105: Hoosick
- 109–115, 117–118 and 123: Pittstown
- 116, 119–122 and 124–127: Schaghticoke
- 128–145: Brunswick

Each route entry below contains a link to its relation in OpenStreetMap (OSM).

== Routes 1–53 ==
Route	Length (mi)	Length (km)	From	Via	To	OSM relation	Notes
CR 1	4.07	6.55	Columbia County line (becomes CR 21)	Muitzkill Road in Schodack	NY 9J	354407	
CR 2	4.27	6.87	NY 9J	Schodack Landing Road in Schodack	Columbia County line	355652	
CR 3	3.94	6.34	CR 6	South Schodack Road in Schodack	CR 2	355662	
CR 4	4.41	7.10	CR 1	Van Hoesen Road in Schodack	US 9	355665	
CR 5	2.64	4.25	NY 150 in Schodack	Brookview Road	CR 58 in East Greenbush	355667	Formerly designated as CR 18
CR 6	3.41	5.49	Castleton-on-Hudson village line	Maple Hill Road in Schodack	US 9	355670	
CR 7	3.60	5.79	Nassau village line	Schodack–Nassau Road in Schodack	NY 150	339390	
CR 8	1.50	2.41	NY 9J	Stony Point Road in Schodack	Western Road	355674	
CR 9	0.45	0.72	NY 150	Lauster Terrace in Schodack	Cul-de-sac at US 9 / US 20	1527221	
CR 15	5.28	8.50	Nassau village line	Nassau–Averill Park Road in Nassau	CR 18 / CR 50 / CR 51	355675	
CR 16	4.35	7.00	CR 15	Central Nassau Road in Nassau	NY 66 / CR 21	355677	
CR 17	1.64	2.64	US 20	Lyons Lake Road in Nassau	Coldwater Tavern Road	355680	
CR 18	3.35	5.39	CR 15 / CR 50 / CR 51	Hoags Corners Road in Nassau	CR 16	351747	Formerly designated as CR 37
CR 19	0.25	0.40	Columbia County line (becomes CR 13)	Brainard Station Road in Nassau	US 20 / NY 66	660987	
CR 20	0.54	0.87	CR 18	Totem-Lodge Road in Nassau	Northwest corner of Burden Lake Country Club	352245	
CR 21	2.85	4.59	NY 66 / CR 16	Dunham-Hollow Road in Nassau	NY 43	355681	
CR 23	4.22	6.79	CR 26	Horse Heaven and South roads in Stephentown	NY 43	355683	
CR 26	8.35	13.44	NY 66 in Nassau	Garfield–East Nassau Road	NY 43 in Stephentown	355685	
CR 27	3.47	5.58	Columbia County line (becomes CR 9)	South Stephentown Road in Stephentown	CR 26	355708	
CR 28	3.08	4.96	CR 26	Presbyterian Hill and Wyomanock roads in Stephentown	NY 22	355711	
CR 29	0.85	1.37	Columbia County line (becomes CR 5A)	West Street in Stephentown	CR 28	355715	
CR 31	3.08	4.96	NY 43	Cranston Hill and West roads in Stephentown	NY 22	355721	
CR 32	0.30	0.48	Rensselaer County Highway Department Garage	Lodge and Sand Bank roads in Berlin	NY 22	1524200	
CR 33	4.47	7.19	NY 43	East and Giles roads in Stephentown	NY 22	355732	
CR 36	1.35	2.17	NY 22	Main Street in Berlin	NY 22	361139	
CR 37	3.58	5.76	CR 38 in Berlin	Cold Springs and Jones Hollow roads	CR 90 in Petersburgh	355737	
CR 38	2.21	3.56	CR 36	Green Hollow Road in Berlin	CR 37	354376	
CR 39	2.02	3.25	CR 40	Dyken Pond Road in Berlin	Fifty Six Road	354375	Formerly designated as CR 62
CR 40	13.00	20.92	NY 351 / NY 355 in Poestenkill	Plank Road	CR 36 in Berlin	352456	
CR 41	2.89	4.65	CR 42	Dutch Church Road in Berlin	CR 40	352760	Formerly designated as CR 44
CR 42	8.52	13.71	NY 43 / NY 66 in Sand Lake	Taborton Road	CR 41 in Berlin	352726	
CR 43	2.89	4.65	CR 42 in Sand Lake	Mosher and Oak Hill roads	CR 40 in Poestenkill	352819	
CR 44	1.49	2.40	CR 79	Columbia Hill Road in Poestenkill	CR 40	352869	
CR 45	1.48	2.38	NY 43	Averill Park Road in Sand Lake	NY 66	352061	Former routing of NY 66
CR 47	2.10	3.38	Nassau town line	North Nassau and Holcomb roads in Sand Lake	CR 49	352244	
CR 48			NY 43 / NY 66 / CR 42	Miller Hill Road in Sand Lake	NY 66		Transferred to state on April 1, 1980; now part of NY 66
CR 49	2.20	3.54	NY 43 / NY 66	Eastern Union Turnpike in Sand Lake	NY 43	352062	
CR 50	2.35	3.78	NY 150 / CR 55 in Sand Lake	Millers Corners Road	CR 15 / CR 18 / CR 51 in Nassau	351746	Formerly designated as CR 17
CR 51	3.87	6.23	CR 15 / CR 18 / CR 50 in Nassau	Burden Lake Road	NY 43 in Sand Lake	351795	
CR 52	2.36	3.80	NY 150	Sheer Road in Sand Lake	CR 51	339418	
CR 53	3.75	6.04	NY 151 in East Greenbush	Best Luther and Old Best roads	NY 43 in Sand Lake	351657	

== Routes 54–105 ==
Route	Length (mi)	Length (km)	From	Via	To	OSM relation	Notes
CR 54	1.09	1.75	Schodack town line	Miller Road in East Greenbush	NY 151	351703	
CR 55 (1) (Note: The two segments of CR 55 were originally connected; however, they were split when NY 43 was realigned through the area.)	0.37	0.60	Rensselaer city line	Washington Avenue in North Greenbush	CR 65	341467	Formerly part of NY 43
CR 55 (2)	5.83	9.38	NY 43 in North Greenbush	Best Road	NY 150 / CR 50 in Sand Lake	341467	Formerly NY 152
CR 56	2.83	4.55	US 9 / US 20	Elliot Road in East Greenbush	NY 151	352342	
CR 57	1.42	2.29	CR 58	Phillips Road in East Greenbush	US 9 / US 20	352931	Formerly designated as CR 36
CR 58	2.15	3.46	NY 9J	Hays Road in East Greenbush	US 9 / US 20	352932	
CR 59	0.68	1.09	US 9 / US 20	Sherwood Avenue in East Greenbush	NY 151	353181	Formerly designated as CR 53
CR 60	1.06	1.71	US 9 / US 20	Eastern and Hampton avenues in East Greenbush	NY 151	353182	
CR 63	0.30	0.48	NY 151	Red Mill Road in East Greenbush	Rensselaer city line	354388	
CR 65 (1) (Note: The two segments of CR 65 were originally connected; however, they were split when NY 43 was realigned through the area.)	0.34	0.55	US 4	South Bloomingrove Road in North Greenbush	Dead end	354399	
CR 65 (2)	2.80	4.51	Dead end	Bloomingrove Road in North Greenbush	NY 136	354399	
CR 66	1.70	2.74	CR 65	Reynolds and Lape roads in North Greenbush	NY 43	355753	
CR 67	3.95	6.36	NY 43	Geiser Road, Troy Avenue, and Hidley Road in North Greenbush	NY 136	355759	
CR 68	7.26	11.68	CR 65 in North Greenbush	Snyders Lake Road, Pershing Ave, and Snyders Corners Road	NY 351 in Poestenkill	355765	
CR 69	1.70	2.74	NY 43	Peck Road in North Greenbush	CR 68	355770	
CR 71	1.20	1.93	CR 67	Edwards Road in North Greenbush	NY 150	355771	
CR 74	2.75	4.43	US 4	Winter Street Extension and Cameron Road in North Greenbush	NY 136	355776	Winter Street portion was formerly part of NY 405
CR 75	1.19	1.92	NY 66 in North Greenbush	Sharpe Road	CR 130 in Brunswick	356286	
CR 76	0.86	1.38	Dead end	Glenmore Road in North Greenbush	US 4 / NY 136	356300	
CR 79	6.76	10.88	CR 40 in Poestenkill	Blue Factory Road	NY 2 in Brunswick	356311	
CR 80	2.90	4.67	CR 79	Madonna Lake Road in Grafton	CR 85	356546	
CR 84	2.20	3.54	NY 2	Old State Road in Grafton	NY 2	356547	
CR 85	3.04	4.89	CR 80	South Road in Grafton	NY 2	356550	
CR 87	6.52	10.49	NY 2 in Grafton	Babcock Lake Road	NY 7 in Hoosick	356559	
CR 88	4.91	7.90	NY 2 in Grafton	Taconic Lake and Toad Point roads	Coon Brook Road in Petersburgh	356564	Formerly designated as CR 85
CR 90	0.72	1.16	Hewett Road	River Road in Petersburgh	NY 2	356606	
CR 91	2.13	3.43	NY 2	East Hollow Road in Petersburgh	NY 2	356633	
CR 92	1.17	1.88	NY 2	Dayfoot Road in Petersburgh	NY 2	356650	
CR 94	1.73	2.78	NY 2	Dill Brook Road in Petersburgh	NY 22	356670	
CR 95	5.20	8.37	NY 346 in Petersburgh	Petersburg Junction and Hill roads	Hoosick Falls village line in Hoosick	356684	
CR 96	2.04	3.28	CR 95	Indian Massacre Road in Petersburgh	Vermont state line	356708	
CR 98	2.80	4.51	Fox Hollow Road at Grafton town line	Rabbit College Road in Petersburgh	NY 22 / NY 346	356713	
CR 100	3.76	6.05	CR 95	Breese Hollow Road in Hoosick	NY 7	356719	
CR 101	1.03	1.66	Hoosick Falls village line	Ball Street Extension in Hoosick	CR 102	356721	
CR 102	4.94	7.95	NY 22	Johnson Hill and East Hoosick roads in Hoosick	NY 7	356722	
CR 103	8.42	13.55	NY 7 in Hoosick	Buskirk–West Hoosick and Pine Valley roads	Washington County line in Hoosick (becomes CR 59)	357071	Discontinuous from CR 105 to 1.92 miles (3.09 km) east of CR 105
CR 104	3.60	5.79	CR 103	Clay Hill Road in Hoosick	Hoosick Falls village line	357478	Formerly designated as CR 12
CR 105	1.93	3.11	NY 7	Spicer and Windy Hill roads in Hoosick	CR 103	357480	

== Routes 109–145 ==
Route	Length (mi)	Length (km)	From	Via	To	OSM relation	Notes
CR 109	4.63	7.45	NY 7 / CR 129 in Pittstown	Simmons and Groveside roads	CR 103 in Hoosick	357481	Formerly designated as CR 63
CR 110	0.71	1.14	CR 115	Tomhannock Village Road in Pittstown	CR 113	357483	Formerly extended to CR 109
CR 111	7.42	11.94	NY 7 in Pittstown	Parker School, Lewis, and Pittstown–Johnsville roads	CR 114 in Schaghticoke	357493	
CR 112	0.54	0.87	CR 114	Long Meadow Road in Schaghticoke	CR 111	357524	
CR 113	3.20	5.15	CR 110	Tomhannock–Johnsonville Road in Pittstown	CR 111	357527	
CR 114	5.02	8.08	NY 67	Master Street in Schaghticoke	Washington County line (becomes CR 74)	357531	
CR 115	5.73	9.22	NY 7	Tomhannock Reservoir Road in Pittstown	CR 117	357534	Formerly designated as CR 107
CR 116	0.26	0.42	Troy city line	Brickyard Road in Schaghticoke	NY 40	357600	
CR 117	6.28	10.11	NY 40 in Schaghticoke	Melrose–Valley Falls Road and State Street	NY 67 in Valley Falls	357538	Formerly part of NY 40A
CR 118	1.94	3.12	CR 115 in Pittstown	Stover Road	CR 117 in Valley Falls	357541	
CR 119	1.36	2.19	CR 117	Madigan Road in Schaghticoke	CR 117	357543	
CR 120	0.92	1.48	CR 125	River Road in Schaghticoke	Washington County line (becomes CR 113)	357544	
CR 121	5.04	8.11	CR 122	River Road in Schaghticoke	NY 67	357568	
CR 122	1.93	3.11	CR 121	Calhoun Drive in Schaghticoke	NY 40	357569	
CR 123	2.14	3.44	NY 7	Ford Road in Pittstown	Cushmen Road	357570	
CR 124	0.84	1.35	Troy city line	New Turnpike and Haughney roads in Schaghticoke	Old railroad grade	357576	
CR 125	4.46	7.18	NY 915C at Champlain Canal Lock 4	Stillwater Bridge Road in Schaghticoke	NY 40 / NY 67	357549	Former routing of NY 67
CR 126	4.56	7.34	NY 40 in Schaghticoke	Fogarty and Cooksboro roads	NY 7 in Brunswick	357585	
CR 127	0.58	0.93	Troy city line	River Road in Schaghticoke	CR 124	357577	
CR 128	3.59	5.78	Troy city line in Brunswick	Plank Road	CR 126 in Pittstown	357612	
CR 129	9.14	14.71	NY 278 in Brunswick	Tamarac Road	NY 7 / CR 109 in Pittstown	357613	
CR 130	3.49	5.62	Troy city line in Brunswick	Spring Avenue Extension	NY 355 in Poestenkill	357619	Formerly part of NY 154
CR 132	1.31	2.11	CR 137	Dater Hill Road in Brunswick	Dearstyne Road	357655	
CR 133	2.10	3.38	NY 2	Moonlawn Road in Brunswick	NY 278	357659	
CR 134	2.71	4.36	NY 7	Mcchesney Avenue and McChesney Avenue Extension in Brunswick	CR 133	357660	
CR 135	1.60	2.57	CR 134	Town Office Road in Brunswick	NY 7	357663	
CR 137	2.74	4.41	NY 355 in Poestenkill	Garfield Road	NY 2 in Brunswick	357667	
CR 139	1.97	3.17	CR 130	Creek Road in Brunswick	NY 2	357690	
CR 140	2.90	4.67	Troy city line	Pinewood Avenue in Brunswick	NY 2	357692	
CR 141	0.61	0.98	Troy city line	South Lake Avenue in Brunswick	Troy city line	357694	
CR 142	0.46	0.74	Troy city line	Mountainview Avenue in Brunswick	CR 130	357699	
CR 144	2.50	4.02	Troy city line	North Lake Avenue in Brunswick	NY 142	357695	Part of NY 317 from the early 1940s to April 14, 1980. (Note: NY 317 continued south along North Lake Avenue to NY 7 in Troy.)
CR 145	1.32	2.12	Troy city line	Oakwood Avenue in Brunswick	Troy city line	357700	Entire length overlaps with NY 40

== See also ==
- County routes in New York
- List of former state routes in New York (301–400)
