= New York State Route 150 =

State highway in Rensselaer County, New York, US

New York State Route 150
- Map of Rensselaer County in eastern New York with NY 150 highlighted in red

Route information
- Maintained by NYSDOT
- Length: 17.50 mi (28.16 km)
- Existed: 1930–present

Major junctions
- South end: NY 9J in Castleton-on-Hudson
- US 9 / US 20 in Schodack; NY 43 in Sand Lake
- North end: NY 66 in North Greenbush

Location
- Country: United States
- State: New York
- Counties: Rensselaer

Highway system
- New York Highways; Interstate; US; State; Reference; Parkways
← NY 149	→ NY 151

New York State Route 150 (NY 150) is a north–south state highway in Rensselaer County, New York, in the United States. The southern terminus of the route is at NY 9J in Castleton-on-Hudson. Its northern terminus is at a junction with NY 66 in the hamlet of Wynantskill, located within the town of North Greenbush.

== Route description ==
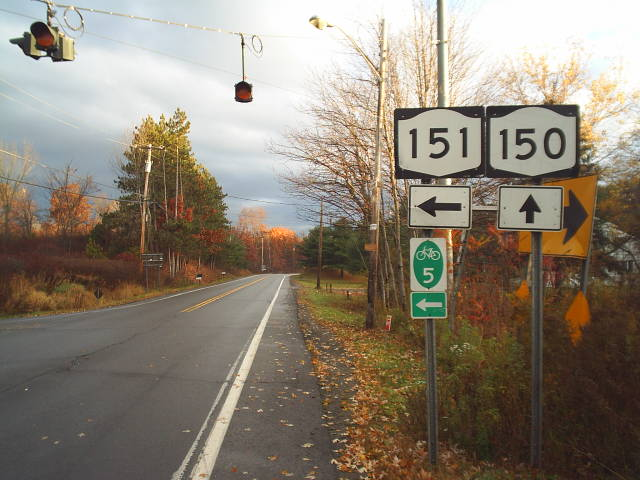
NY 150 northbound at the junction with NY 151 in Schodack

NY 150 begins at an intersection with NY 9J (Main Street) in the village of Castleton-on-Hudson in front of the Hudson River and Amtrak line through the village. Known as Scott Avenue, NY 150 heads up the hills overlooking the village, becoming the main two-lane west–east village street, passing numerous residences. After winding through the village, the route turns northeast into the town of Schodack, where it retains the name Scott Avenue until the junction with County Route 6 (CR 6 or Maple Hill Road / Seaman Avenue). Now known as Brookview Road, NY 150 turns northeastward through Schodack, becoming a two-lane rural street along the Moordener Kill.

Continuing to the northeast, NY 150 reaches the hamlet of Brookview, crossing a junction with the eastern terminus of CR 8 (Western Road). NY 150 continues northeast through the residential section of Brookview, reaching the southern terminus of CR 5 (Brookview Road). At this junction, NY 150 turns eastward through Schodack Valley Road. A residential road through Schodack, NY 150 passes south of Evergreen Cemetery, paralleling the Moodener Kill. At the junction with South Old Post Road, the route crosses under I-90. After crossing under the interstate, NY 150 reaches the southern end of the hamlet of Schodack Center.

In Schodack Center, NY 150 junctions with US 9 and US 20 (Columbia Turnpike). At this junction, NY 150 becomes East Schodack Road, continuing east out of Schodack Center, past Schodack Town Park and a nearby mobile home park. At the junction with Linda Way, the route bends eastward, reaching the residential hamlet of East Schodack. In the center of East Schodack, NY 150 junctions with the northern terminus of CR 7, where it bends northeast, dropping the East Schodack Road moniker. Progressing northeast through Schodack, the rural roadway begins winding northward, reaching the eastern terminus of NY 151 (Luther Road). A short distance northeast of NY 151, NY 150 crosses into the town of Sand Lake.

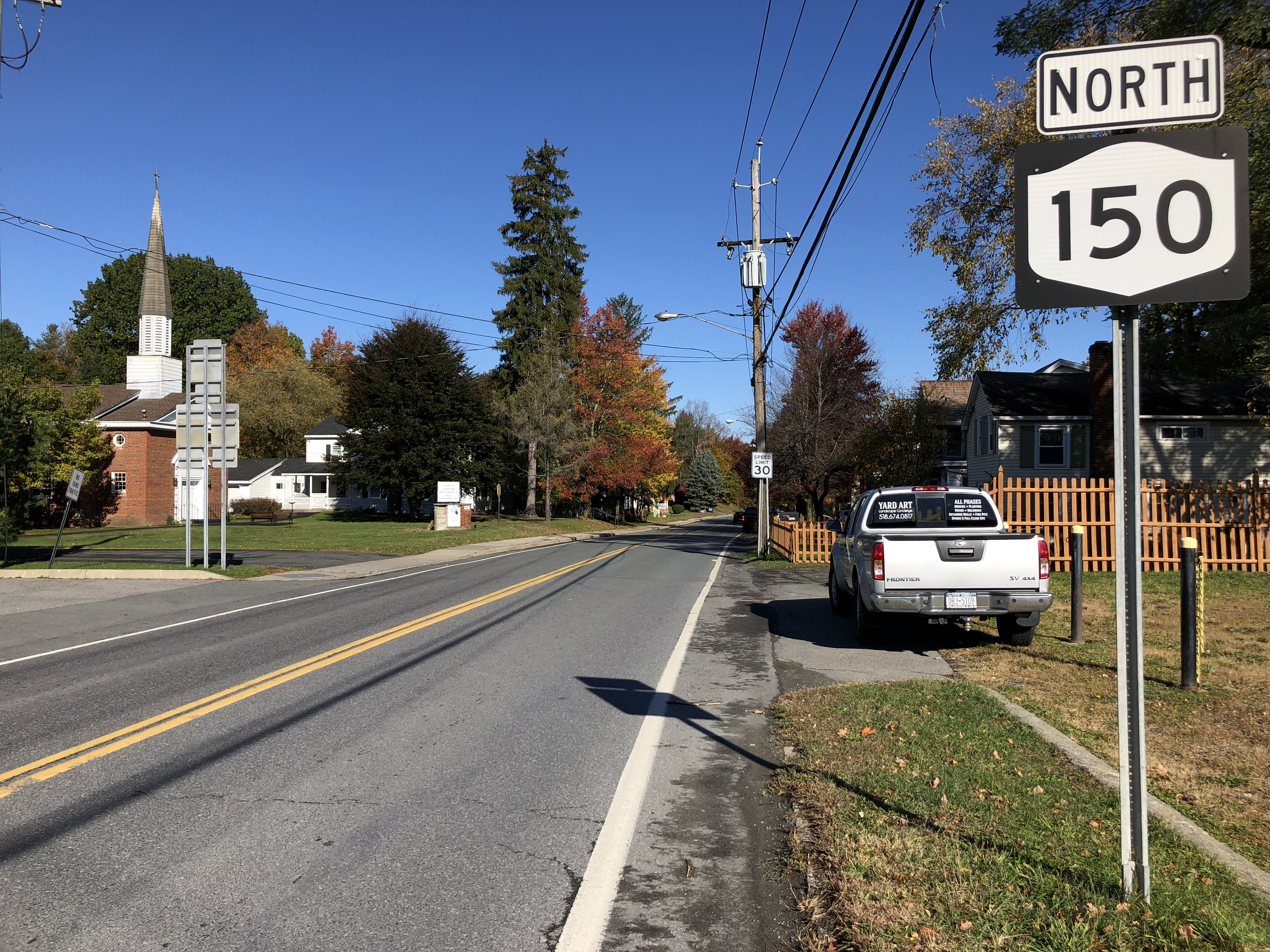
NY 150 northbound past NY 43 in Sand Lake

Now in Sand Lake, NY 150 continues northeast through a rural section of town, bending northward into the hamlet of Sliters, where it junctions with CR 55 (Best Road) and CR 50 (Millers Corners Road). North of Stilers, the route continues north through the town of Sand Lake, remaining a two-lane rural road. More homes begin to appear after about 1-mile (1.6 km), reaching the western terminus of CR 52 (Sheer Road). NY 150 turns northwest at this junction, reaching the residential hamlet of West Sand Lake. In the center of the hamlet, NY 150 meets a junction with NY 43 (West Sand Lake Road).

Now in a commercial neighborhood, NY 150 soon leaves West Sand Lake and continues north as West Sand Lake Road. Soon crossing into the town of Poestenkill, NY 150 reaches a junction with CR 68 (Pershing Avenue / Snyders Corners Road) in the hamlet of Snyders Corners. The route through Snyders Corners is residential, crossing into the town of North Greenbush. Retaining the West Sand Lake Road moniker, NY 150 winds northwest into the hamlet of Wynantskill, bypassing the hamlet of Eastmor in the process. Through Wynantskill, NY 150 continues through the center of the hamlet, passing numerous residences until reaching a junction with the terminus of NY 136 (Whiteview Road).

NY 150 turns northeast on NY 136's right-of-way, going a couple blocks as West Sand Lake Road until a junction with NY 66 (Main Avenue). At this junction, the NY 150 junction terminates at a t-intersection.

== History ==
NY 150 was assigned as part of the 1930 renumbering of state highways in New York to an alignment extending from Castleton-on-Hudson northeastward to Schodack Center. The route was extended northeastward to NY 66 in Wynantskill by the following year.

== Major intersections ==
The entire route is in Rensselaer County.

Location	mi	km	Destinations	Notes
Castleton-on-Hudson	0.00	0.00	NY 9J (Main Street)	Southern terminus
Town of Schodack	4.97	8.00	US 9 / US 20 – Albany, Nassau	Hamlet of Schodack Center
Town of Schodack	9.41	15.14	NY 151 west (Luther Road)	Eastern terminus of NY 151; hamlet of Shivers Corners
Town of Sand Lake	10.73	17.27	CR 55 west (Best Road) / CR 50 east (Millers Corners Road)	Termini of CR 55 and CR 50; CR 55 was formerly NY 152; hamlet of Sliters
Town of Sand Lake	13.55	21.81	NY 43 (West Sand Lake Road)	Hamlet of West Sand Lake
North Greenbush	17.25	27.76	NY 136 west (Whiteview Road)	Eastern terminus of NY 136; hamlet of Wynantskill
North Greenbush	17.50	28.16	NY 66 (Main Avenue) – Troy, Poestenkill, Averill Park	Northern terminus; hamlet of Wynantskill
1.000 mi = 1.609 km; 1.000 km = 0.621 mi
