= New York State Route 7 (disambiguation) =

New York State Route 7 is a generally east–west state highway in New York, United States, that was established in 1927 and extends from the Pennsylvania state line near Binghamton to the Vermont state line near Troy.

New York State Route 7 may also refer to:

- New York State Route 7 (1924–mid-1920s) in Rensselaer County
- New York State Route 7 (mid-1920s–1927) from Buffalo to Albany
