= New York State Route 136 =

State highway in Rensselaer County, New York, US

New York State Route 136
- Map of Rensselaer County in eastern New York with NY 136 highlighted in red

Route information
- Maintained by NYSDOT
- Length: 2.62 mi (4.22 km)
- Existed: c. 1938–present

Major junctions
- West end: US 4 in North Greenbush
- East end: NY 150 in North Greenbush

Location
- Country: United States
- State: New York
- Counties: Rensselaer

Highway system
- New York Highways; Interstate; US; State; Reference; Parkways
← NY 135	→ NY 137

New York State Route 136 (NY 136) is a state highway within the town of North Greenbush in Rensselaer County, New York, in the United States. It begins at an intersection with U.S. Route 4 (US 4) just south of Troy and ends at a junction with NY 150 in the hamlet of Wynantskill. NY 136 provides access to Hudson Valley Community College, located in an otherwise residential area of suburban Troy. The route was assigned in the late 1930s as a connector between US 4 and Winter Street, then part of NY 40. NY 136 was extended to its current length in 1980.

== Route description ==
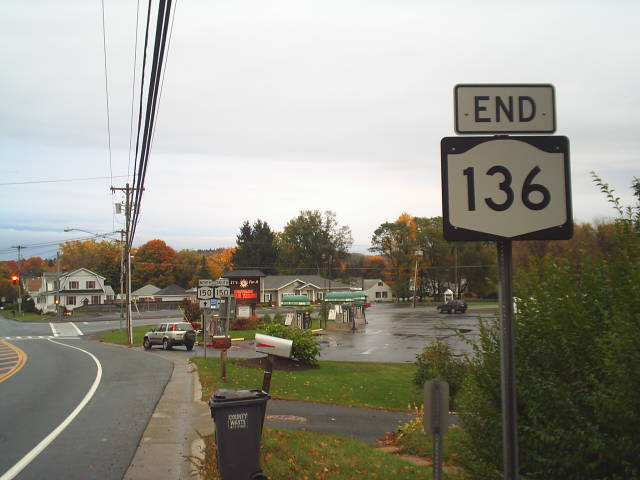
NY 136 approaching the intersection with NY 150 in Wynantskill

NY 136 begins south of the city of Troy at an intersection with US 4 (North Greenbush Road) in North Greenbush. Here, NY 136 also connects to County Route 76 (CR 76, named Glenmore Road), which provides access to the headquarters for the 42nd Infantry (Rainbow) Division of the New York Army National Guard. The route heads eastward as Williams Road, intersecting with CR 65 (Bloomingrove Drive) as it passes south of La Salle Institute and Hudson Valley Community College. Near the eastern edge of the college campus, NY 136 connects to a local road leading north to the college and Joseph L. Bruno Stadium.

The route progresses past several residences adjacent to the college before intersecting with CR 74 (Winter Street Extension), formerly an intersection with NY 405. At that intersection, NY 136 changes names to Whiteview Road. The route continues to run through residential areas of North Greenbush, providing the northern terminus of CR 67 (Hidley Road) prior to entering the hamlet of Wynantskill and assuming the name West Sand Lake Road. Within Wynantskill, NY 136 terminates at a three-way intersection with NY 150 (West Sand Lake Road).

== History ==
NY 136 was assigned c. 1938; however, it consisted only of the portion of the route on Whiteview Road between Winter Street Extension (at the time part of NY 40) and NY 150 upon assignment. On April 1, 1980, ownership and maintenance of Williams Road (CR 70), a local east–west highway linking US 4 to Winter Street Extension, was transferred from Rensselaer County to the state of New York as part of a highway maintenance swap between the two levels of government. The new state highway became a westward extension of NY 136. In between Williams Road and Whiteview Road, NY 136 initially used a small portion of Winter Street Extension, which had been NY 405 prior to the swap. The junction between NY 136 and Winter Street Extension has since been reconfigured to directly connect Williams and Whiteview Roads.

== Major intersections ==
The entire route is in North Greenbush, Rensselaer County.

mi	km	Destinations	Notes
0.00	0.00	US 4 (Williams Road) to I-90 / I-787	
0.89	1.43	CR 74 (Winter Street Extension) – Albany, Troy	Formerly NY 405
2.62	4.22	NY 150 (West Sand Lake Road)	Hamlet of Wynantskill
1.000 mi = 1.609 km; 1.000 km = 0.621 mi
