= District School No. 3 =

District School No. 3 can refer to the following:

- District School No. 3 (Rockfield, Indiana), listed on the NRHP in Indiana
- District School No. 3 (Chaumont, New York), listed on the NRHP in New York
- District School No. 3 (Castleton-on-Hudson, New York), listed on the NRHP in New York
