= New York State Route 405 =

Former state highway in New York State

New York State Route 405
- NY 405 highlighted in red

Route information
- Maintained by NYSDOT and the city of Troy
- Length: 2.63 mi (4.23 km)
- Existed: February–March 1973–April 1, 1980

Major junctions
- South end: US 4 in North Greenbush
- North end: NY 66 in Troy

Location
- Country: United States
- State: New York
- Counties: Rensselaer

Highway system
- New York Highways; Interstate; US; State; Reference; Parkways
← NY 404	→ NY 406

New York State Route 405 (NY 405) was a state highway in Rensselaer County, New York, in the United States. It ran for 2.63 miles (4.23 km) between an intersection with U.S. Route 4 in North Greenbush and a junction with NY 66 just inside the Troy city limits. In between, NY 405 intersected NY 136. The entirety of NY 405 was originally part of NY 40. In the February–March 1973, NY 40 was truncated northward to NY 7 in northern Troy and its former routing from US 4 to NY 66 was assigned NY 405. Ownership and maintenance of most of NY 405 was transferred to Rensselaer County on April 1, 1980, at which time the parts of the route given to the county were redesignated as part of County Route 74 (CR 74).

== Route description ==
NY 405 began at an intersection with U.S. Route 4 in North Greenbush. It headed eastward and northeastward on Winter Street through a residential area to an intersection with NY 136. At the time, the intersection was the western terminus of NY 136. NY 405 continued northeastward into the city of Troy, where it ended at a junction with NY 66 in the extreme southeastern corner of the city.

== History ==
NY 40 initially extended south of Troy to East Greenbush when it was assigned as part of the 1930 renumbering of state highways in New York. All of NY 40 from 125th Street in Troy southward was concurrent to U.S. Route 4. By 1932, NY 40 was rerouted south of Troy to leave US 4 at Winter Street and follow the street through North Greenbush and into Troy. At the end of Winter Street, NY 40 turned northwest, overlapping NY 66 into downtown Troy. The overlap between US 4 and NY 40 from East Greenbush to North Greenbush was eliminated in the late 1950s when NY 40 was truncated northward to the junction of US 4 and Winter Street. NY 40 originally overlapped with NY 7 through northern Troy and NY 66 out of the city. As part of numerous changes by the New York State Department of Transportation (NYSDOT) in February–March 1973, a new alignment would have NY 40 run down Oakwood Avenue to Hoosick Street in Troy, ending there. In response, a new route was created on the former alignment along Winter Street, designated as NY 405.

On April 1, 1980, ownership and maintenance of NY 405 from US 4 through its junction with NY 136 to the Troy city line was transferred from the state of New York to Rensselaer County as part of a highway maintenance swap between the two levels of government. The portions of NY 405 transferred to the county were redesignated as part of CR 74 while Williams Road became part of a westward extension of NY 136. Maintenance of Winter Street in the city of Troy remained the responsibility of the city of Troy, as it had been during NY 405's existence.

== Major intersections ==
The entire route was in Rensselaer County.

Location	mi	km	Destinations	Notes
North Greenbush	0.00	0.00	US 4	Southern terminus
North Greenbush	1.62	2.61	NY 136	Western terminus of NY 136
Troy	2.63	4.23	NY 66	Northern terminus
1.000 mi = 1.609 km; 1.000 km = 0.621 mi

== See also ==
- List of county routes in Rensselaer County, New York
