= Brookview, New York =

Hamlet in Rensselaer County

Brookview
- hamlet
- Location of Brookview in New York
- Coordinates: 42°32′28″N 73°43′11″W
- Country: United States
- State: New York
- County: Rensselaer

Brookview, New York is a small hamlet in Rensselaer County, located in Schodack, New York and just outside Castleton, New York.

Brookview is named for the Moordener Kill that runs through the hamlet. Brookview Road runs from East Greenbush through Brookview and then to Castleton-on-Hudson, New York. The hamlet of Brookview, however, includes only a small portion of Brookview Road. A section of Brookview Road is part of New York State Route 150. Brookview is mostly residential. A New York Central Railroad train station was located in the hamlet until it was taken down in the mid 20th century.
