= New York State Route 151 =

State highway in Rensselaer County, New York, US

New York State Route 151
- Map of Rensselaer County in eastern New York with NY 151 highlighted in red

Route information
- Maintained by NYSDOT and the city of Rensselaer
- Length: 8.23 mi (13.24 km)
- Existed: 1930–present

Major junctions
- West end: US 9 / US 20 in Rensselaer
- US 4 in East Greenbush
- East end: NY 150 in Schodack

Location
- Country: United States
- State: New York
- Counties: Rensselaer

Highway system
- New York Highways; Interstate; US; State; Reference; Parkways
← NY 150	→ NY 152

New York State Route 151 (NY 151) is an 8.23-mile (13.24 km) state highway located in Rensselaer County, New York, in the United States. Its western terminus is at an interchange with the U.S. Route 9 (US 9) and US 20 in Rensselaer, and its eastern terminus is at a junction with NY 150 in Shivers Corners, a hamlet in the town of Schodack. It also has an intersection with US 4 in East Greenbush. NY 151 was assigned to most of its current alignment as part of the 1930 renumbering of state highways in New York. In Rensselaer, NY 151 has been altered several times, with the most recent change coming in the late 1990s. The current western terminus of NY 151 was once the western terminus of NY 43.

== Route description ==
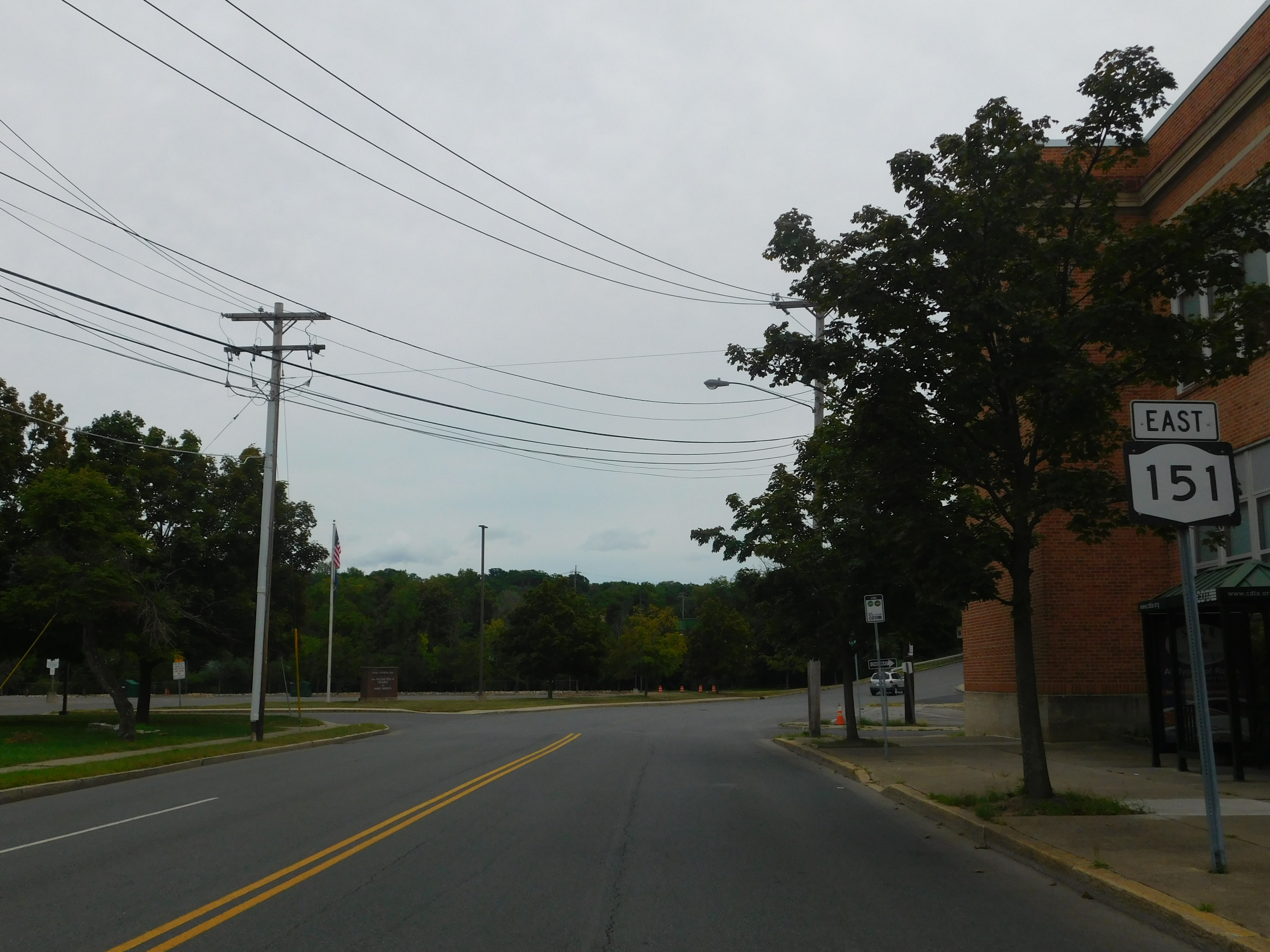
NY 151 in Rensselaer

NY 151 begins as a city-maintained highway at a junction with US 9 and US 20 in Rensselaer, near the Hudson River. Known as 3rd Avenue, the two-lane route heads towards the southeast in a largely developed area. Upon assuming an eastward route, the highway crosses over a series of Amtrak tracks, passing south of the Albany–Rensselaer rail station and entering a more residential area. NY 151 turns slightly towards the northeast as it leaves the city of Rensselaer and becomes maintained by the New York State Department of Transportation (NYSDOT) as it passes into the town of East Greenbush.

Just east of the city line, NY 151 veers to the south at an intersection with Barrack Road. While 3rd Avenue continues eastward as the unsigned NY 915E, NY 151 follows Barrack Road through a less-developed—and at times forested—landscape as it passes through the town. After 0.5 miles (0.8 km), the highway curves to the southeast, intersecting County Route 63 (CR 63) and changing street names to Red Mill Road in the process. It continues on a southeasterly alignment across Mill Creek to a junction with US 4. At this point, it becomes known as Luther Road as it turns northeastward towards Interstate 90 (I-90). NY 151 subsequently passes under the freeway and crosses Mill Creek a second time. After resuming a southeastern path, the route loses its street name and terminates at NY 150 in Shivers Corners, a hamlet in the town of Schodack.

== History ==
NY 151 was assigned as part of the 1930 renumbering of state highways in New York to a routing similar to its current alignment. At the time, NY 151 began at the intersection of Third Avenue (then-NY 152) and High Street in Rensselaer and followed the length of High Street and Red Mill Road to where it merged with its current alignment southeast of the city. West of High Street, what is now NY 151 was the westernmost portion of NY 152. NY 152 was truncated to Defreestville on its western end c. 1937. Its former routing along Third Avenue from Rensselaer to Defreestville was redesignated as NY 381. NY 381 was supplanted by a rerouted NY 43 in the late 1960s.

In the late 1970s, NY 151 was rerouted off High Street and onto a new roadway, Barracks Road, in the vicinity of Rensselaer. As a result, the roadway no longer entered the Rensselaer city limits. It was re-extended into the city by way of Third Avenue in the late 1990s when NY 43 was rerouted to meet I-90 at the new exit 8 west of Defreestville. Like NY 43 before it, NY 151 terminated at an interchange linking Third Avenue to US 9 and US 20.

== Major intersections ==
The entire route is in Rensselaer County.

Location	mi	km	Destinations	Notes
Rensselaer	0.00	0.00	US 9 / US 20 to I-787 / Broadway – Albany, Albany–Rensselaer station	Western terminus; interchange; Broadway continues west
Town of East Greenbush	0.97	1.56	Third Avenue Extension (NY 915E east)	Formerly part of NY 43 and NY 381
Town of East Greenbush	3.14	5.05	US 4 to I-90 – East Greenbush, Troy	Traffic circle; hamlet of Couse Corners
Town of Schodack	8.23	13.24	NY 150	Eastern terminus; hamlet of Shivers Corners
1.000 mi = 1.609 km; 1.000 km = 0.621 mi
