= East Schodack, New York =

Hamlet in New York, United States

Coordinates: 42°33′43″N 73°38′00″W

East Schodack is a hamlet in Rensselaer County, New York, United States. It comprises the ZIP code of 12063.

It is located southeast of Albany and Troy, New York, in the town of Schodack. It is located in the northeastern corner of the town, and was formerly called Scotts Corners, which is also the name of a hamlet in Westchester County.

New York Route 150 is the main highway in the community.

The East Schodack Fire District, the local fire department, had an election on December 9, 2009.
