= Massachusetts Route 43 =

State highway in Berkshire County, Massachusetts, US

Route 43
- Route 43 highlighted in red

Route information
- Maintained by MassDOT
- Length: 15.67 mi (25.22 km)
- Existed: November 1930–present

Major junctions
- South end: NY 43 at the New York state line in Hancock
- US 7 in Williamstown
- North end: Route 2 in Williamstown

Location
- Country: United States
- State: Massachusetts
- Counties: Berkshire

Highway system
- Massachusetts State Highway System; Interstate; US; State
← Route 41	→ US 44

Route 43 is a 15.67-mile-long (25.22 km) extension of New York State Route 43 (NY 43) into Massachusetts. Unlike NY 43, which is signed east-west, Massachusetts Route 43 is a north-south route. Route 43's northern terminus is at Route 2 in Williamstown. Along the way it intersects U.S. Route 7 (US 7) in Williamstown.

== Route description ==
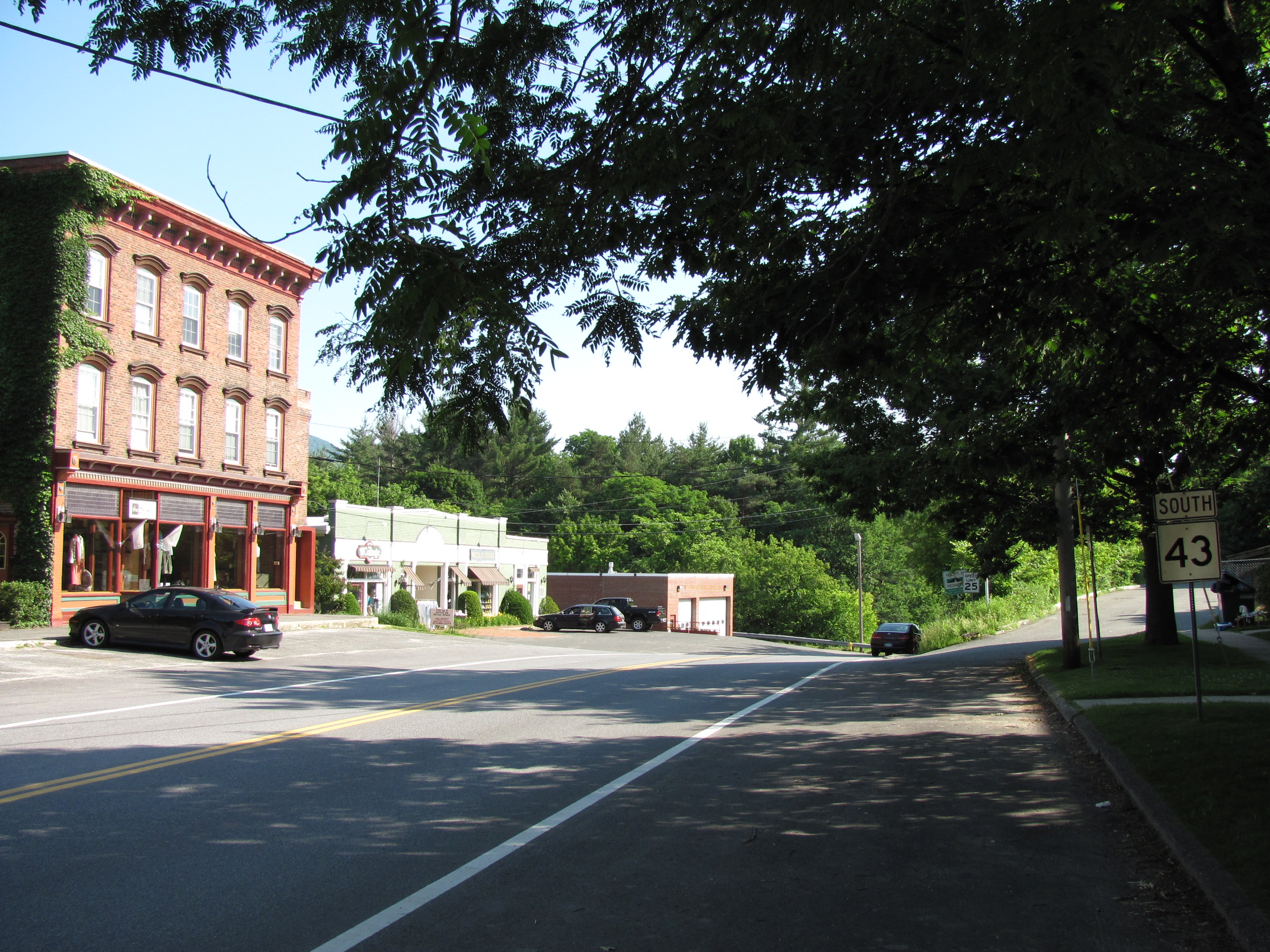
Southbound in Williamstown, just south of Route 2.

Massachusetts Route 43 begins at the eastern end of New York State Route 43 in Hancock. It turns northward through the Kinderhook Creek valley in the Taconic Mountains, passing near Jiminy Peak, and passing through the northern half of Hancock before entering Williamstown. In Williamstown, the road continues north-northeastward, and crosses U.S. Route 7 in the southern part of town. After crossing U.S. 7, the road turns right onto Green River Road, which follows its namesake (a tributary of the Hoosac River) around the south and east sides of Stone Hill, before ending at Route 2 just east of the Williams College campus.

Historically, Route 43 was a part of New England Route 7, also known as the Mohawk Trail. The Mohawk Trail now ends on Route 2 at U.S. Route 7 in the center of Williamstown.

== Major intersections ==
The entire route is in Berkshire County.

Location	mi	km	Destinations	Notes
Hancock	0.00	0.00	NY 43 west – Albany, NY	Continuation into New York
Williamstown	10.9	17.5	US 7 to US 20 – Pittsfield, Williamstown	
Williamstown	15.67	25.22	Route 2 – Boston, Troy, NY	Northern terminus
1.000 mi = 1.609 km; 1.000 km = 0.621 mi
