= Wynantskill, New York =

- CDP
- Location in Rensselaer County and the state of New York.

- Location within the state of New York
- Coordinates: 42°41′32″N 73°38′40″W
- Country: United States
- State: New York
- County: Rensselaer

Area
  - Total: 3.42 sq mi (8.87 km^{2})
  - Land: 3.42 sq mi (8.85 km^{2})
  - Water: 0.0077 sq mi (0.02 km^{2})
- Elevation: 335 ft (102 m)

Population (2020)
  - Total: 4,050
  - Density: 1,184.6/sq mi (457.37/km^{2})
- Time zone: UTC-5 (Eastern (EST))
  - Summer (DST): UTC-4 (EDT)
- ZIP code: 12198
- Area code: 518
- FIPS code: 36-83349
- GNIS feature ID: 0971770

Wynantskill is a census-designated place (CDP) in Rensselaer County, New York, United States. The population was 4,050 at the 2020 census. Wynantskill is located at the northern town line and the northeastern corner of the town of North Greenbush. The community is a suburb of Troy. State Route 66 (Pawling Ave. in Troy, Main Ave. in Wynantskill) is the main route through the community. Wynantskill has a major grocery store, several banks and restaurants, a craft beverage store, convenience stores, hardware store and a post office with almost all houses located on side streets off Main Ave. Other major roads are Whiteview Road (NY 136), a primarily residential road that leads to US 4; and West Sand Lake Road (NY 150).

== Geography ==
Wynantskill is located at 42°41′32″N 73°38′40″W (42.692139, -73.644580).

According to the United States Census Bureau, the CDP has a total area of 2.4 square miles (6.2 km^{2}), all land.

== Demographics ==
Historical population
Census	Pop.	Note	%±
2000	3,018		—
2010	3,276		8.5%
2020	4,050		23.6%
U.S. Decennial Census

=== 2020 census ===
As of the 2020 census, Wynantskill had a population of 4,050. The median age was 44.6 years. 20.2% of residents were under the age of 18 and 20.0% of residents were 65 years of age or older. For every 100 females there were 94.2 males, and for every 100 females age 18 and over there were 89.5 males age 18 and over.

100.0% of residents lived in urban areas, while 0.0% lived in rural areas.

There were 1,709 households in Wynantskill, of which 26.2% had children under the age of 18 living in them. Of all households, 50.3% were married-couple households, 14.9% were households with a male householder and no spouse or partner present, and 28.3% were households with a female householder and no spouse or partner present. About 30.1% of all households were made up of individuals and 15.5% had someone living alone who was 65 years of age or older.

There were 1,782 housing units, of which 4.1% were vacant. The homeowner vacancy rate was 0.8% and the rental vacancy rate was 5.0%.

Racial composition as of the 2020 census
Race	Number	Percent
White	3,665	90.5%
Black or African American	71	1.8%
American Indian and Alaska Native	1	0.0%
Asian	100	2.5%
Native Hawaiian and Other Pacific Islander	0	0.0%
Some other race	11	0.3%
Two or more races	202	5.0%
Hispanic or Latino (of any race)	63	1.6%

=== 2000 census ===
As of the 2000 census, there were 3,018 people, 1,246 households, and 857 families residing in the CDP. The population density was 1,245.1 inhabitants per square mile (480.7/km^{2}). There were 1,284 housing units at an average density of 529.7 per square mile (204.5/km^{2}). The racial makeup of the CDP was 97.81% White, 0.53% African American, 0.20% Native American, 0.30% Asian, 0.03% Pacific Islander, 0.03% from other races, and 1.09% from two or more races. Hispanic or Latino of any race were 0.43% of the population.

There were 1,246 households, out of which 28.3% had children under the age of 18 living with them, 55.6% were married couples living together, 10.0% had a female householder with no husband present, and 31.2% were non-families. 26.8% of all households were made up of individuals, and 16.7% had someone living alone who was 65 years of age or older. The average household size was 2.42 and the average family size was 2.94.

In the CDP, the population was spread out, with 21.4% under the age of 18, 6.5% from 18 to 24, 27.3% from 25 to 44, 25.9% from 45 to 64, and 18.9% who were 65 years of age or older. The median age was 42 years. For every 100 females, there were 90.5 males. For every 100 females age 18 and over, there were 88.4 males.

The median income for a household in the CDP was $51,988, and the median income for a family was $61,951. Males had a median income of $40,391 versus $30,086 for females. The per capita income for the CDP was $23,277. About 0.4% of families and 1.3% of the population were below the poverty line, including none of those under age 18 and 1.8% of those age 65 or over.

== Schools ==
Wynantskill is served by the Wynantskill Union Free School District, home to the PK-8 Gardner-Dickinson School, but contains no high school. Most students from Wynantskill choose to attend high school at nearby Troy High School, in the Averill Park Central School District, but they can also attend Tamarac Secondary School in the Brunswick (Brittonkill) Central School District or Columbia High School in the East Greenbush Central School District. Students also have the option to attend Tech Valley High School or STEM High School (P-TECH).

In 2026, the community voted to reorganize the district with the Enlarged City School District of Troy in 2027. As a result, the district to presented a 0% tax levy increase to the 2026–2027 budget year.

== See also ==
- Kill (body of water)
