= Sharpe Homestead and Cemetery =

Historic house in New York, United States

- U.S. National Register of Historic Places
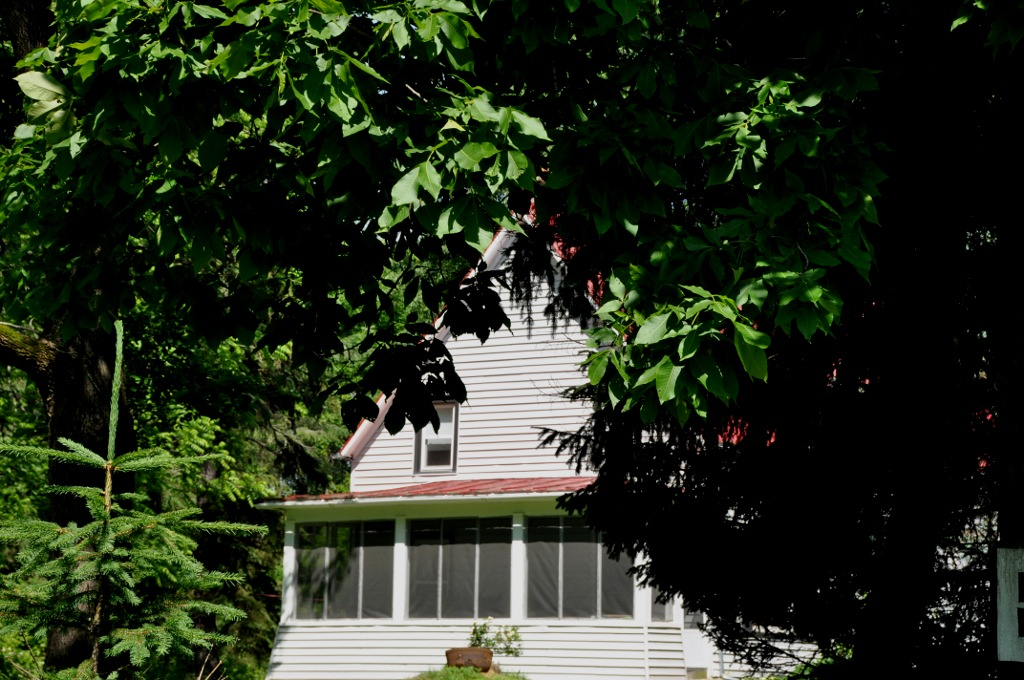

- Location within New York Location within the United States
- Location: 44 Laura Ln., Defreestville, New York
- Coordinates: 42°39′40″N 73°41′57″W
- Area: 1.5 acres (0.61 ha)
- Built: 1740
- Architectural style: Colonial
- NRHP reference No.: 05000440
- Added to NRHP: May 19, 2005

Sharpe Homestead and Cemetery is a historic home and cemetery located at Defreestville in Rensselaer County, New York. The house was built about 1740 and is a 1 1/2-story rectangular frame dwelling, 20 feet by 40 feet, topped by a steeply pitched gable roof covered with standing seam metal. It rests on a low fieldstone foundation. The family cemetery contains approximately a dozen stones marking the graves of the Sharpe and Barringer families.

It was listed on the National Register of Historic Places in 2005.
