= New York State Route 9J =

Highway in New York

New York State Route 9J
- Map of the Hudson Valley in eastern New York with NY 9J highlighted in red

Route information
- Auxiliary route of US 9
- Maintained by NYSDOT and the city of Rensselaer
- Length: 22.35 mi (35.97 km)
- Existed: 1930–present

Major junctions
- South end: US 9 in Stockport
- North end: US 9 / US 20 in Rensselaer

Location
- Country: United States
- State: New York
- Counties: Columbia, Rensselaer

Highway system
- New York Highways; Interstate; US; State; Reference; Parkways
← NY 9H	→ NY 9K

New York State Route 9J (NY 9J) is a north–south state highway in the Hudson Valley region of New York in the United States. It begins at an intersection with US 9 in the Columbia County town of Stockport and extends for 22.35 miles (35.97 km) to an interchange with US 9 and US 20 in the Rensselaer County city of Rensselaer. The route parallels the Hudson River for its entire length, and several parts of the highway run directly alongside the river. NY 9J was assigned to its current alignment as part of the 1930 renumbering of state highways in New York.

== Route description ==
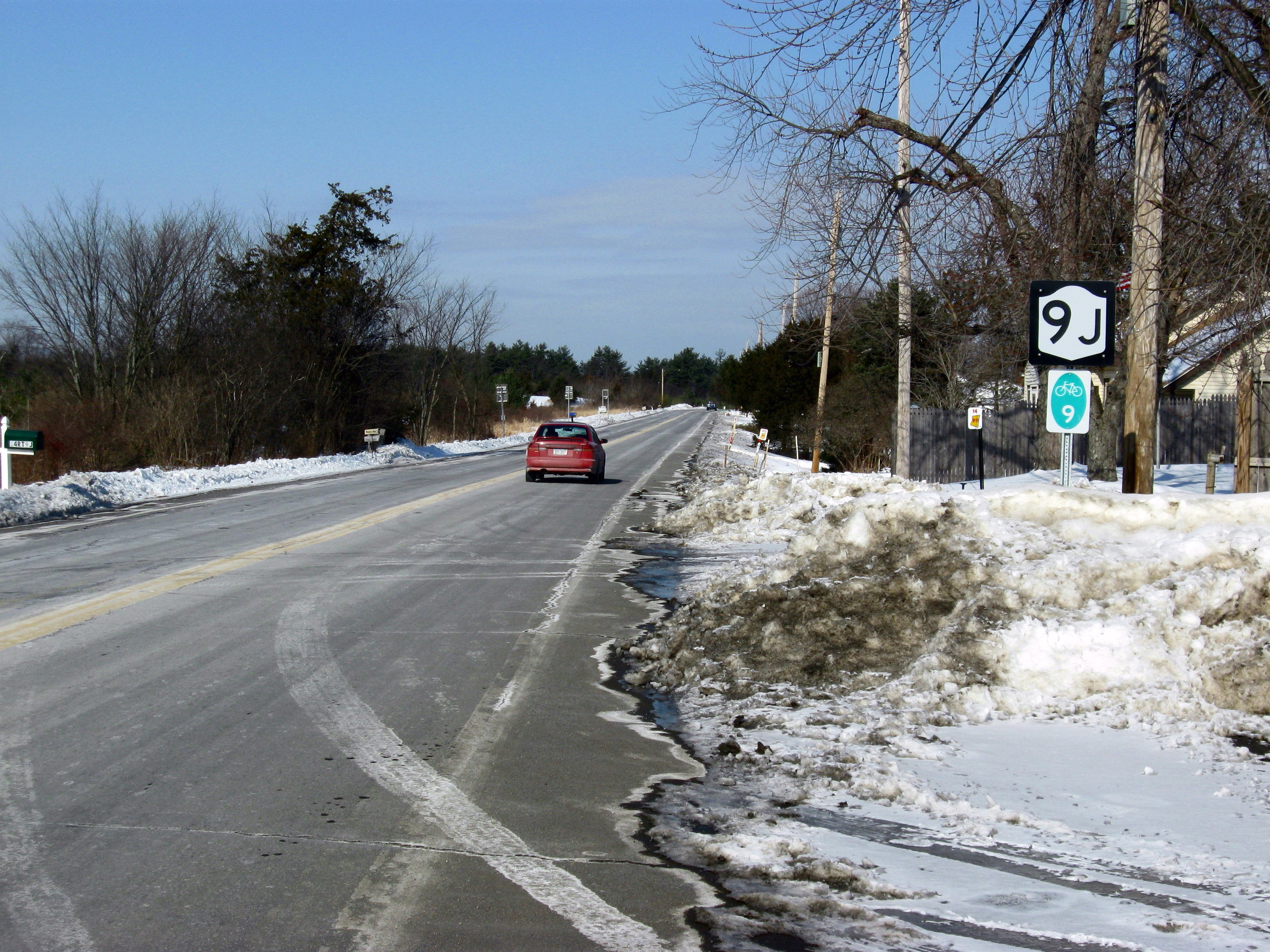
NY 9J proceeding northward from US 9 in Stockport

NY 9J begins at an intersection with US 9 in the hamlet of Columbiaville, located within the town of Stockport. The route proceeds northwest along a two-rural street that parallels US 9 until the intersection with Day Road, where it turns westward. Reaching the Amtrak and Norfolk Southern's Hudson Subdivision, NY 9J and the tracks begin a northward trek near the Hudson River, winding past a junction with County Route 46 (CR 46) in the town of Stuyvesant. Winding northward along the tracks, NY 9J reaches the hamlet of Stuyvesant, where it intersects with CR 26A (Kinderhook Street), a highway formerly designated as NY 398.

NY 9J continues north out of the hamlet of Stuyvesant, paralleling, crossing then paralleling a spur of the railroad tracks north of town. Retaining its northerly direction, the route parallels the Muitzes Kill and past Schodack Island State Park (composed of what was six islands now reduced to two). A short distance northward, NY 9J crosses into Rensselaer County and enters the town of Schodack. Immediately entering the hamlet of Schodack Landing, the route remains a two-lane residential street, crossing a junction with the western terminus of CR 2 (Schodack Landing Road). Just after crossing the intersection with Knickerboxer Road, NY 9J crosses under the New York State Thruway's Berkshire Thruway and the Castleton-on-Hudson Bridge.

Past the Thruway crossing, NY 9J turns northeast, crossing Muitzes Kill and intersecting CR 1 (Muitzes Kill Road) on the river's north bank. At this point, the road becomes known as South Main Street as bends northward into the village of Castleton-on-Hudson. Crossing north through the village, NY 9J parallels the Norfolk Southern tracks to an intersection with the western terminus of NY 150 (Scott Avenue). The route continues through Castleton-on-Hudson's northern portion as North Main Street before leaving the village for more rural areas along the banks of the Hudson River. It continues northeast along the riverbank as River Road to Stony Point, a small hamlet 1.5 miles (2.4 km) north of Castleton-on-Hudson, where the route connects to CR 8 (Stony Point Road).

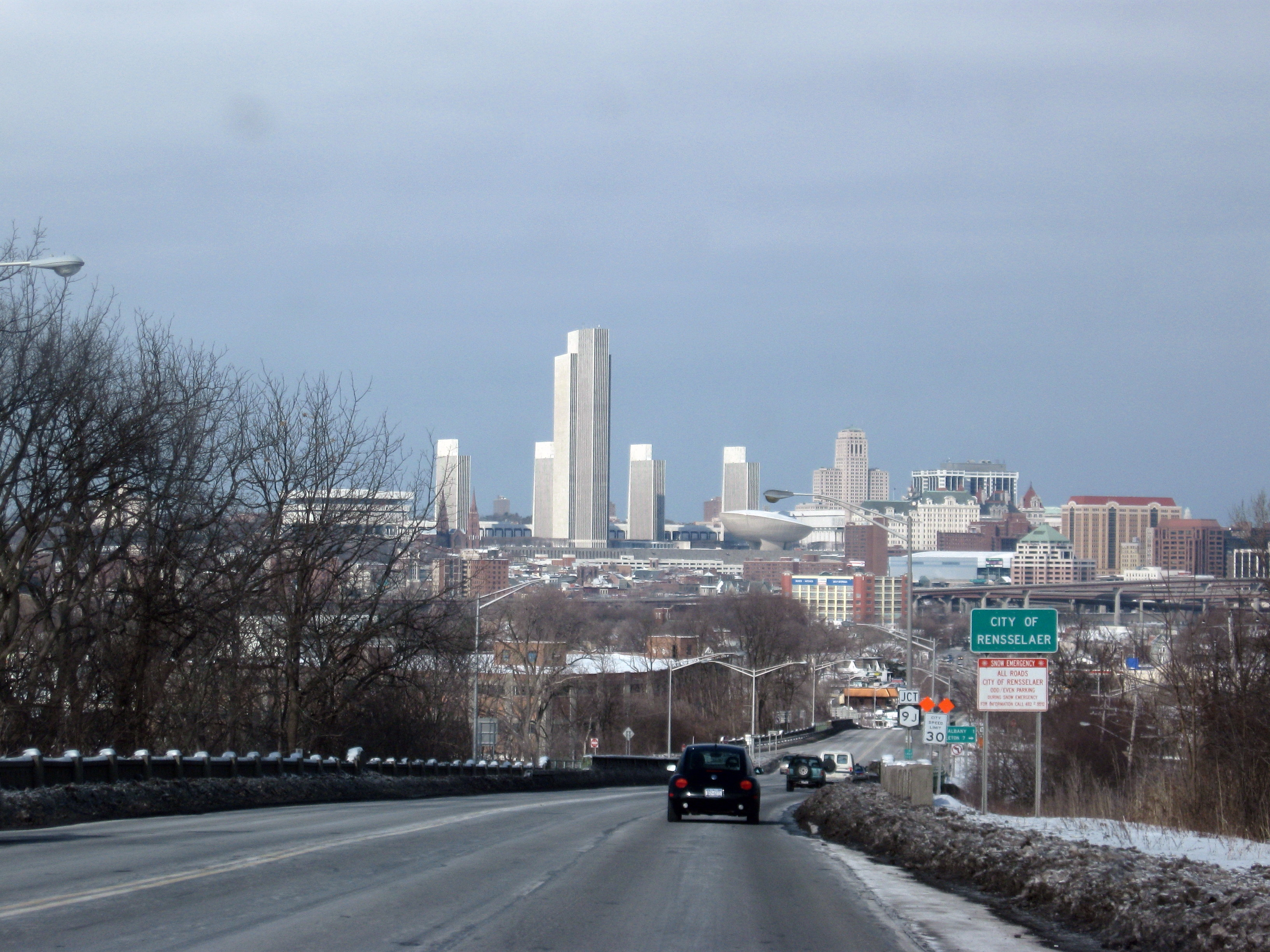
NY 9J's northern junction at US 9 and US 20 in Rensselaer.

Not far from Stony Point, the route crosses into the town of East Greenbush, a suburb of the city of Rensselaer. It intersects CR 58 (Hayes Road) in the southern part of town before heading into heavily industrialized areas near the southern edge of the Rensselaer city limits. The route passes east of an oil refinery for Sunoco as it enters Rensselaer, where NY 9J serves several other commercial and residential buildings along a stretch leading to an interchange with US 9 and US 20 (Columbia Turnpike). NY 9J feeds directly into the ramps to and from US 9 south and US 20 west while access to and from US 9 north and US 20 east is made by way of South Street, which connects to NY 9J just south of the interchange.

== History ==
The section of NY 9J between Muitzes Kill in Schodack and the Rensselaer city limits was improved to state highway standards as part of three separate projects carried out by the state of New York in the 1910s. Each project covered a different segment of the route, and all three parts of the highway were added to the state highway system in 1915. The portion within the town of Schodack was inventoried as State Highway 1116 (SH 1116) while the section in East Greenbush was listed as SH 1115. Both state highway numbers are unsigned. The state assumed maintenance of the river road from Muitzes Kill south to Stuyvesant by 1926 and an extension of the road southeast to Columbiaville in the late 1920s. In the 1930 renumbering of state highways in New York, the Columbiaville–Rensselaer riverside highway became part of NY 9J, a new route continuing north over locally maintained streets to US 9 and US 20 in Rensselaer.

== Major intersections ==
County	Location	mi	km	Destinations	Notes
Columbia	Town of Stockport	0.00	0.00	US 9 – Kinderhook	Southern terminus
Columbia	Stuyvesant	5.01	8.06	CR 26A – Kinderhook	Former NY 398
Rensselaer	Castleton-on-Hudson	15.21	24.48	NY 150 north (Scott Avenue)	Southern terminus of NY 150
Rensselaer	Rensselaer	22.35	35.97	US 9 / US 20 – Albany, Port of Rensselaer	Northern terminus; interchange
1.000 mi = 1.609 km; 1.000 km = 0.621 mi
