= New York State Route 915E =

Reference route in New York State

Coordinates: 42°38′39″N 73°42′24.5″W

New York State Route 915E
- Third Avenue Extension
- Map of Rensselaer County in eastern New York with NY 915E highlighted in red

Route information
- Maintained by NYSDOT
- Length: 1.67 mi (2.69 km)
- Existed: late 1990s–present

Major junctions
- West end: NY 151 in East Greenbush
- East end: US 4 in East Greenbush

Location
- Country: United States
- State: New York
- Counties: Rensselaer

Highway system
- New York Highways; Interstate; US; State; Reference; Parkways
← NY 380	NY 381	→ NY 382

New York State Route 915E (NY 915E) is an unsigned reference route designation for the Third Avenue Extension in East Greenbush, located in Rensselaer County, New York, in the United States. The east–west highway extends for 1.67 miles (2.69 km) from an intersection with NY 151 east of the Rensselaer city limits to a junction with U.S. Route 4 (US 4) south of the hamlet of Defreestville. NY 915E was designated as New York State Route 381 from the late 1930s to 1962 and part of NY 43 from that time to the late 1990s, when it gained its current designation.

== Route description ==
NY 915E begins just east of the Rensselaer city limits at the intersection of Third Avenue Extension and Barracks Road (NY 151) in the hamlet of Plaza View of the town of East Greenbush. NY 151 enters the intersection from the west on Third Avenue and exits to the south on Barracks Road while NY 915E heads to the northeast, paralleling a minor tributary of Mill Creek as it provides access to New Rural Cemetery and several residential housing tracts that lead away from the north side of the road. The land on the south side of Third Avenue Extension, however, is largely undeveloped. Roughly midway between NY 151 and US 4, the street passes under Interstate 90 (I-90).

East of the I-90 overpass, the development along NY 915E becomes more commercial and industrial in nature as the homes west of I-90 give way to warehouses east of the expressway. Unlike the homes, the warehouses occupy both sides of Third Avenue Extension. The highway continues eastward amidst the warehouses to US 4, where both Third Avenue Extension and NY 915E come to an end at a junction about 0.7 miles (1.1 km) south of the hamlet of Defreestville. Reference markers on Third Avenue and its extension still bear markings for NY 43, the street's former designation. These markers are present on both NY 915E and the segment re-designated NY 151. The marker in the infobox above illustrates the first marker falling on the portion designated as NY 915E.

== History ==
All of Third Avenue Extension between modern NY 151 and US 4 in East Greenbush, as well as Third Avenue, East Street, and 2nd Avenue to Broadway (then-US 9 and US 20) in Rensselaer, was designated as the westernmost portion of NY 152 in the 1930 renumbering of state highways in New York. NY 152 was truncated on its western end c. 1937 to US 4 in Defreestville. Its former routing into Rensselaer was redesignated as NY 381 by the following year; however, unlike NY 152, NY 381 was routed solely on Third Avenue and terminated at the intersection of Broadway (then NY 43) and Third Avenue.

NY 381 remained intact until 1962 when NY 43 was rerouted within the Rensselaer area to follow Third Avenue and Third Avenue Extension between the Hudson River and US 4, supplanting NY 381 in the process. NY 43 remained on Third Avenue until the late 1990s, when it was rerouted to meet I-90 at the new exit 8 west of Defreestville. After the re-routing of NY 43, NY 151 was extended westward from its former terminus at former NY 43, assuming Third Avenue from the downtown terminus to Barracks Road, its former terminus. The remaining portion of former NY 43 was redesignated NY 915E by the New York State Department of Transportation (NYSDOT).

== Major intersections ==
The entire route is in Rensselaer County.

Location	mi	km	Destinations	Notes
Plaza View	0.00	0.00	NY 151 (Barracks Road / 3rd Avenue)	Western terminus; former western terminus of NY 151
Town of East Greenbush	1.67	2.69	US 4 (Troy Road) – Troy, East Greenbush	Eastern terminus
1.000 mi = 1.609 km; 1.000 km = 0.621 mi
