= District School No. 3 (Castleton-on-Hudson, New York) =

- U.S. National Register of Historic Places
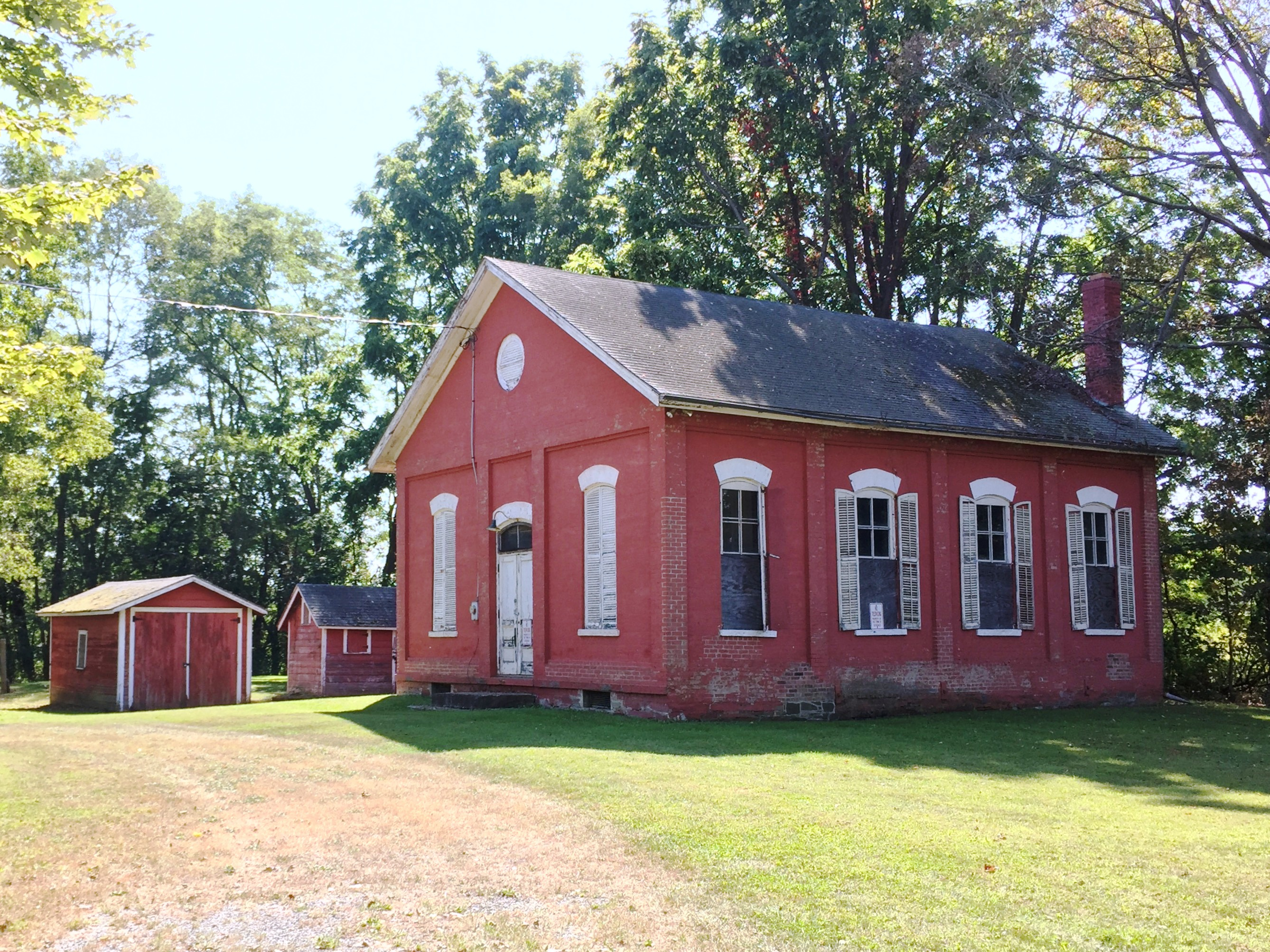

- Location within New York Location within the United States
- Location: 1125 S. Schodack Rd., Castleton-on-Hudson, New York
- Coordinates: 42°30′9″N 73°42′26″W
- Area: 0.6 acres (0.24 ha)
- Built: 1870
- Architectural style: Italianate
- NRHP reference No.: 98001116
- Added to NRHP: August 28, 1998

District School No. 3 is a historic one-room school building located at Castleton-on-Hudson in Rensselaer County, New York. It was built in 1870 and is a one-story, rectangular massed, brick building in the Italianate style. It remained in use as a school until 1951. Also on the property is a gable roofed garage (1931), a coal / wood shed, and a stone capped well.

It was listed on the National Register of Historic Places in 1998.
