= New York State Route 398 =

Former highway in New York

New York State Route 398
- Map of northern Columbia and Greene counties with NY 398 highlighted in red

Route information
- Maintained by NYSDOT
- Length: 3.05 mi (4.91 km)
- Existed: c. 1932–January 28, 1980

Major junctions
- West end: NY 9J in Stuyvesant
- East end: US 9 in Stuyvesant

Location
- Country: United States
- State: New York
- Counties: Columbia

Highway system
- New York Highways; Interstate; US; State; Reference; Parkways
← NY 397	→ NY 399

New York State Route 398 (NY 398) was an east–west state highway located within the town of Stuyvesant in Columbia County, New York, in the United States. It served as a short connector between NY 9J in the hamlet of Stuyvesant and U.S. Route 9 (US 9) in the hamlet of Sunnyside southwest of the village of Kinderhook. NY 398 was assigned in the early 1930s and remained unchanged until 1980, when ownership and maintenance of the highway was transferred to Columbia County. The route was redesignated as County Route 26A at that time.

== Route description ==
NY 398 began at an intersection with NY 9J in downtown Stuyvesant. The route progressed eastward, passing a small park and intersecting with local roads. NY 398 passed Firwood Barn as it climbed in elevation. The route turned to the southeast and passed some small parks. After that, the route became more rural, climbing even higher in elevation and intersecting with another local road.

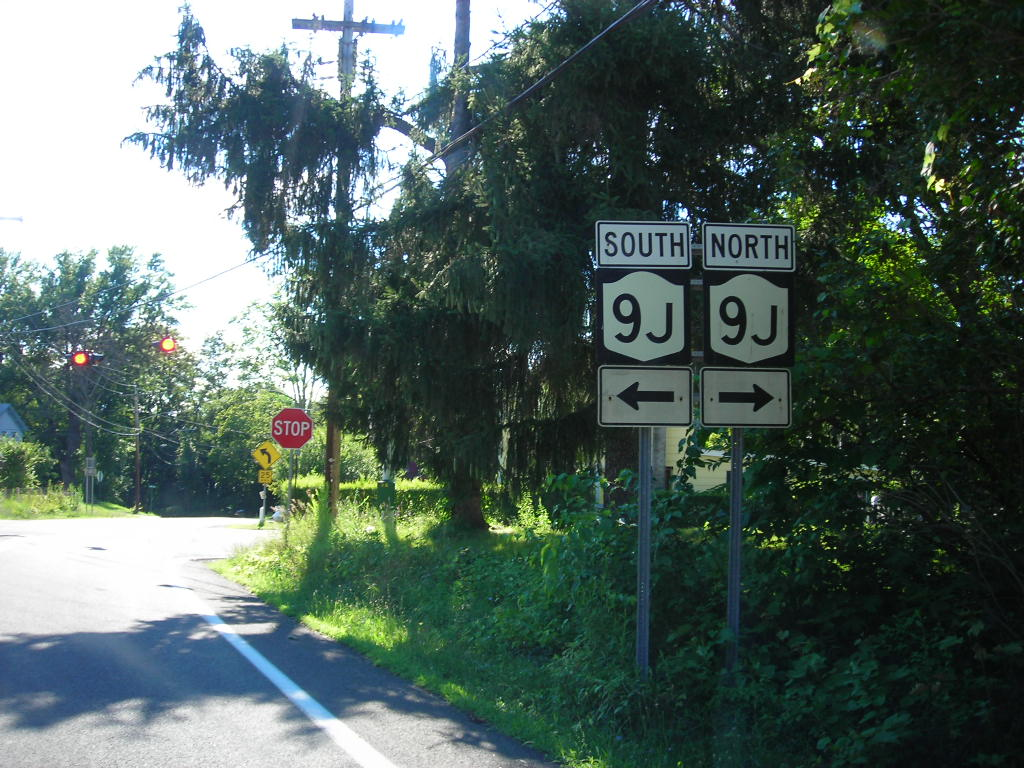
CR 26A at NY 9J in Stuyvesant. The old signage for NY 9J harken back to state-maintenance

After the local road however, the highway began to patch its way through several hills and mountains, but this did not last long. The highway then became rural again, emerging from the mountains behind it. There were a few short hills the rest of the way along NY 398, until it entered the small hamlet of Sunnyside. There, it became a little more suburbanized, and the highway terminated at an intersection with US 9.

== History ==
NY 398 was assigned c. 1932 to the highway connecting the hamlets of Stuyvesant and Sunnyside. It remained unchanged until January 28, 1980, when the NY 398 designation was officially removed from the highway. Ownership and maintenance of NY 398's former routing was transferred from the state of New York to Columbia County on April 1, 1980, as part of a highway maintenance swap between the two levels of government. The highway became part of County Route 26A (CR 26A), a designation that continues west of NY 9J to a junction with River View Street near the Hudson River.

== Major intersections ==
The entire route was in Stuyvesant, Columbia County.

mi	km	Destinations	Notes
0.00	0.00	NY 9J	Western terminus; hamlet of Stuyvesant
3.05	4.91	US 9	Eastern terminus; hamlet of Sunnyside
1.000 mi = 1.609 km; 1.000 km = 0.621 mi

== See also ==
- List of county routes in Columbia County, New York
- New York State Route 217, the other route affected by the 1980 Columbia County maintenance swap
