= New York State Route 382 =

Former highway in New York

New York State Route 382
- Map of the Red House area with NY 382 at center

Route information
- Maintained by NYSDOT
- Length: 0.8 mi (1,300 m)
- Existed: c. 1932–early 1970s

Major junctions
- West end: NY 17 in Red House
- East end: Allegany State Park entrance in Red House

Location
- Country: United States
- State: New York
- Counties: Cattaraugus

Highway system
- New York Highways; Interstate; US; State; Reference; Parkways
← NY 381	→ NY 383

New York State Route 382 (NY 382) was a state highway in the town of Red House in Cattaraugus County, New York, in the United States. The highway was 0.8 miles (1.3 km) long and served as a connector between NY 17 and the Red House entrance of Allegany State Park, where it connected to Allegany State Park Route 2 (ASP Route 2). NY 382 was assigned in the early 1930s and removed in the early 1970s after the highway's connection to the park was dismantled, and the hamlet it served evacuated, as part of the Southern Tier Expressway's construction. The NY 382 designation is currently reserved by the New York State Department of Transportation as a replacement for NY 88 in Ontario and Wayne counties.

== Route description ==
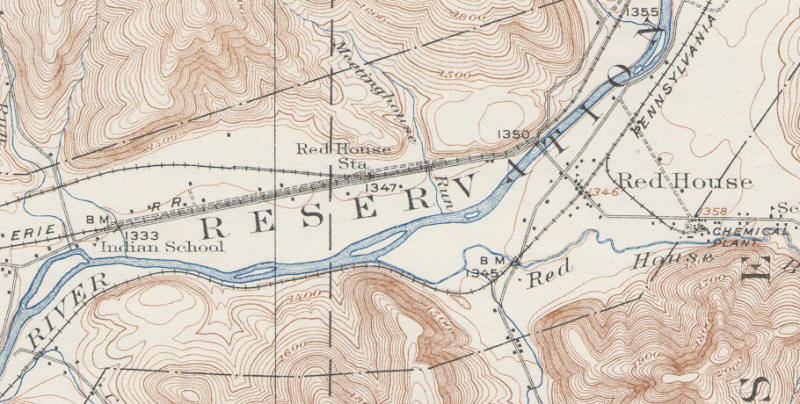
A 1923 United States Geological Survey topographic map of Red House. The east–west highway linking the hamlet of Red House to Allegany State Park was what became NY 382

The western terminus of NY 382 was at an intersection with Bay State Road and NY 17 in the now abandoned hamlet of Red House, located 5 miles (8.0 km) southwest of the city of Salamanca in the town of Red House. At the time, NY 17 was routed along an at-grade highway that paralleled the future routing of the Southern Tier Expressway to the north and west. NY 382 headed southeast from the junction, passing through the center of what was then the hamlet of Red House before turning eastward ahead of Red House Brook, a small stream that branched off the nearby Allegheny River. NY 382 paralleled Red House Brook east to the Allegany State Park boundary, where the NY 382 designation ended and the highway continued east as Allegany State Park Route 2.

== History ==
NY 382 was assigned c. 1932 to a short roadway linking NY 17 to an entrance to Allegany State Park in Red House.

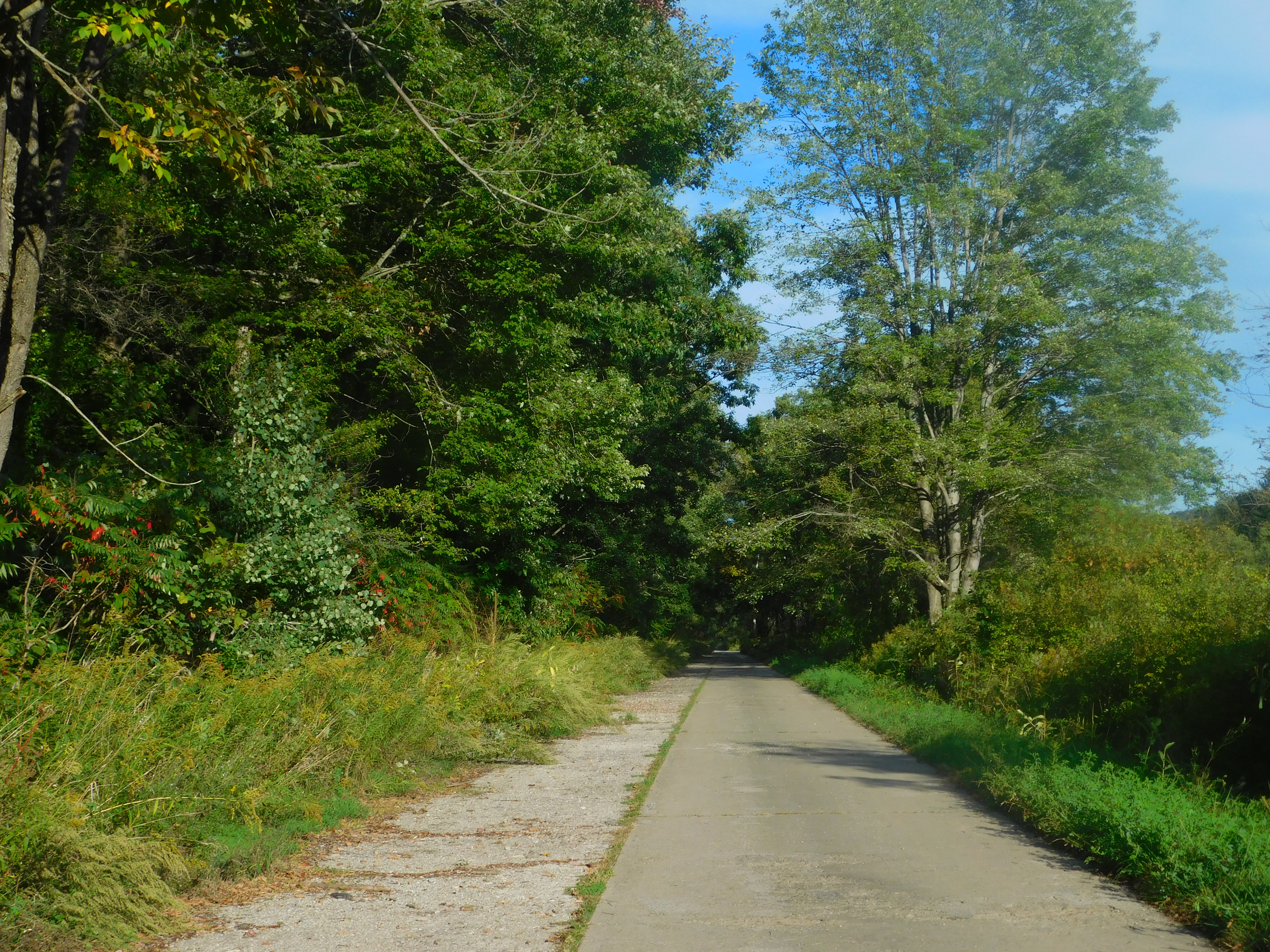
The former alignment of NY 382 in Red House in September 2018

The route remained intact until the construction of the Southern Tier Expressway (STE) through Red House in the late 1960s and early 1970s. Unwanted tourism in Jimerson Town, a newly built settlement northeast of Red House, prompted Seneca leaders to seek ways to reduce through traffic in the settlement; to do so, the state built a trumpet interchange off the expressway where NY 382 used to be, which, coupled with the flooding of the roadway of old Route 17 to the west, effectively cut Jimerson Town off from the highway system. The construction of the highway also allowed the state to claim eminent domain over most of the hamlet of Red House, leading to the hamlet's destruction; the few remaining private residences in the town as of 2015 are located southwest of what was Route 382. When the interchange at exit 19 of the STE was constructed c. 1970, NY 382 was disconnected from Allegany State Park Route 2, which was realigned to meet the new exit (as was Bay State Road, much of which was moved to a route south of and parallel to the expressway). The NY 382 designation was removed around this time as a result. The roadway still runs from the former NY 17 (now NY 951T, which terminates near the former NY 382's end at a dilapidated bridge) to the Exit 19 on/off ramp, but due to safety concerns, the road was blocked off at its eastern terminus.

The former NY 382 was reopened in August 2014 after a washout on old NY 17 left several households unable to reach Salamanca.

The NY 382 designation is reserved by the New York State Department of Transportation for future use along what is now NY 88 in the Finger Lakes region of New York. Currently, NY 88 has the same numerical designation as Interstate 88, an Interstate Highway in eastern New York.

== Major intersections ==
The entire route was in Red House, Cattaraugus County.

mi	km	Destinations	Notes
0.0	0.0	NY 17 / CR 43	Western terminus
0.8	1.3	Allegany State Park	Continues as Allegany State Park Route 2
1.000 mi = 1.609 km; 1.000 km = 0.621 mi
