= Castleton-on-Hudson, New York =

Castleton-on-Hudson
- Village
- Location in Rensselaer County and the state of New York.

- Location within the state of New York
- Coordinates: 42°31′57″N 73°45′1″W
- Country: United States
- State: New York
- County: Rensselaer

Government
  - Mayor: Michael S. Slik

Area
  - Total: 0.71 sq mi (1.85 km^{2})
  - Land: 0.71 sq mi (1.85 km^{2})
  - Water: 0 sq mi (0.00 km^{2})
- Elevation: 151 ft (46 m)

Population (2020)
  - Total: 1,477
  - Density: 2,069.7/sq mi (799.11/km^{2})
- Time zone: UTC-5 (Eastern (EST))
  - Summer (DST): UTC-4 (EDT)
- ZIP code: 12033
- Area code: 518
- FIPS code: 36-12870
- GNIS feature ID: 0969967
- Website: www.castleton-on-hudson.org

Castleton-on-Hudson is a village located in the southwestern part of the town of Schodack in Rensselaer County, New York, United States. As of the 2020 census, Castleton-on-Hudson had a population of 1,477. The village is southeast of Albany.

== History ==
Castleton gets its name from the exploration of the North (Hudson) River by Henry Hudson. While traveling up the river, he came upon a Mahican Indian village noted for a large structure located on a rise above the river. This structure was a storehouse for foodstuffs, but was of such size that it was thought to be a "castle". Another theory for the derivation of the name "Castleton" comes from Rutherford Hayner's Troy and Rensselaer County New York: A History (1925). Hayner states "Although the exact location of this landing of Hudson's has been more or less conjectural, the weight of opinion places it at or near the present site of the village of Castleton, for on Castle Hill, back of the village, stood the dwelling of the chief of the Mohicans."

The area of Castleton was settled in 1792. When the small village was incorporated into Rensselaer County on April 13, 1827, there were about 100 people living in the area, mostly along the banks of the river. Between 1890 and 1920, the village had a booming economy, with small industry, a hotel, and a small port to gain access to river traffic. However, a large flood destroyed much of the business district in 1936, and the industry took the opportunity to relocate. These days the town is a very residential suburb, with some light agriculture.

The name of the village was changed from Castleton to Castleton-on-Hudson in 1927.

The Gazetteer of the State of New York of 1860 reports that Castleton was formerly known as Morriches Hastie. (JH French, 1860)

The District School No. 3 and Joachim Staats House and Gerrit Staats Ruin are listed on the National Register of Historic Places.

== Geography ==
According to the United States Census Bureau, the village has a total area of 0.8 square miles (2.1 km^{2}), all land.

The village is on the east bank of the Hudson River.

== Demographics ==
Historical population
Census	Pop.	Note	%±
1870	580		—
1880	912		57.2%
1890	1,127		23.6%
1900	1,214		7.7%
1910	1,396		15.0%
1920	1,595		14.3%
1930	1,506		−5.6%
1940	1,515		0.6%
1950	1,751		15.6%
1960	1,752		0.1%
1970	1,730		−1.3%
1980	1,627		−6.0%
1990	1,491		−8.4%
2000	1,619		8.6%
2010	1,473		−9.0%
2020	1,477		0.3%
U.S. Decennial Census

As of the census of 2000, there were 1,619 people, 615 households, and 399 families residing in the village. The population density was 2,025.5 inhabitants per square mile (782.0/km^{2}). There were 654 housing units at an average density of 818.2 units per square mile (315.9 units/km^{2}). The racial makeup of the village was 96.79% White, 1.36% African American, 0.25% Asian, 0.93% from other races, and 0.68% from two or more races. Hispanic or Latino of any race were 1.79% of the population.

There were 615 households, out of which 35.4% had children under the age of 18 living with them, 45.0% were married couples living together, 15.9% had a female householder with no husband present, and 35.1% were non-families. 29.6% of all households were made up of individuals, and 15.0% had someone living alone who was 65 years of age or older. The average household size was 2.46 and the average family size was 3.06.

In the village, the population was spread out, with 27.1% under the age of 18, 6.4% from 18 to 24, 28.3% from 25 to 44, 19.1% from 45 to 64, and 19.0% who were 65 years of age or older. The median age was 38 years. For every 100 females, there were 83.1 males. For every 100 females age 18 and over, there were 73.0 males.

The median income for a household in the village was $44,141, and the median income for a family was $51,957. Males had a median income of $36,019 versus $26,976 for females. The per capita income for the village was $18,660. About 2.5% of families and 8.7% of the population were below the poverty line, including 9.3% of those under age 18 and 10.8% of those age 65 or over.

== Notable people ==
- James L. Hogeboom: Christian Rieseberg-nonprofit leader
- Jaime Schultz: baseball player
- J. Victor Skiff: environmental conservationist and public servant.
