= New York State Route 43 =

State highway in Rensselaer County, New York, US

New York State Route 43
- Map of the Albany area with NY 43 highlighted in red

Route information
- Maintained by NYSDOT
- Length: 24.00 mi (38.62 km)
- Existed: mid-1920s–present

Major junctions
- West end: I-90 in North Greenbush
- US 4 in North Greenbush; NY 66 in Sand Lake; NY 22 in Stephentown
- East end: Route 43 at the Massachusetts state line in Stephentown

Location
- Country: United States
- State: New York
- Counties: Rensselaer

Highway system
- New York Highways; Interstate; US; State; Reference; Parkways
← NY 42	→ US 44

New York State Route 43 (NY 43) is a state highway in Rensselaer County, New York, in the United States. It extends for 24.00 miles (38.62 km) from Interstate 90 (I-90) exit 8 in North Greenbush to the Massachusetts state line, where it continues into Williamstown as Massachusetts Route 43. Most of NY 43 is a two-lane highway that passes through a mixture of rural and residential areas; however, its westernmost mile is a four-lane freeway. NY 43 has an overlap with NY 66 in Sand Lake and intersects NY 22 in Stephentown.

When NY 43 was first assigned in the 1920s, it began near the village of Schoharie and ended in downtown Albany. Initially, the portion of modern NY 43 east of Averill Park was designated as part of New York State Route 7 in 1924. It was renumbered to New York State Route 45 by 1926 and became part of an extended NY 43 as part of the 1930 renumbering of state highways in New York. NY 43 was originally routed on Broadway and Washington Avenue in Rensselaer; however, it was rerouted to use 3rd Avenue and US 4 instead in the late 1960s.

In the early 1970s, the route was truncated to consist only of the portion east of the Hudson River. NY 43's former routing west to Schoharie was redesignated NY 443 as a result. NY 43 was realigned slightly in the late 1990s to serve the new exit 8 on I-90. Its former routing into Rensselaer on 3rd Avenue is now partly NY 151 and unsigned NY 915E.

== Route description ==
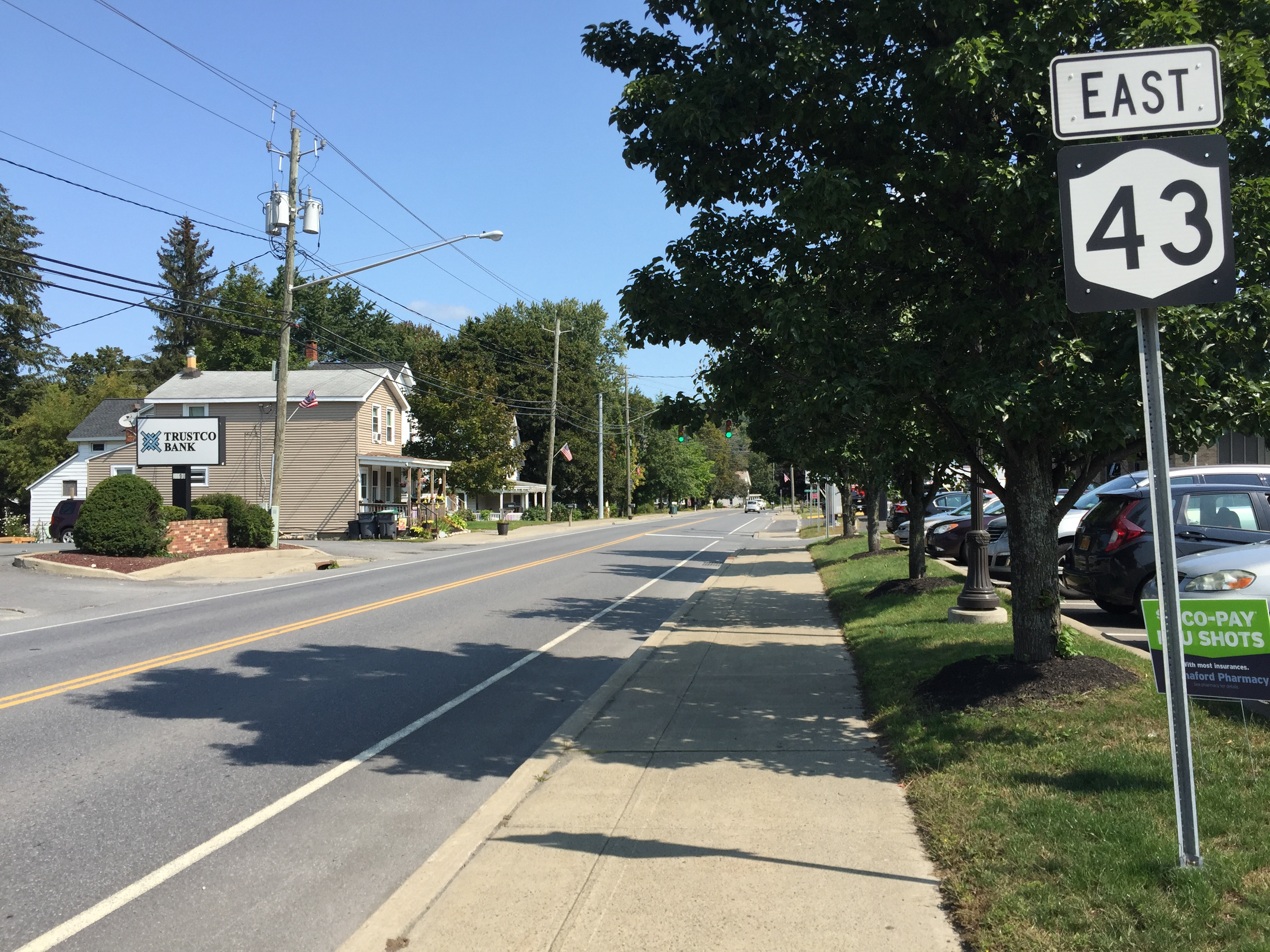
View east along NY 43 in West Sand Lake

NY 43 begins at an interchange with I-90 (exit 8) in the town of North Greenbush in western Rensselaer County. The route heads northeastward as a four-lane freeway through a small forest separating NY 43 from a pair of residential neighborhoods. NY 43 provides access to these neighborhoods at an intersection with Washington Avenue, where it becomes a four-lane surface road. Past this junction, the highway turns eastward to meet US 4 in the hamlet of Defreestville. NY 43 narrows to two lanes roughly 0.25 miles (0.40 km) east of US 4 and continues eastward through a densely populated area of North Greenbush.

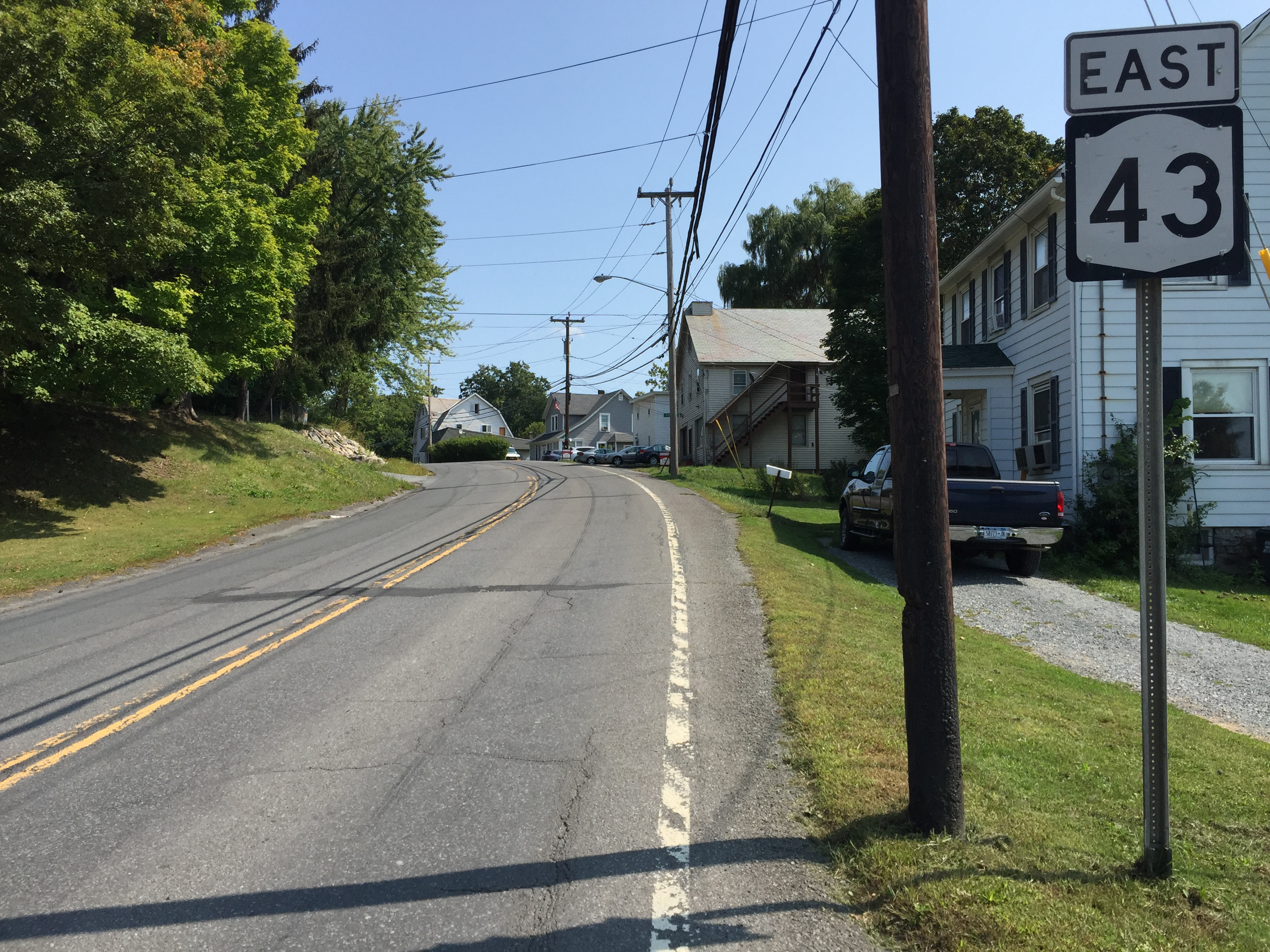
View east along NY 43 in Averill Park

East of Lape Road (County Route 66 or CR 66), the amount of development along NY 43 begins to decline and give way to small, open fields located amongst forested areas. However, as NY 43 enters the town of Sand Lake, the number of homes and businesses on the highway rises once more. The level of development reaches its greatest point in West Sand Lake, a community centered around NY 43's junction with NY 150. NY 43 continues on, passing through residential areas of Sand Lake as it intersects NY 351 and heads eastward to Averill Park. The route meets NY 66 east of the community, and the two routes overlap for 3 miles (5 km) southeastward along the eastern shores of the small Glass and Crooked Lakes. NY 43 and NY 66 split just after crossing into the town of Nassau near the southern edge of Crooked Lake.

NY 43 heads southeastward from NY 66, passing through mostly rural, forested areas as it proceeds toward the Massachusetts state line. Most of the development along the final stretch of the route is concentrated in the small communities along the route. It passes through Dunham Hollow and enters the town of Stephentown as it serves the hamlet of West Stephentown. NY 43 continues through forested areas of Stephentown to Stephentown Center, denoted by a cluster of homes near the intersection of NY 43 and Newton Road.

From Stephentown Center, the route heads southeast to the community of Stephentown situated 2 miles (3.2 km) west of the state line. NY 43 serves as the main commercial strip through the hamlet, which is the largest location on the route since Averill Park. Here, NY 43 intersects NY 22 at a junction that features sharp corners for commuters turning onto NY 43 from NY 22. Past NY 22, NY 43 heads southeast through mostly open fields and lightly populated areas to the Massachusetts state line, where the roadway becomes Route 43 upon crossing into Hancock, Massachusetts.

== History ==
=== Origins and designation ===
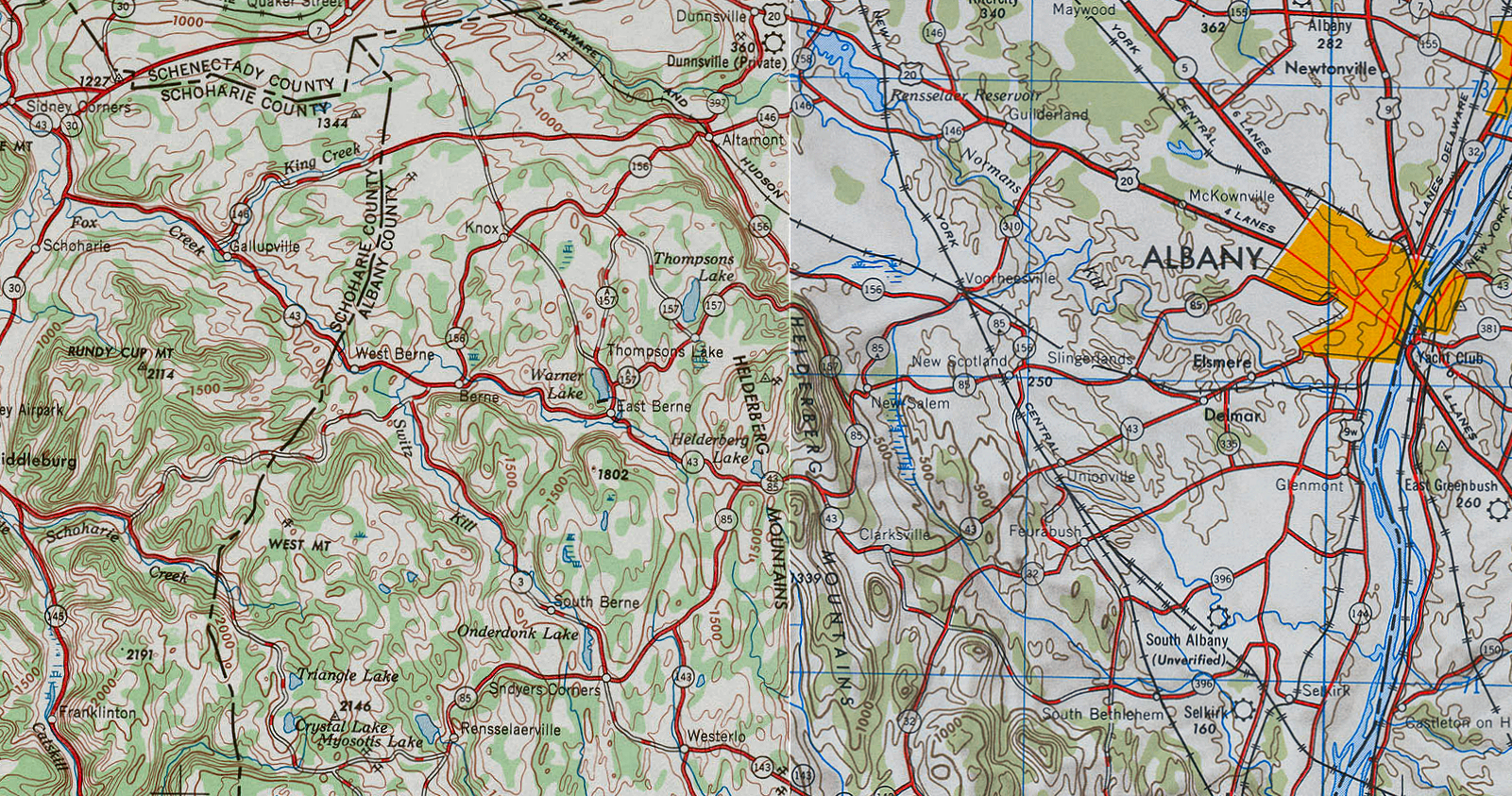
Late 1940s map of NY 43's former routing west of Albany

In 1908, the New York State Legislature created a system of unsigned legislative routes across the state of New York. Two of the routes created at this time were Route 7, which extended from the Pennsylvania state line south of Binghamton to Albany via Oneonta, Cobleskill, Berne, and New Scotland, and Route 24, a highway extending from the east bank of the Hudson River in Rensselaer to the Massachusetts state line near Mount Lebanon by way of Averill Park and Nassau. In the vicinity of Rensselaer, Route 21 was routed on 3rd Avenue, 3rd Avenue Extension, North Greenbush Road, and West Sand Lake Road.

When the first set of posted routes in New York were assigned in 1924, a highway connecting Route 21 in Averill Park to the Massachusetts state line at Stephentown was designated as part of NY 7, a route that continued northwest from Averill Park to Troy on modern NY 66. By 1926, the portion of old legislative Route 7 from Central Bridge to East Berne was designated as part of NY 43, a new route extending from Central Bridge to downtown Albany via East Berne, Clarksville, and Delmar, while NY 7 was renumbered to NY 45.

=== Changes in routing ===
In the 1930 renumbering of state highways in New York, NY 43 was truncated slightly on its western end to begin at a junction with the new NY 30 north of Schoharie. Meanwhile, NY 45 was reassigned to another highway in Orange County. The portion of former NY 45 from Troy to Averill Park became part of NY 66 while the remainder became an eastward extension of NY 43. The extended NY 43 was now concurrent with US 9 and US 20 along Madison Avenue from Delaware Avenue to Rensselaer, where it followed Broadway and Washington Avenue to US 4 in Defreestville. The route continued east to Averill Park on what had been legislative Route 21.

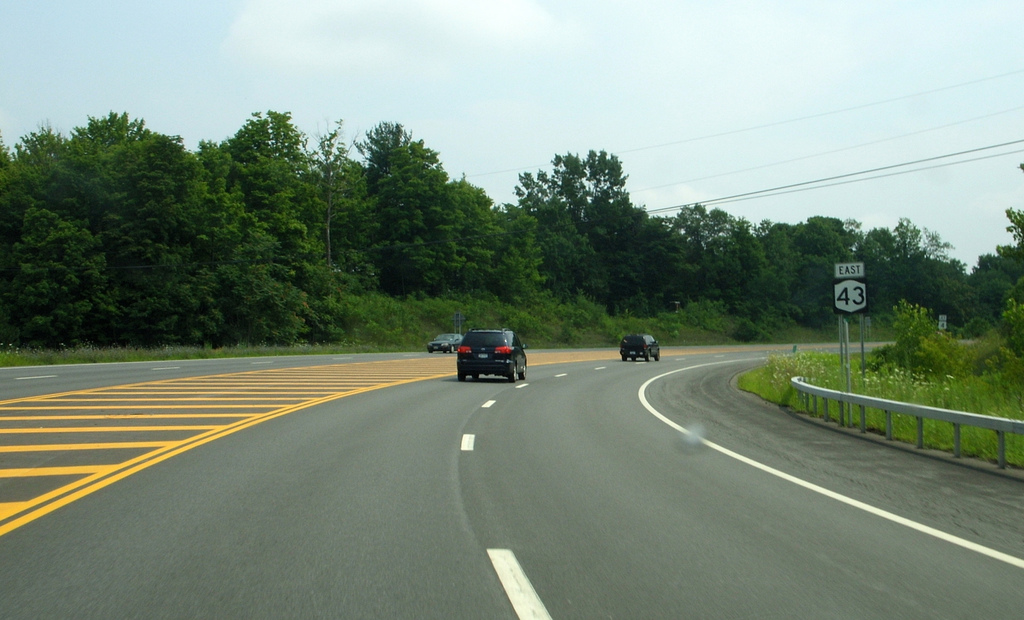
Approaching US 4 on NY 43 eastbound in North Greenbush

NY 43 was extended slightly following the construction of a new alignment for NY 30 near Central Bridge in the early 1940s. NY 30 now left its old alignment southeast of Central Bridge and bypassed the community to the east. The former routing of NY 30 into Central Bridge became an extension of NY 43, which overlapped NY 30 between the new alignment and Schoharie. When NY 30A replaced NY 148 in 1960, the short piece of NY 43 near Central Bridge became part of NY 30A and NY 43 was truncated back to NY 30 near Schoharie. In the late 1960s, NY 43 was rerouted through downtown Rensselaer to follow 3rd Avenue (previously NY 381) east to US 4. From there, NY 43 overlapped US 4 northward to Defreestville, where it rejoined its previous alignment.

NY 43 was truncated on its western end to the junction of 3rd Avenue and Broadway in downtown Rensselaer in the early 1970s, eliminating the overlap with US 9 and US 20 through Albany. Its former routing from Schoharie to Albany was renumbered to NY 443. NY 43 remained on 3rd Avenue up to the late 1990s when it was rerouted to follow a new highway to I-90 exit 8 west of Defreestville. The realignment eliminated the overlap with US 4 and also took NY 43 outside of the Rensselaer city limits for the first time since being extended across the Hudson River in 1930. The former alignment of NY 43 along 3rd Avenue from Broadway to Barracks Road became part of NY 151; the remainder was designated NY 915E, an unsigned reference route.

== Major intersections ==
The entire route is in Rensselaer County.

Location	mi	km	Destinations	Notes
Town of North Greenbush	0.00	0.00	I-90 – Albany, Boston	Western terminus; exit 8 on I-90
Town of North Greenbush			Eastern end of freeway section	
Town of North Greenbush	1.85	2.98	US 4 – Troy, East Greenbush	Hamlet of Defreestville
Town of Sand Lake	6.59	10.61	NY 150	Hamlet of West Sand Lake
Town of Sand Lake	7.25	11.67	NY 351 north – Poestenkill	Southern terminus of NY 351
Town of Sand Lake	10.44	16.80	NY 66 north / CR 42 east	Western end of NY 66 concurrency; western terminus of CR 42; hamlet of Sand Lake
Town of Nassau	13.40	21.57	NY 66 south – East Nassau	Eastern end of NY 66 concurrency
Stephentown	22.45	36.13	To NY 22	Access via Provost Road
Stephentown	24.00	38.62	Route 43 east – Williamstown	Continuation into Massachusetts
1.000 mi = 1.609 km; 1.000 km = 0.621 mi: Concurrency terminus
