= North Greenbush, New York =

North Greenbush
- Town
- Town of North Greenbush
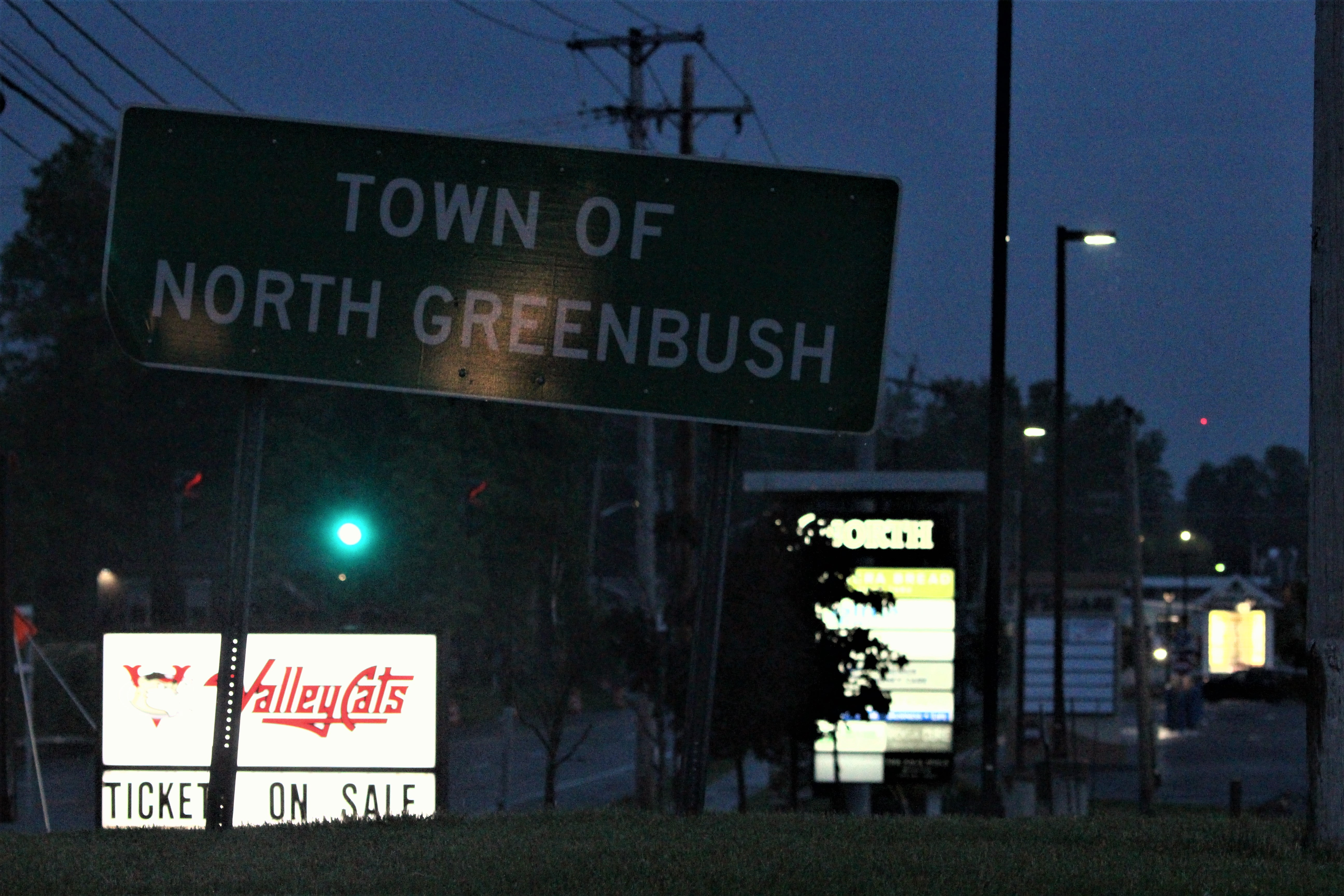
- Town of North Greenbush, New York sign on Vanderburgh Avenue.
- Etymology: From being the northern half of the old town of Greenbush; Greenbush from the Dutch Greenen Bosch, meaning "pinewood" for the pine forests of the area
- Location in Rensselaer County and the state of New York.

- Location of New York in the United States
- Coordinates: 42°40′30″N 73°39′29″W
- Country: United States
- State: New York
- County: Rensselaer
- Incorporation as town: 1855

Area
  - Total: 18.91 sq mi (48.97 km^{2})
  - Land: 18.54 sq mi (48.03 km^{2})
  - Water: 0.36 sq mi (0.94 km^{2})
- Elevation: 531 ft (162 m)
- Lowest elevation: 0 ft (0 m)

Population (2020)
  - Total: 13,929
  - Density: 740/sq mi (284/km^{2})
- Time zone: UTC−5 (EST)
  - Summer (DST): UTC−4 (EDT)
- ZIP Codes: 12144, 12180, 12198
- Area codes: 518, 838
- FIPS code: 36-083-52100
- FIPS code: 36-52100
- GNIS feature ID: 0979287
- Wikimedia Commons: North Greenbush, New York
- Website: Town of North Greenbush

North Greenbush is a town in Rensselaer County, New York, United States. North Greenbush is located in the western part of the county. The population was 13,292 at the 2020 census.

The town has three main hamlets, Wynantskill in the northeastern corner, Defreestville in the southern portion of the town, and Snyder's Lake which occupies the majority of the town's eastern end. Each have strong identities and hinder efforts by the town to have a centralized identity. Also hindering a unified town image is that North Greenbush consists of parts of four different school districts, only one of which (a one-room schoolhouse) carries the town's name; two fire departments (Wynantskill and Defreestville); and three ZIP Codes (City of Troy, City of Rensselaer, and Wynantskill). North Greenbush is home to the southern part of the Hudson Valley Community College (HVCC) campus, including the Joseph L. Bruno Stadium, home to the Tri-City ValleyCats minor league baseball team; the RPI Tech Park; the La Salle Institute; the New York State National Guard Armory, headquarters for the Rainbow Division; and various Rensselaer County government institutions.

== History ==
North Greenbush was part of the Manor of Rensselaerswyck and Albany County prior to Rensselaer County's creation in 1791. North Greenbush was created on February 23, 1855, from the town of Greenbush at the same time as the town of Clinton (today East Greenbush). At this time, North Greenbush occupied more than what it does today; it also covered what is now the northern section of the city of Rensselaer and the southern section of the city of Troy.

The earliest settlers, in the early 1620s, settled in Bath, a part of the town annexed to Rensselaer in 1902. Some settlement in what is today North Greenbush may have taken place in the 17th century as well, but most significant early settlement occurred just prior to the Revolutionary War. Early settlements in the town were at Bath, Wynantskill, and Defreestville. In 1874, Bath became incorporated as a village, and in 1902 it was annexed to Rensselaer. Wynantskill, in the northeastern corner of the town, was first settled around the end of the 18th century, with a Dutch Reformed Church established c. 1794 and a post office established in 1820. Defreestville was originally called Blooming Grove until approximately 1830, when it was changed due to confusion with another Blooming Grove, in Orange County. It was named Defreestville for David M. De Freest and family who owned a tavern there. Defreestville and Wynantskill continue to be important hamlets in the town. Snyders Lake also became an important community in the 20th century. Snyders Lake was composed of summer residences and continues to lack a central business district.

During the 20th century, North Greenbush began to see more development due to an improved transportation infrastructure which led to increased suburban residential, office, and retail growth based on the automobile. In 1931, the road between Troy and East Greenbush was widened and the right-of-way was straightened as US Route 4. The older, narrower, winding residential parts of the road were bypassed and is today's Bloomingrove Drive. Starting in the 1940s and 1950s, suburban growth along Route 4 began to displace farms and local businesses with national chains with an automobile oriented pattern of growth. This suburban growth was encouraged by the construction of Interstate 90 (I-90) and the Patroon Island Bridge in the 1960s, making North Greenbush an easy commute to Albany. I-90 did not have a direct exit to North Greenbush until 1996, when Exit 8 was constructed connecting US 4 and NY Route 43 to the interstate. In the 1970s, Rensselaer Polytechnic Institute (RPI) began developing the RPI Tech Park on Route 4 as a business incubator. Today, it has over 1,000,000 square feet (93,000 m^{2}) of office space. A connector highway was planned, extending from Exit 8 parallel to US 4 north through the RPI Tech Park and meeting US 4 near Hudson Valley Community College (HVCC) at the Troy city line.

In the late 1990s, the RPI Tech Park became the focus of regional and statewide push to get a chip fabrication factory (chip fab plant) built. The RPI Tech Park site originally met little opposition from the town. But as time progressed, opposition grew in response to concerns about potential impacts on traffic and the environment. The RPI Tech Park site, which by October 1999 was one of only nine sites still being marketed by the state, was terminated when the North Greenbush town council voted to terminate the review process. Another instance of local opposition to development occurred after the construction of I-90's Exit 8 when that location became well-primed for commercial development. Local developer Frank Nigro, with Nigro Company, proposed a high-end shopping center for the northeastern corner of the intersection of routes 4 and 43. This led to lawsuits and a failed push by residents of Defreestville to incorporate as a village in order to stop the development and a counter-move by the developer and certain landowners to attempt annexation to the neighboring city of Rensselaer, where the development would be better received.

The Defreest Homestead was listed on the National Register of Historic Places in 1977.

== Geography ==
According to the United States Census Bureau, the town has a total area of 19.0 square miles (49 km^{2}), of which 18.7 square miles (48 km^{2}) is land and 0.3 square miles (0.78 km^{2}) (1.74%) is water. The western section of the town is steeply sloped and cut by various ravines; the clay bluffs rise between 100 and 200 feet (61 m) above the river with little to no flood plain. The central and eastern parts consist of more gently rolling hills and valleys. The Hudson River is the river of the town, though it is inaccessible to the public at this time; the Wynants Kill in the northeastern section is a creek of some respectable size. Snyder's Lake near the eastern border is the largest lake in the town and is accessible to the public.

The west town line is marked by the Hudson River with Albany County on the opposite shore. The city of Albany shares a brief common border with the town, the rest of the western boundary in the Hudson River is shared with the village of Menands within the town of Colonie. To the north is Troy and the town of Brunswick with the towns of Poestenkill and Sand Lake to the east. Most of the southern border is shared with East Greenbush, while the city of Rensselaer's northern section is partially surrounded by North Greenbush in the town's southwestern corner.

== Demographics ==
Historical population
Census	Pop.	Note	%±
1860	2,170		—
1870	3,058		40.9%
1880	4,131		35.1%
1890	4,768		15.4%
1900	4,719		−1.0%
1910	1,293		−72.6%
1920	1,425		10.2%
1930	2,215		55.4%
1940	3,223		45.5%
1950	4,913		52.4%
1960	8,161		66.1%
1970	10,513		28.8%
1980	10,396		−1.1%
1990	10,891		4.8%
2000	10,805		−0.8%
2010	12,075		11.8%
2020	13,929		15.4%
U.S. Decennial Census

As of the census of 2000, there were 10,805 people, 4,161 households, and 2,916 families residing in the town. The population density was 578.0 inhabitants per square mile (223.2/km^{2}). There were 4,336 housing units at an average density of 232.0 per square mile (89.6/km^{2}). The racial makeup of the town was 96.81% White, 1.01% African American, 0.09% Native American, 0.76% Asian, 0.01% Pacific Islander, 0.24% from other races, and 1.08% from two or more races. Hispanic or Latino of any race were 0.85% of the population.

There were 4,161 households, out of which 30.0% had children under the age of 18 living with them, 57.5% were married couples living together, 9.0% had a female householder with no husband present, and 29.9% were non-families. Of all households, 25.2% were made up of individuals, and 11.9% had someone living alone who was 65 years of age or older. The average household size was 2.47 and the average family size was 2.97.

In the town, the age distribution of the population shows 22.6% under the age of 18, 5.8% from 18 to 24, 27.7% from 25 to 44, 25.0% from 45 to 64, and 18.8% who were 65 years of age or older. The median age was 41 years. For every 100 females, there were 89.7 males. For every 100 females age 18 and over, there were 86.9 males.

The median income for a household in the town was $82,227, and the median income for a family was $62,845. Males had a median income of $40,872 versus $29,743 for females. The per capita income for the town was $24,025. About 2.0% of families and 3.0% of the population were below the poverty line, including 3.0% of those under age 18 and 2.5% of those age 65 or over.

== Notable person ==
- John Evert Van Alen, U.S. Representative

== Communities and locations in North Greenbush ==
- Defreestville – A hamlet in the southwestern part of the town at the junction of US 4 and NY 43. The community derives its name from the local DeFreest family. The Sharpe Homestead and Cemetery and John Evert Van Alen House are listed on the National Register of Historic Places.
- Snyders Corner – A hamlet north of Snyder's Lake and southeast of Wynantskill at the junction of West Sand Lake and Snyders Corner roads.
- Snyder's Lake – A hamlet occupying the majority of North Greenbush's eastern side.
- Wynantskill – A hamlet on the northern town line by the town's northeastern corner.
