= Poestenkill, New York (disambiguation) =

Poestenkill or Poesten Kill may refer to:

- Poesten Kill, a creek in Rensselaer County, New York and the namesake of the town and CDP
- Poestenkill, New York, a town in Rensselaer County
  - Poestenkill (CDP), New York, a census-designated place in the above town
