= New York State Route 351 =

State highway in Rensselaer County, New York, US

New York State Route 351
- Map of Rensselaer County in eastern New York with NY 351 highlighted in red

Route information
- Maintained by NYSDOT
- Length: 8.16 mi (13.13 km)
- Existed: April 1, 1980–present

Major junctions
- South end: NY 43 in Sand Lake
- North end: NY 2 in Brunswick

Location
- Country: United States
- State: New York
- Counties: Rensselaer

Highway system
- New York Highways; Interstate; US; State; Reference; Parkways
← NY 350	→ NY 352

New York State Route 351 (NY 351) is a north–south state highway in central Rensselaer County, New York, in the United States. It extends for 8.16 miles (13.13 km) from an intersection with NY 43 in the Sand Lake hamlet of West Sand Lake to a junction with NY 2 in the Brunswick hamlet of Cropseyville. The portion of NY 351 north of the hamlet of Poestenkill was originally designated as New York State Route 153 in the 1930s. This designation was removed in the 1940s, and the West Sand Lake–Cropseyville roadway became County Route 77 (CR 77) sometime afterward. On April 1, 1980, all of CR 77 was transferred to the state of New York, at which time it was redesignated as NY 351 by the New York State Department of Transportation (NYSDOT).

== Route description ==
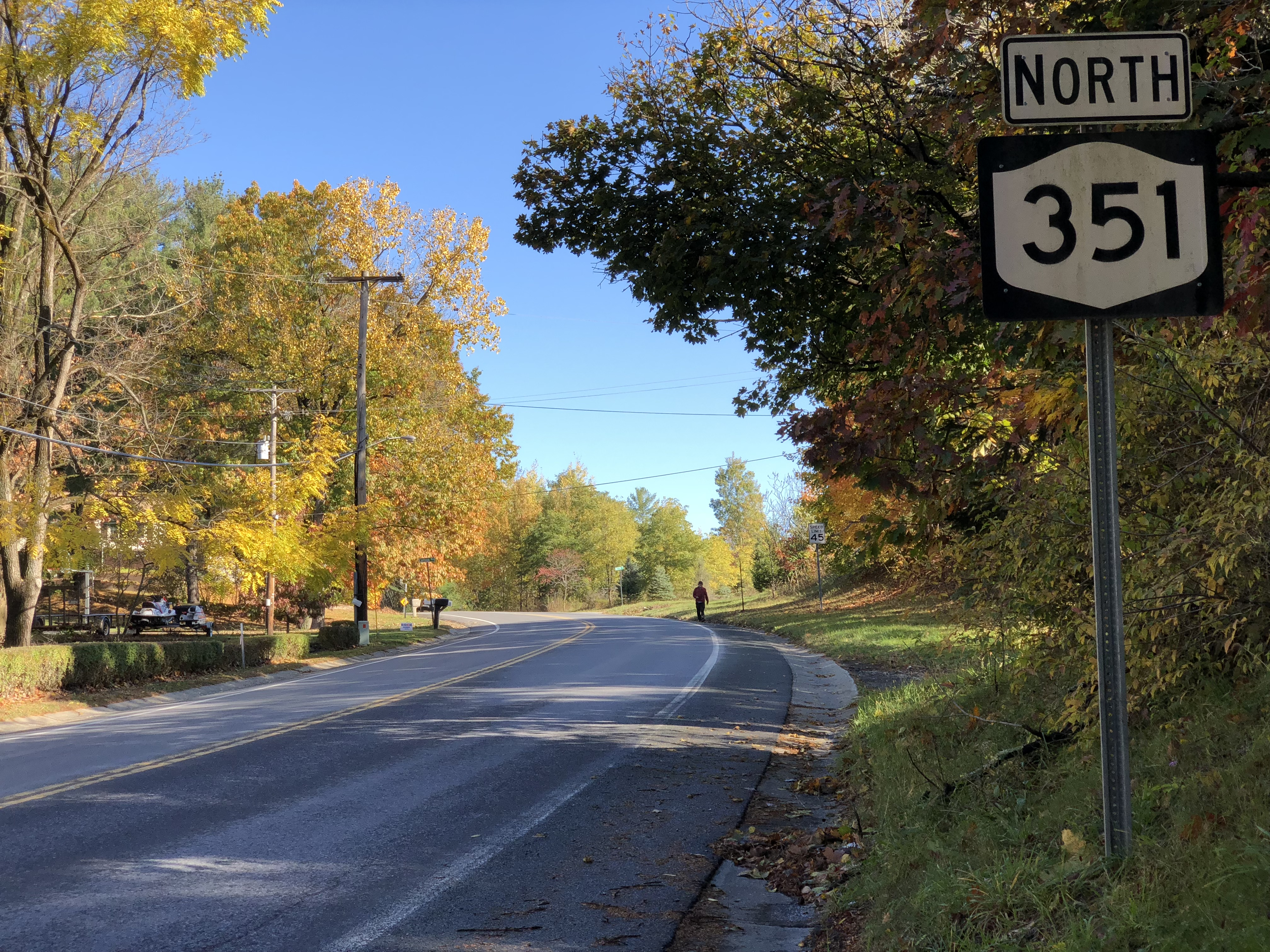
View north along NY 351 at NY 43 in Sand Lake

NY 351 begins approximately 0.7 miles (1.1 km) east of the hamlet of West Sand Lake at an intersection with NY 43. It initially heads northeastward through the town of Sand Lake as a two-lane highway named Reichard Lake Road, passing through a residential yet wooded area in the vicinity of Racquet Lake. The woods eventually overtake the homes as the route heads away from the lake and into the town of Poestenkill; however, NY 351 quickly enters another residential area based around the route's junction with NY 66. Just west of the intersection is Algonquin Middle School, part of the Averill Park Central School District. Past NY 66, NY 351 changes names to Round Top Road and heads into an isolated part of Poestenkill, passing through a mixture of forests and sparsely developed open areas as it meanders northward.

After 2 miles (3.2 km) of little to no development, NY 351 enters the hamlet of Poestenkill, the northernmost community of significance along the route. In the center of the community, it intersects NY 355 at an all-way stop intersection. The junction was originally the eastern terminus of NY 154; however, that route was eliminated as part of a highway maintenance swap in 1980 that ultimately created NY 351. The route continues north from Poestenkill as White Church Road, winding its way through the open and hilly terrain of the northern part of the town. The terrain's complexion remains the same in the adjacent town of Brunswick, where the highway changes names to Farm to Market Road. In Brunswick, NY 351 serves only a handful of homes before it terminates at a junction with NY 2 in the hamlet of Cropseyville. The Brunswick Central School District's Tamarac Secondary School is a short distance to the west on NY 2.

== History ==
The segment of modern NY 351 north of the hamlet of Poestenkill was originally designated as NY 153 c. 1932. This designation was removed in the early 1940s. All of former NY 153 was later incorporated into CR 77, a county route maintained by Rensselaer County that extended from the hamlet of West Sand Lake to the hamlet of Cropseyville via Postenkill. On April 1, 1980, ownership and maintenance of all of CR 77 was transferred from Rensselaer County to the state of New York as part of a county-wide highway maintenance swap. The route, now maintained by NYSDOT, was redesignated as NY 351.

== Major intersections ==
The entire route is in Rensselaer County.

Location	mi	km	Destinations	Notes
Town of Sand Lake	0.00	0.00	NY 43 – Averill Park, Defreestville	Southern terminus; community of West Sand Lake
Town of Poestenkill	1.62	2.61	NY 66 – Averill Park, Troy	
Town of Poestenkill	3.70	5.95	NY 355 west / CR 40 east – Troy, Berlin	Eastern terminus of NY 355; former eastern terminus of NY 154; hamlet of Poestenkill
Town of Brunswick	8.16	13.13	NY 2 – Troy, Cropseyville	Northern terminus
1.000 mi = 1.609 km; 1.000 km = 0.621 mi
