= New York State Route 154 =

Former state highway in New York State

New York State Route 154
- Map of the Albany area with NY 154 highlighted in red

Route information
- Maintained by NYSDOT
- Length: 5.81 mi (9.35 km)
- Existed: c. 1932–May 14, 1980

Major junctions
- West end: US 4 in Troy
- East end: CR 77 in Poestenkill

Location
- Country: United States
- State: New York
- Counties: Rensselaer

Highway system
- New York Highways; Interstate; US; State; Reference; Parkways
← NY 153	→ NY 155

New York State Route 154 (NY 154) was a state highway in Rensselaer County, New York, in the United States. It began at an intersection with U.S. Route 4 (US 4) in the city of Troy and ended at then-County Route 77 (CR 77, now NY 351) in the hamlet of Poestenkill. Along the way, it intersected NY 66 and NY 355. The route was assigned in the early 1930s and eliminated in 1980 as part of a highway maintenance swap between the state of New York and Rensselaer County. The portion of the highway between the Troy city line and NY 355 became County Route 130 while the part connecting NY 355 to Poestenkill became an extension of NY 355.

== Route description ==
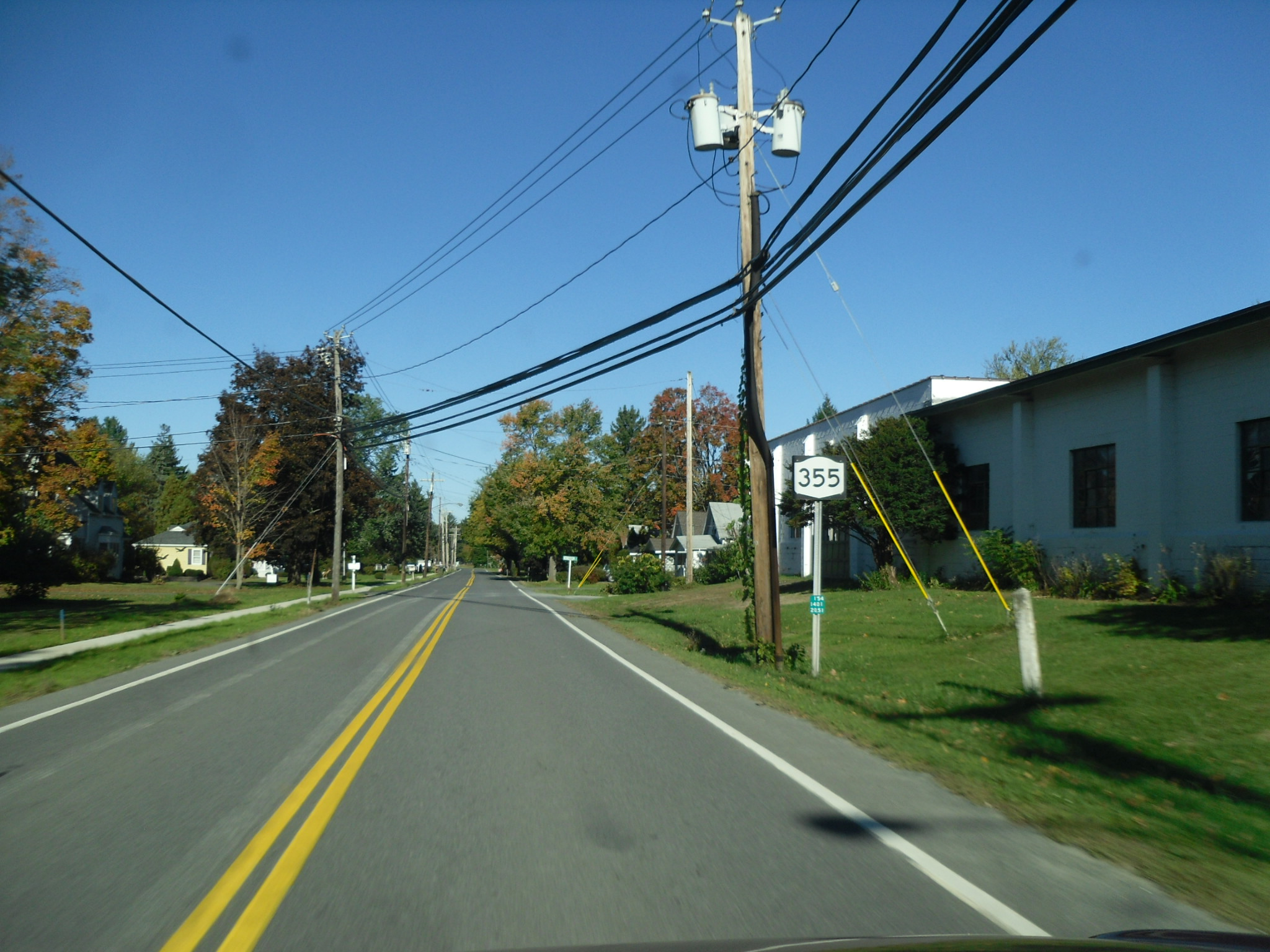
NY 355 westbound in Poestenkill. This part of NY 355 was formerly NY 154, and thus the top line of the reference marker below the NY 355 route marker reads "154".

NY 154 began at the intersection of US 4 (Vandenburgh Avenue) and Campbell Avenue in southern Troy. The route headed to the northeast, running alongside Wynants Kill as it followed Campbell Avenue through the residential southern portion of Troy. The route and the river crossed paths after 0.75 miles (1.21 km), with Wynants Kill proceeding southeastward toward the hamlet of Wynantskill and NY 154 continuing northeastward to a junction with Spring Avenue, a street linking NY 154 to the downtown district. Campbell Avenue ended here; however, the route continued on, following Spring Avenue east for three blocks to an intersection with NY 66 (Pawling Avenue) just south of the Emma Willard School.

Past NY 66, NY 154 traversed several additional city blocks before leaving Troy and entering the town of Brunswick. This section of the route passed through a mostly rural portion of Rensselaer County as it gradually headed southeastward toward an intersection with NY 355. Until 1980, NY 355 ended here while NY 154 continued into the hamlet of Poestenkill along Main Street. NY 154 passed north of the Rensselaer County Airpark west of the hamlet before coming to an end in the center of the community at a junction with CR 77 (now NY 351).

== History ==
NY 154 was assigned c. 1932 to an alignment extending from NY 66 to the hamlet of Poestenkill by way of Spring Avenue and Main Street. It was extended southwestward along Spring and Campbell Avenues to a new terminus at US 4 in the late 1970s, but was eliminated on May 14, 1980, as a result of a highway maintenance swap between the state of New York and Rensselaer County that took effect on April 1 of that year. As part of the swap, the portion of NY 154 between the Troy city limits and NY 355 was transferred from the state to the county and redesignated as CR 130. The remaining state-maintained portion of NY 154 from NY 355 to Poestenkill became an extension of NY 355; however, the segment still bears reference markers for NY 154. Within Troy, the route was maintained by the city.

== Major intersections ==
The entire route was in Rensselaer County.

Location	mi	km	Destinations	Notes
Troy	0.00	0.00	US 4 (Vandenburgh Avenue)	Western terminus
Troy	1.46	2.35	NY 66 (Pawling Avenue)	
Town of Poestenkill	5.47	8.80	NY 355 west	Eastern terminus of NY 355
Town of Poestenkill	7.27	11.70	CR 77	Eastern terminus; hamlet of Poestenkill; now NY 351
1.000 mi = 1.609 km; 1.000 km = 0.621 mi

== See also ==
- List of county routes in Rensselaer County, New York
