= New York State Route 355 =

State highway in Rensselaer County, New York, US

New York State Route 355
- Map of Rensselaer County in eastern New York with NY 355 highlighted in red

Route information
- Maintained by NYSDOT
- Length: 2.94 mi (4.73 km)
- Existed: by 1946–present

Major junctions
- West end: NY 66 in North Greenbush
- East end: NY 351 in Poestenkill

Location
- Country: United States
- State: New York
- Counties: Rensselaer

Highway system
- New York Highways; Interstate; US; State; Reference; Parkways
← NY 354	→ NY 356

New York State Route 355 (NY 355) is an east–west state highway in Rensselaer County, New York, in the United States. The western terminus of the route is at an intersection with NY 66 in the town of North Greenbush. Its eastern terminus is at a junction with NY 351 in the hamlet of Poestenkill within the town of the same name. NY 355 originally consisted only of the section of the route between NY 66 and Spring Avenue; however, it was extended east to Postenkill hamlet in 1980, partially replacing NY 154.

== Route description ==
NY 355 begins at an intersection with NY 66 in the town of North Greenbush. The highway proceeds eastward into the town of Poestenkill, passing to the south of residential homes and Moules Pond. Route 355 is known for most of its length as Cooper Hill Road as it heads eastward towards downtown Poestenkill. County Route 130 (CR 130, formerly NY 154) merges in from the northeast and the route changes names to Spring Avenue. NY 355 continues, passing to the north of Rensselaer County Airpark. NY 355 terminates at an intersection with NY 351 and CR 40 in the hamlet of Poestenkill.

== History ==
NY 355 was assigned by 1946 to a short connector highway between NY 66 in North Greenbush and NY 154 (Spring Avenue) in the town of Poestenkill. From there, NY 154 continued east to the hamlet of Poestenkill, where it ended at a junction with Round Top and White Church Roads. On April 1, 1980, ownership and maintenance of NY 154 from the Troy city line to NY 355 was transferred from the state of New York to Rensselaer County as part of a highway maintenance swap. The NY 154 designation was completely removed on May 14, 1980, and the portion of NY 154's routing that was not given to Rensselaer County became an eastward extension of NY 355.

== Major intersections ==
The entire route is in Rensselaer County.

Location	mi	km	Destinations	Notes
Town of North Greenbush	0.00	0.00	NY 66 – Troy, Averill Park	Western terminus
Town of Poestenkill	1.14	1.83	CR 130 west (Spring Avenue Extension)	Eastern terminus of CR 130 (formerly part of NY 154)
Town of Poestenkill	2.94	4.73	NY 351 – Cropseyville, West Sand Lake CR 40 east – Berlin	Eastern terminus; western terminus of CR 40; hamlet of Poestenkill
1.000 mi = 1.609 km; 1.000 km = 0.621 mi
