= Mohawk Ambulance Service =

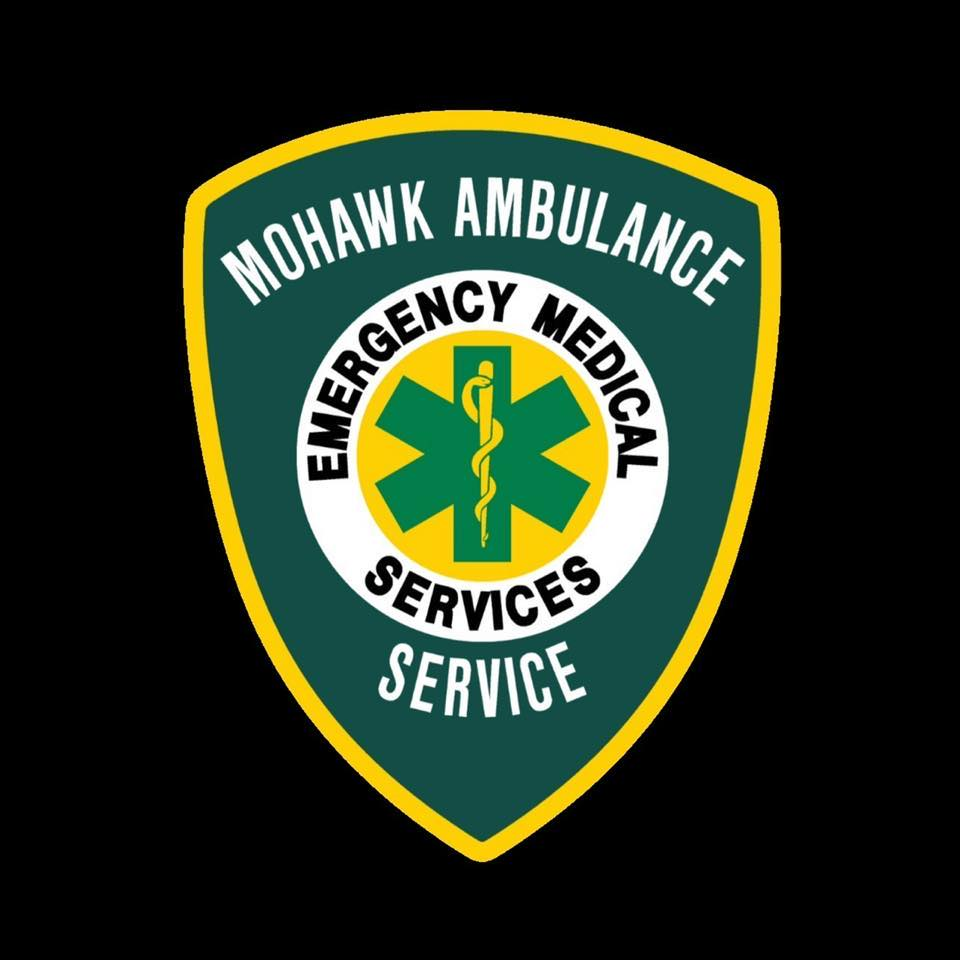
- Motto: Dedicated. Reliable. Professional.
- Established: 1978
- Headquarters: Schenectady, NY
- Jurisdiction: Albany, NY Schenectady, NY Rensselaer County, NY Rensselaer, NY Schenectady County, NY Scotia, NY Cohoes, New York
- Dept. type: Private Ambulance Service
- Employees: ~500
- BLS or ALS: Both
- Stations: 6
- Ambulances: 50
- Fly-cars: 8
- CEO: James McPartlon III
- Medical director: Dr. Heidi Cordi
- Responses: 82,000+ (2025)
- Website: mohawkambulanceservice.com

Mohawk Ambulance Locations

Mohawk Ambulance Service is the largest privately owned ambulance service in upstate New York. The service operates Schenectady Ambulance Service, Capital District Ambulance Service, and Doctor's Ambulance Service.

== Company history ==
Mohawk Ambulance & Oxygen Service, Inc. was founded on July 22, 1965, by then-police officer Edward J. O'Connor. It was dissolved by proclamation and annulment of authority by the New York State Department of State on March 31, 1982.

Parkland Ambulance Service, Inc., a company which is unrelated to Mohawk Ambulance & Oxygen Service, Inc., was incorporated in the State of New York on March 2, 1978. Parkland Ambulance Service, Inc. operates its ambulance service under the authority of the New York State Department of Health under the name Mohawk Ambulance Service. Mohawk Ambulance Service began providing paramedic level service in 1982, one of the first ambulance services in the area to do so. In 1984, Schenectady Ambulance Service was purchased by the owners of Parkland Ambulance Service, Inc., and is now operated alongside (but independently) and staffed by Mohawk Ambulance Service. In 1985, Mohawk Ambulance Service opened a station in the city of Troy, New York, and followed with a third station in Albany, New York, in 1986. In 1989, Mohawk Ambulance Service began to operate a specialty neonate/pediatric transport unit in conjunction with Albany Medical Center. In 2002, Mohawk Ambulance Service opened a fourth station in the town of Brunswick, New York, and began to provide primary 911 response to the town and surrounding municipalities. Station 5, the second in the city of Albany, was opened in 2008. In 2012, a sixth station was opened in the town of Glenville, New York.

In 2017, Parkland Ambulance Service, Inc. acquired the assets of Capital District Ambulance Service, Inc. and Physician's Ambulance Service, Inc. d/b/a Doctor's Ambulance Service. and began additional operations under the names Capital District Ambulance Service and Doctors Ambulance Service. In 2025 Mohawk expanded there coverage and acquired the City of Cohoes and will be operating out of Cohoes Fire Central Station after a contract agreement.

== Stations ==
Mohawk Ambulance Stations
Station	Address
Headquarters	357 Kings Road, Schenectady, NY
Station 1	793 State Street, Schenectady, NY
Station 2	161 McChesney Ave, Brunswick, NY
Station 3	290 Quail Street, Albany, NY
Station 4	25 Central Ave, Cohoes, NY
Station 5	570 Central Ave, Albany, NY
Station 6	176 Freemans Bridge Rd, Schenectady, NY

== Coverage area ==
=== BLS 911 - (Fire Department Based ALS) ===
- City of Albany (Albany County)
- City of Schenectady (Schenectady County)
- Village of Scotia (Schenectady County)

=== ALS Primary ===
- ~~Town of Brunswick (Rensselaer County)~~ Services Discontinued (12/2025)
- Town of Glenville (Schenectady County) [except Scotia]
- Town of Niskayuna (Schenectady County) [except Niskayuna Fire District 1]
- City of Rensselaer (Rensselaer County)
- City of Cohoes (Albany County)

=== ALS Intercept ===
- Town of Berlin (Rensselaer County)
- Town of Castleton (Rensselaer County)
- Town of East Nassau (Rensselaer County)
- Town of Grafton (Rensselaer County)
- Town of Nassau (Rensselaer County)
- Town of Stephentown (Rensselaer County)
