= Barberville Falls =

Coordinates: 42.6850°N 73.5397°W

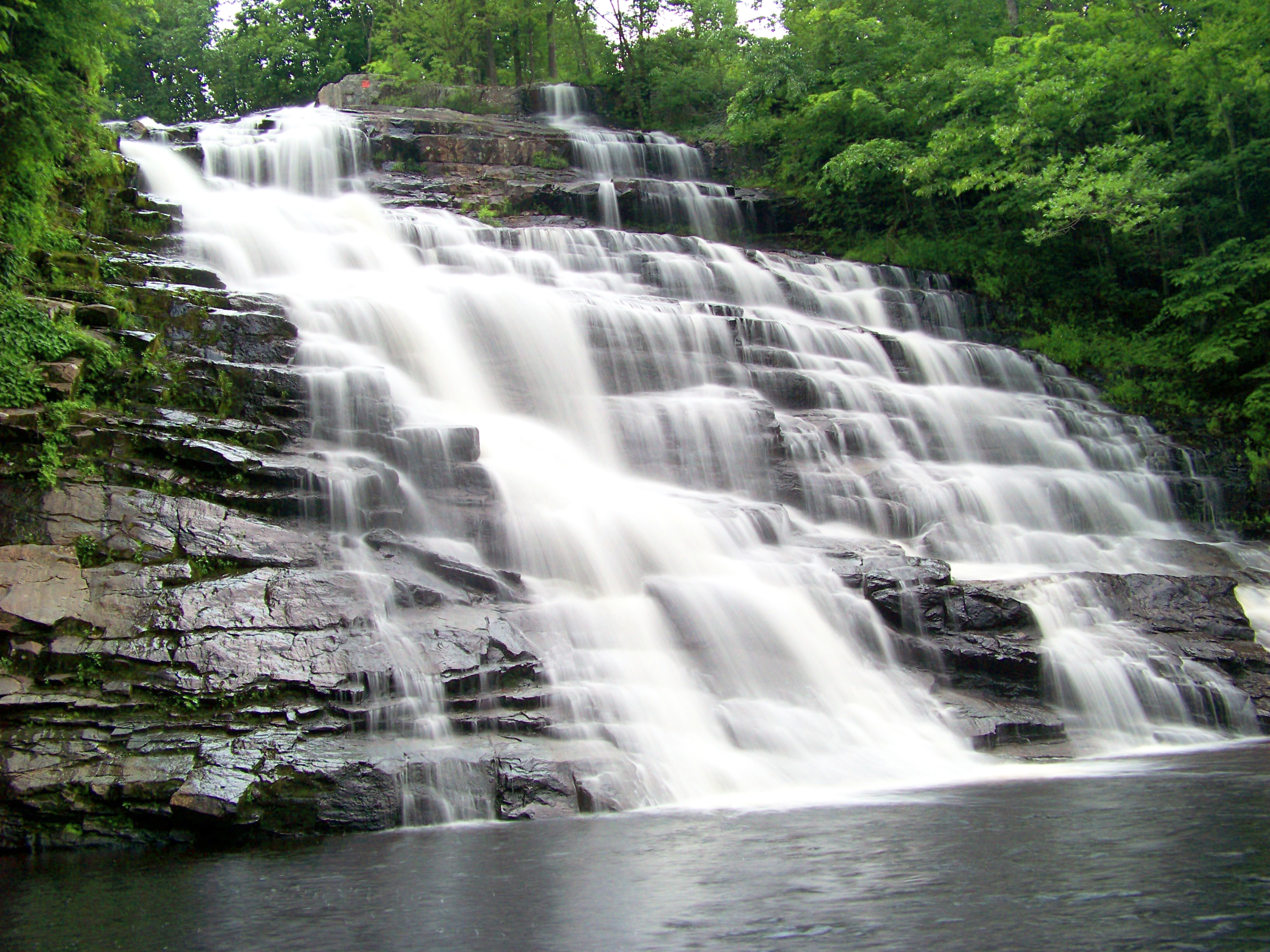
- The falls in 2012
- Interactive map of Barberville Falls
- Location: The Hamlet of Barberville, in Poestenkill, Rensselaer County, New York
- Total height: 92 ft (28 m)
- Total width: 55 ft (17 m)

The Barberville Falls is a waterfall and nature preserve located in Poestenkill, New York. The fall flows into the Poesten Kill, which is a large creek that flows through Rensselaer County.

== Features ==
Above Barberville, the Poesten Kill flows about 35 square miles on the Rensselaer Plateau — an area from Dyken Pond on the north to Taborton on the south. This drainage basin generates a substantial flow of water throughout the year, although the flow is most dramatic in the spring when the winter snow melts. When it reaches the Hudson River at Troy, this same flow of water provided hydraulic power for much of the city's early industrial development.

Below the falls, the stream flows through a large gore 100 feet deep and 500 to 1,000 feet wide. The waterfall itself is about 90 feet high and 50 feet wide. The main rock type at the falls is Rensselear Greywacke; above the falls are large beds of slate and limestone.

== Barberville Falls Preserve ==
The Barberville Falls Preserve (the Preserve) is in the Town of Poestenkill, Rensselaer County, along 0.57 miles of the Poesten Kill and includes 138 acres of undeveloped land. A major tributary of the Poesten Kill, draining Davitt Pond, transects the property. A major feature of the Preserve is the Barberville Falls of the Poesten Kill, shared with neighboring private property on the west side of the falls.

The Nature Conservancy (TNC) acquired the Preserve in 1967 and owned it until August 2019 when they transferred ownership to the Rensselaer Plateau Alliance.

== Trails ==
Open dawn to dusk, the nature preserve has three main carved trails; The Creek Trail, The Falls Trail, and The Ridge Trail.

The Creek Trail is located just northwest of the small parking area along Plank Road. It is a smooth, trail marked with gray markers. It goes down a slope to the banks of the Poestenkill and then continues a short distance both upstream and downstream. Round trip is approximately a mile. Beyond the ends of the trail in both directions is private property. The Rensselaer Plateau Alliance urges visitors to please obey the signs and respect private property.

Parking for both the Falls Trail and the Ridge Trail is at 23 Blue Factory Road. This parking area will accommodate 16 vehicles.

The Falls Trail (yellow markers) leaves from the main parking area. In a short distance, it begins a steep traversing decent to the bottom of the falls. Visitors can see the stoneworks of a mill project that was never finished from the bottom of the falls. Round trip is approximately a quarter mile.

The Ridge Trail leaves from the main parking area. The trail is generally well defined and marked with orange diamonds or orange ribbon in a few spots. The trail starts out rocky as it winds its way around a flattened stone fence but quickly joins up with what was probably an old cart path used by the neighboring farm. Right before that intersection there is a junction for the loop the trail makes but it is not well marked from this side. At approximately 0.75 of a mile the trail makes a sharp left onto a less wide but still well defined path through the woods. One does have to cross four tributaries to the Poestenkill but they are narrow and stepping stones can be found to cross over dryly. The trail comes to the Poestenkill opposite the southern terminus of the Creek Trail and then climbs a ridge alongside of the stream. While glimpses of the falls can be seen from the trail, hemlocks block a clear view. Round trip is approximately 1.3 miles.

The old Falls Trail is now closed. This trail left from Blue Factory Road near the bridge and was very steep and slippery. It also required visitors to walk along Plank and Blue Factory Roads where there were no shoulders. The Rensselaer Plateau Alliance asks all visitors to use the new parking and trails.

Up to date information about the trails can be found at https://www.rensselaerplateau.org/barbervillefalls

== See also ==
- List of waterfalls

== See also ==
- Poesten Kill Creek
- Poestenkill, New York
- Waterfalls
