= Queechy Lake =

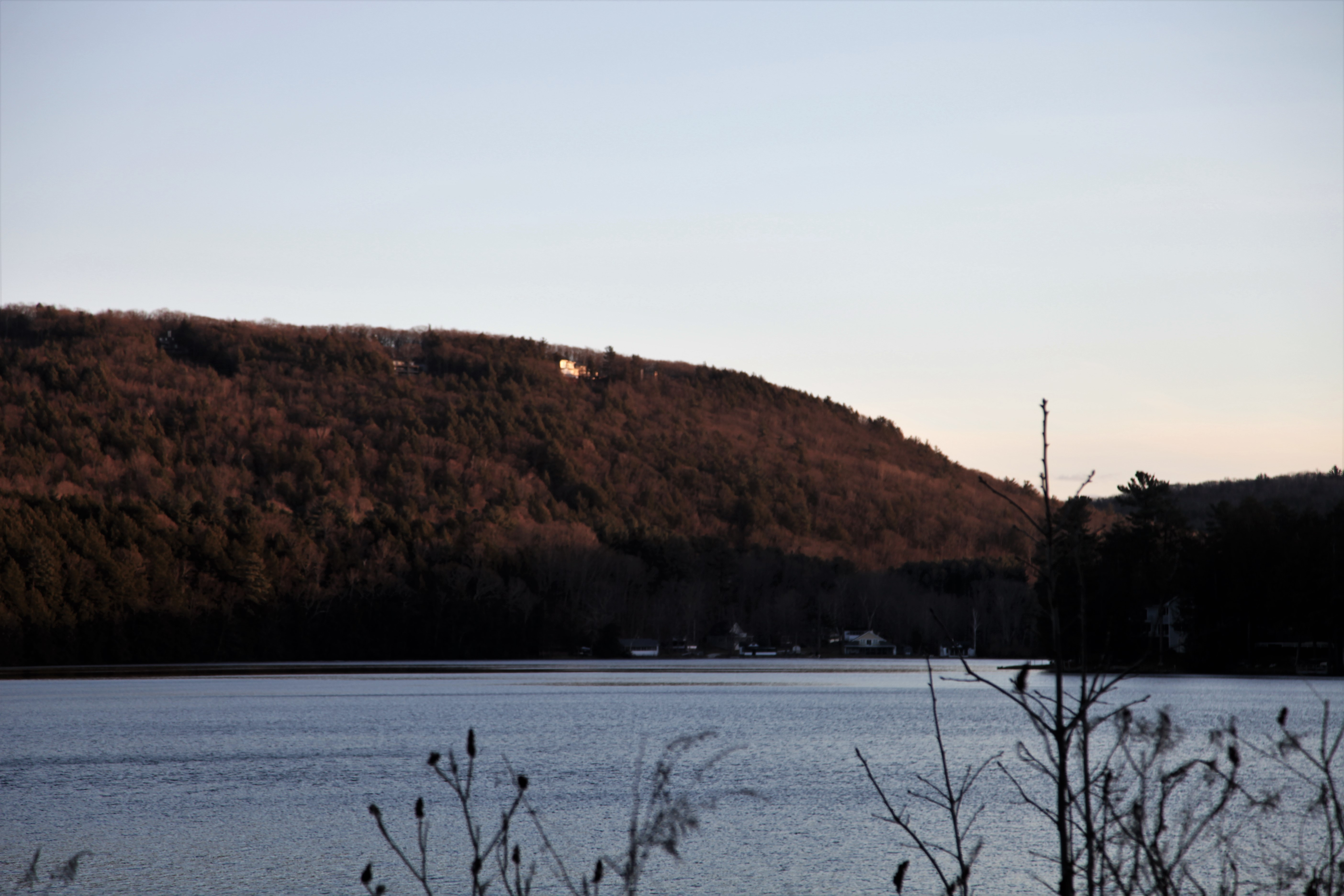

- Location within New York
- Location: Canaan, Columbia County, New York
- Coordinates: 42°24′28″N 073°24′54″W
- Type: reservoir, natural lake
- Basin countries: United States
- Surface area: 141 acres (57 ha)
- Max. depth: 40 ft (12 m)
- Surface elevation: 1,020 ft (311 m)

Queechy Lake is a lake in Canaan, Columbia County, New York. Situated near the Massachusetts state border, the lake is 40 feet (12 m) deep and contains a surface area of 141 acres (0.57 km^{2}). The name comes from the Native American Mahican name Quis-sich-kook, of unknown meaning.

The lake is located near two major roads, New York State Route 295 and New York State Route 22. Among the present fish species are brown bullhead, brown trout, smallmouth bass, chain pickerel, pumpkinseed, bluegill, rock bass, rainbow trout, black crappie and yellow perch. Queechy Lake is a natural body of water; however, sometime prior to 1910, the water levels were raised as a result of the construction of a dam along the Stony Kill, a tributary of Queechy Lake. The purpose of the dam was to store water that would supply mills located downstream. In the early 19th century, a summer of dry weather contributed to decreased water levels, which exposed a muddy surface at the lower end of the lake.
