= East Nassau Central School =

- U.S. National Register of Historic Places
- Location within New York Location within the United States
- Location: 37 Garfield Rd., East Nassau, New York
- Coordinates: 42°30′33″N 73°30′17″W
- Area: 2.7 acres (1.1 ha)
- Built: 1930
- Architect: Atkinson, E.G.; Thompson & Schillinger
- Architectural style: Classical Revival
- NRHP reference No.: 97000418
- Added to NRHP: May 23, 1997

East Nassau Central School is a historic school building located at East Nassau in Rensselaer County, New York. It was built in 1930 and is a two-story, steel frame and concrete block building with a brick veneer in the Classical Revival style. It sits upon a raised concrete foundation and has a flat roof concealed behind a low parapet wall with concrete capstones. It features a small entrance portico of brick with concrete trim and a wrought iron balustrade.

It was listed on the National Register of Historic Places in 1997.
