= New York State Route 295 =

State highway in Columbia County, New York, US

Route 295
- Map of Columbia County in eastern New York with NY 295 and MA Route 295 highlighted in red, and NY 980D in blue

Route information
- Maintained by NYSDOT and MassDOT
- Length: 14.55 mi (23.42 km) 12.88 mi (20.73 km) in New York; 1.67 mi (2.69 km) in Massachusetts
- Existed: c. 1931–present

Major junctions
- West end: NY 66 in Chatham village, NY
- Taconic State Parkway in Chatham town; NY 22 in Canaan
- East end: Route 41 in Richmond, MA

Location
- Country: United States
- State: New York
- Counties: Columbia (NY), Berkshire (MA)

Highway system
- New York Highways; Interstate; US; State; Reference; Parkways
- Massachusetts State Highway System; Interstate; US; State
← I-295	NY	→ NY 296
← I-295	MA	→ I-391
← Route 203		→ Route 213

New York State Route 295 (NY 295) is a 12.88-mile (20.73 km) state highway in Columbia County, New York, in the United States. It begins at an intersection with NY 66 in the village of Chatham and heads generally easterly to the Massachusetts border in the town of Canaan, where the road becomes Massachusetts Route 295 for another 1.67 miles (2.69 km) to a junction with Route 41 in Richmond, Massachusetts. Route 295 is the highest-numbered Massachusetts state highway, and the only state highway that shares its number with another numbered highway in Massachusetts, this being Interstate 295.

== Route description ==
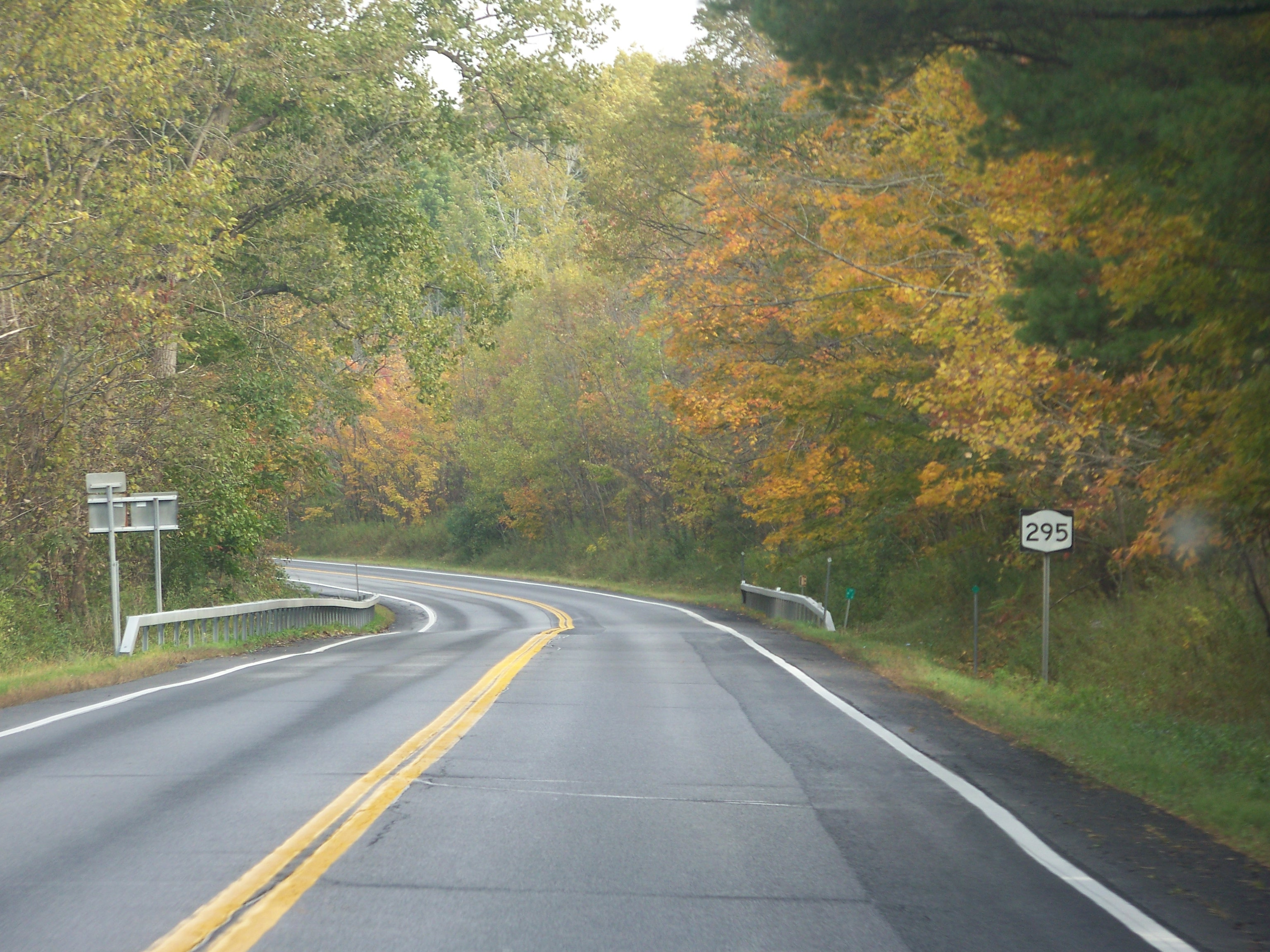
Eastbound on NY 295 in Chatham between the Taconic Parkway and I-90

At its western terminus, NY 295 begins at NY 66 in the village of Chatham, initially known as Railroad Avenue. As the road changes names to Spring Street, the Stony Kill approaches from the west and roughly parallels NY 295 for much of its duration. Within the hamlet, NY 295 intersects several local roads and a pair of train tracks. The highway proceeds towards the northwest as it passes to the east of a pond, and subsequently intersects the Taconic State Parkway. Upon crossing the state parkway, NY 295 takes a more easterly direction; however, it turns towards the northwest when it reaches New Concord Road. The road intersects the Berkshire Connector of the New York State Thruway, or Interstate 90 (I-90), and enters the hamlet of East Chatham shortly after.

In East Chatham, NY 295 becomes concurrent with County Route 9. When the two highways split, NY 295 heads towards the east. Several local highways intersect from the north, while the highway remains routed along the Stony Kill. The road bends towards the southeast into Canaan, where the Stony Kill turns sharply towards the north, and NY 295 crosses the Queechy Lake Brook. Crossing between two mountains, the highway passes to the southwest of Queechy Lake, and intersects with NY 22. After a final, brief turn to the east, NY 295 crosses the New York–Massachusetts border; it continues into Massachusetts as Route 295, a connector road between NY 295 and Route 41 before terminating.

A completely separate piece of road 0.2 miles (0.32 km) long, south of NY 295 that used to be a part of the original routing, but is now separate as unsigned NY 980D, a reference route, connecting MA 102 to NY 22. It is very short, but used to be part of the NY/MA 295 system before it was rerouted.

== History ==
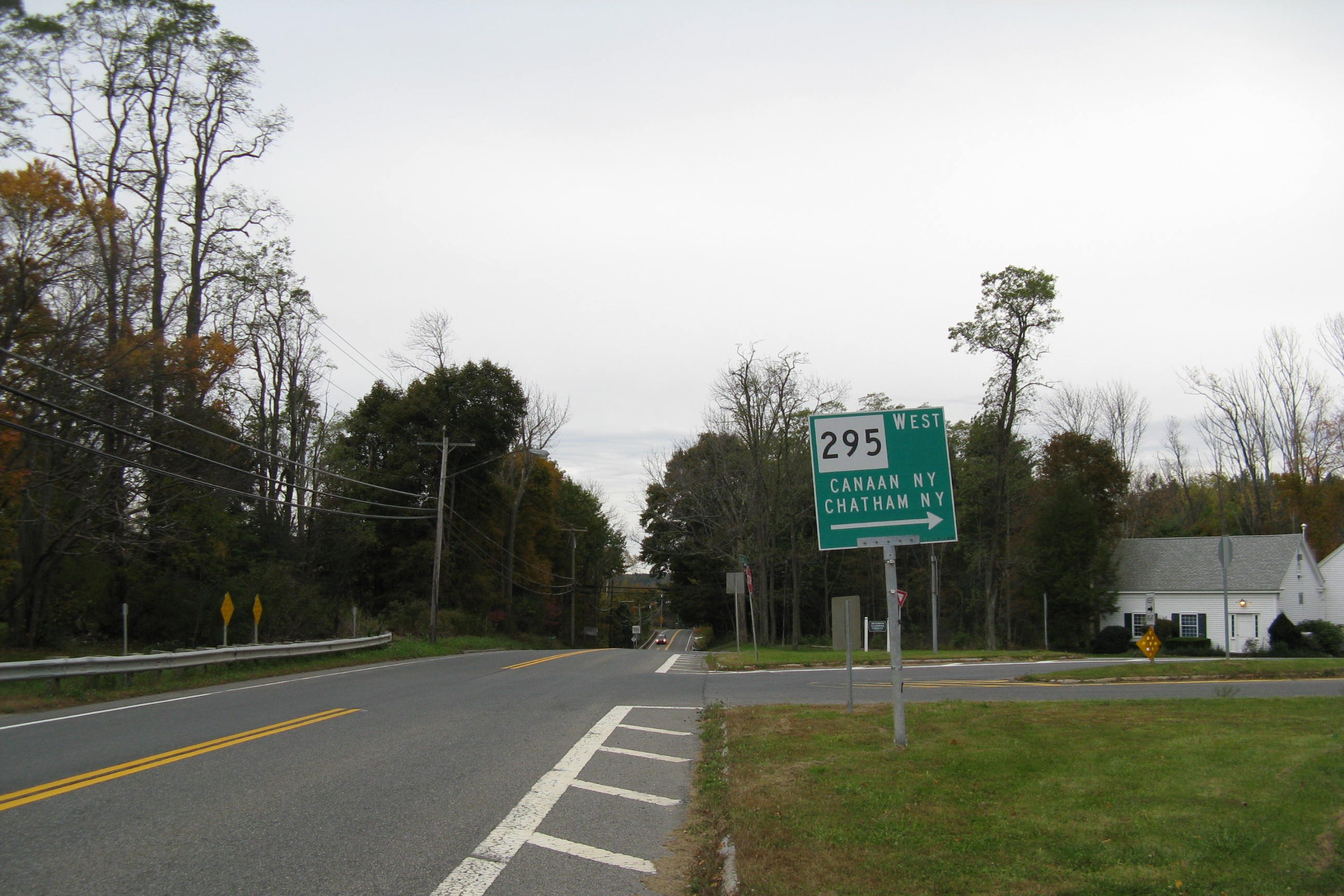
Turnoff for Route 295 on Route 41 in Richmond, Massachusetts

The first state route to serve the hamlet of East Chatham was NY 204, an east–west route assigned as part of the 1930 renumbering of state highways in New York. NY 204 began at NY 66 in Malden Bridge and followed Albany Turnpike Road to East Chatham, from where it continued southeast to the Massachusetts state line by way of a series of roads in the modern I-90 corridor. The route was extended northwest to U.S. Route 20 in Nassau by the following year and realigned east of East Chatham to follow what is now NY 295 to a new state line crossing at Canaan c. 1935. The short 1.5-mile (2.4 km) continuation of NY 204 to Route 41 in Richmond, Massachusetts, was designated as Route 204 around this time.

NY 295, meanwhile, was assigned c. 1931 to an alignment extending from Austerlitz to East Chatham. At the time, the route began at an intersection with NY 203 southeast of Chatham and headed to the northeast, bypassing Chatham to the east on Bushnell and Birge Hill Roads. It joined its modern alignment southwest of East Chatham and followed it into the hamlet, where the route ended at a junction with NY 204. The portion of NY 295 south of East Chatham was realigned to follow its current alignment c. 1938. Around the same time, NY 295 was extended eastward to the state line, replacing part of NY 204. Massachusetts subsequently renumbered Route 204 to Route 295 in order to preserve the number continuity. MA 204 was replaced by MA 295 in 1939.

NY 204 was truncated to East Chatham following the extension of NY 295. It remained in this truncated form until it was eliminated entirely in the early 1940s. A small segment of NY 204's original routing between the then-proposed routing of NY 22 and the state line at West Stockbridge, Massachusetts, became NY 432 after NY 204 was realigned c. 1935. As originally planned, NY 22 would have followed a more westerly alignment through Austerlitz and Canaan; however, the road was ultimately built on a path that supplanted most of NY 432. As such, the NY 432 designation was removed after the new stretch of NY 22 opened in 1940. A small section of NY 432's former right-of-way between NY 22 and the Massachusetts state line is still state-maintained as NY 980D, an unsigned reference route.

== Major intersections ==
State	County	Location	mi	km	Destinations	Notes
New York	Columbia	Village of Chatham	0.00	0.00	NY 66 (Hudson Avenue)	Western terminus of NY 295
New York	Columbia	Town of Chatham	2.70	4.35	Taconic State Parkway	Access via Birge Hill/Hartigan Roads; exit 102 on Taconic State Parkway
New York	Columbia	Town of Chatham	4.60	7.40	To I-90 Toll / Berkshire Connector	Access via Rock City Road
New York	Columbia	Canaan	11.93	19.20	NY 22 to I-90 Toll / Berkshire Connector – New Lebanon, Austerlitz	
New York–Massachusetts state line			12.88 0.00	20.73 0.00	Route transition	
Massachusetts	Berkshire	Richmond	1.67	2.69	Route 41 – West Stockbridge, Great Barrington, Pittsfield	Eastern terminus of Route 295
1.000 mi = 1.609 km; 1.000 km = 0.621 mi: Route transition

== See also ==
- Massachusetts
