= New York State Route 66 =

Highway in New York

New York State Route 66
- Map of eastern New York with NY 66 highlighted in red

Route information
- Maintained by NYSDOT and the city of Troy
- Length: 46.30 mi (74.51 km)
- Existed: mid-1920s–present

Major junctions
- South end: US 9 / NY 23B in Hudson
- NY 9H in Claverack; NY 203 in Chatham; NY 295 in Chatham; US 20 from Nassau to East Nassau; NY 43 in Averill Park; NY 351 in Poestenkill; NY 355 in Wynantskill; NY 150 in Wynantskill
- North end: NY 2 in Troy

Location
- Country: United States
- State: New York
- Counties: Columbia, Rensselaer

Highway system
- New York Highways; Interstate; US; State; Reference; Parkways
← NY 65	→ NY 67

New York State Route 66 (NY 66) is a state highway in the Capital District of New York in the United States. The route begins at an intersection with US 9 and NY 23B in the Columbia County city of Hudson and ends at a junction with NY 2 in the Rensselaer County city of Troy. While both Hudson and Troy are located on the Hudson River, NY 66 follows a more inland routing between the two locations to serve several rural villages and hamlets, including Chatham and Sand Lake. NY 66 overlaps with U.S. Route 20 (US 20) and NY 43, two regionally important east–west highways, in Nassau and Sand Lake, respectively.

The route was assigned in the mid-1920s to an alignment extending from Claverack to Nassau via Ghent. It was extended north to Troy as part of the 1930 renumbering of state highways in New York and rerouted south of Ghent to serve Hudson c. 1933. Originally, NY 66 directly served Averill Park via modern County Route 45 (CR 45) and part of NY 43; however, it was realigned in 1980 to bypass the hamlet to the northeast. The segment of NY 66 between Sand Lake and US 20 was part of Route 21, an unsigned legislative route, in the early 1920s.

== Route description ==
=== Columbia County ===
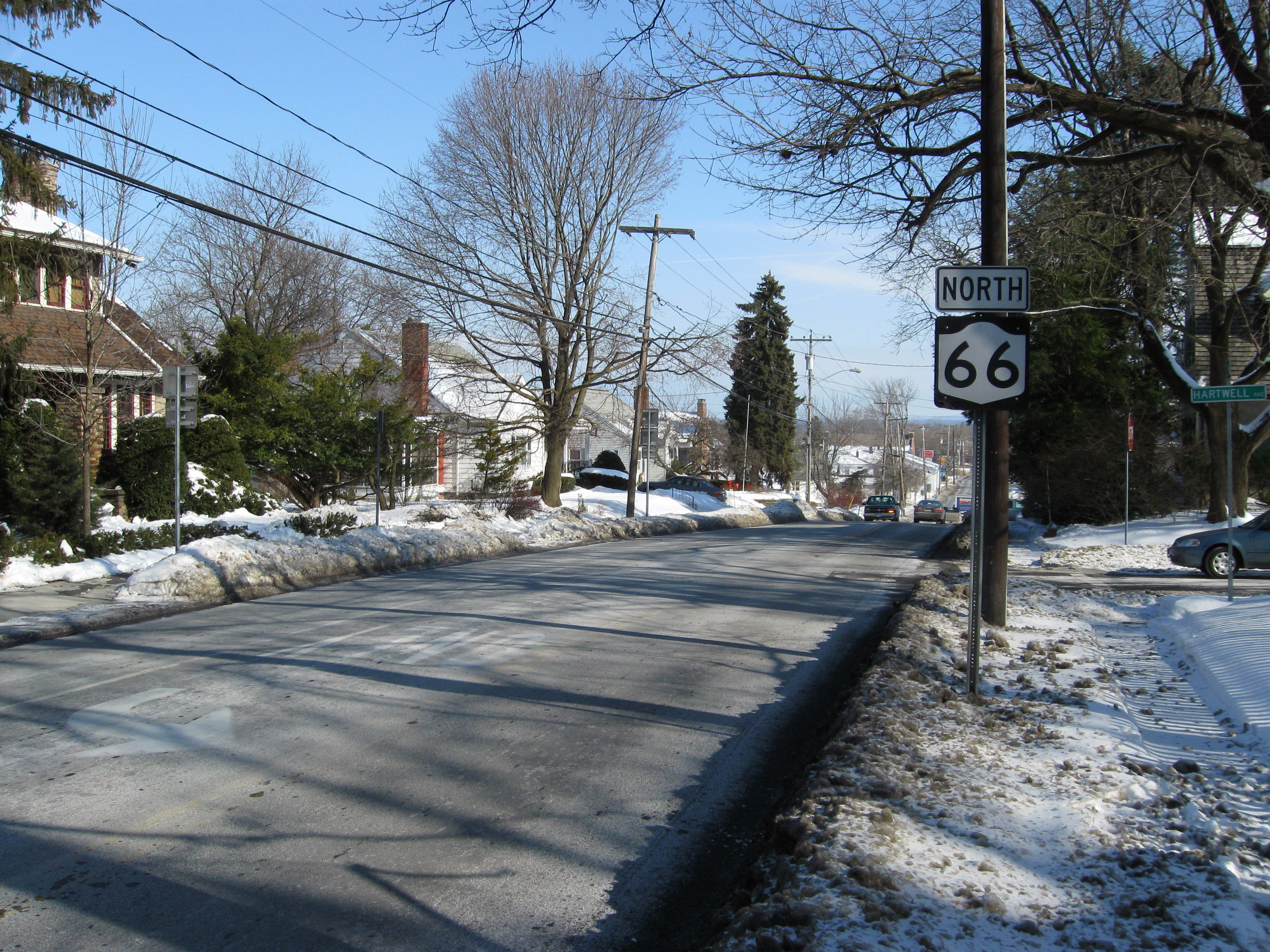
NY 66 proceeding north from its junction with NY 23B in the city of Hudson

NY 66 begins at an intersection with US 9 and NY 23B (Green Street) in the center of the city of Hudson. Proceeding northeast along Union Turnpike, NY 66 becomes a two-lane city road through Hudson, soon leaving for the town of Greenport, where it becomes a two-lane commercial street north of the city. Retaining its northeastern direction, the route crosses over the Claverack Creek and enters the town of the same name. The route passes the Dutch Village mobile home park and several residences before reaching an intersection with County Route 18 (CR 18 or Fish and Game Road). After CR 18, NY 66 becomes primarily rural in nature.

Entering the hamlet of Brick Tavern, NY 66 reaches a junction with NY 9H in the southern end of the hamlet. NY 66 continues northeast through the town of Claverack, reaching the southern terminus of CR 20 at the eastern end of Brick Tavern. Passing south of Columbia County Airport, the route passes the junction with former CR 20, crossing into the town of Ghent. Continuing northeast, NY 66 remains rural in nature, soon reaching a junction with CR 9 (Mellenville Road). NY 66 reaches the hamlet of Ghent, where it meets a junction with the southern terminus of a section of CR 21 (Church Street).

Continuing out of Ghent, NY 66 crosses over an abandoned railroad grade and a junction with another section of CR 9 (Arnolds Mill Road). At CR 9, NY 66 turns north through the town of Ghent, reaching the hamlet of Buckneyville. The two-lane roadway remains rural for this portion but the road crosses into the village of Chatham, where it gains the moniker of Hudson Avenue. Crossing through a residential section of Chatham, NY 66 reaches a junction in the eastern end of the village with NY 203 (Church Street / Coleman Street). Passing the Chatham Rural Cemetery, NY 66 enters the Depot Square, where it passes Chatham's New York Central Railroad station.

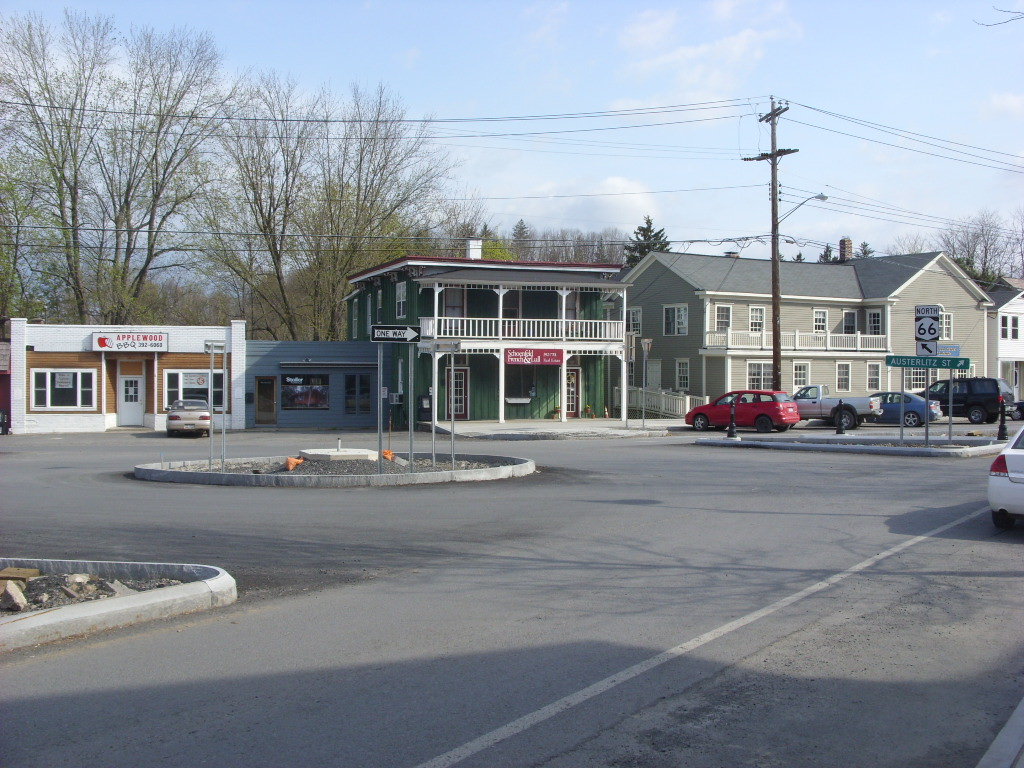
NY 66 at the roundabout in the northern end of the village of Chatham

Passing the station, NY 66 also has a junction with the terminus of NY 295 (Railroad Street). Now known as Main Street, the route remains commercial through the northern reaches of the village, turning northwest at a roundabout with Austerlitz Street, River Street and Kinderhook Street. Continuing onto Center Street, NY 66 winds across the northern reaches of the village before crossing into the town of Chatham, where it drops the Center Street moniker. Through the town of Chatham, the route returns to its rural nature, passing a junction with a former alignment of NY 66 that dead-ends in the nearby woods. Turning northwest again, NY 66 enters the hamlet of Old Chatham, where it reaches a junction with CR 13 before crossing Kinderhook Creek.

After crossing Kinderhook Creek, NY 66 reaches a junction with CR 28. Just north of the hamlet, the route turns northeast at a junction with CR 17. Winding along Kinderhook Creek, NY 66 turns northward near Spangler Road, remaining a two-lane rural roadway. Continuing northward, the route crosses under the Berkshire Thruway section of the New York State Thruway (I-90). After a junction with the eastern terminus of CR 32, NY 66 turns northeast into the hamlet of Malden Bridge, reaching a junction with Albany Turnpike, where NY 66 turns southeast and re-crosses Kinderhook Creek.

After crossing Kinderhook Creek, NY 66 turns northeast and out of Malden Bridge, reaching the hamlet of Riders Mills, a rural community alongside the creek. Less than a mile north of Riders Mills, the route crosses the Rensselaer County line and leaves the town of Chatham for the town of Nassau.

=== Rensselaer County ===
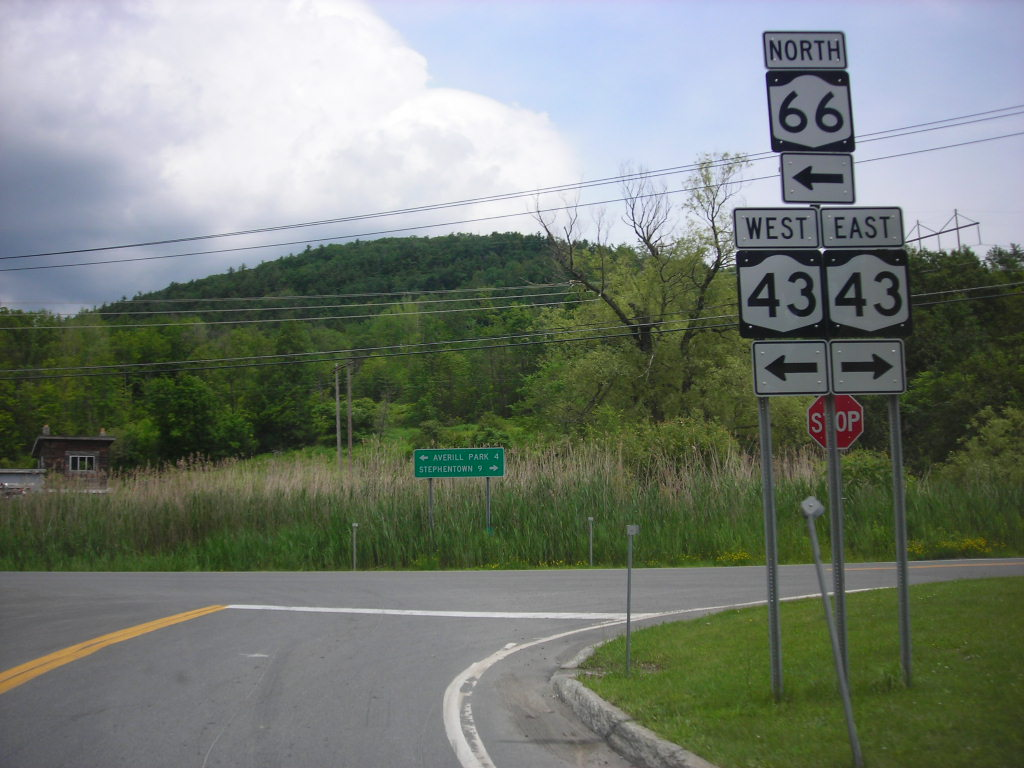
NY 66 northbound at the junction with NY 43 in Denault Corners

Now in the town of Nassau, NY 66 continues northeast along Kinderhook Creek, soon reaching a junction with US 20. Continuing to parallel Kinderhook Creek, US 20 and NY 66 form a concurrency through Nassau, passing several former alignments of US 20 before crossing over the creek twice. Rapidly approaching the Columbia County line once again, the routes reach the residential hamlet of Brainard, where they meet the northern terminus of CR 19, a short connector the aforementioned Columbia CR 13. Just east of this junction, NY 66 forks north off US 20 and continues north along Kinderhook Creek as it enters the village of East Nassau.

In the center of East Nassau, NY 66 reaches a junction with the terminus of CR 26 (Garfield Road). Near the junction with Tsatsawassa Lake Road, NY 66 leaves Kinderhook Creek behind permanently, continuing north through the town of Nassau, past Tackawasick Lake and the Tackawasick River before reaching the hamlet of Hoag Corners, where it reaches a junction with CR 16 and CR 21 (Dunham Hollow Road). Crossing the Tackawasick River, NY 66 continues north out of Hoag Corners and past Pikes Pond. At the northern end of Pikes Pond, NY 66 reaches a junction with CR 20 (Totem Lodge Road). Just north of that junction, the route enters the hamlet of Denault Corners, where it meets with NY 43.

Now concurrent, NY 43 and NY 66 continue northwest through Denault Corners as a two-lane residential street as it crosses into the town of Sand Lake. The routes run northward along the eastern shores of Crooked Lake and past a junction with CR 49 (Eastern Union Turnpike). Soon Crooked Lake gives way to Glass Lake, which is bordered with lakeside homes near NY 43 and NY 66. Just before crossing Glass Lake Road, the routes turn northwest again, crossing into the hamlet of Sand Lake, where they reach a junction with CR 42 (Taborton Road). At this junction, NY 43 forks to the west, while NY 66 continues northwest out of Sand Lake as Miller Hill Road.

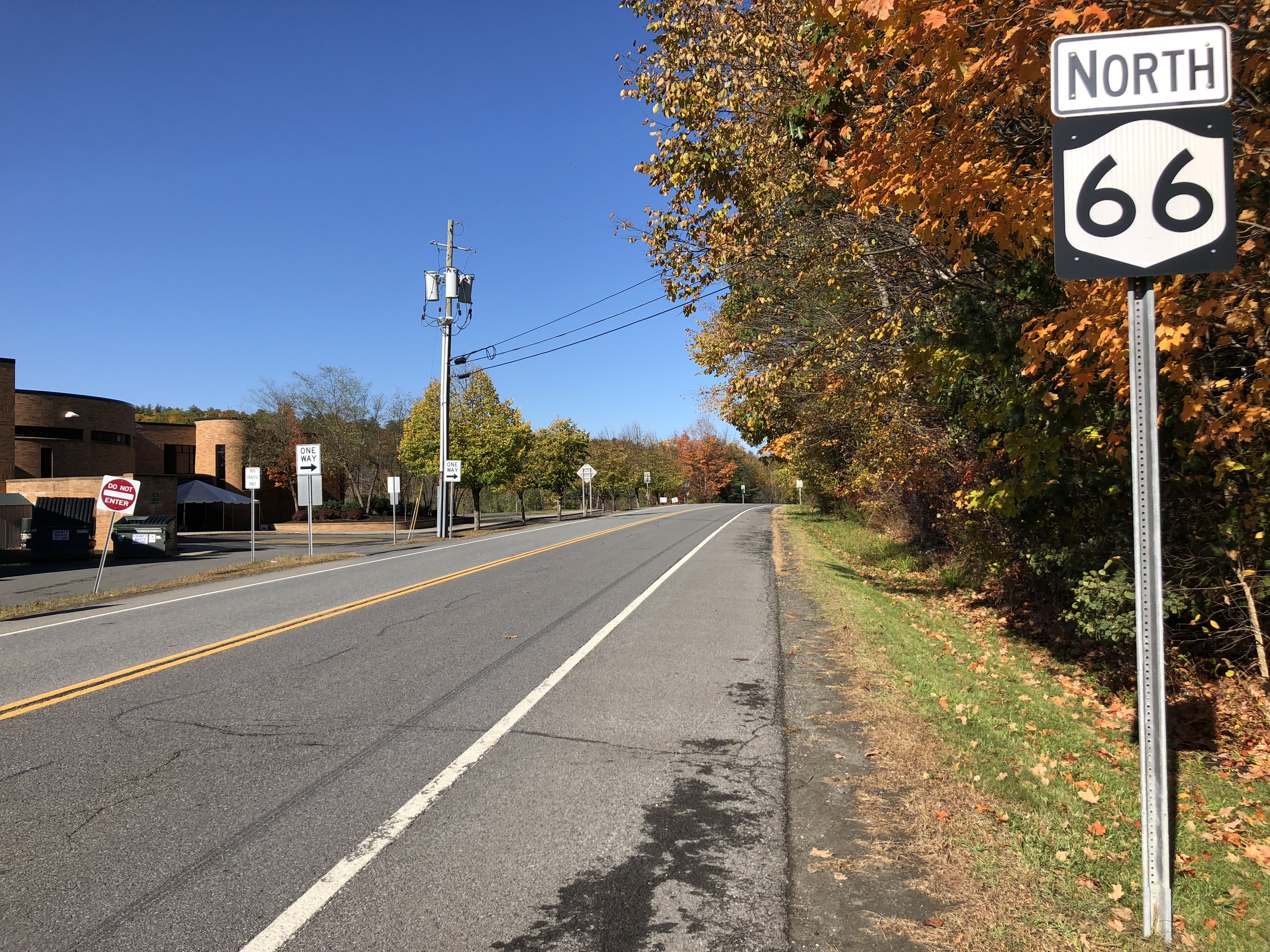
NY 66 northbound past NY 43 and CR 42 in Sand Lake

Crossing northwest through the residential section of Sand Lake on Miller Hill, NY 66 soon leaves the town of Sand Lake for the town of Poestenkill. Along this northwestern stretch, NY 66 drops the Miller Hill Road moniker, crossing a junction with NY 351 (Reichards Lake Road / Round Top Road). A short distance after NY 351, the route returns to the rural nature it once had, crossing a junction with CR 68 (Snyders Corner Road). Winding northwest past a large quarry, NY 66 reaches the western terminus of NY 355 as it enters the town of North Greenbush. Now known as Main Avenue, NY 66 crosses into the hamlet of Wynantskill.

Through Wynantskill, NY 66 becomes the main two-lane west–east street through the community, passing Evergreen Cemetery and a junction with the northern terminus of NY 150 (West Sand Lake Road). Remaining a two-lane commercial street, NY 66 continues west along Main Avenue along the Wyants Kill before leaving North Greenbush for the city of Troy. Upon entering Troy, NY 66 crosses the southern terminus of CR 142 (Mountain View Avenue). Passing through the Albia section of Troy, the route runs northwest along Pawling Avenue, remaining a two-lane residential street for a distance through Troy.

At the junction with Pinewoods Avenue and passing south of Ida Lake, NY 66 turns north past Mount Ida Cemetery and crosses the Poesten Kill before reaching a junction with NY 2 (Congress Street). This junction marks the northern terminus of NY 66 just south of the Rensselaer Polytechnic Institute and southeast of downtown Troy.

== History ==
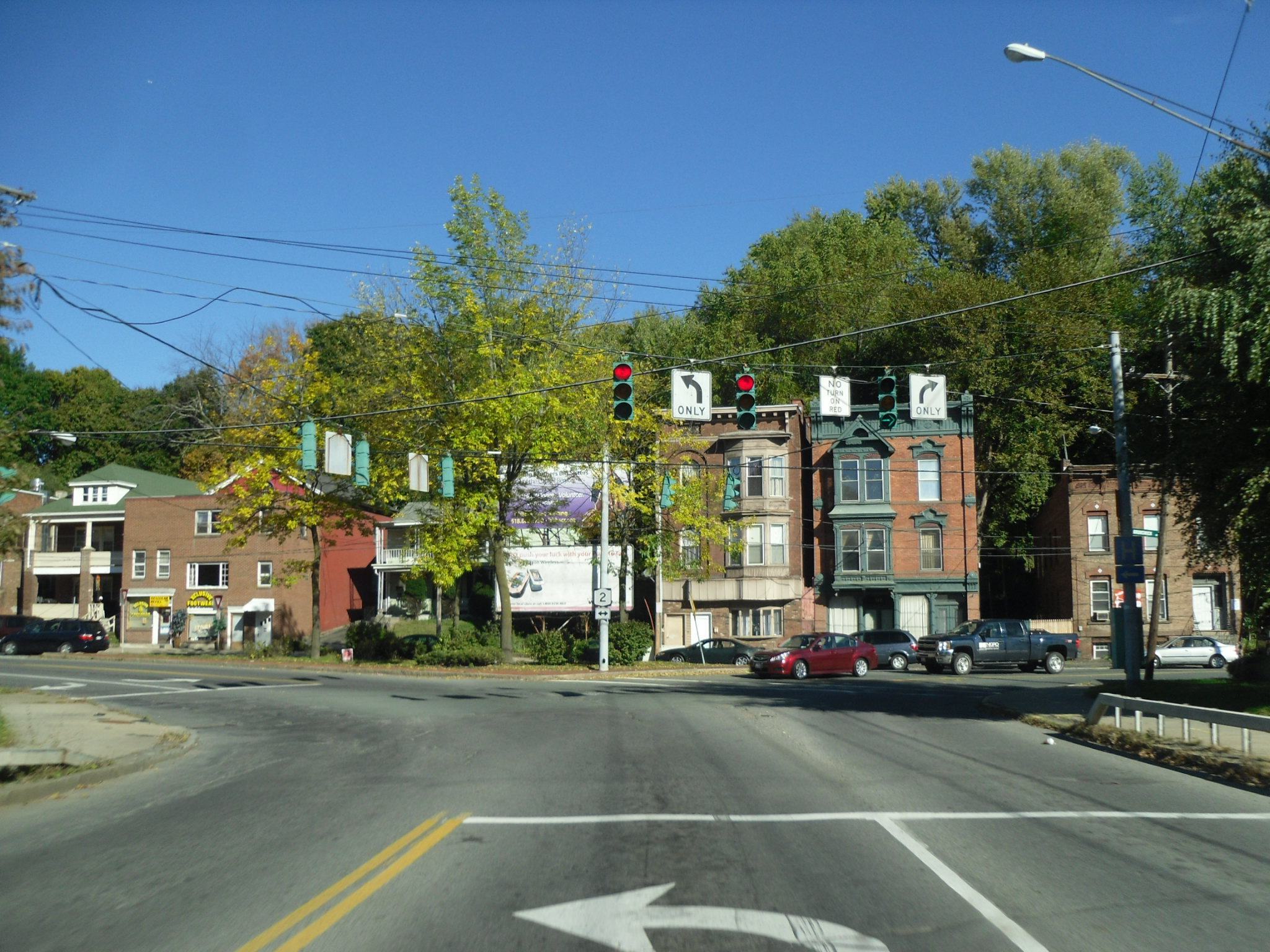
NY 66 northbound at the junction with NY 2 in Troy

When the New York State Legislature assigned Route 21, an unsigned legislative route, in 1908, it followed modern CR 15 and CR 51 between Averill Park and the village of Nassau. The route was realigned on March 1, 1921, to use what is now NY 66 between Averill Park and current US 20 instead. This leg of Route 21 was included in NY 66 when it was assigned in the mid-1920s. At the time, NY 66 began at NY 23 in Claverack and followed modern NY 217 to Mellenville (west of Philmont). Here, NY 66 turned onto what is now CR 9 and proceeded north to Ghent, where it joined its modern alignment. On its north end, NY 66 originally ended at NY 45 (now NY 43) just south of the Sand Lake town line. The remainder of modern NY 66 north to Troy was part of NY 45, which was assigned around the same time as NY 66 and utilized modern CR 45 in the vicinity of Averill Park.

In the 1930 renumbering of state highways in New York, the NY 45 designation was reassigned elsewhere in the state while its former routing was split up into several routes. One of these was NY 66, which was extended northward over former NY 45 to Troy. NY 66 was altered c. 1933 to follow Union Turnpike southwest from Ghent to Hudson, bypassing Claverack and Philmont to the west. On April 1, 1980, ownership and maintenance of NY 66 between NY 43 in Averill Park and then-CR 48 (Miller Hill Road) north of the hamlet was transferred from the state of New York to Rensselaer County as part of a highway maintenance swap between the two levels of government. One of the highways the state received in exchange was CR 48, a northerly bypass of Averill Park that began at NY 43 and NY 66 in the hamlet of Sand Lake and went northwest around Averill Park to NY 66 north of the latter hamlet. The new state highway became part of a realigned NY 66 while the route's old alignment into Averill Park became CR 45.

== Major intersections ==
County	Location	mi	km	Destinations	Notes
Columbia	Hudson	0.00	0.00	US 9 (Green Street) / NY 23B to I-90 / Berkshire Connector / I-87 / New York Thruway	Southern terminus
Columbia	Claverack	3.06	4.92	NY 9H to I-90 / Berkshire Connector – Kinderhook, Valatie	Hamlet of Brick Tavern
Columbia	Village of Chatham	12.15	19.55	NY 203 to Taconic State Parkway – Valatie, Austerlitz	Former NY 22
Columbia	Village of Chatham	12.55	20.20	NY 295 east – Canaan	Western terminus of NY 295
Rensselaer	Town of Nassau	24.59	39.57	US 20 west – Nassau, Albany	Southern end of US 20 concurrency
Rensselaer	East Nassau	26.34	42.39	US 20 east – Pittsfield	Northern end of US 20 concurrency; hamlet of Brainard
Rensselaer	Town of Nassau	33.86	54.49	NY 43 east – Stephentown	Southern end of NY 43 concurrency; hamlet of Denault Corners
Rensselaer	Town of Sand Lake	36.82	59.26	NY 43 west – Rensselaer, Albany	Northern end of NY 43 concurrency; hamlet of Sand Lake
Rensselaer	Town of Poestenkill	39.64	63.79	NY 351 – West Sand Lake, Poestenkill	
Rensselaer	North Greenbush	42.33	68.12	NY 355 east – Poestenkill	Western terminus of NY 355
Rensselaer	North Greenbush	43.29	69.67	NY 150 south – West Sand Lake	Northern terminus of NY 150; hamlet of Wynantskill
Rensselaer	Troy	46.30	74.51	NY 2 (Congress Street)	Northern terminus
1.000 mi = 1.609 km; 1.000 km = 0.621 mi: Concurrency terminus
