= Brainard, New York =

- Hamlet
- Location within New York Location within the United States
- Coordinates: 42°29′45″N 73°30′43″W
- Country: United States
- State: New York
- County: Rensselaer
- Elevation: 679 ft (207 m)
- Time zone: UTC-5 (Eastern (EST))
  - Summer (DST): UTC-4 (EDT)
- ZIP code: 12024
- Area codes: 518 & 838
- GNIS feature ID: 944601

Brainard is a hamlet in the town of in the Village of East Nassau, Rensselaer County, New York, United States. The community is located along U.S. Route 20 and New York State Route 66 5.2 miles (8.4 km) east-south east of the village of Nassau. Brainard has a post office with ZIP code 12024, which opened on April 7, 1881.

The community was named after David Brainerd, a Christian missionary to local Indians.
