= Averill Park Central School District =

School district in New York, United States

Address
- 146 Gettle Road Averill Park, New York, 12018; United States

District information
- Type: Public school district
- Grades: K—12
- Superintendent: James Franchini
- NCES District ID: 3600016

Students and staff
- Students: 2,670 (2021–22)
- Faculty: 185.17 (on an FTE basis)
- Staff: 259.33 (on an FTE basis)
- Student–teacher ratio: 14.42
- District mascot: Golden Knights
- Colors: Blue and gold

Other information
- Website: averillpark.k12.ny.us

Averill Park Central School District (APCSD) is a suburban and rural fringe public school district located east of the city of Rensselaer in south central Rensselaer County, New York. The district has five operating school buildings: three elementary schools, one Middle school, and one high school. The district is a member of the Rensselaer-Columbia-Greene Boards of Cooperative Educational Services (BOCES), known as Questar III.

== Geography ==
The district serves ten towns in Rensselaer County and encompasses roughly 120 square miles (310 km^{2}) in the towns of Berlin, Brunswick, East Greenbush, Grafton, Nassau, North Greenbush, Poestenkill, Sand Lake, Schodack, and Stephentown.

== Administration ==
=== Board of education ===
The Board of education (BOE) is the authoritative legislative body of the school district. It approves policy and funding; sets committees and district priorities; and approves employment (including the superintendent) within the district, among other things. The BOE is made up of seven members. Until 2006-07-01, each member served for five years. Members elected after that date now serve three-year terms.

As of 2022 the members of the BOE, with the end of their terms noted in parentheses, are:

- Jessica Zweig President (2024)
- Samantha Hicks Vice President (2025)
- Jacqueline Geraci (2024)
- Douglas Kelley (2023)
- Meghan McGarry (2025)
- Ann Morone (2023)
- Adam Stewart (2025)

=== Superintendent ===
James Franchini is the superintendent of schools. The superintendent is the chief administrative officer of the district and is responsible for the day-to-day operations of the district in addition to administering policies of the board.

== Schools ==
The district is served by three elementary schools: Miller Hill, Poestenkill, and West Sand Lake Elementary Schools. The former George Washington and Sand Lake Elementary Schools were closed in June 2010 amid budget difficulties, although the Sand Lake Elementary School's land was kept by the district until January 2015. Algonquin Middle School (grades 6-8) and Averill Park High School are the lone middle and high schools of the district, respectively.

=== Elementary schools ===
In the district, there are three elementary schools: Miller Hill Elementary School (Sometimes referred to as Miller Hill-Sand Lake Elementary School; Near State Route 66), West Sand Lake Elementary School (Near the West Sand Lake town center), and Postenkill Elementary School (Near the Postenkill Town Center). There were two former elementary schools that have since shut down due to budget issues: Sand Lake Elementary School (Located next to Miller Hill Elementary school) and George Washington School (Located west of Postenkill). All of the elementary schools teach K-5, however (due to their close proximity) Sand Lake Elementary once taught grades 4-5 while Miller Hill would teach K-3.

=== Algonquin Middle School ===
Algonquin Middle School is the only middle school in the entire district. The school was founded in 1967.

== School-Run Activities ==
=== Sports ===
The District offers competitive sports for grades 7 to 12 with levels modified, junior varsity, and Varsity. Sports Include Baseball, Softball, Football, Volleyball, Wrestling, Track and field, Cross country running, Bowling, and Soccer. The district-wide team name is The Warriors.

=== Band, Orchestra, and Chorus ===
The middle and high school offers Band (i.e., learning a brass, woodwind, or percussion instrument), Orchestra (i.e., learning violin, viola, cello, or double bass), and Chorus (i.e., singing in a choir) while the elementary schools begin instruction in 5th grade. All of the music groups perform concerts. The high school and middle school also offer Jazz Ensemble for more motivated Band students, and the high school offers Treble Choir. Students can be a part of Band and Chorus or Orchestra and Chorus, and although more difficult to schedule, students can be in both Band and Orchestra.

=== Clubs ===
The middle and high schools both sponsor school-run clubs. These include the GSA, Debate Club, School Newspaper Club, and others. Clubs are typically run by one teacher or a group of teachers and are sponsored by the school.

== See also ==
- New York State Education Department
- University of the State of New York
- New York Regents Examinations
- List of school districts in New York
- New York State School Boards Association
- National School Boards Association
- No Child Left Behind Act
