= Dyken Pond =

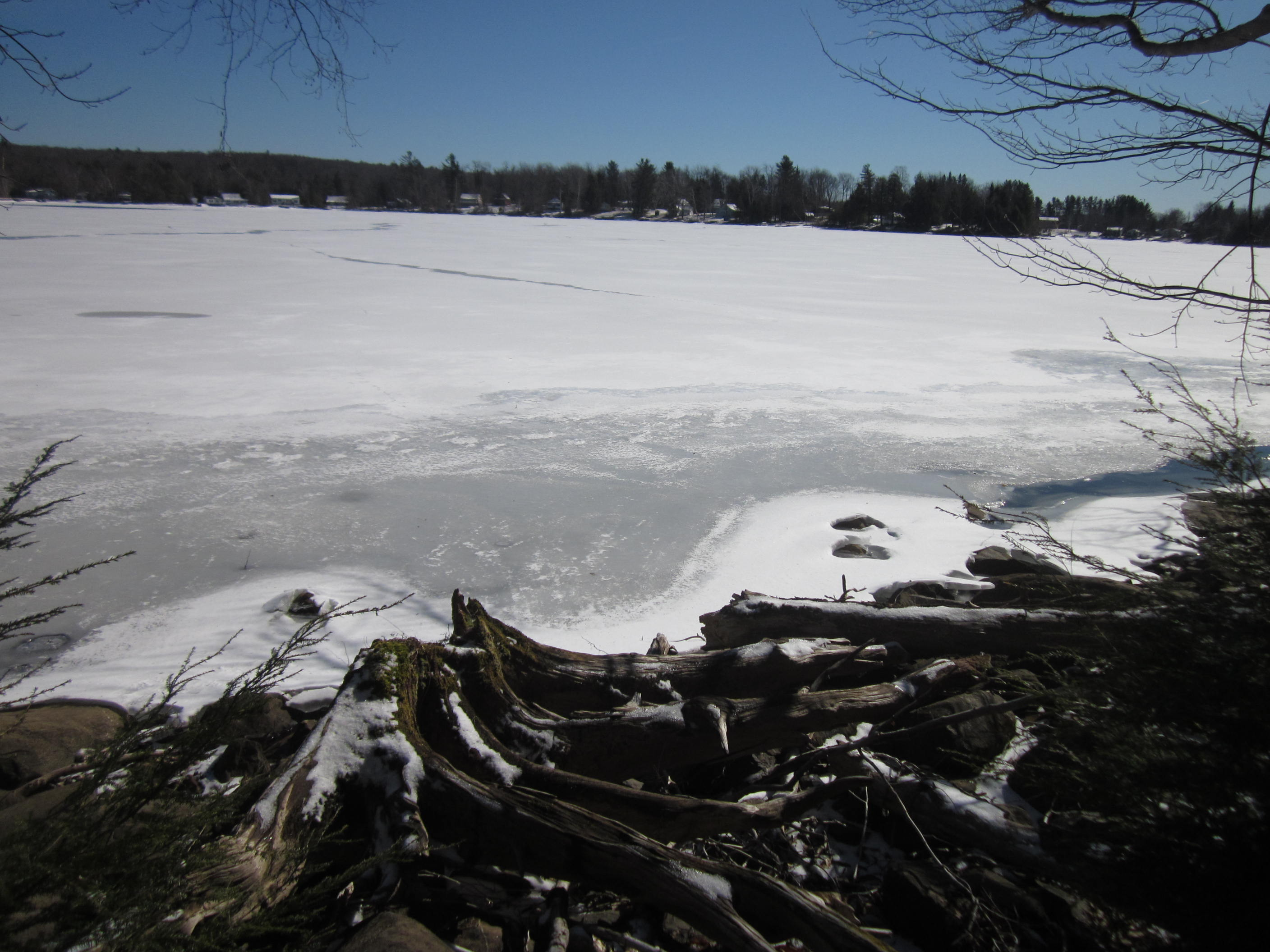
- The frozen lake in 2012

- Location in New York
- Location: Towns of Grafton and Berlin, Rensselaer County, New York
- Coordinates: 42°43′24″N 73°25′32″W
- Type: Lake
- Primary outflows: Poesten Kill
- Max. length: 1.4 mi (2.3 km)
- Surface area: 134 acres (54 ha)
- Average depth: 16 ft (4.9 m)
- Max. depth: 35 ft (11 m)
- Shore length^{1}: 5.1 mi (8.2 km)
- Surface elevation: 1,625 ft (495 m)
- ^{1} Shore length is not a well-defined measure.

Dyken Pond is a 134-acre (54 ha) lake in the towns of Grafton and Berlin in Rensselaer County, New York. The pond gets water primarily from precipitation and outflows westward into the Poesten Kill, a tributary of the Hudson River. It is primarily located in northwest Berlin, south of Grafton Lakes State Park.

Dyken Pond is 1.4 miles (2.3 km) long with a shoreline length of 5.1 miles (8.2 km); its maximum depth is 35 feet (11 m) with an average depth of 16 feet (4.9 m). It sits at an elevation of 1,625 feet (495 m).

Formerly a small pond, Dyken Pond was enlarged to its current size in 1902 after a dam was built to regulate water power and reduce flooding. The dam was constructed by the Manning Paper Company, who later donated their land holdings in the vicinity of the pond to Rensselaer County in 1973. That land became part of the Dyken Pond Environmental Education Center, a 594-acre (2.40 km^{2}) property that is accessible to the public for the purpose of outdoor education and low-impact recreation.

The pond facilitates fishing for chain pickerel and panfish, and ice fishing is permitted.
