= Poesten Kill =

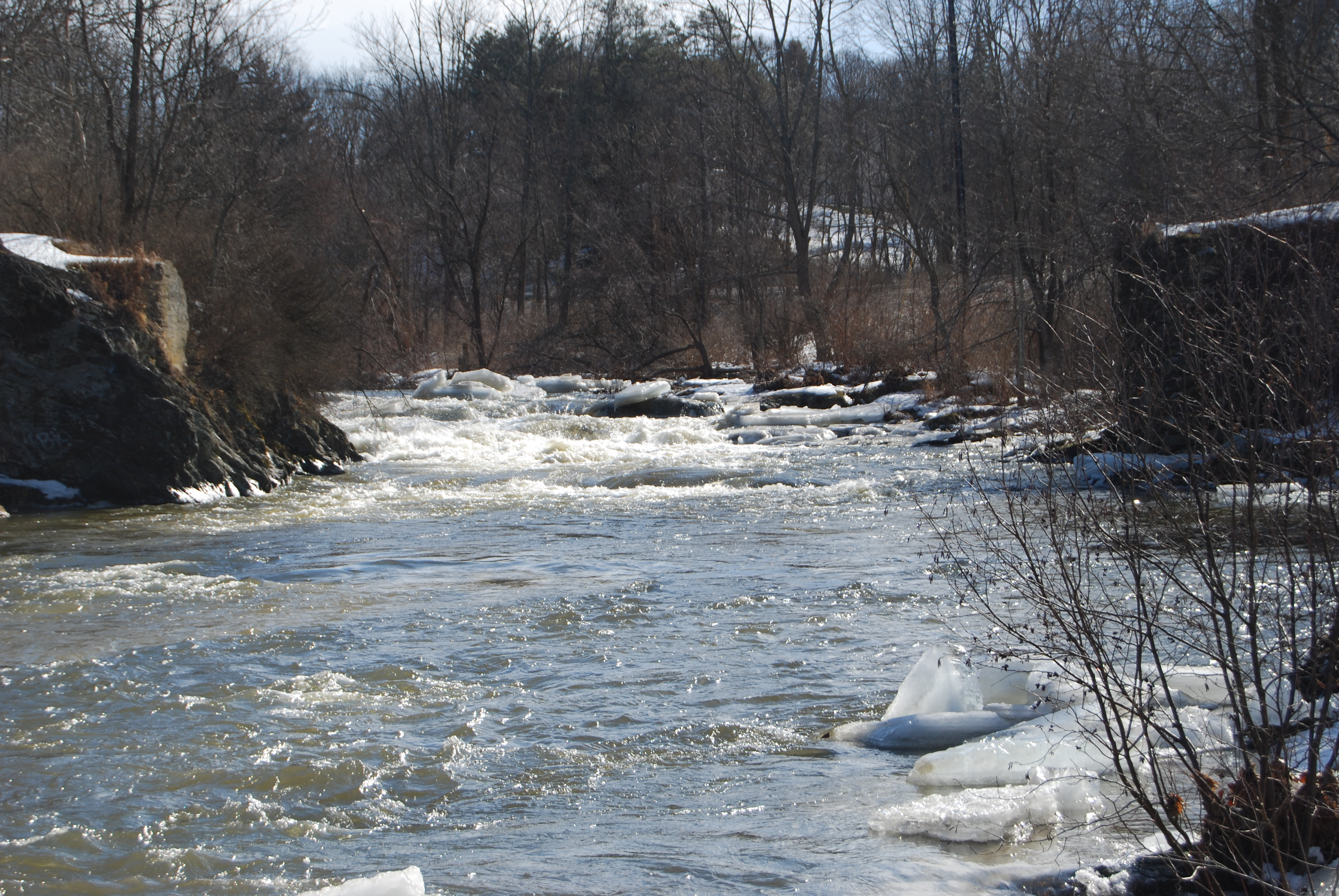
- Poesten Kill adjacent to New York Route 2 in Brunswick

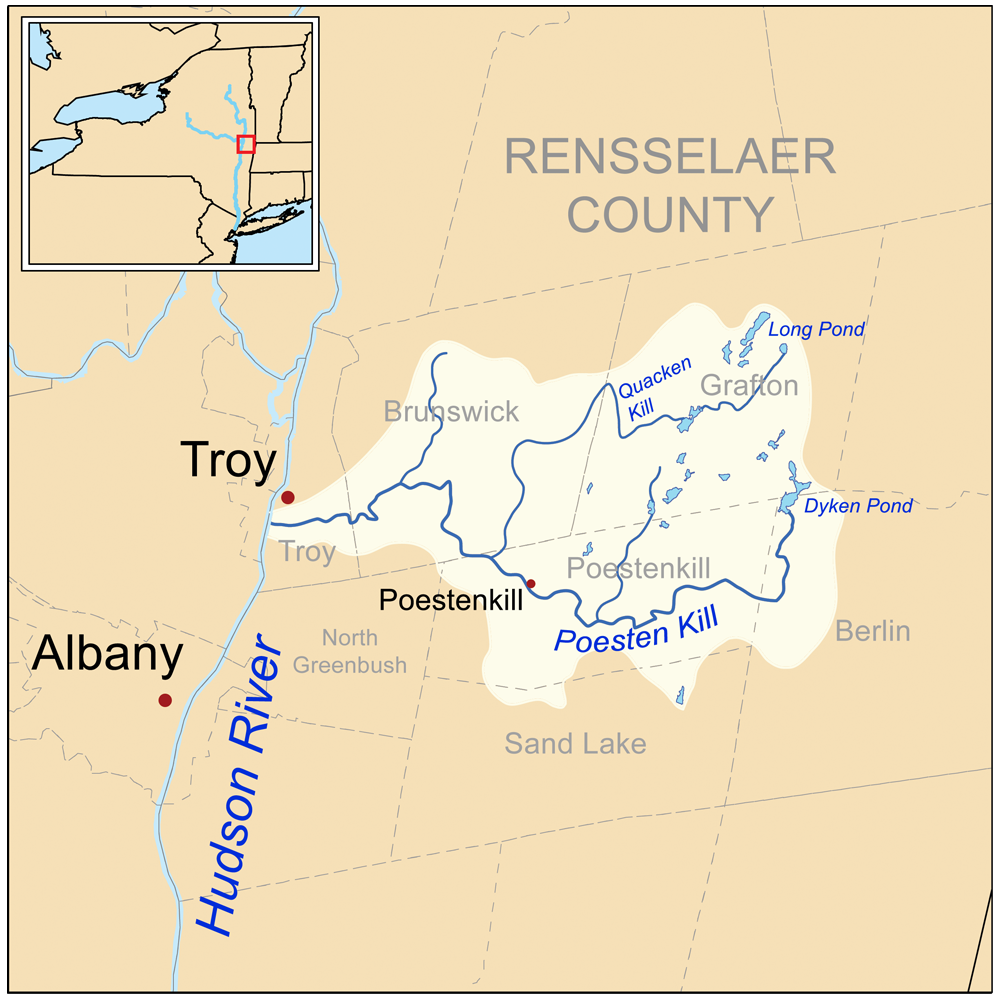
- Watershed of the Poesten Kill and its tributaries

Location
- Country: United States
- State: New York
- Region: Rensselaer County

Physical characteristics
- Source: Dyken Pond
  - location: Berlin, New York, United States
  - coordinates: 42°43′2.74″N 73°25′40.58″W
  - elevation: 1,624 ft (495 m)
- Mouth: Hudson River
  - location: Troy, New York, United States
  - coordinates: 42°43′14.49″N 73°41′54″W
  - elevation: 0 ft (0 m)
- Length: 26.2 mi (42.2 km)
- Basin size: 89.4 sq mi (232 km^{2})
- Discharge
  - average: 130 cu ft/s (3.7 m^{3}/s)
  - maximum: 2,897 cu ft/s (82.0 m^{3}/s)

Basin features
- River system: Hudson River Watershed
- Tributaries
  - left: Newfoundland Creek
  - right: Bonesteel Creek, Quacken Kill, Sweet Milk Creek

The Poesten Kill is a 26.2-mile-long (42.2 km) creek in Rensselaer County, Upstate New York. It flows westerly from its source at Dyken Pond, located in the town of Berlin, to its mouth at the Hudson River in the city of Troy. The creek was historically used as a source of water for the local farmers and residents. During the Industrial Revolution, the creek became an important source of water power, and many mills and factories sprung up along its banks.

The name of the creek is derived from a local farmer and miller, Jan Barensten Wemple, who lived near it in the 1660s. He was known by the nickname "Poest"; kille was a Dutch word for "waterway".

== Geography ==
The Poesten Kill begins at Dyken Pond, a man-made body of water located in the hamlet of Cropseyville, NY, about 20 miles (32 km) east of the Hudson River. The Manning Paper Company created the lake in 1902 to control stream flow and prevent flooding. Dyken Pond is fed by local streams and springs and is located near the corners of the towns of Grafton, Berlin, and Poestenkill at an elevation of 1,624 feet (495 m).

While many small streams discharge into the Poesten Kill, there are only four notable tributaries of the creek. Bonesteel Creek runs southerly from Bonesteel and Hosjord Ponds and connects with the Poesten Kill in the town of Poestenkill between the hamlets of Barberville and Ives Corner. (Note: 42°40′43.71″N 73°31′45.38″W) Bonesteel Creek is about 5.4 miles (8.7 km) long. Newfoundland Creek is the next tributary and joins the Poesten Kill just west of the hamlet of Poestenkill. It is about 3.6 miles (5.8 km) long. The Quacken Kill is the next tributary and connects in the town of Poestenkill near the Brunswick border. (Note: 42°42′17.25″N 73°35′1.13″W) The Quacken Kill begins at Long Pond at Grafton Lakes State Park and continues through Second Pond and Mill Pond, also in the park, before continuing through Dunham Reservoir near central Grafton. It is about 15.9 miles (25.6 km) long. The next major tributary is Sweet Milk Creek, which begins as a stream in north central Brunswick and travels about 4.7 miles (7.6 km) before combining in the southwestern portion of the town. (Note: 42°44′3.77″N 73°37′46.59″W)

The Poesten Kill travels about 26.2 miles (42.2 km) through Rensselaer County before flowing into the Hudson River.

Between 1924 and 1968, and at a location between Eagle Mills and Troy, (Note: 42°43′58.15″N 73°37′54.63″W) the Poesten Kill saw an average of 130 cu ft/s (3.7 m^{3}/s) in flow. It saw an average of 2,897 cu ft/s (82.0 m^{3}/s) for peak flow in the same period.

=== Waterfalls ===
There are a number of waterfalls along the course of the Poesten Kill and its tributaries.

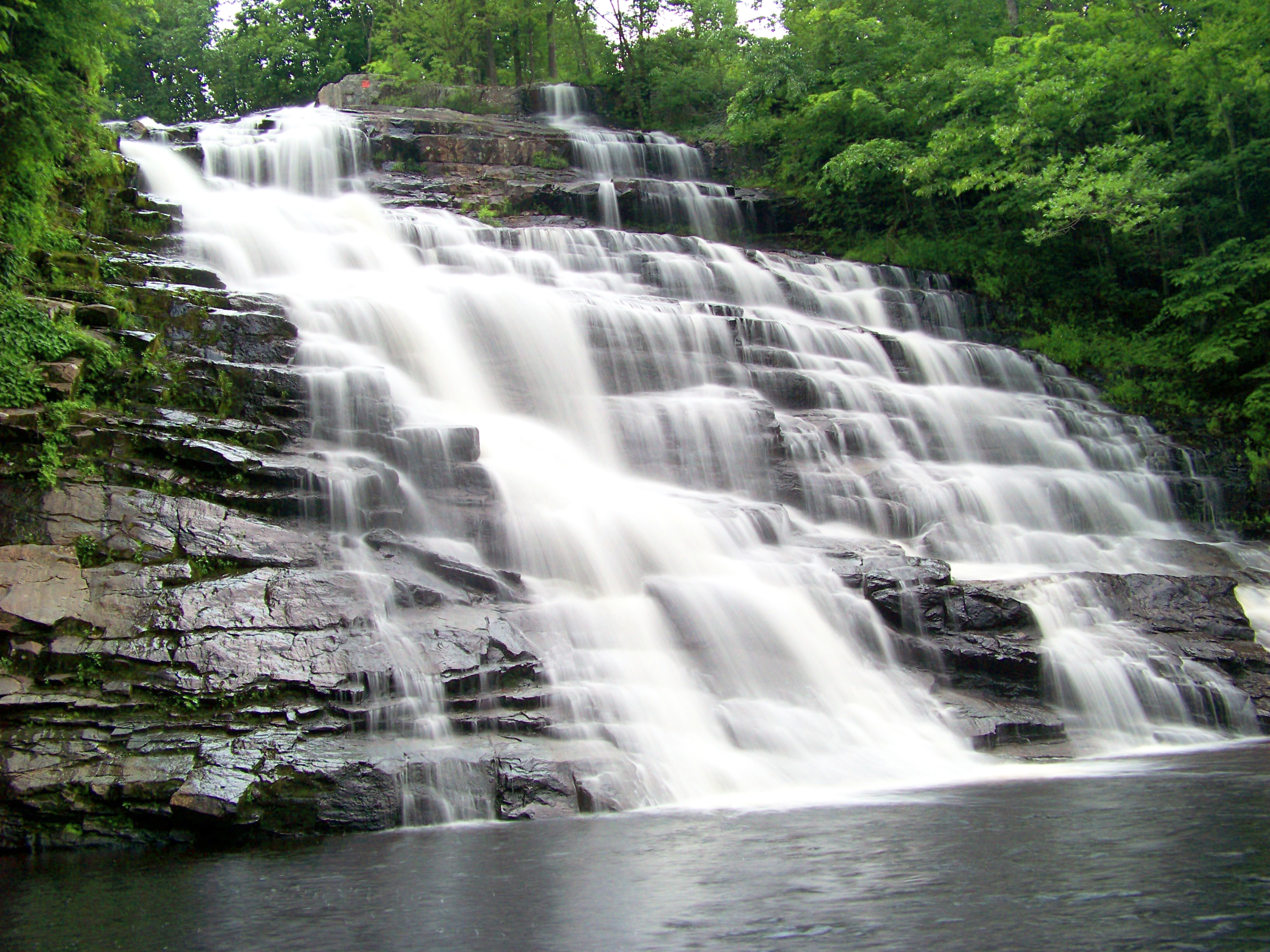
Barberville Falls in Poestenkill

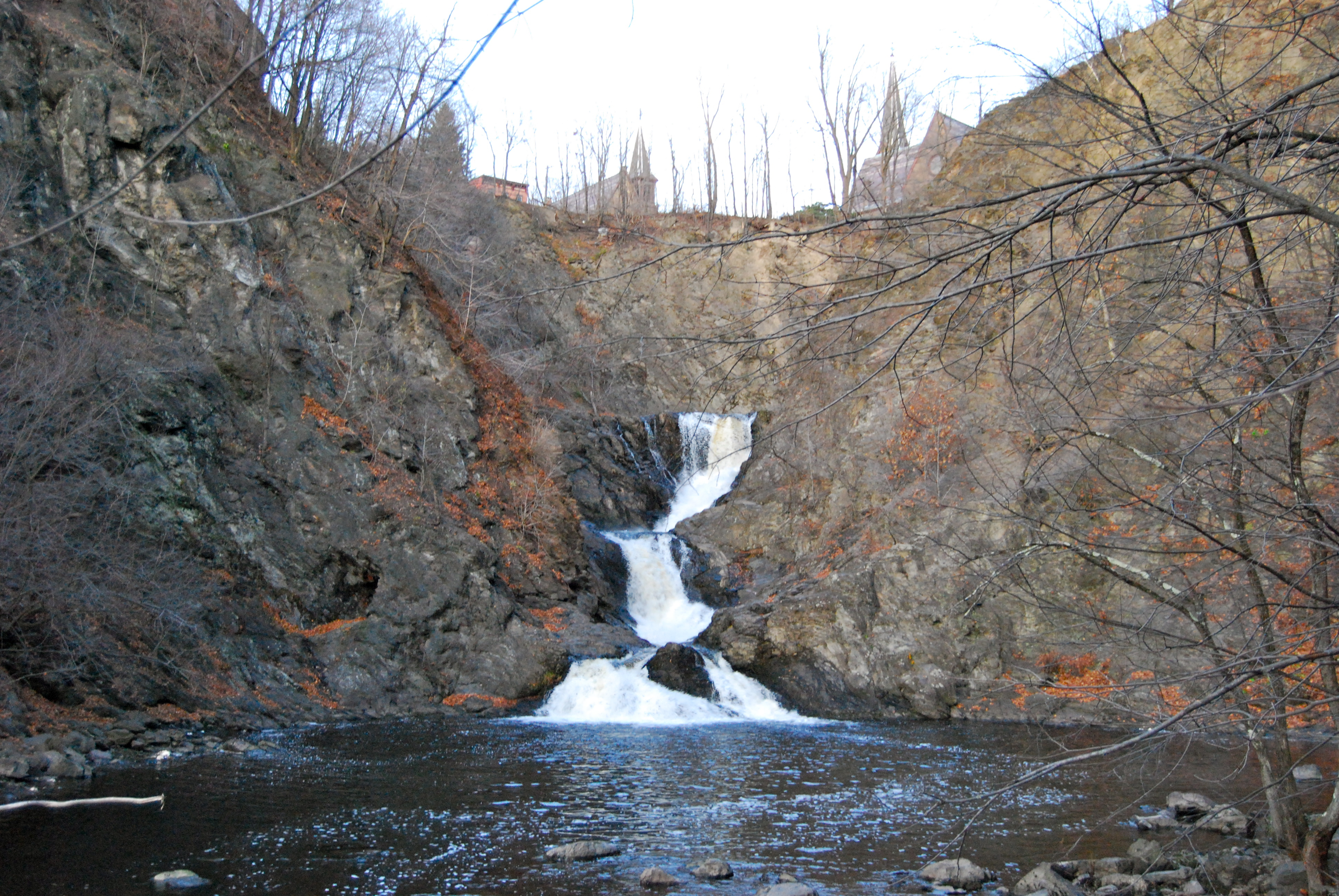
High Falls in Troy

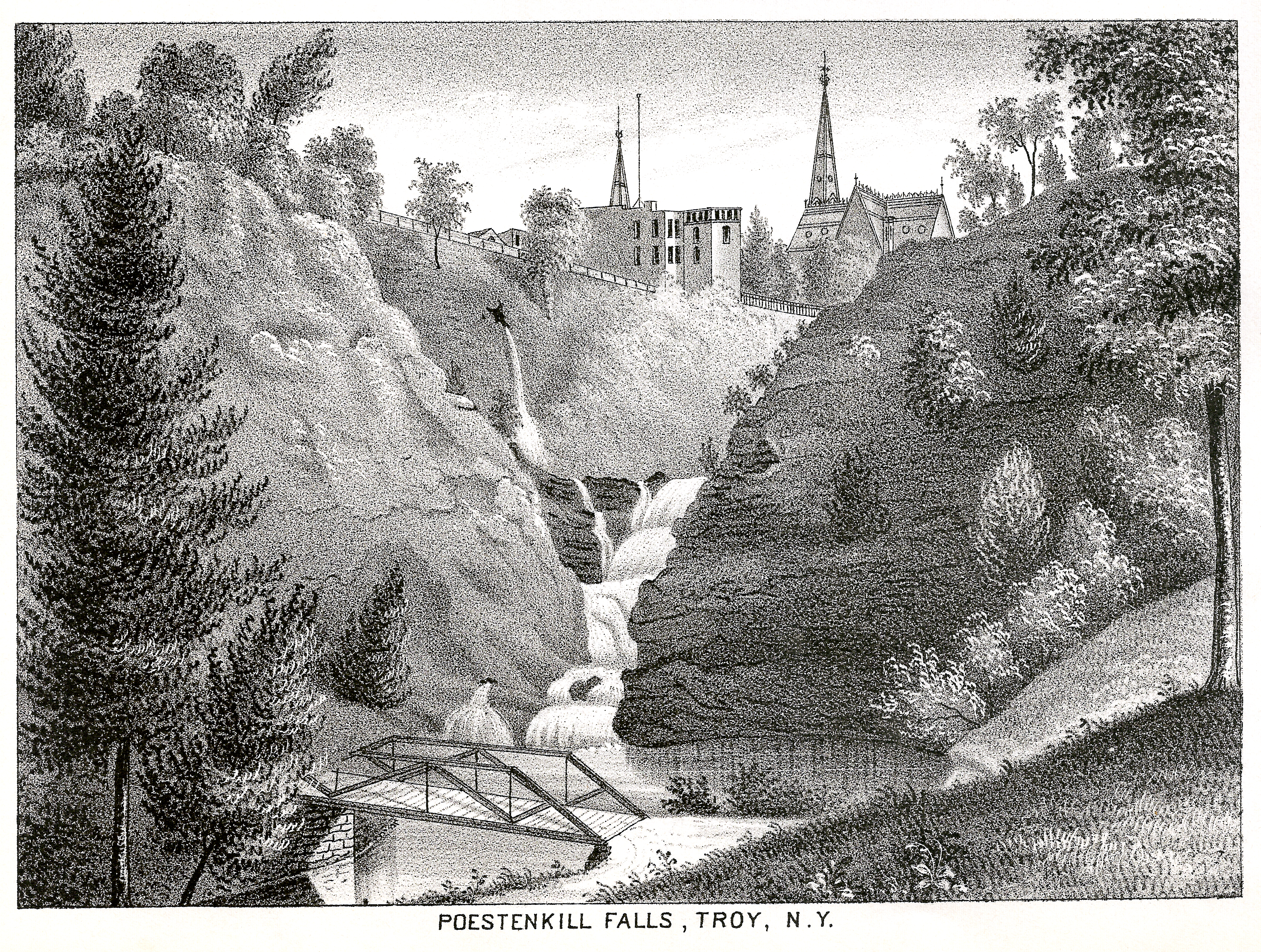
Sketch of High Falls, ca 1880

== History ==
=== The Dutch ===
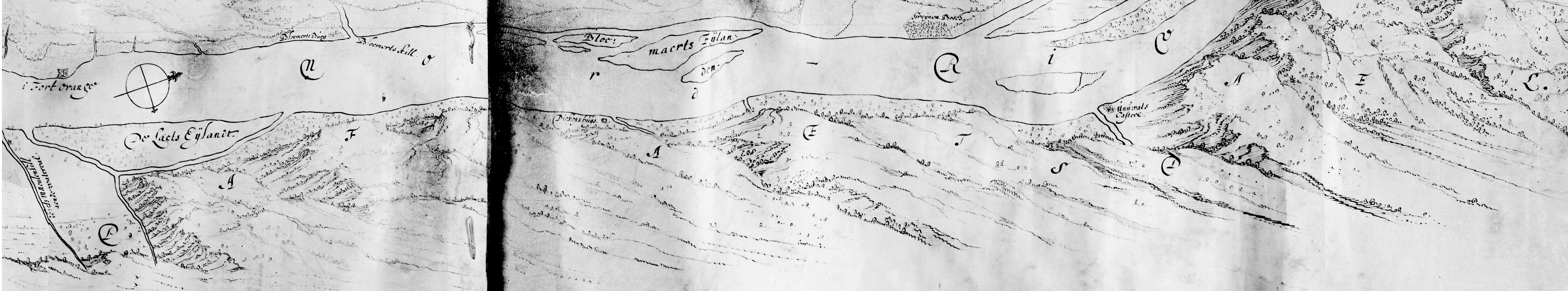
The original map of Rensselaerswyck (1632) features "Pafraets Deal", home to the mouth of the Poesten Kill

Prior to the arrival of Europeans, the Mohicans occupied the land through which the Poesten Kill flows. The first permanent European settlement in the area was Fort Orange, a trading post built by the Dutch West India Company in 1624, about 10 miles (16 km) south of the mouth of the creek. However, the mouth of the Poesten Kill at the Hudson is said to be first genuine European frontier settlement outside the barricades of Fort Orange.

The land making up much of current-day Albany and Rensselaer counties was sold by the Mohicans in 1630 to Kiliaen van Rensselaer, a Dutch merchant and a businessman. With the land, Van Rensselaer began the only successful patroonship – essentially a feudal manor – in the history of the Dutch colonies: Rensselaer wyck. Van Rensselaer named the land surrounding the mouth of the Poesten Kill Pafraets Dael after his mother, Maria Parfait. This can be seen on the first map of Rensselaerswyck, though the Poesten Kill is not identified.

The Dutch can be credited for the source of the creek's name. In 1661, Jan Barentse Wemple, an independent farmer-trader, began a lease for a farm with Jan Baptist van Rensselaer, Kiliaen's oldest son and the patroon at the time. The land extended south from the Poesten Kill to the north bank of the Wynants Kill, which empties into the Hudson in South Troy. At the time, residents would commonly go by a recognizable nickname, to distinguish themselves in local records. Wemp went by "Poest". Add the Dutch word kill, meaning "creek", and the source of the name Poesten Kill becomes clear.

While most of the settlements along or near the Poesten Kill during the Dutch era revolved around farming, some were also based on easy access to the Mohicans for trade in fur. The Indians cut their trip by miles, since they would no longer have to go to Fort Orange. At the time, the fur trade was legally monopolized by the Dutch West India Company, so this practice was illegal but very profitable.

Rensselaer wynk was taken over by the English in 1664, though the legal existence of the patroonship was not challenged.

In the 1600s, a sawmill was built at the base of Poesten Kill falls by Jan Barentsen Wemple and was passed on to his wife, Marytie Mynderse after his death.

In the 1800s, many mills and factories were built along this river to use waterpower or have easy access to the Hudson on a riverside road beginning just after Poesten Kill Falls. This included a bridge that spanned the creek just after the falls, and this bridge is no longer around but remains of the old factories still can be seen along the north side of the river. Small dirt paths are all that is left of the roads on the north side of the creek between the falls and Prospect Park.

== Dangers of the Falls ==
The Poesten Kill Falls serves as a notable destination for public hikers seeking exploration. However, the vicinity poses inherent risks due to its proximity to rapids formed by creek flows post-floods or winter thaws. In February 2017, a young individual fell, was reported missing, and was discovered deceased in the Hudson River two months later. Prior to this incident, less than a year earlier, a 16-year-old had also fallen from the same cliffs, resulting in a fatality. A swimmer lost his life in the Poestenkill Gorge in June 2020.

== The Poestenkill Gorge Today ==
Today, the gorge is located right behind RPI's polytechnic dorm. Alternative names referring to the gorge include Mount Ida Falls, Wire Mill Falls, and Poesten Kill High Falls. It's the largest waterfall found on the Poesten Kill River system, which consists of 6 distinct drops totaling to about 150 feet: the tallest drop at around 30 feet. The average width of the stream is 15 feet with 50 feet being the max in some areas. At the base of the fall, it was mostly pebbles ranging from 1 cm pebbles to large boulders. Also at the base, 10 feet above, there was a hollow cave-like structure that resembled a rock shelter. It can be accessed from the base through climbing and connects to the upper level of the waterfall where pockets of water lie. The upper portion of these falls is viewable almost completely from a private residence up the hill from the park's parking area on Linden Ave. There are some other areas to view the waterfalls from the top of the Gorge off of Rt. 2, uphill from the Cookie Factory.

There are two access points located on each side of the river. A private company has a small power station that still produces electricity from hydropower on the north side of the river that was built in the 1950s and used turbines inside the remains of the concrete foundation of the old industrial mills. A gate blocked the entrance to this access point but it since has been removed. This road existed since the 1870s but had been closed off in the 1990s when the city of Troy discontinued maintenance of this park, even though it still owns the land. This road leads to a small dirt path tangled with saplings and roots along old industrial remains from the Marshall Factories. This dirt path is where the bridge access road used to be, due to the lack of any full-grown trees and a clearing. The path splits into two, one leading towards the sublime foundation of an old mill with one brick archway standing. Along the northern riverbank are stone bricks, shale from mill foundations, clay bricks from the old mill inscribed “Bleau”, and steel rods from where bridges and walkways used to traverse and cross the gorge. The bricks inscribed “Bleau” were made in a brick factory in Mechanicville across the Hudson and used to make up a mill from the 1700s.

Walking along the riverbank provides no adequate places for footing due to the deposits of rubble and driftwood along the banks. One of the sights is the rock walls of the waterfalls that indicate all dirt and clay have been washed away by the constant barrage of water. During the spring, the melting water and a lack of a dam upstream cause the water to flow much more violently. The discharging water is fast and prevents access to most of the waterfall riverbanks. During the winter, the colder weather brings snow cover to much of the surrounding banks, and a thick layer of ice forms across the river. When summer comes, most of the ice from winter has melted and the lower river discharge exposes the banks finally. Students from RPI and the community surrounding the area often come to the gorge to take a drip and relax during the hot summer days.

== See also ==
- List of rivers of New York

== Bibliography ==
- Rensselaer, Kiliaen van; Van Laer, Arnold J. F.; Roever, Nicolaas de; Strong, Susan De Lancey Van Rennselaer (1908). Van Rensselaer Bowier manuscripts, being the letters of Kiliaen Van Rensselaer, 1630-1643, and other documents relating to the colony of Rensselaerswyck. Albany: University of the State of New York. OCLC 9261526. "The Van Rensselaers in Holland and in America."
- Weise, Arthur James (1886). The city of Troy and its vicinity. Troy, New York: Edward Green. OCLC 8989214.
- Warren, John (2009). The Poesten Kill: Waterfalls to Waterworks in the Capital District. Charleston, South Carolina: The History Press. ISBN 978-1-59629-633-6.
