= East Nassau, New York =

East Nassau
- Village
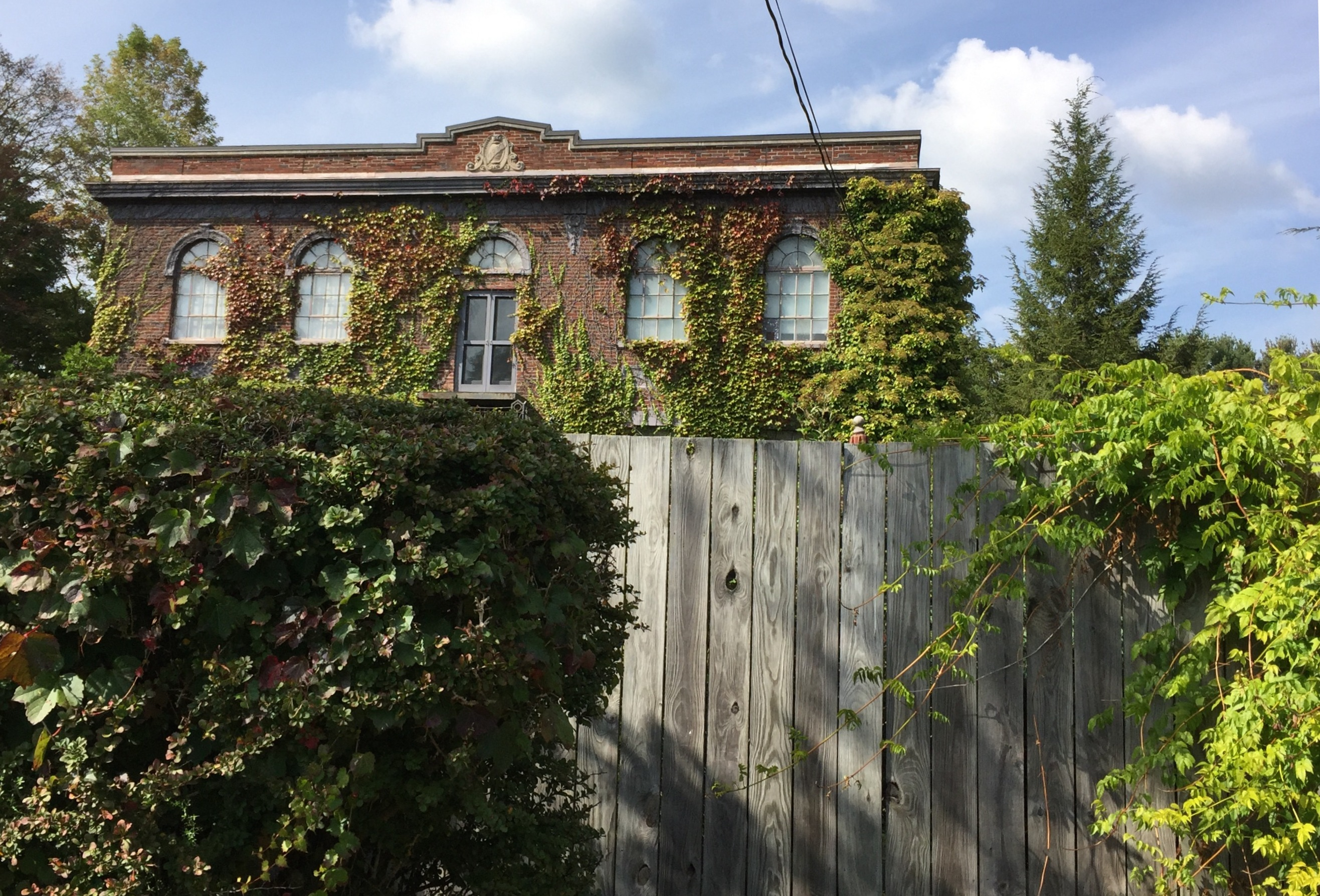
- East Nassau Central School

- Location in Rensselaer County and the state of New York.

- Location within the state of New York
- Coordinates: 42°31′44″N 73°30′58″W
- Country: United States
- State: New York
- County: Rensselaer
- Incorporated: 1998

Area
  - Total: 4.87 sq mi (12.62 km^{2})
  - Land: 4.86 sq mi (12.59 km^{2})
  - Water: 0.0077 sq mi (0.02 km^{2})
- Elevation: 571 ft (174 m)

Population (2020)
  - Total: 559
  - Density: 114.9/sq mi (44.38/km^{2})
- Time zone: UTC-5 (Eastern (EST))
  - Summer (DST): UTC-4 (EDT)
- Area code: 518
- FIPS code: 36-22557
- GNIS feature ID: 0949185
- Website: villageofeastnassau.org/content

East Nassau is a village in Rensselaer County, New York, United States. As of the 2020 census, East Nassau had a population of 559.

The Village of East Nassau is in the eastern section of the town of Nassau along the Town of Stephentown border by Routes 20 and 66.

== History ==
The community was first known as "Schermerhorn's" after an early inhabitant. East Nassau incorporated as a village in 1998.

The East Nassau Central School was listed on the National Register of Historic Places in 1997.

== Geography ==
East Nassau is located at 42°31′44″N 73°30′58″W (42.528830, -73.515997).

According to the United States Census Bureau, the village has a total area of 4.9 square miles (13 km^{2}), all land.

== Demographics ==
Historical population
Census	Pop.	Note	%±
1870	192		—
1880	88		−54.2%
2000	571		—
2010	587		2.8%
2020	559		−4.8%
U.S. Decennial Census

As of the census of 2000, there were 571 people, 216 households, and 150 families residing in the village. The population density was 116.6 inhabitants per square mile (45.0/km^{2}). There were 255 housing units at an average density of 52.1 units per square mile (20.1 units/km^{2}). The racial makeup of the village was 96.32% White, 0.88% African American, 1.58% Asian, 0.18% from other races, and 1.05% from two or more races. Hispanic or Latino of any race were 0.88% of the population.

There were 216 households, out of which 32.9% had children under the age of 18 living with them, 60.2% were married couples living together, 5.6% had a female householder with no husband present, and 30.1% were non-families. 23.6% of all households were made up of individuals, and 9.3% had someone living alone who was 65 years of age or older. The average household size was 2.64 and the average family size was 3.18.

In the village, the population was spread out, with 28.4% under the age of 18, 4.0% from 18 to 24, 30.1% from 25 to 44, 22.1% from 45 to 64, and 15.4% who were 65 years of age or older. The median age was 38 years. For every 100 females, there were 100.4 males. For every 100 females age 18 and over, there were 96.6 males.

The median income for a household in the village was $42,250, and the median income for a family was $48,125. Males had a median income of $35,750 versus $30,893 for females. The per capita income for the village was $24,740. About 2.7% of families and 7.9% of the population were below the poverty line, including 9.4% of those under age 18 and 6.0% of those age 65 or over.

== Government ==
The village is governed by a mayor-council form of government. The mayor is elected every two years during even number years. Village trustees are elected for two year terms that overlap.

The current mayor is Adam Acquario. Village trustees are Jeff Root, Lydia Davis, Thomas Kernan, and Nick Atchinson (2022).
