= Poestenkill, New York =

Town in Rensselaer County, New York

- Town
- Location in Rensselaer County and the state of New York.
- Coordinates: 42°41′15″N 73°31′17″W
- Country: United States
- State: New York
- County: Rensselaer
- Settled: 1770
- Incorporated: March 2, 1848

Government
  - Town Supervisor: Michelle Garofolo

Area
  - Total: 32.58 sq mi (84.37 km^{2})
  - Land: 32.36 sq mi (83.80 km^{2})
  - Water: 0.22 sq mi (0.57 km^{2})
- Elevation: 928 ft (283 m)

Population (2020)
  - Total: 4,322
- Time zone: UTC-5 (Eastern (EST))
  - Summer (DST): UTC-4 (EDT)
- ZIP code: 12140
- Area code: 518
- FIPS code: 36-58805
- GNIS feature ID: 0979380
- Website: poestenkillny.com

Poestenkill is a town in Rensselaer County, New York, United States. The population was 4,322 at the 2020 census. The town is southeast of Troy and is centrally located in the county.

The town is named after the Poesten Kill, an important stream in the area.

The phrase poesten kil (with only one l) is traditionally said to be Dutch for "foaming water" or "foaming creek". While kil is, indeed, Dutch for "water" or "creek", Dutch dictionaries do not support the claim of poest meaning "foam". It seems more likely that the creek was named after the nickname Poest for the 17th-century local farmer and miller Jan Barentsen Wemp, who had a pimple (poest) or had difficulty breathing (poesten = to breathe); he owned a farm and a mill on the Poestenkil creek.

Among the earliest settlers in the town was Archelaus Lynd. He leased 300 acres (120 ha) of land from the Van Rensselaers and made his first clearing in the area of Hillside Cemetery, which was known as The Lynd Cemetery until about 1900. The Whyland and Ives families were other early settlers.

== History ==
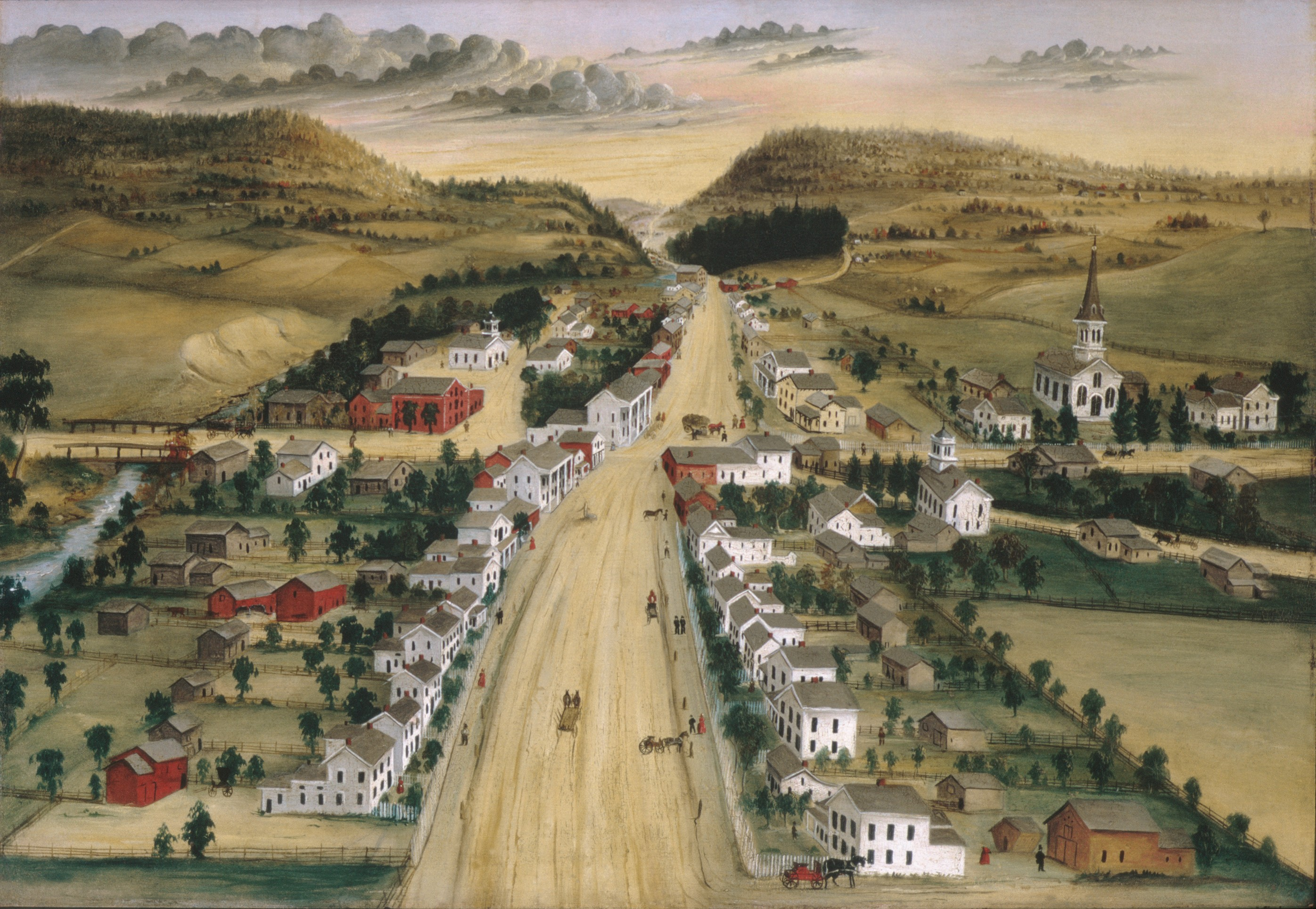
View of Poestenkill by Hadley (c. 1870)

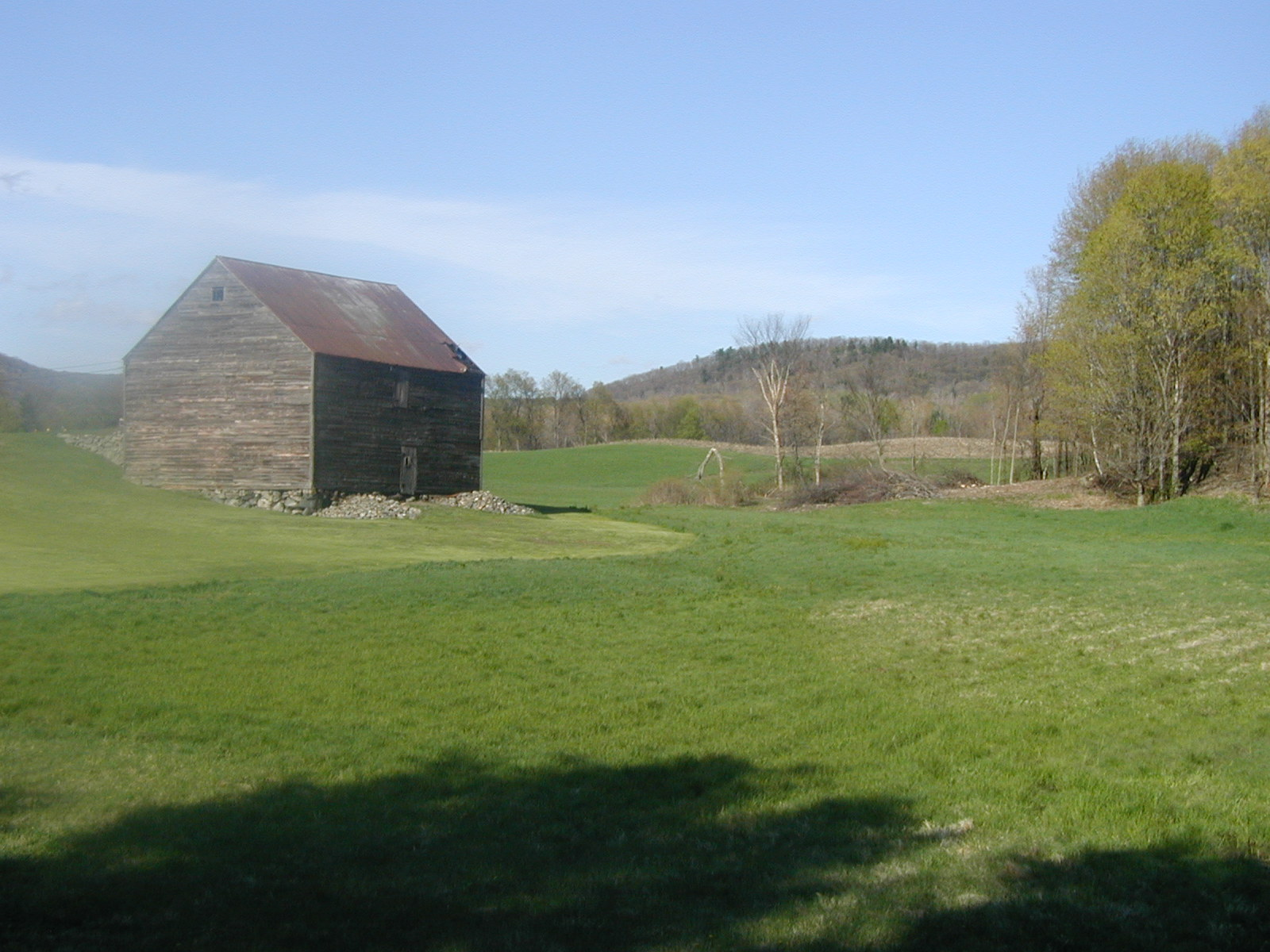
Poestenkill

The area was first settled around 1770, and the town of Poestenkill was created from part of the Town of Sand Lake on March 2, 1848.

When the American Revolutionary War broke out, six men served from the area. One, named Benjamin Cotterel, is said to have carried the first wheelbarrow of earth to Bunker Hill.

The first school in the area was established in or soon after 1788 on land set aside for that purpose by Stephen Van Rensselaer III. Five men from Poestenkill served in the War of 1812, all joining the Eddy expedition.

The first regular church in Poestenkill was the First Baptist church, organized in 1814 and located in East Poestenkill.

During the American Civil War, many of Poestenkill's men served with the Union's forces; twelve who died in action were Daniel M. Horton, Philip Amidon, Daniel Morrison, John Wagoner, George Bradt, Dexter Randall, William H. H. Wood, Martin Larabee, Willard Bailey, W. L. Robbins, George Simmons, and William H. Mason.

Future president James A. Garfield considered a job as high school principal in Poestenkill in 1856, though lost it to another applicant.

Poestenkill celebrated its sesquicentennial (150th anniversary) in 1998, with several events including a Revolutionary War reenactment, antique car show, a parade, and a historical display. A postcard was also produced for the town at the time.

== Geography ==
According to the United States Census Bureau, the town has a total area of 32.6 square miles (84 km^{2}), of which 32.5 square miles (84 km^{2}) is land and 0.1 square miles (0.26 km^{2}) (0.43%) is water.

The eastern and central portions of the town are part of the Rensselaer Plateau.

The town is serviced in part by Brunswick (Brittonkill) Central School District and by Averill Park Central School District.

== Demographics ==
Historical population
Census	Pop.	Note	%±
1850	2,092		—
1860	1,833		−12.4%
1870	1,769		−3.5%
1880	1,672		−5.5%
1890	1,602		−4.2%
1900	1,362		−15.0%
1910	1,078		−20.9%
1920	1,002		−7.1%
1930	1,164		16.2%
1940	1,438		23.5%
1950	1,799		25.1%
1960	2,493		38.6%
1970	3,426		37.4%
1980	3,664		6.9%
1990	3,809		4.0%
2000	4,054		6.4%
2010	4,530		11.7%
2020	4,322		−4.6%
U.S. Decennial Census

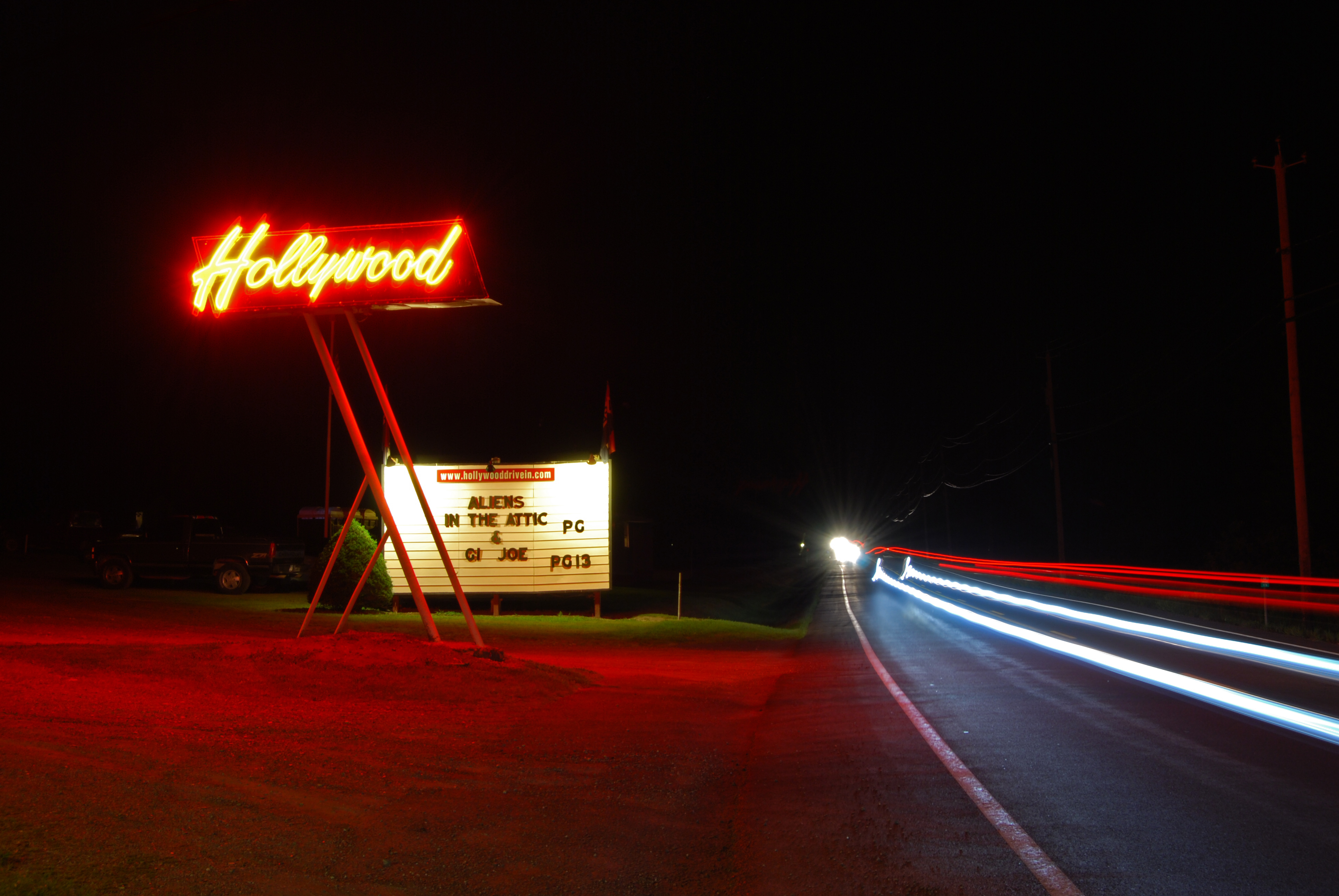
Hollywood Drive In on Route 66

As of the census of 2000, there were 4,054 people, 1,527 households, and 1,137 families residing in the town. The population density was 124.9 inhabitants per square mile (48.2/km^{2}). There were 1,628 housing units at an average density of 50.2 units per square mile (19.4 units/km^{2}). The racial makeup of the town was 98.35% White, 0.17% Blacks and or African American, 0.30% Native American, 0.35% Asian, 0.27% from other races, and 0.57% from two or more races. Hispanic or Latino of any race were 0.67% of the population.

There were 1,527 households, out of which 36.4% had children under the age of 18 living with them, 61.6% were married couples living together, 9.0% had a female householder with no husband present, and 25.5% were non-families. 20.0% of all households were made up of individuals, and 7.6% had someone living alone who was 65 years of age or older. The average household size was 2.64 and the average family size was 3.07.

In the town, the population was spread out, with 26.9% under the age of 18, 6.0% from 18 to 24, 30.6% from 25 to 44, 25.7% from 45 to 64, and 10.8% who were 65 years of age or older. The median age was 38 years. For every 100 females, there were 104.1 males. For every 100 females age 18 and over, there were 100.2 males.

The median income for a household in the town was $58,945, and the median income for a family was $63,819. Males had a median income of $40,128 versus $29,486 for females. The per capita income for the town was $22,143. About 0.5% of families and 1.7% of the population were below the poverty line, including 1.0% of those under age 18 and 3.0% of those age 65 or over.

== Communities and locations in Poestenkill ==
- Barberville – A hamlet southeast of Poestenkill village at the junction of Plank and Blue Factory roads. The community derives its name from a local family.
- East Poestenkill (formerly "Columbia") – A hamlet in the southeastern part of the town at the junction of Plank and Legenbauer roads.
- Ives Corner – A hamlet east of Poestenkill village at the junction of Plank and Columbia Hill roads. The community was named after the local Ives family.
- Poestenkill – The hamlet of Poestenkill at the junction of Routes 68 and 351
- Rensselaer County Airport (5B7) – An airport in the northwestern part of the town. The airport is not large enough to take on any large commercial airplanes, only small privately owned planes.
- Poestenkill Library – A local library connected to the Upper Hudson Library System. This location serves as a community center where town events are held. These events include: singers, book sales, Fourth of July Parties, Children's reading hour, and other events.
- Barberville Falls – A waterfall that connects into the Poestenkill creek. Includes a small trail and views of the waterfall. Swimming is prohibited.

== Sports ==
- Stock car racing – Poestenkill contributed to the rising popularity of auto racing after World War II. In the town's southwest corner, Pine Bowl Speedway, a 1/3-mile (0.54 km) paved oval facility opened to stock cars in 1950. Two miles to its east, Route 66 Speedway (aka Hollywood Speedway), a 1/3-mile (0.54 km) dirt oval began operations in 1952. Along with Carroll's Grove Speedway in the adjoining town of Burnswick and Burden Lake Speedway in the adjoining town of Sand Lake, Rensselaer County became a hub for the sport. Pine Bowl was the longest-lasting of the county’s four tracks, operating through 1966. (Note: Geolocation of Pine Bowl Speedway: 42.6674°N 73.6009°W; Geolocation of Route 66 Speedway: 42.6646°N 73.5786°W)
