= Poestenkill (CDP), New York =

Poestenkill, New York
- CDP
- Location in Rensselaer County and the state of New York.

- Location within the state of New York
- Coordinates: 42°41′45″N 73°33′50″W
- Country: United States
- State: New York
- County: Rensselaer

Area
  - Total: 5.94 sq mi (15.39 km^{2})
  - Land: 5.88 sq mi (15.22 km^{2})
  - Water: 0.066 sq mi (0.17 km^{2})
- Elevation: 479 ft (146 m)

Population (2020)
  - Total: 1,020
  - Density: 173.6/sq mi (67.02/km^{2})
- Time zone: UTC-5 (Eastern (EST))
  - Summer (DST): UTC-4 (EDT)
- ZIP code: 12140
- Area code: 518
- FIPS code: 36-58794
- GNIS feature ID: 0960804

Poestenkill is a hamlet (and census-designated place) in Rensselaer County, New York, United States. The population was 1,061 at the 2010 census. The name is taken from Poesten Kill, a stream in the area.

Poestenkill is in the southern part of the Town of Poestenkill.

== Geography ==
Poestenkill is located at 42°41′44″N 73°33′50″W (42.695815, -73.563912).

The Poesten Kill flows past the community.

According to the United States Census Bureau, the CDP has a total area of 5.9 square miles (15.2 km^{2}), of which 5.8 square miles (15.1 km^{2}) is land and 0.04 square mile (0.1 km^{2}) (0.68%) is water.

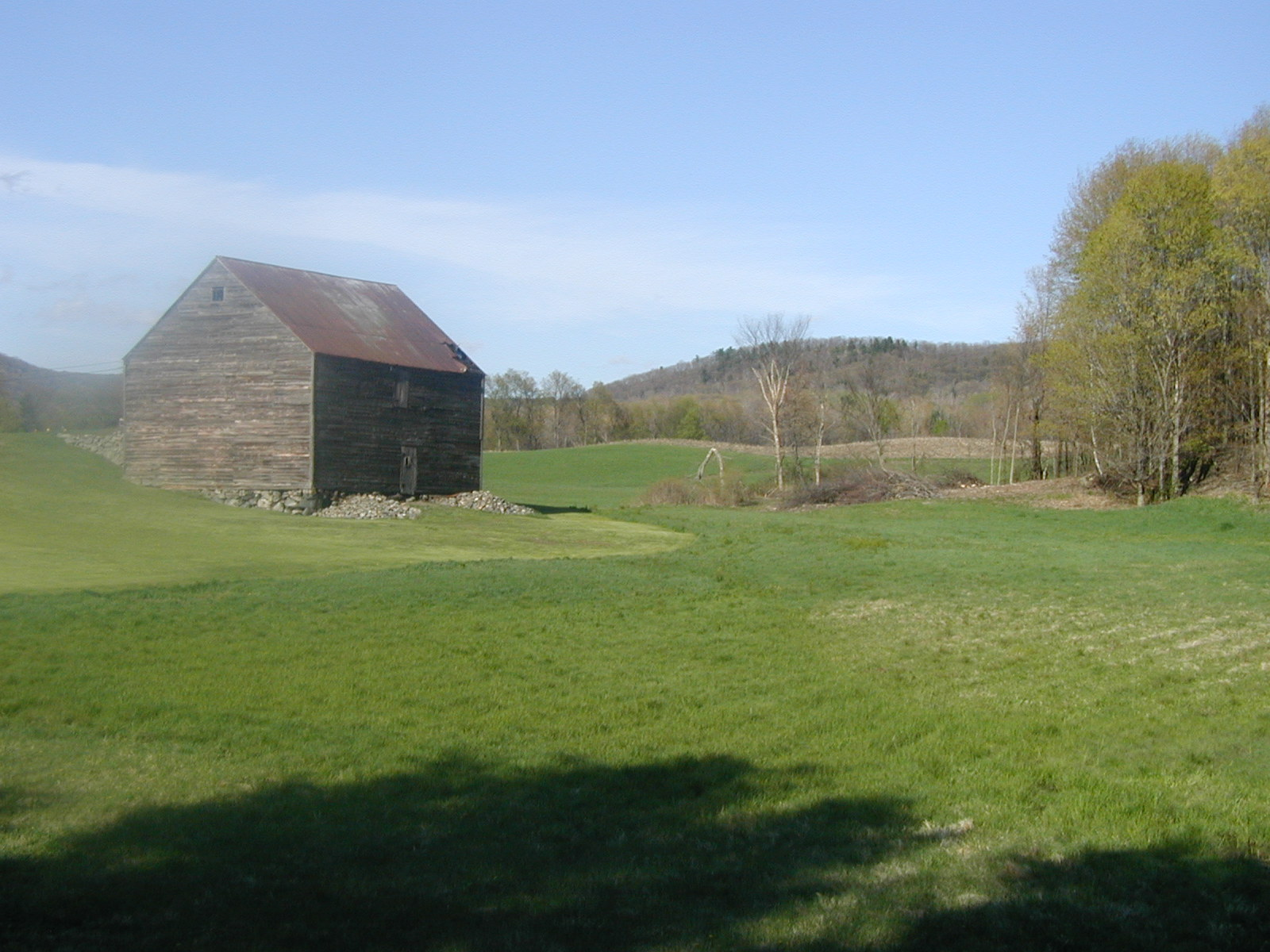
Poestenkill

== Demographics ==
Historical population
Census	Pop.	Note	%±
2020	1,020		—
U.S. Decennial Census

As of the census of 2000, there were 1,024 people, 396 households, and 291 families residing in the CDP. The population density was 175.4 inhabitants per square mile (67.7/km^{2}). There were 426 housing units at an average density of 73.0 per square mile (28.2/km^{2}). The racial makeup of the CDP was 98.54% White, 0.10% Native American, 0.29% Asian, 0.39% from other races, and 0.68% from two or more races. Hispanic or Latino of any race were 0.68% of the population.

There were 396 households, out of which 35.4% had children under the age of 18 living with them, 60.9% were married couples living together, 10.1% had a female householder with no husband present, and 26.3% were non-families. 21.5% of all households were made up of individuals, and 10.6% had someone living alone who was 65 years of age or older. The average household size was 2.59 and the average family size was 3.02.

In the CDP, the population was spread out, with 25.6% under the age of 18, 6.2% from 18 to 24, 29.1% from 25 to 44, 26.9% from 45 to 64, and 12.3% who were 65 years of age or older. The median age was 39 years. For every 100 females, there were 97.3 males. For every 100 females age 18 and over, there were 94.9 males.

The median income for a household in the CDP was $54,219, and the median income for a family was $62,885. Males had a median income of $37,857 versus $30,726 for females. The per capita income for the CDP was $21,946. None of the families and 1.2% of the population were living below the poverty line, including no under eighteens and 3.5% of those over 64.
