= New York State Route 40 =

State highway in eastern New York, US

New York State Route 40
- Map of eastern New York with NY 40 highlighted in red

Route information
- Maintained by NYSDOT, Rensselaer County and the city of Troy
- Length: 54.67 mi (87.98 km)
- Existed: 1930–present

Major junctions
- South end: NY 7 in Troy
- NY 67 in Schaghticoke; NY 29 near Greenwich
- North end: NY 22 in Granville

Location
- Country: United States
- State: New York
- Counties: Rensselaer, Washington

Highway system
- New York Highways; Interstate; US; State; Reference; Parkways
← NY 39	→ NY 41

New York State Route 40 (NY 40) is a north–south state highway in eastern New York in the United States. It is 54.67 miles (87.98 km) long and runs from NY 7 in the city of Troy north to NY 22 in the town of Granville. NY 40 also passes through the villages of Schaghticoke and Argyle and enters the vicinity of the village of Greenwich. It intersects three east–west highways of note: NY 67 just outside Schaghticoke, NY 29 west of Greenwich, and NY 149 in the hamlet of Hartford. Incidentally, NY 40 has overlaps with all three routes.

NY 40 originally extended south to East Greenbush and north to Comstock when it was assigned as part of the 1930 renumbering of state highways in New York. The route was truncated south to NY 149 in Hartford in the early 1940s and north to U.S. Route 4 in North Greenbush in the late 1950s. It was re-extended northward to its current northern terminus in the 1960s, but also truncated northward to its current southern terminus in the early 1970s. In 1980, ownership and maintenance of the portion of NY 40 south of NY 142 and outside of Troy was transferred from the state of New York to Rensselaer County as part of a highway maintenance swap. This section of the route is co-designated and co-signed as County Route 145 (CR 145) and has no reference markers.

== Route description ==
=== Troy to Easton ===
NY 40 begins at an intersection with NY 7 (Hoosick Street) just east of the Collar City Bridge in the city of Troy. NY 40 proceeds north along 10th Street for less than a block, turning northeast along Oakwood Avenue, a two-lane mixed commercial and residential street through the Frear Park section of Troy. Passing the campus of St. Mary's Hospital, the route begins to run along the western edges of the namesake park, reaching an entrance at a junction with Frear Park Road. Running along the western edge of Wright Lake, the route turns northward and soon leaves the western extremities of the park. Now back in the North Central section of Troy, NY 40 runs north through Oakwood Cemetery.

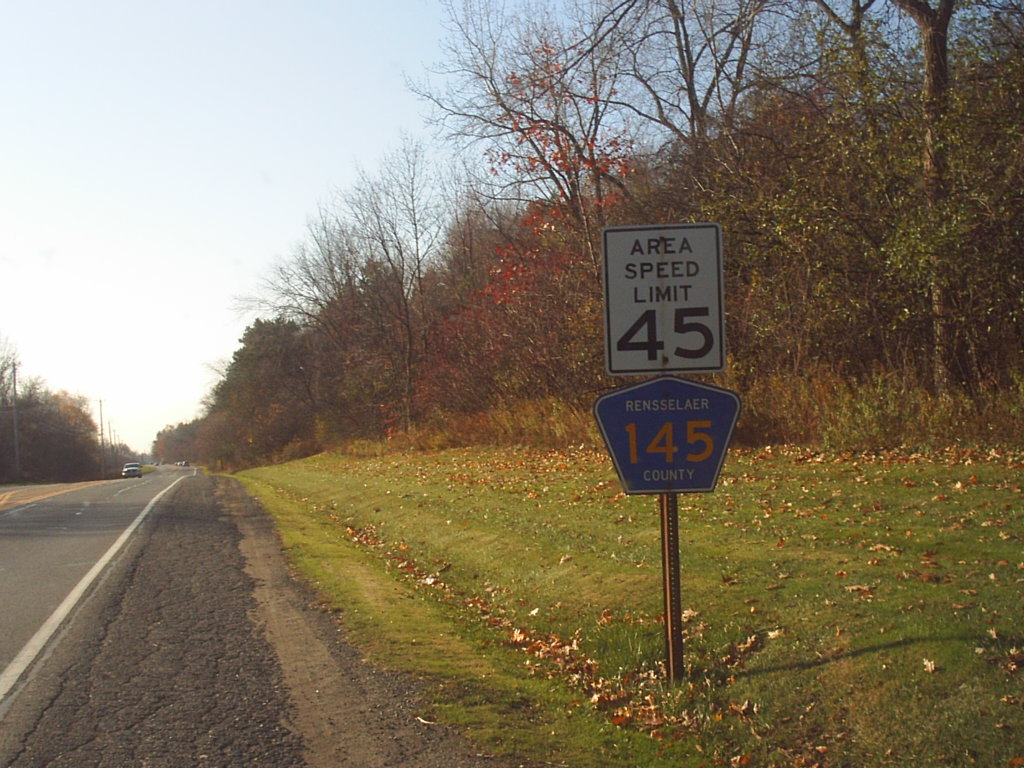
Signage along NY 40 through Brunswick denoting CR 145

Soon crossing into Lansingburgh, NY 40 runs northeast through the eastern end of the cemetery, passing the nearby St. Peter's Cemetery as well. Just after crossing the northern limits of Oakwood Cemetery, the route crosses into the town of Brunswick, where it becomes maintained by Rensselaer County and gains the County Route 145 (CR 145) designation. Continuing north through Brunswick, NY 40 continues through Lansingburgh, which is where the route meets a junction with NY 142. NY 40 and NY 142 become concurrent for one block in front of the Lansingburgh Reservoir, before NY 40 turns northward once again. Now on Leversee Road, the route remains a two-lane residential street, reaching a junction with the terminus of CR 116 (Brickyard Road).

NY 40 crosses into the town of Schaghticoke, where it gains the Speigletown Road moniker. Through the town of Schaghticoke, the route remains the two-lane residential road it was through Lansingburgh, reaching a junction with CR 126 (Fogarty Road). At the junction with CR 126, NY 40 turns northward, drops the moniker of Speigletown Road and changes into a much more rural roadway. Passing some residences as it winds northward, the route meets the junction with CR 122 as it enters the populated hamlet of Grant Hollow. Bypassing the center of Grant Hollow, NY 40 soon reaches the hamlet of Melrose, where it meets with the junction with CR 117 (Melrose–Valley Falls Road).

Continuing north through the town of Schaghticoke, NY 40 returns to its rural settings north of Melrose, turning northeast at the junction with Northline Drive. Along this northeastern stretch, the route passes through the rural hamlet of Schaghticoke Hill and soon crosses the Tomhonnock Creek into the village of Schaghticoke. At the southern end of the village, NY 40 reaches a junction with NY 67 (Old Schaghticoke Road). NY 40 and NY 67 become concurrent and run along the Hoosic River into the village. Known as Main Street through the village, NY 40 and NY 67 become a two-lane commercial street through the village. Just north of downtown, the routes reach a junction with CR 125, where NY 67 turns eastward while NY 40 proceeds north.

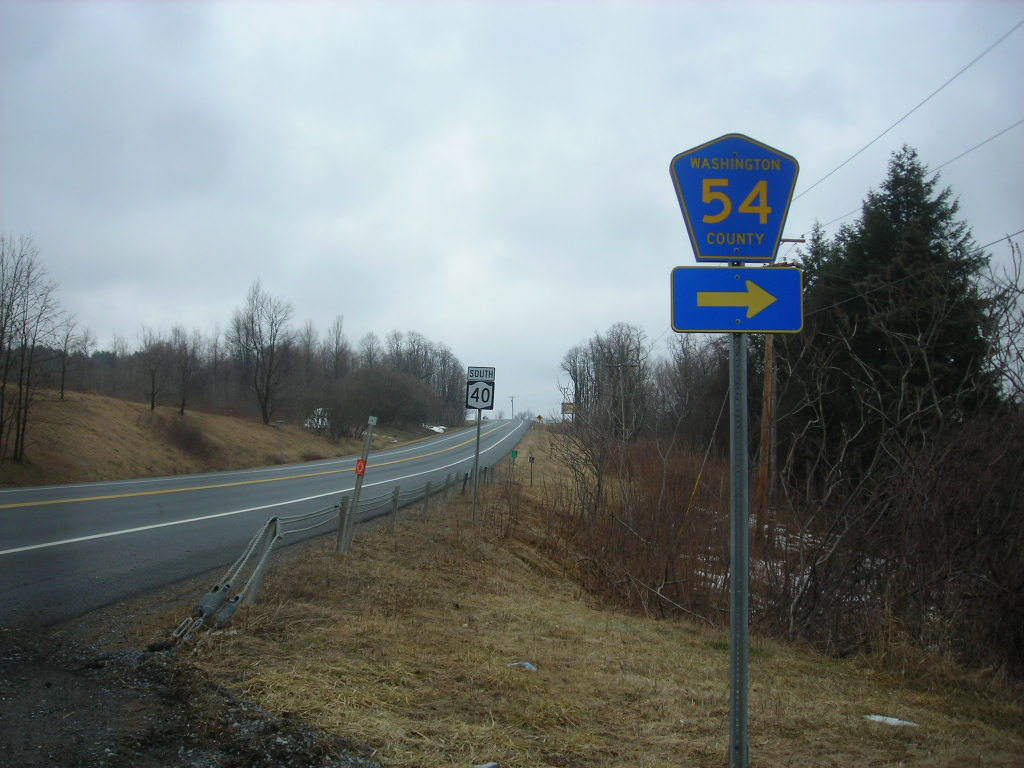
NY 40 southbound at the junction with CR 54 in Crandall Corners

NY 40 continues north through the town of Schaghticoke, returning the rural settings through the town. After the junction with Casey Road, the route makes a northerly dash to the county line, where it crosses just north of Molesky Lane. Now in Washington County, NY 40 continues north through the town of Easton. Just after the line, the route enters the hamlet of Crandall Corners, where it junctions with the eastern terminus of CR 54. Turning northeast, the route enters the hamlet of South Easton and soon after, Barkers Grove. Through Barkers Grove, the route passes several local residences and winds north into the hamlet of Easton. NY 40 through Easton is the main thoroughfare, passing multiple residences and a junction with Wells Road and Vly Summit Road.

=== Easton to Granville ===
North of the namesake hamlet, NY 40 continues northeast through the town of Easton, soon turning north through rural sections of Washington County. At the junction with Hegeman Bridge Road, the route turns northwest and reaches a junction with NY 29. NY 29 and NY 40 become concurrent, turning north past the Battenkill Country Club and soon over the Batten Kill. Now in the town of Greenwich and the hamlet of Middle Falls, NY 40 turns northeast and reaches a roundabout, where NY 29 continues east and NY 40 turns north through Greenwich. Continuing north through Greenwich, NY 40 turns northeast at a junction with CR 77 (Bald Mountain Road).

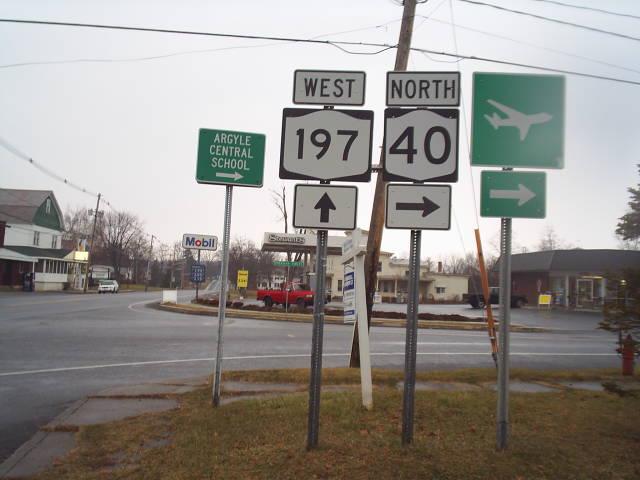
NY 40 northbound at NY 197 in the village of Argyle

Passing west of the village of Spraguetown, NY 40 winds north through the town of Greenwich for several miles, reaching the hamlet of Lick Springs, a small rural community several miles north of Middle Falls. Here, the route crosses into the town of Argyle, the route proceeds northeast through the town, reaching the junction with the northern terminus of CR 49 (Old State 338). Just north of this junction, the route crosses through the hamlet of South Argyle, a rural community. North of South Argyle, NY 40 continues through the farmlands, soon reaching the namesake village. Now boasting the name of Main Street, NY 40 crosses north through downtown Argyle, reaching a junction at the northern end of the hamlet with the eastern terminus of NY 197.

At this intersection, Main Street continues north onto NY 197 while NY 40 turns eastward and soon out of the village. Bending northeast, NY 40 continues through the town of Argyle, passing the Argyle Airport on the northbound side. Crossing into the hamlet of North Argyle, the route reaches the eastern end of CR 44. North Argyle represents several residences along both sides of the highway, ending at a junction with CR 45. NY 40 continues north through the town of Argyle, remaining the two-lane rural roadway it has been through most of the municipality. The route soon crosses into the town of Hartford and becomes a mix of rural and residential roadway, reaching the hamlet of East Hartford.

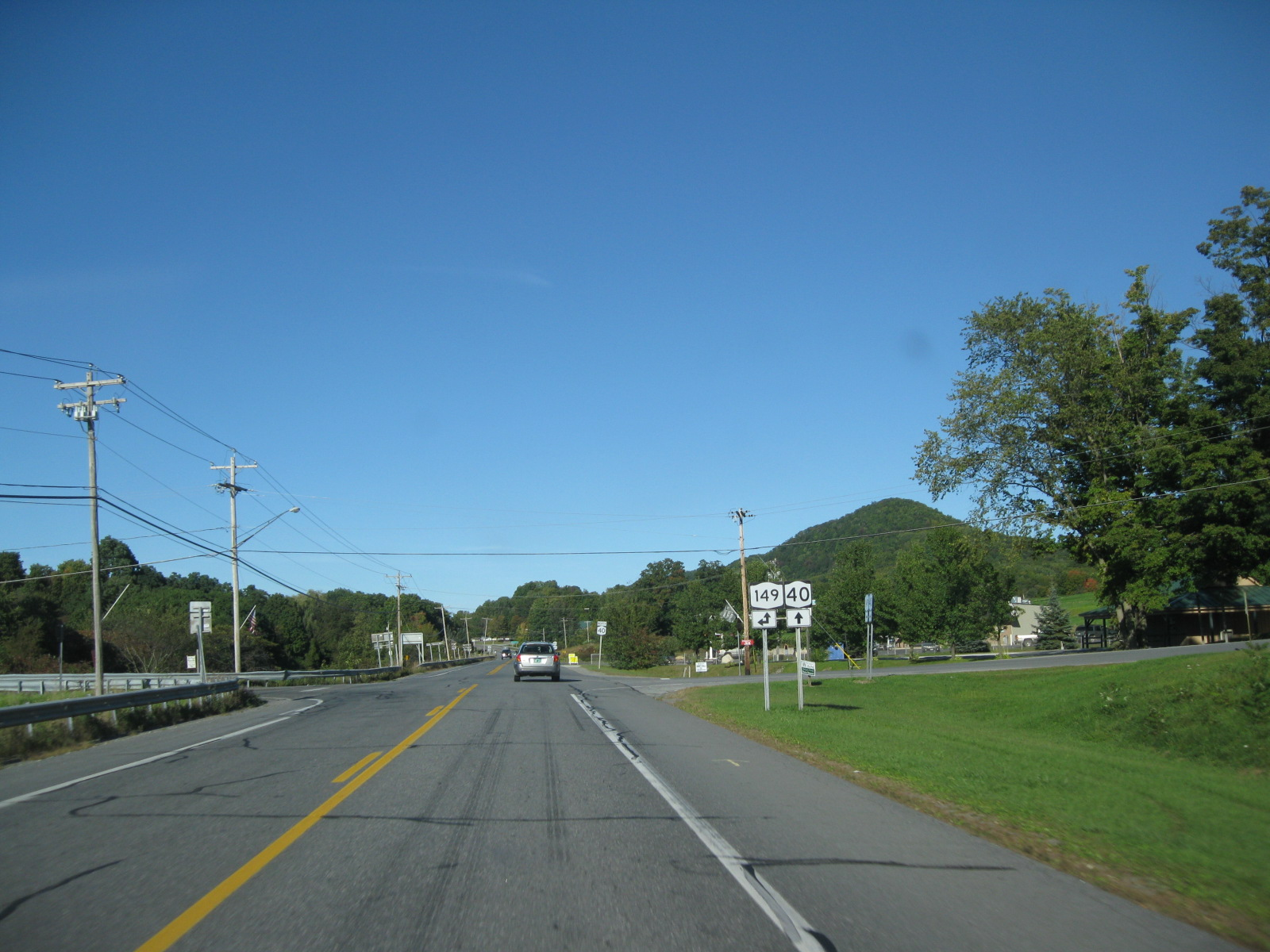
NY 40 at the junction with NY 149 in the town of Hartford

In East Hartford, NY 40 enters a junction with the eastern terminus of NY 196. NY 40 through the hamlet is a two-lane residential street, soon reaching a junction with CR 30. Just to the north, NY 40 runs northeast and enters a junction with NY 149. NY 40 and NY 149 become concurrent through the town of Hartford, passing east of the namesake hamlet. Just a short distance after, NY 149 turns east and NY 40 continues northeast past Morningside Cemetery. At the north end of the hamlet of Hatford, NY 40 reaches a junction with CR 23. North of the hamlet, the route returns to its rural surroundings, reaching a junction with another piece of CR 23.

For a short distance north of CR 23, NY 40 crosses through the town of Fort Ann, based near a junction with Whitney Road. The route then crosses into the town of Granville, where it enters the rural hamlet of West Granville, and a junction with CR 17 at the center. A block north of CR 17, NY 40 reaches a junction with NY 22. This junction marks the northern terminus of NY 40, whose right-of-way continues north as Sheehan Road Extension.

== History ==
=== Establishment and realignments ===
NY 40 was assigned as part of the 1930 renumbering of state highways in New York to an alignment extending from East Greenbush in the south to Comstock in the north via the city of Troy and the hamlet of Middle Granville. It began at U.S. Route 9 and U.S. Route 20 and ran concurrent with U.S. Route 4 to Troy, where it split from US 4 at 125th Street. From there, it followed 125th Street, Northern Drive, and Brickyard Road out of the city. NY 40 joined its modern alignment shortly afterward at Leversee Road.

The current and original routings of NY 40 remained identical until the town of Hartford. The route left its current alignment north of the hamlet of Hartford and headed northeast to Middle Granville, where it met NY 22. NY 40 and NY 22 came together, forming an overlap westward to Truthville. NY 22 split from NY 40 here, veering off to the northwest, while NY 40 continued west to US 4 in Comstock, where it ended. The Middle Granville–Comstock segment of NY 40 was part of NY 24 prior to the renumbering; in fact, it was the only part of NY 40 that was part of a route prior to 1930.

NY 40 was realigned slightly by the following year to bypass Middle Granville entirely. Instead of heading northeast from Hartford, NY 40 went northward to West Granville, where it rejoined its previous alignment. By 1932, NY 40 was rerouted in the vicinity of Troy. It now left US 4 in the town of North Greenbush (south of Troy) and followed Winter Street northeastward into the city. Within Troy, NY 40 overlapped NY 66 to its end at Congress Avenue (then-NY 96 and now NY 2) and briefly joined NY 96 westward to 15th Street. NY 40 turned north here, following 15th Street to Oakwood Avenue, where the route joined its modern routing.

=== Truncations and other developments ===
Following the 1930s, NY 40 began to be reduced in size. In the early 1940s, NY 22 was realigned between Truthville and Whitehall to serve Comstock by way of NY 40 and US 4. As a result, NY 40 was truncated south to its junction with NY 149 in Hartford. The portion of NY 40's routing between Hartford and West Granville was a sub-par road at the time (deemed as a second and third-class highway by map cartographer General Drafting), which led the state to place the end of the route in Hartford instead. In the late 1950s, NY 40 was cut back on its southern end to begin at what had been the northern terminus of its overlap with US 4 in North Greenbush.

NY 40 was re-extended on its northern end c. 1962 to follow its former routing northeastward to Middle Granville, where it ended at NY 22. The alignment proved to be temporary as the Hartford–West Granville highway was improved during the mid-1960s and became part of a realigned NY 40 by 1968. The last change to NY 40's routing came in 1973 when it was truncated on its southern end to the junction of Hoosick Street (NY 7) and 10th Street in Troy. As a result, NY 40 was also realigned slightly to use 10th Street and Oakwood Avenue between Hoosick and 15th Streets. NY 40's former routing on Winter Street was redesignated as NY 405.

On April 1, 1980, ownership and maintenance of the portion of NY 40 that lies south of NY 142 and outside of the Troy city limits was transferred from the state of New York to Rensselaer County as part of a large highway maintenance swap between the two levels of government. The routing of NY 40 was not altered; however, the part of the route given to the county is now co-designated as CR 145 and is also co-signed as such.

== NY 40A ==
New York State Route 40A
- Location: Schaghticoke town–Schaghticoke village
- Existed: c. 1933–late 1940s

NY 40A was an alternate route of NY 40 in the town of Schaghticoke. It connected NY 40 to the Tomhannock Reservoir and the village of Valley Falls and had an overlap with NY 67 between Valley Falls and the village of Schaghticoke. The southern terminus of the route was at an intersection with NY 40 in the hamlet of Melrose. NY 40A's northern terminus was at the junction of NY 40 and NY 67 just north of the Schaghticoke village limits. The route was assigned c. 1933 and removed in the late 1940s. However, the portion of NY 40A's old alignment between the southern Valley Falls village line and NY 67 remained state-maintained until April 1, 1980, when ownership and maintenance of it was transferred to Rensselaer County as part of a large highway maintenance swap between the state and the county. The entirety of NY 40A's former routing south of NY 67 is now CR 117.

== Major intersections ==
County	Location	mi	km	Destinations	Notes
Rensselaer	Troy	0.00	0.00	NY 7 (Hoosick Street)	Southern terminus, To I-787
Rensselaer	Troy	3.45	5.55	NY 142 north (Northern Drive)	Western terminus of concurrency of NY 142
Rensselaer	Troy	3.53	5.68	NY 142 south (Northern Drive)	Eastern terminus of concurrency with NY 142
Rensselaer	Town of Schaghticoke	11.53	18.56	NY 67 west – Mechanicville	Southern terminus of concurrency with NY 67
Rensselaer	Village of Schaghticoke	13.08	21.05	NY 67 east – Valley Falls	Northern terminus of concurrency with NY 67
Washington	Easton	26.64	42.87	NY 29 west – Schuylerville	Western terminus of concurrency with NY 29
Washington	Town of Greenwich	27.65	44.50	NY 29 east – Greenwich	Traffic circle; eastern terminus of concurrency with NY 29; hamlet of Middle Falls
Washington	Village of Argyle	37.27	59.98	NY 197 west – Fort Edward	Eastern terminus of NY 197
Washington	Hartford	46.22	74.38	NY 196 west – Hudson Falls	Eastern terminus of NY 196; hamlet of South Hartford
Washington	Hartford	47.49	76.43	NY 149 west – Fort Ann	Southern terminus of concurrency with NY 149
Washington	Hartford	47.84	76.99	NY 149 east – Granville	Northern terminus of concurrency with NY 149; hamlet of Hartford
Washington	Town of Granville	54.67	87.98	NY 22 – Comstock, Middle Granville	Northern terminus; hamlet of North Granville
1.000 mi = 1.609 km; 1.000 km = 0.621 mi: Concurrency terminus

== See also ==
- List of county routes in Rensselaer County, New York
