= List of county routes in Washington County, New York =

County routes in Washington County, New York, are signed with the Manual on Uniform Traffic Control Devices-standard yellow-on-blue pentagon route marker.

== Routes 1–40 ==
Route	Length (mi)	Length (km)	From	Via	To	Notes
CR 1	2.41	3.88	Dead end at Lake George	Glenburnie Road in Putnam	NY 22	
CR 2	5.80	9.33	NY 22	Lower Road in Putnam	Essex County line (becomes CR 41)	
CR 3	2.35	3.78	CR 2	Putnam Station Road in Putnam	Dead end at Lake Champlain	
CR 6	4.76	7.66	Dead end at Lake George	Huletts Landing Road in Dresden	NY 22	
CR 6A	1.03	1.66	Dead end at Lake George	Lands End Road in Dresden	CR 6	
CR 6B	1.33	2.14	CR 6	Bluff Head Road in Dresden	Dead end at Lake George	
CR 7	1.72	2.77	Pike Brook Road	South Bay Road in Dresden	NY 22	
CR 7A	0.47	0.76	NY 22 in Whitehall	Old South Bay Bridge	Dead end at Lake Champlain in Dresden	
CR 9	4.09	6.58	CR 10	North Williams Street and Fair Haven Turnpike in Whitehall	US 4 / CR 21	
CR 9A	0.92	1.48	US 4	Norton Road in Whitehall	CR 9	
CR 9B	0.54	0.87	US 4	Beckwith Road in Whitehall	CR 9	
CR 10	5.77	9.29	CR 9	Doig Street and Sciota Road in Whitehall	Vermont state line	
CR 11	3.85	6.20	CR 10 in Whitehall	Peck Woods Road	Vermont state line in Hampton	
CR 11A	0.74	1.19	US 4	Golf Course Road in Hampton	CR 11	
CR 12	8.83	14.21	NY 22 in Granville	Truthville–Whitehall and Whitehall–Grays Corner roads	Whitehall village line in Whitehall	
CR 12A	0.27	0.43	NY 22	Truthville Loop in Granville	CR 12	
CR 16	8.21	13.21	US 4	Charles Street and Kanes Falls Road in Fort Ann	Fish Hill Road	
CR 17	8.28	13.33	NY 149 in Hartford	Bull Hill Road	NY 22 in Granville	
CR 17A	0.79	1.27	CR 17	West Granville Spur in Fort Ann	NY 22	
CR 18	7.19	11.57	US 4 in Whitehall	Brick Church Road	NY 22A in Hampton	Formerly NY 273
CR 18A	0.20	0.32	NY 22A	Poultney Road in Hampton	Vermont state line	
CR 19	1.69	2.72	NY 196	Shine Hill Road in Hartford	NY 40	
CR 20	0.45	0.72	NY 22A	Lee Road in Hampton	Vermont state line	
CR 21	8.48	13.65	CR 18	Steeles Bridge Road in Whitehall	US 4 / CR 9	
CR 23	6.46	10.40	NY 149 in Hartford	Hartford Loop and Slyboro Road	NY 22A in Granville	Discontinuous at NY 40
CR 23A	0.19	0.31	CR 23	East Street and East Street Fork in Hartford	NY 40 / NY 149	
CR 24	2.14	3.44	NY 149	North Street and Middle Granville Road in Granville	NY 22A	
CR 25	2.02	3.25	CR 24	Pine Street and Pine Hill Road in Granville	Vermont state line (becomes VT 31)	
CR 26	0.65	1.05	NY 22 / NY 149	Cot Bed Road and Church Street in Granville	Potter Avenue	
CR 27	1.35	2.17	NY 149 / CR 28	Parker Hill Road in Granville	NY 22	
CR 28	3.58	5.76	CR 31 in Hebron	South Granville Road	NY 149 / CR 27 in Granville	
CR 29	0.69	1.11	NY 22	West Pawlet Road in Granville	Vermont state line	
CR 30	16.51	26.57	NY 22 / CR 153 in Salem	West Broadway and Salem–West Hebron, West Hebron–Belcher, Belcher–East Hartford, and East Hartford–South Hartford roads	NY 40 in Hartford	
CR 31	11.36	18.28	CR 30	West Hebron–North Hebron, North Hebron–West Pawlet, and West Pawlet roads in Hebron	Vermont state line	
CR 32	3.34	5.38	Warren County line (becomes CR 38)	Pilot Knob Road in Fort Ann	Pilot Knob	
CR 35	6.67	10.73	US 4	Vaughn Road in Kingsbury	Warren County line (becomes CR 39)	
CR 36	2.24	3.60	CR 35	Kingsbury Street and Church and Kingsbury roads in Kingsbury	US 4	
CR 37	2.58	4.15	US 4 in Fort Edward	Maple and Burgoyne avenues	NY 32 / NY 196 in Kingsbury	
CR 40	0.40	0.64	US 4	Schuyler Street in Fort Edward	CR 37	

== Routes 41 and up ==
Route	Length (mi)	Length (km)	From	Via	To	Notes
CR 41	6.09	9.80	US 4 in Hudson Falls	Notre Dame and Mud streets	NY 149 in Kingsbury	
CR 42	2.85	4.59	NY 197 in Fort Edward	Basin Road	NY 196 in Kingsbury	
CR 43	7.88	12.68	NY 197 in Argyle	Argyle–Adamsville and Adamsville–Smiths Basin Road	NY 149 in Kingsbury	
CR 44	2.14	3.44	NY 197	Powers Corners Road in Argyle	NY 40	
CR 45	4.11	6.61	NY 40 in Argyle	The Hook Road	CR 30 in Hebron	
CR 46	10.07	16.21	US 4	Durkeetown Road in Fort Edward	US 4	
CR 47	7.38	11.88	NY 40 in Argyle	Goose Island Road	CR 30 in Hebron	
CR 48	4.48	7.21	CR 49 in Greenwich	Lake Road	CR 47 in Argyle	
CR 49	6.93	11.15	NY 40 in Argyle	Cossayuna Road	NY 29 in Greenwich	Formerly NY 338
CR 52	4.53	7.29	Greenwich village line	North Greenwich Road in Greenwich	Edie and McClay roads	
CR 53	0.74	1.19	Dead end at railroad trestle	Stevens and Thomp roads in Greenwich	NY 29 / NY 40	
CR 54	2.76	4.44	CR 113	Crandalls Corners Road in Easton	NY 40	
CR 59	8.09	13.02	Rensselaer County line (becomes CR 103)	Buskirk, Cambridge Center, and Buckley roads in Cambridge	NY 372	
CR 59A	0.79	1.27	CR 74	South Cambridge Road in Cambridge	CR 59	
CR 60	5.34	8.59	CR 59	Marshalls Corners Road in Cambridge	NY 372	
CR 61	7.64	12.30	NY 29 in Greenwich	Battenville, Shushan–Buffums, Dugans Corner, O'Donnell Hill, and Lauderdale–Shushan roads and Main Street	NY 313 in Jackson	
CR 62	4.15	6.68	NY 372	Jackson Road in Jackson	CR 61	
CR 64	8.58	13.81	NY 22 / CR 78 in Jackson	Drive Johnson, Law Avenue, and Salem–Shushan Road	NY 22 in Salem	
CR 64A	0.20	0.32	CR 61	Shushan Road in Salem	CR 64	
CR 67	2.66	4.28	NY 22 / NY 372 in Cambridge	East Main Street and Ash Grove Road	Chestnut Hill Road in White Creek	
CR 68	6.32	10.17	NY 22	White Creek Road in White Creek	Vermont state line	
CR 69	1.87	3.01	White Creek Road	Perry Road in White Creek	CR 68	
CR 70	0.38	0.61	Dead end at Hudson River	Dix Bridge Approach in Greenwich	CR 113	
CR 70A	0.18	0.29	CR 70	Dix Bridge Approach in Greenwich	CR 113	
CR 71	0.55	0.89	Turnpike Road	Herrington Road in White Creek	NY 22	
CR 74	10.96	17.64	Rensselaer County line in Cambridge (becomes CR 104)	Railroad and Eddy streets	NY 372 in Greenwich	
CR 74A	2.85	4.59	CR 74	Archdale in Easton	NY 372	
CR 75	1.02	1.64	Warren County line (becomes CR 79)	Feeder Street and Boulevard in Hudson Falls	US 4	Former routing of NY 32
CR 77	4.50	7.24	US 4	Bald Mountain Road in Greenwich	NY 40	
CR 78	0.36	0.58	NY 22	Old Route 22 in Jackson	NY 22 / CR 64	
CR 113	14.57	23.45	Rensselaer County line in Easton (becomes CR 120)	River Road	US 4 in Greenwich	Part north of NY 29 was designated NY 419 from c. 1933 to c. 1935
CR 153	5.47	8.80	NY 22 / CR 30	East Broadway and Salem–Rupert Road in Salem	Vermont state line (becomes VT 153)	Designated NY 153 from 1960 to early 1980s

== See also ==
- County routes in New York
- List of former state routes in New York
