= Greenbush, New York =

Greenbush, New York may refer to a few places in the U.S. state of New York:

In Rensselaer County:

- Greenbush, Rensselaer County, New York, a former town which was divided in 1855 into
  - East Greenbush, New York, a town
    - East Greenbush (CDP), New York, a hamlet within the town
  - North Greenbush, New York, a town
  - The Village of Greenbush, which in 1897 became the City of Rensselaer

In Rockland County:

- Greenbush was one of the former names for the hamlet of Blauvelt, in Rockland County, New York

In Schoharie County:

- Greenbush, Schoharie County, New York, a small settlement in the town of Cobleskill
