= New York State Route 197 =

State highway in eastern New York, US

New York State Route 197

Route information
- Maintained by NYSDOT
- Length: 10.78 mi (17.35 km)
- Existed: 1930–present

Major junctions
- West end: US 9 in Moreau
- US 4 in Fort Edward
- East end: NY 40 in Argyle

Location
- Country: United States
- State: New York
- Counties: Saratoga, Washington

Highway system
- New York Highways; Interstate; US; State; Reference; Parkways
← NY 196	→ NY 198

New York State Route 197 (NY 197) is an east–west state highway in eastern New York in the United States. It runs from U.S. Route 9 (US 9) in the Saratoga County town of Moreau east to NY 40 in Argyle. NY 197 has a short overlap with US 4 through the village of Fort Edward.

== Route description ==
NY 197 begins at an intersection with US 9 (Saratoga Road) in the town of Moreau northeast of interchange 17 on the Adirondack Northway (I-87). NY 197 heads eastward as Reynolds Road as a primarily residential two-lane boulevard through Moreau. Entering the hamlet of Reynolds Corners, NY 197 intersects with NY 32 (Gansevoort Road), where the route becomes a slight more rural east of the intersection. The route passes to the south of the Tee-Bird Country Club in Moreau, bending to the northeast through Moreau, paralleling Amtrak's Ethan Allen Express route, intersecting with CR 28 (Fort Edward Road) and CR 29 (West River Road). After the junction with CR 28, NY 197 crosses the Hudson River and enters Washington County. Entering the village of Fort Edward, NY 197 crosses Rogers Island Park and becomes known as Bridge Street.

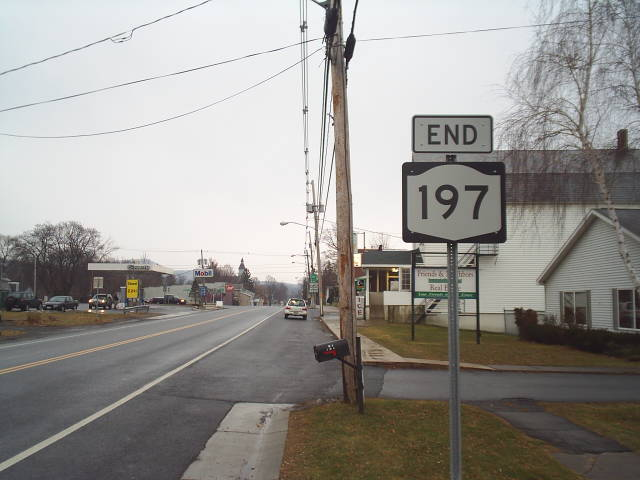
NY 197 approaching the terminus at NY 40 in Argyle village

Through Fort Edward, NY 197 intersects with US 4 (Broadway), in which form a concurrency to the east. Crossing under the Amtrak line, the two roads head southbound out of the downtown parts of the village before NY 197 forks to the northeast along the Champlain Canal as Argyle Street. NY 197 crosses eastward over the canal and into the town of Fort Edward. After the crossing, NY 197 becomes a rural two-lane roadway, passing eastward through farms. At the junction with CR 42 before darting to the southeast into the town of Argyle. NY 197 begins a winding pattern to the southeast, before turning gradually at a junction with CR 44 into the village of Argyle. In the village, the southern terminus of CR 43 intersects before NY 197 turns southbound into the downtown portion. Passing several residences, NY 197 gains the moniker of Main Street before terminating at an intersection with NY 40 (Sheridan Street). Main Street continues southbound as NY 40 through the village.

== History ==
NY 197 was assigned as part of the 1930 renumbering of state highways in New York. It initially began at NY 32 in Moreau and ended at NY 40 in Argyle. NY 197 was extended westward to US 9 in the early 1960s. On April 1, 1983, ownership and maintenance of NY 197 from US 4 to the eastern Fort Edward village line was transferred from the village of Fort Edward to the state of New York as part of a highway maintenance swap between the state of New York and Washington County.

== Major intersections ==
County	Location	mi	km	Destinations	Notes
Saratoga	Moreau	0.00	0.00	US 9 (Saratoga Road) to I-87 – Saratoga, Glens Falls	Western terminus
Saratoga	Moreau	1.47	2.37	NY 32 (Gansevoort Road) – Glens Falls, Gansevoort	Hamlet of Reynolds Corners
Washington	Village of Fort Edward	4.79	7.71	US 4 north (Broadway) – Hudson Falls	Northern terminus of US 4 / NY 197 overlap
Washington	Village of Fort Edward	5.27	8.48	US 4 south (Broadway)	Southern terminus of US 4 / NY 197 overlap
Washington	Village of Argyle	10.78	17.35	NY 40 (Sheridan Street)	Eastern terminus
1.000 mi = 1.609 km; 1.000 km = 0.621 mi: Concurrency terminus
