= East Greenbush =

East Greenbush is the name the following places in the United States of America:

- East Greenbush (CDP), New York
- East Greenbush (town), New York
