= New York State Route 196 =

State highway in Washington County, New York, US

New York State Route 196
- Map of Washington County in eastern New York with NY 196 highlighted in red

Route information
- Maintained by NYSDOT
- Length: 10.27 mi (16.53 km)
- Existed: 1930–present

Major junctions
- West end: US 4 in Hudson Falls
- East end: NY 40 in Hartford

Location
- Country: United States
- State: New York
- Counties: Washington

Highway system
- New York Highways; Interstate; US; State; Reference; Parkways
← NY 195	→ NY 197

New York State Route 196 (NY 196) is an east–west state highway located within Washington County, New York, in the United States. It extends for 10.27 miles (16.53 km) from an intersection with U.S. Route 4 (US 4) in the village of Hudson Falls to a junction with NY 40 in the Hartford hamlet of South Hartford. Just east of Hudson Falls, NY 196 intersects the northern terminus of NY 32 (Burgoyne Avenue), which actually intersects NY 196 on its north side.

The alignment of NY 196 dates back to the mid-19th century, as a new road was built in 1850 to connect between Hudson Falls (then known as Sandy Hill) and the hamlet of Adamsville. The Sandy Hill and Adamsville Plank Road was 6 miles (9.7 km) long and replaced a direct road that connected Sandy Hill to South Hartford. The state rebuilt the alignment in 1908 and NY 196 was assigned to its current alignment as part of the 1930 renumbering of state highways in New York.

== Route description ==
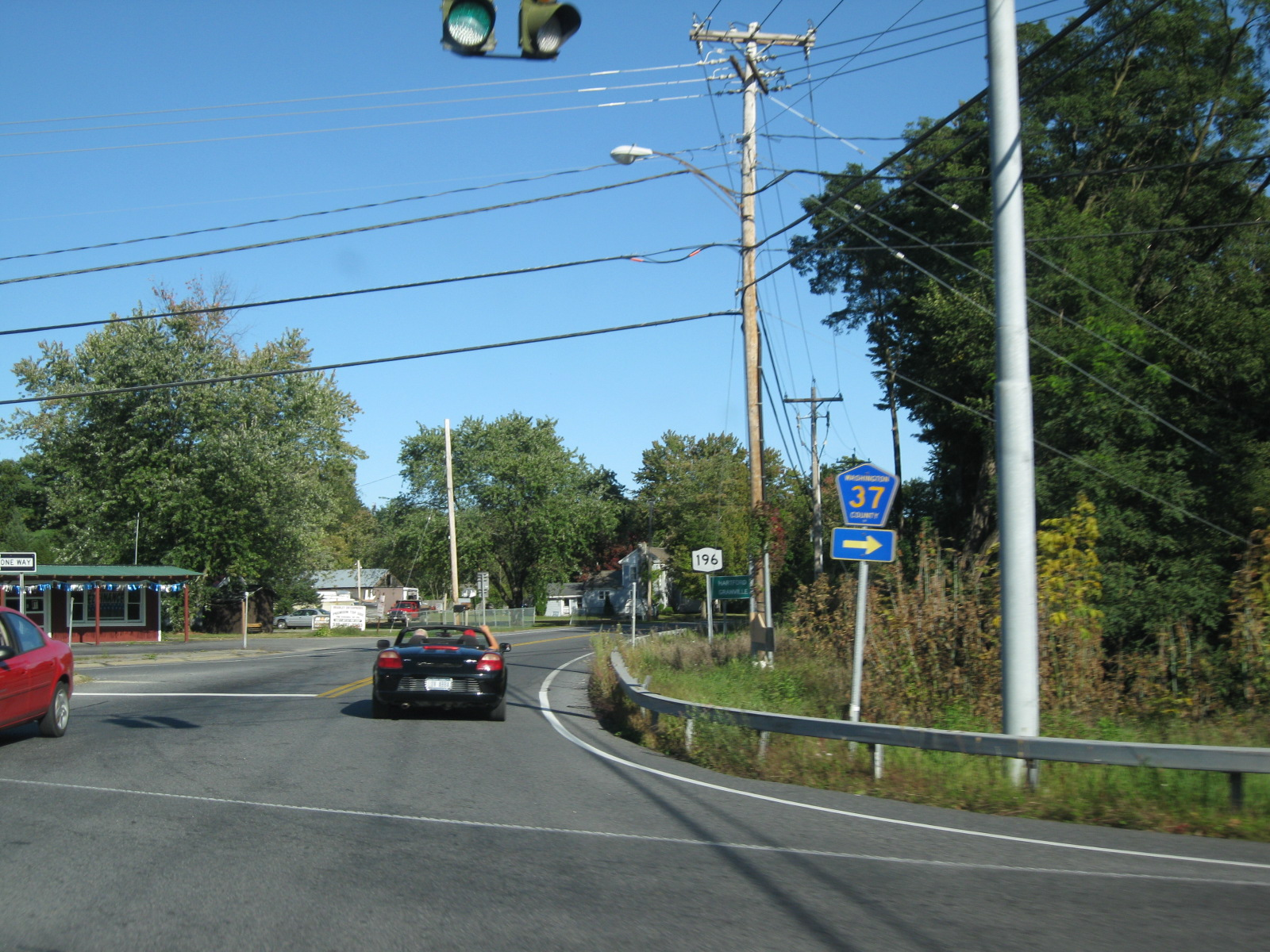
NY 196 at the junction with NY 32 and CR 37 in Kingsbury

NY 196 begins at an intersection with US 4 (Main Street) in the village of Hudson Falls, just south of the eastern terminus of NY 254. The route proceeds east along Maple Street, a two-lane commercial street until the intersection with Mulberry Street, where the route becomes a long residential stretch for several blocks through Hudson Falls. Just east of the intersection of Linden Drive, NY 196 crosses the Glens Falls Feeder Canal and walking trail, continuing east past Hudson Falls Intermediate School. Leaving the village of Hudson Falls, NY 196 crosses into the town of Kingsbury, where it drops the Maple Street moniker and immediately intersects with the northern terminus of NY 32 (Burgoyne Avenue). Although the junction is NY 32's north end, the route intersects NY 196 from the north as the highway curves southward for its final segment after traveling east from nearby Glens Falls. NY 32 continues south of NY 196 as County Route 37 (CR 37, named Burgoyne Avenue).

Past NY 32, NY 196 bends southeast through Kingsbury as a two-lane residential road. Crossing over a tributary of the Glens Falls Feeder Canal, the route crosses a single-track railroad line before crossing over the Champlain Canal on a large truss bridge. After the Champlain Canal, NY 196 bends northeast through Kingsbury, crossing an intersection with the northern terminus of CR 42, soon leaving the residential section for a more rural area of town. Passing numerous farms, NY 196 soon bends eastward, crossing an intersection with CR 43. NY 196 bends northeast on a sharp curve, leaving Kingsbury for the town of Hartford. The route winds past numerous homes, turning north past a couple farms before following a gradual bend east near Slate Way.

Turning northeast, NY 196 continues through Hartford, crossing past numerous homes as a two-lane rural roadway. Just after passing the Pole Valley Players Club (a golf course), NY 196 turns southeast, crossing over a small creek, passing more farms on both sides of the roadway. Passing a couple farms, NY 196 crosses into the hamlet of South Hartford, where the route ends at an intersection with NY 40.

== History ==
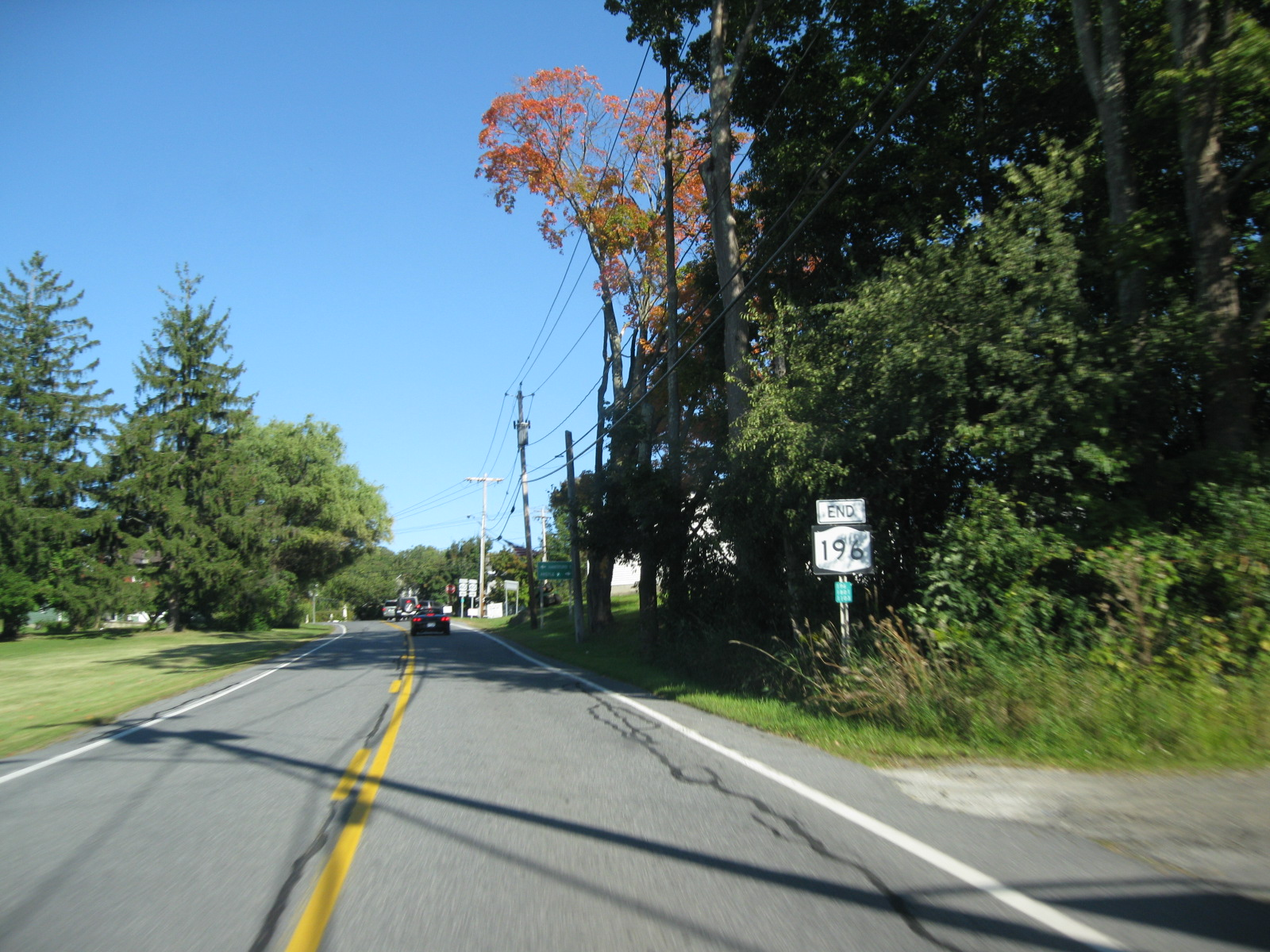
NY 196 eastbound approaching the junction with NY 40 in South Hartford

The alignment of NY 196 from the village of Hudson Falls to the hamlet of Adamsville was first constructed in 1850 as a plank road between the two communities. Before construction of the Sandy Hill and Adamsville Plank Road, the only direct route between Sandy Hill (present-day Hudson Falls) and the hamlet of South Hartford was a road deemed treacherous to traverse.

The plank road was acquired by the state of New York in the early 20th century following the completion of four projects to improve different parts of the road. In Kingsbury, the highway was rebuilt as part of two contracts, the earliest of which was awarded on February 5, 1908 to Linehan and Burman, a local contracting firm. The portion reconstructed under this project was added to the state highway system on November 18 of that year as State Highway 720 (SH 720). A 0.24-mile (0.39 km) segment excluded from the original contract was improved under a second contract let on June 15, 1911, and accepted into the state highway system on September 4, 1912, as SH 720A.

On August 4, 1913, the state let a contract to improve 0.94 miles (1.51 km) of roads in Hudson Falls, including part of modern NY 196. The rebuilt highways were added as state highways on January 19, 1914, as SH 1080. The section of what is now NY 196 in Hartford was improved under a project contracted out on June 28, 1922, and completed by 1926 as SH 8101. The Hudson Falls–Hartford state highway—comprising SH 720, SH 720A, and parts of SH 1080 and SH 8101—was not assigned a posted route number until the 1930 renumbering of state highways in New York, when hundreds of state-maintained roads were given a posted designation for the first time. The Hudson Falls–Hartford highway was designated as NY 196, and the alignment of the route has not changed since that time.

== Major intersections ==
The entire route is in Washington County.

Location	mi	km	Destinations	Notes
Hudson Falls	0.00	0.00	US 4 (Main Street) to NY 254	Western terminus
Kingsbury	1.23	1.98	NY 32 south / CR 37 (Burgoyne Avenue)	Northern terminus of NY 32
Hartford	10.27	16.53	NY 40 – Hartford, Argyle	Eastern terminus; hamlet of South Hartford
1.000 mi = 1.609 km; 1.000 km = 0.621 mi
