= Schaghticoke =

Schaghticoke may refer to:

- Schaghticoke (town), New York
- Schaghticoke (village), New York
- Schaghticoke people
