= U.S. Route 4 in New York =

Highway in New York

U.S. Route 4
- US 4 highlighted in red

Route information
- Maintained by NYSDOT and the cities of Troy and Mechanicville
- Length: 79.67 mi (128.22 km)
- Existed: 1926–present
- Tourist routes: Lakes to Locks Passage

Major junctions
- South end: US 9 / US 20 in East Greenbush
- I-90 in East Greenbush; NY 7 in Troy; NY 67 in Mechanicville; NY 29 in Schuylerville; NY 149 in Fort Ann
- East end: US 4 at the Vermont state line in Hampton

Location
- Country: United States
- State: New York
- Counties: Rensselaer, Saratoga, Washington

Highway system
- United States Numbered Highway System; List; Special; Divided; New York Highways; Interstate; US; State; Reference; Parkways
| ← NY 3A | → NY 5 |
| ← NY 6A | NY 6B | → NY 6N |

U.S. Route 4 (US 4) is a part of the United States Numbered Highway System that runs from East Greenbush, New York, to Portsmouth, New Hampshire. In the U.S. state of New York, US 4 extends 79.67 miles (128.22 km) from an intersection with US 9 and US 20 in East Greenbush to the Vermont state line northeast of Whitehall. While the remainder of US 4 east of New York is an east–west route, US 4 in New York is signed north–south due to the alignment the route takes through the state. The portion of the route between Waterford and Whitehall is part of the Lakes to Locks Passage, an All-American Road.

The route runs along the Hudson River from Troy to Hudson Falls and the Champlain Canal from Fort Ann to Whitehall. It passes through several riverside and canalside communities, including two cities (Troy and Mechanicville) and seven villages. US 4 crosses several major east–west highways as it proceeds north, such as Interstate 90 (I-90) in East Greenbush, New York State Route 7 (NY 7) in Troy, NY 29 in Schuylerville, and NY 149 in Fort Ann. It also overlaps with the north–south NY 22 for six miles (9.7 km) from Comstock to Whitehall and with NY 32 for a total of 16 miles (26 km) between Waterford and Bemis Heights and from Schuylerville to Northumberland.

US 4 was assigned in 1926 and initially extended from Glens Falls to the Vermont border near Whitehall by way of Hudson Falls. The route utilized part of NY 6 and NY 30, two highways assigned in 1924. US 4 was extended southward to its present terminus in East Greenbush as part of the 1930 renumbering of state highways in New York. Much of US 4 south of Hudson Falls initially overlapped with other routes; most of the overlaps were gradually eliminated during the 1940s and 1950s as the concurrent routes were eliminated or truncated. At one time, US 4 overlapped with NY 32 from Waterford to Northumberland with no interruption in between. The concurrency was split into two shorter overlaps when US 4 was realigned in the 1950s to follow its current alignment between Bemis Heights and Schuylerville.

== Route description ==
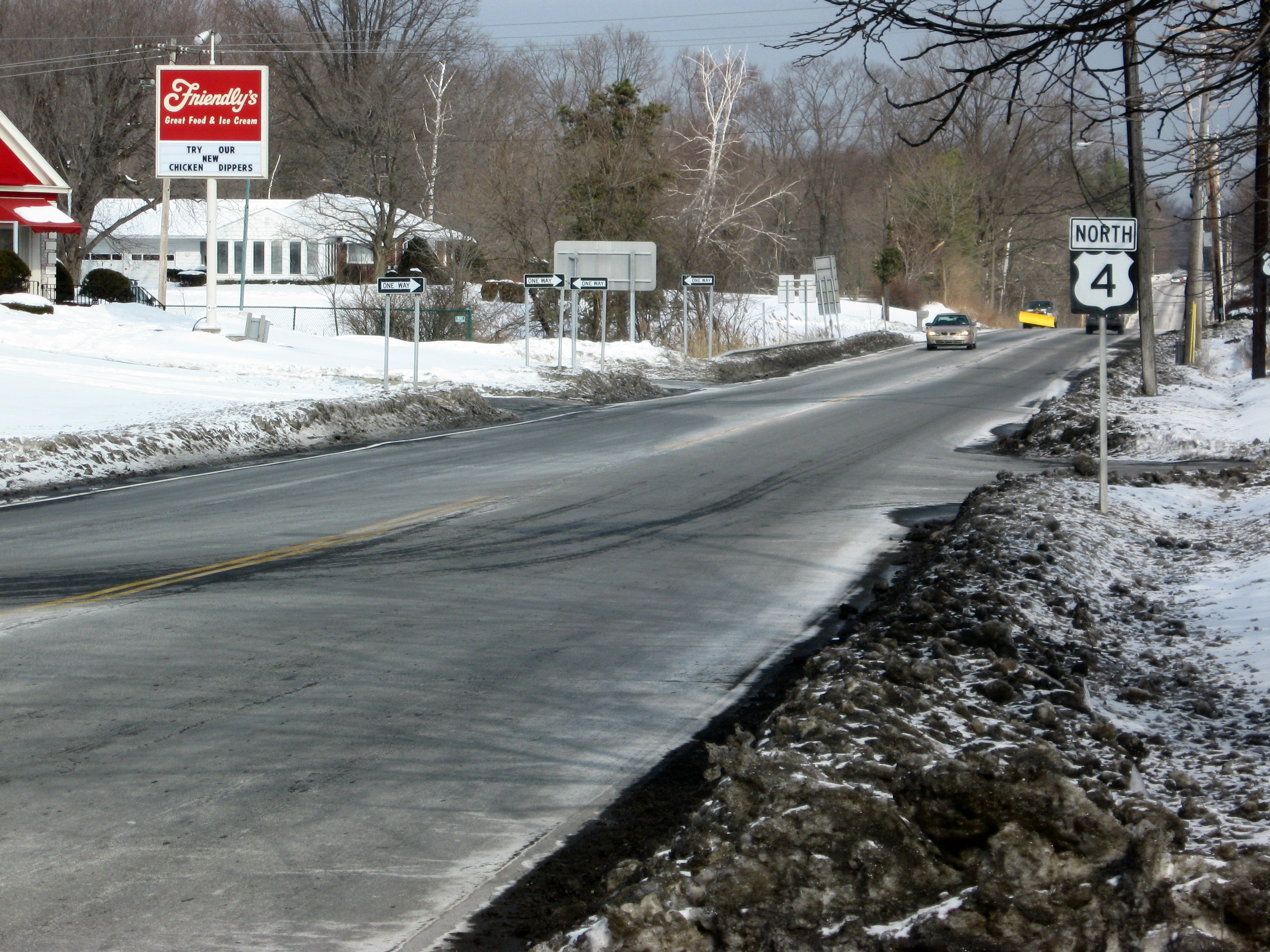
US 4 begins here at US 9 and US 20 in East Greenbush.

The portion of US 4 between NY 32 in Waterford and NY 22 in Whitehall is the southernmost part of the Lakes to Locks Passage, an All-American Road that begins in Waterford and heads north through eastern New York to Rouses Point. Additionally, the segment of US 4 between the northern city line of Mechanicville and the eastern village line of Whitehall is designated as the Turning Point Trail.

Most of the route is maintained by the New York State Department of Transportation (NYSDOT); however, two sections are maintained by local highway departments. The first lies within the city of Troy, where US 4 is completely city-maintained. The other is in the city of Mechanicville, where local maintenance extends from Frances Street (four blocks south of NY 67) to the northern city line.

=== East Greenbush to Schuylerville ===
US 4 begins at the concurrency of US 9 and US 20 in East Greenbush. Heading northward, it has an interchange with I-90, continuing northward into Troy. In Troy, it passes by Hudson Valley Community College as well as the headquarters of the 42nd Infantry Division. US 4 then heads downhill, passing the historic South End Tavern as Burden Avenue, named for the historic Burden Iron Works. Later, US 4 assumes Fourth Street, which splits into parallel one-way streets (Third Street handles southbound traffic from downtown). At Congress Street, in the middle of the Central Troy Historic District with St. Paul's Episcopal Church on the corner, it intersects NY 2. Once through downtown, the streets meet and pass by the Green Island Bridge, later passing under the Collar City Bridge and onto Second Avenue in Lansingburgh.

After Lansingburgh, US 4 turns left to cross the Hudson River on the Troy–Waterford Bridge, entering Waterford and joining with NY 32 to head north together west of the Hudson. They run along the riverbank for seven miles (11 km) to the city of Mechanicville, where the routes cross over the Anthony Kill and intersect NY 67 in the central business district. US 4 and NY 32 continue on, passing through the nearby village of Stillwater before splitting at Bemis Heights, a small community five miles (8.0 km) northeast of Mechanicville. While NY 32 follows a more inland routing along the western edge of Saratoga National Historical Park, US 4 continues to follow the riverbank, running along the eastern boundary of the park. Past the park, the route passes by Gerald B. H. Solomon Saratoga National Cemetery before rejoining NY 32 at the southern edge of the village of Schuylerville.

=== Schuylerville to Vermont line ===
US 4 begins to run along the Champlain Canal after Schuylerville, passing through the hamlets of Northumberland and Starks Knob. At a crossing over the Hudson River, US 4 and the concurrent NY 32 split in different directions. US 4, which is now on the other side of the Hudson River, continues northward through Fort Miller and crosses the river once more. The route then enters Fort Edward, where it becomes concurrent with NY 197.

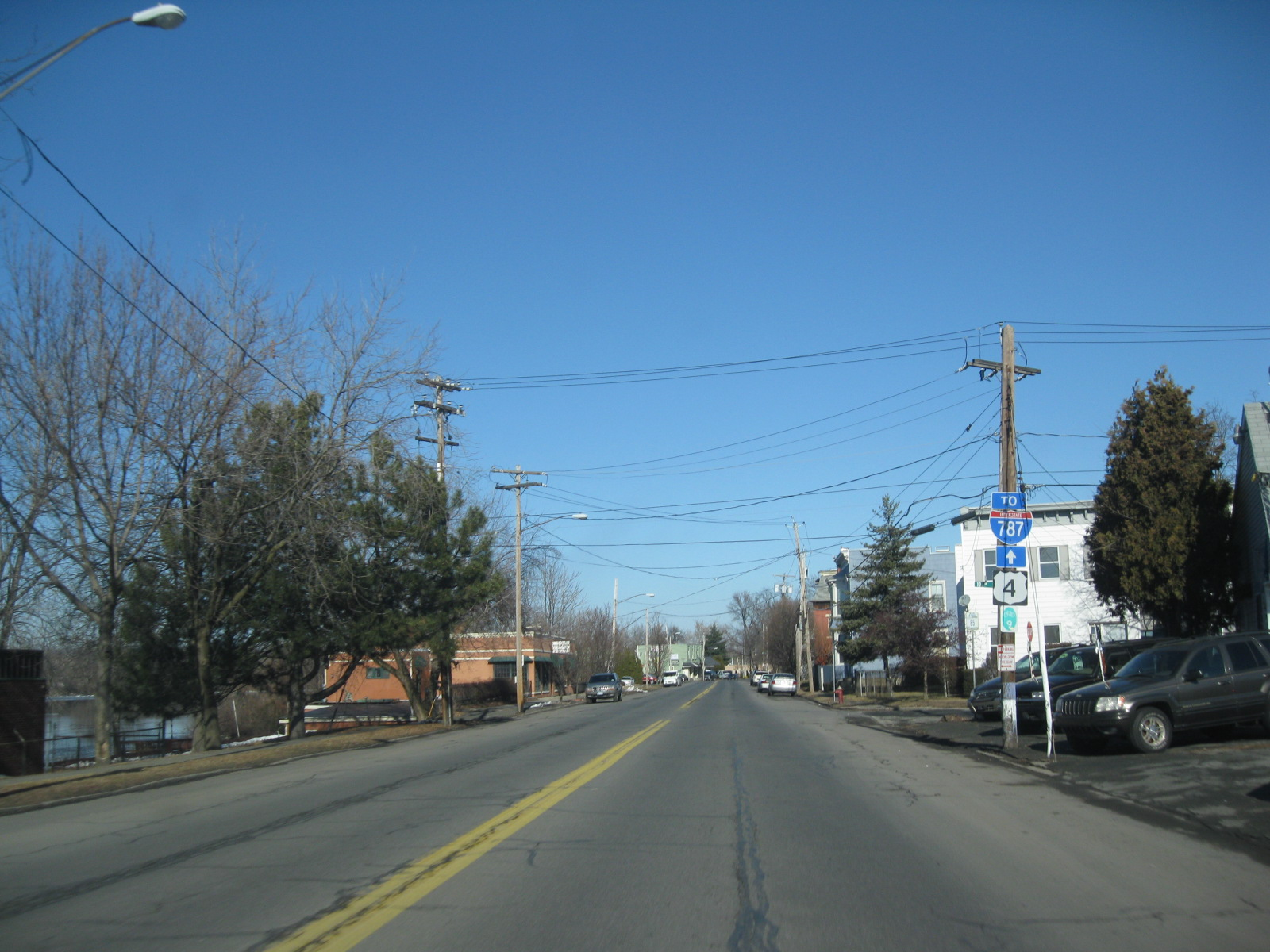
US 4 northbound at 106th Street in Troy. At left is the Hudson River, which US 4 follows from Troy to Hudson Falls.

With the Hudson River to its west, US 4 heads northward once again, leaving NY 197 behind. Not far after Fort Edward, the highway enters Hudson Falls, where it turns into a local road. There, it heads through downtown, intersecting with NY 196 and, soon afterward, NY 254. US 4 makes a sudden curve to the northeast, heading through the rural regions for the rest of its length.

There is one final intersection with NY 32, but they do not become concurrent and US 4 heads to the northeast. The route passes through Kingsbury and soon after, becomes concurrent with NY 149. The two routes head into Fort Ann, where they split, with NY 149 heading westward. After passing Battle Hill, NY 22 merges in from Comstock. There are several hills before the intersection where the two roads split in Whitehall. US 4 continues along its final stretch after NY 22, passing fields and such to the state line, where it continues into Vermont.

== History ==
=== Origins and assignment ===
In 1911, the New York State Legislature created Route 43, an unsigned legislative route extending from the southern village line of Stillwater to the western village line of Schuylerville via the hamlet of Quaker Springs. On March 1, 1921, Route 43 was renumbered to Route 44 to eliminate numerical duplication with another legislative Route 43 in Western New York. At the same time, Route 44 was extended southwest from Stillwater to Clifton Park via Mechanicville and west from Schuylerville to Saratoga Springs.

The first set of posted routes in New York were assigned in 1924. Two of the routes assigned at this time were NY 6, a north–south route extending from the New York City line to the Canada–United States border, and NY 30, another north–south route connecting NY 6 in Mechanicville to the Vermont state line west of Fair Haven. NY 6 left Albany on modern NY 32 and followed it to Mechanicville, where NY 6 veered westward on what is now NY 67 and NY 30 picked up the current alignment of NY 32. NY 30 continued north on modern NY 32 to Glens Falls, at which point it went east to Hudson Falls via Warren and River streets. It headed northward from there to Vermont on modern US 4. From Mechanicville to Schuylerville, NY 30 utilized the alignment of legislative Route 44. By 1926, NY 30 was rerouted north of Whitehall to continue north toward the Canadian border. The old alignment of NY 30 between Whitehall and Vermont was not assigned a new number. Meanwhile, an alternate route of NY 6 on the east side of the Hudson River between NY 5 (now US 20) in East Greenbush and NY 6 in Waterford was designated as NY 6B by 1926.

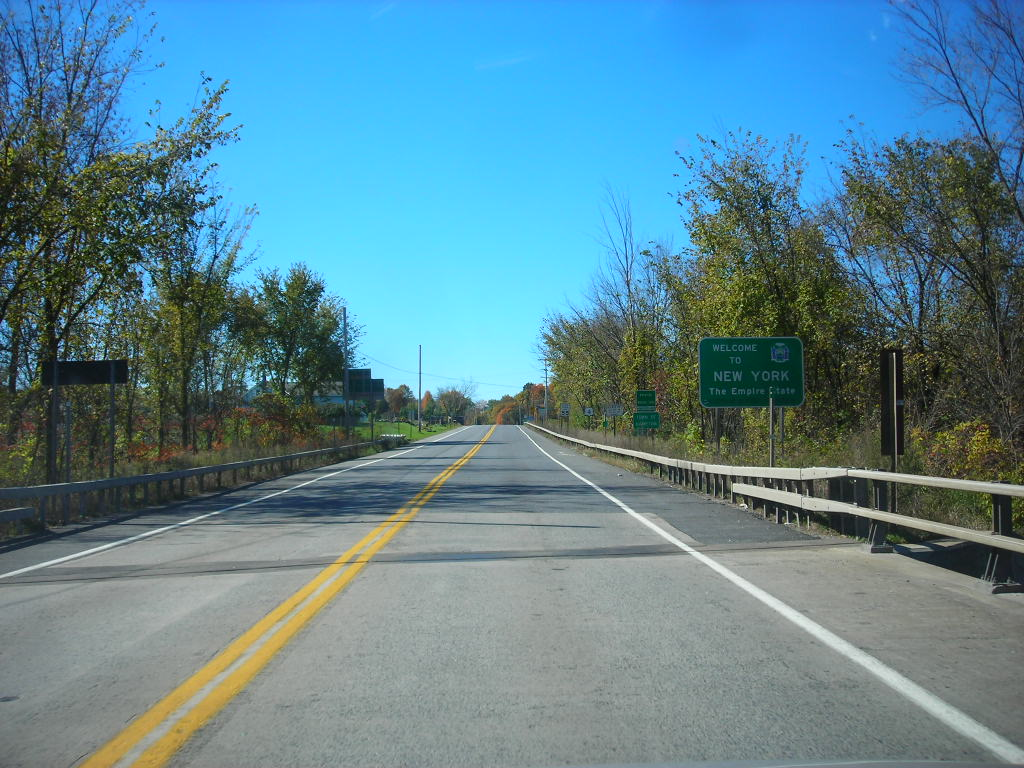
Entering New York on US 4 southbound

In the original plans for the U.S. Numbered Highway System, the north–south highway along the western bank of the Hudson River was designated as US 9 while the highway on the eastern bank was assigned US 109. The two routes were concurrent from Albany to Mechanicville, where US 9 went west to follow NY 6 while US 109 continued north on NY 30. The designations met again south of Glens Falls, where US 109 ended at US 9. Also in the original plans was US 4, which was assigned to all of NY 30's original alignment between Glens Falls and the Vermont state line. In the final system alignment approved on November 11, 1926, the routing of US 9 was altered to follow its modern alignment between Albany and Glens Falls while US 109 was reconfigured to use NY 6B between East Greenbush and Waterford.

=== Southward extension and overlaps ===
When U.S. Routes were first posted in New York in 1927, US 9 was restored to its originally planned alignment between Albany and Glens Falls (via Waterford and Mechanicville) while the US 109 designation went unassigned. The portion of US 109's alignment south of Waterford became US 9E instead. US 4 was assigned as planned in 1926, overlapping NY 30 between Glens Falls and Whitehall. The NY 6 designation was completely removed at this time. In the 1930 renumbering of state highways in New York, US 9 was realigned to follow its modern routing between Albany and Round Lake. The portion of US 9's former routing between Waterford and Mechanicville as well as all of US 9E north of US 20 became a southward extension of US 4, which left its original alignment in Hudson Falls and followed a previously unnumbered riverside highway south to Northumberland. In between Northumberland and Mechanicville, it utilized the former routing of NY 30, which was reassigned to another highway as part of the renumbering.

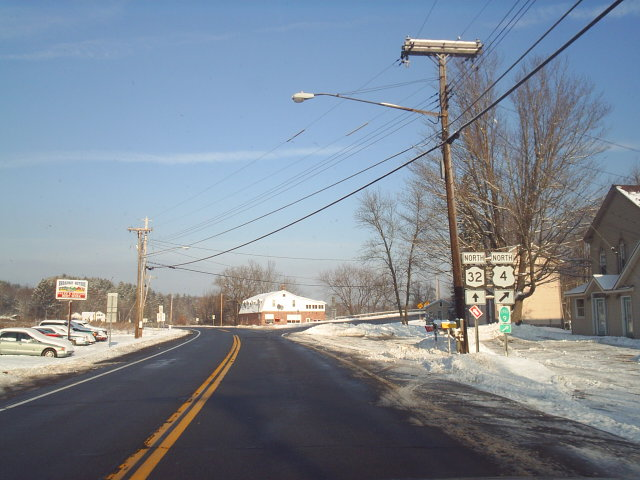
North end of the northern US 4/NY 32 overlap in Northumberland

Virtually all of US 4 south of Hudson Falls initially overlapped other routes, all of which were assigned as part of the renumbering. In between Hudson Falls and Northumberland, US 4 overlapped NY 32B, which began in Glens Falls and followed US 4's former routing east to Hudson Falls. From Northumberland to Schuylerville and from Bemis Heights to Waterford, US 4 was part of NY 32. The segment from Schuylerville to Bemis Heights was designated NY 32A. Lastly, the part of US 4 south of Northern Drive (then-NY 40) in Troy was concurrent to NY 40. By 1932, NY 40 was rerouted through Troy to follow a more easterly alignment through the city. The realignment moved the northern end of the overlap southward to the junction of US 4 and Winter Street in North Greenbush.

Most of the overlaps were eliminated as time went on. In the early 1940s, NY 32A was reassigned to another highway in the Catskill Mountains while NY 32B was truncated to end in Hudson Falls. The former routing of NY 32A became a realignment of NY 32, creating an uninterrupted overlap between US 4 and NY 32 from Waterford to Northumberland. In the mid-1950s, work began on a project to upgrade a preexisting riverside highway between Bemis Heights and Schuylerville. The project was completed by 1958, at which time the roadway became part of a realigned US 4. The overlap with NY 40 was eliminated in the late 1950s when NY 40 was truncated to begin at the junction of US 4 and Winter Street.

== Major intersections ==
| County | Location | mi | km | Destinations | Notes |
|---|---|---|---|---|---|
| Rensselaer | Town of East Greenbush | 0.00 | 0.00 | US 9 / US 20 to I-90 – Schodack Center, Rensselaer | National southern terminus; hamlet of East Greenbush |
| Rensselaer | Town of East Greenbush | 1.50 | 2.41 | NY 151 – Luther, Rensselaer | Traffic circle; hamlet of Couse Corners |
| Rensselaer | Town of East Greenbush | 1.93 | 3.11 | I-90 – Albany, Boston | Exit 9 on I-90 |
| Rensselaer | Town of East Greenbush | 3.23 | 5.20 | NY 915E west (Third Avenue Extension) – Rensselaer | Formerly NY 43; eastern terminus of unsigned NY 915E |
| Rensselaer | North Greenbush | 3.99 | 6.42 | NY 43 to I-90 – Rensselaer, West Sand Lake | Hamlet of Defreestville |
| Rensselaer | North Greenbush | 5.62 | 9.04 | CR 74 east (Winter Street Extension) | Former western terminus of NY 405 |
| Rensselaer | North Greenbush | 6.61 | 10.64 | NY 136 east – Wynantskill | Western terminus of NY 136 |
| Rensselaer | Troy | 7.89 | 12.70 | NY 378 west (Troy–Menands Bridge) to I-787 – Menands | Eastern terminus of NY 378 |
| Rensselaer | Troy | 9.55 | 15.37 | NY 2 east (Ferry Street) – Brunswick | One-way eastbound |
| Rensselaer | Troy | 9.62 | 15.48 | NY 2 west (Congress Street) to I-787 / I-87 – Watervliet | One-way westbound |
| Rensselaer | Troy | 10.07 | 16.21 | Green Island Bridge / NY 915B | Eastern terminus of unsigned NY 915B |
| Rensselaer | Troy | 10.43 | 16.79 | Hoosick Street to NY 7 east | |
| Rensselaer | Troy | 10.63 | 17.11 | Jay Street to NY 7 west / I-787 / I-87 | |
| Rensselaer | Troy | 12.65 | 20.36 | NY 470 west (112th Street Bridge) to I-787 – Cohoes | Eastern terminus of NY 470; Lansingburgh section |
| Rensselaer | Troy | 13.80 | 22.21 | NY 142 east (125th Street) – Brunswick | Western terminus of NY 142; Lansingburgh section |
| Saratoga | Village of Waterford | 14.27 | 22.97 | NY 32 south (Broad Street) / Lakes to Locks Passage – Cohoes | Southern terminus of concurrency with NY 32 |
| Saratoga | Halfmoon | 21.71 | 34.94 | NY 146 west to I-87 – Clifton Park | Eastern terminus of NY 146 |
| Saratoga | Mechanicville | 23.07 | 37.13 | NY 67 west (Saratoga Avenue) to I-87 – Round Lake, Malta, Ballston Spa | Southern terminus of concurrency with NY 67 |
| Saratoga | Mechanicville | 23.17 | 37.29 | NY 67 east (North Main Street) – Schaghticoke | Northern terminus of concurrency with NY 67 |
| Saratoga | Village of Stillwater | 25.79 | 41.50 | Stillwater Bridge Road / NY 915C – Schaghticoke, Lock 4 State Canal Park | Former routing of NY 67; western terminus of unsigned NY 915C |
| Saratoga | Town of Stillwater | 28.39 | 45.69 | NY 32 north – Saratoga Lake | Northern terminus of concurrency with NY 32; hamlet of Bemis Heights |
| Saratoga | Schuylerville | 37.88 | 60.96 | NY 32 south – Victory | Southern terminus of concurrency with NY 32 |
| Saratoga | Schuylerville | 37.94 | 61.06 | CR 338 west (Burgoyne Street) | Former eastern terminus of NY 338 |
| Saratoga | Schuylerville | 38.08 | 61.28 | NY 29 east (Ferry Street) – Greenwich | Southern terminus of concurrency with NY 29 |
| Saratoga | Schuylerville | 38.37 | 61.75 | NY 29 west to I-87 – Saratoga Springs | Northern terminus of concurrency with NY 29 |
| Saratoga | Northumberland | 40.13 | 64.58 | NY 32 north – Glens Falls | Northern terminus of concurrency with NY 32; hamlet of Northumberland |
| Washington | Village of Fort Edward | 50.11 | 80.64 | NY 197 east – Argyle | Southern terminus of concurrency with NY 197 |
| Washington | Village of Fort Edward | 50.53 | 81.32 | NY 197 west to I-87 | Northern terminus of concurrency with NY 197 |
| Washington | Hudson Falls | 52.98 | 85.26 | NY 196 east (Maple Street) – Hartford | Traffic circle; western terminus of NY 196 |
| Washington | Hudson Falls | 53.04 | 85.36 | NY 254 west (River Street) to I-87 – Glens Falls, Queensbury | Traffic circle; eastern terminus of NY 254 |
| Washington | Kingsbury | 54.48 | 87.68 | NY 32 – Glens Falls | |
| Washington | Kingsbury | 60.74 | 97.75 | NY 149 east – Granville | Southern terminus of concurrency with NY 149 |
| Washington | Village of Fort Ann | 62.62 | 100.78 | NY 149 west to I-87 – Queensbury, Lake George | Northern terminus of conurrency with NY 149 |
| Washington | Town of Fort Ann | 66.45 | 106.94 | NY 22 south – Comstock, Granville | Southern terminus of concurrency with NY 22; hamlet of Comstock |
| Washington | Village of Whitehall | 73.18 | 117.77 | NY 22 north / Lakes to Locks Passage – Ticonderoga | Northern terminus of concurrency with NY 22 |
| Washington | Hampton | 79.67 | 128.22 | US 4 east to VT 4A – Fair Haven, Rutland | Hamlet of Low Hampton; continuation into Vermont |
1.000 mi = 1.609 km; 1.000 km = 0.621 mi: Concurrency terminus

== See also ==
U.S. Route 4
| Previous state: Terminus | New York | Next state: Vermont |
