= New York State Route 142 =

State highway in Rensselaer County, New York, US

New York State Route 142
- Map of Rensselaer County in eastern New York with NY 142 highlighted in red

Route information
- Maintained by NYSDOT and the city of Troy
- Length: 3.83 mi (6.16 km)
- Existed: c. 1938–present

Major junctions
- South end: NY 7 in Brunswick
- NY 40 in Troy
- North end: US 4 in Troy

Location
- Country: United States
- State: New York
- Counties: Rensselaer

Highway system
- New York Highways; Interstate; US; State; Reference; Parkways
← NY 141	→ NY 143

New York State Route 142 (NY 142) is a north–south state highway in Rensselaer County, New York, in the United States. The southern terminus is at an intersection with NY 7 in the hamlet of Brunswick Center within the town of Brunswick. Its northern terminus is at U.S. Route 4 (US 4) in the neighborhood of Lansingburgh within the city of Troy. NY 142 serves as a northeasterly bypass of Troy.

== Route description ==
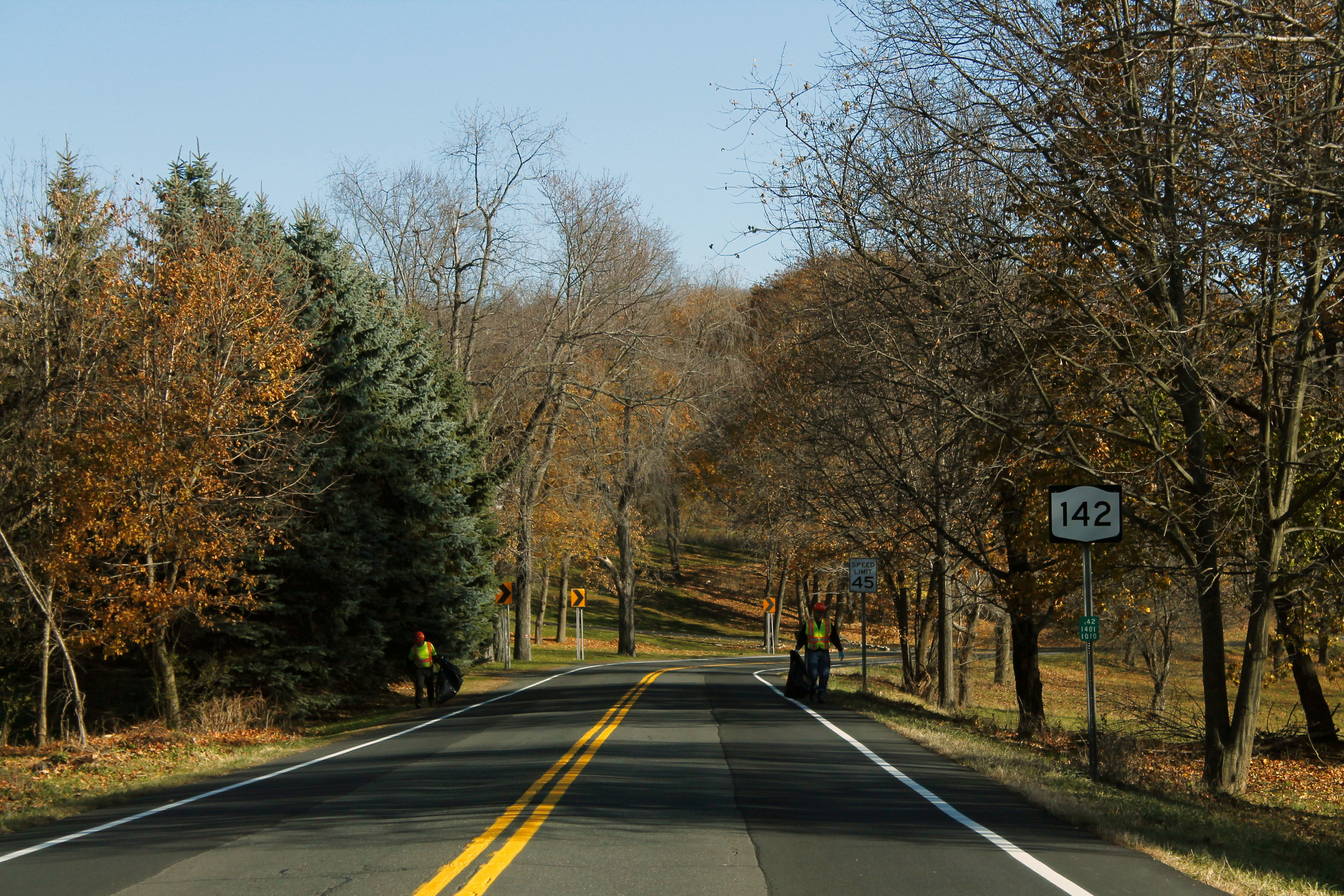
Curve on NY 142

NY 142 begins at an intersection with NY 7 (Hoosick Street) in the community of Brunswick Center, New York. The route heads to the northwest along Grange Road through the residential community, intersecting with local roads. At an intersection with County Route 144 (CR 144), also the eastern terminus of former NY 317, NY 142 passes through a large condominium complex before bending to the west and into Vanderheyden Park. Paralleling to the north of the park, NY 142 intersects with a former alignment of itself through Brunswick. At the intersection with Farrell Road, NY 142 turns northward into farmlands until the intersection with Haleah Drive in the city of Troy. There, NY 142 becomes known as Livingston Street and passes around a large pond. At an intersection with CR 128 (Plank Road), NY 142 turns along Northern Drive and intersects with NY 40 (Leversee Road).

NY 40 and NY 142 have a short concurrency before NY 40 turns southward along Oakwood Avenue towards downtown Troy. At an intersection with Gurley Avenue, NY 142 continues along Northern Drive and enters the local greens on Oil Mill Hill. There, the highway intersects with CR 116 (Oil Mill Hill Road). A short distance later, NY 142 re-enters downtown Troy passing through the residential and commercial districts. At the intersection with 125th Street, the designation turns off of Northern Drive and heads westward into the Lansingburgh district. There NY 142 terminates at an intersection with US 4 (Second Avenue).

== History ==
The portion of 125th Street and Northern Drive from US 4 (2nd Avenue) to Old Mill Hill Road was originally designated as part of NY 40 in the 1930 renumbering of state highways in New York. NY 40 was realigned by 1932 to follow Leversee Road and Oakwood Avenue through the eastern outskirts of Troy. Its former routing along 125th Street and Northern Drive was incorporated into the new NY 142, a route extending from US 4 in Troy to NY 7 in Brunswick Center, c. 1938.

== Major intersections ==
The entire route is in Rensselaer County.

Location	mi	km	Destinations	Notes
Brunswick	0.00	0.00	NY 7 (Hoosick Street)	Hamlet of Brunswick Center
Brunswick	0.69	1.11	CR 144 (Lake Road)	Former eastern terminus of NY 317
Troy	2.76	4.44	NY 40 north (Leversee Road)	Southern terminus of concurrency with NY 40
Troy	2.84	4.57	NY 40 south (Oakwood Road)	Northern terminus of concurrency with NY 40
Troy	3.83	6.16	US 4 (Second Avenue)	Neighborhood of Lansingburgh
1.000 mi = 1.609 km; 1.000 km = 0.621 mi: Concurrency terminus
