= Fort Ann (village), New York =

Fort Ann
- Village
- Location in Washington County and the state of New York.
- Coordinates: 43°24′51″N 73°29′16″W
- Country: United States
- State: New York
- County: Washington
- Metro Area: Glens Falls, New York
- Town: Town of Fort Ann
- Fort Built: 1757
- Incorporated: 1820

Area
  - Total: 0.29 sq mi (0.76 km^{2})
  - Land: 0.29 sq mi (0.74 km^{2})
  - Water: 0.0077 sq mi (0.02 km^{2})
- Elevation: 157 ft (48 m)

Population (2020)
  - Total: 460
  - Density: 1,610.9/sq mi (621.99/km^{2})
- Time zone: UTC-5 (Eastern (EST))
  - Summer (DST): UTC-4 (EDT)
- ZIP code: 12827
- Area code: 518
- FIPS code: 36-26704
- GNIS feature ID: 0950461
- Website: www.fortann.us<defunct>

Fort Ann is a village in Washington County, New York, United States. It is part of the Glens Falls Metropolitan Statistical Area. The village population was 484 at the 2010 census. The name is derived indirectly from Queen Anne and the local fortification built in 1757 and named after her.

The village of Fort Ann is part of the town of Fort Ann at the junction of U.S. Route 4 and New York State Route 149.

== History ==
The area was the location of several military forts, built from 1690 to 1777. The first was constructed during King William's War and the last during the American Revolution. Two early forts were called "Fort Schuyler" and the "Queen's Fort." Also Fort Ann was the site of the 1777 Battle of Fort Anne during the Saratoga Campaign.

The village was incorporated in 1820. The Champlain Canal, completed in 1823, passes through the village. Later, the Delaware & Hudson Railroad came.

Old Stone House Library was added to the National Register of Historic Places in 2012.

== Geography ==
According to the United States Census Bureau, the village has a total area of 0.3 square miles (0.78 km^{2}), all land.

Fort Ann is located adjacent to the town lines of Kingsbury and Hartford.

In addition to U.S. 4 and NY 149, County Road 4 enters the village.

== Demographics ==
Historical population
Census	Pop.	Note	%±
1870	639		—
1900	431		—
1910	436		1.2%
1920	338		−22.5%
1930	389		15.1%
1940	439		12.9%
1950	463		5.5%
1960	453		−2.2%
1970	562		24.1%
1980	509		−9.4%
1990	419		−17.7%
2000	471		12.4%
2010	484		2.8%
2020	460		−5.0%
U.S. Decennial Census

As of the census of 2000, there were 471 people, 187 households, and 127 families residing in the village. The population density was 1,570.8 people per square mile (606.5 people/km^{2}). There were 212 housing units at an average density of 707 per square mile (273/km^{2}). The racial makeup of the village was 99.36% white, 0.21% black or African American, .21% Native American, and .21% from two or more races. Hispanic or Latino of any race were .64% of the population.

There were 187 households, out of which 30.5% had children under the age of 18 living with them, 48.7% were married couples living together, 16% had a female householder with no husband present, and 31.6% were non-families. 23.5% of all households were made up of individuals, and 11.2% had someone living alone who was 65 years of age or older. The average household size was 2.52 and the average family size was 3.01.

In the village, the population was spread out, with 22.9% under the age of 18, 11.5% from 18 to 24, 26.5% from 25 to 44, 23.8% from 45 to 64, and 15.3% who were 65 years of age or older. The median age was 37 years. For every 100 females, there were 97.9 males. For every 100 females age 18 and over, there were 86.2 males.

The median income for a household in the village was $44,318, and the median income for a family was $48,750. Men had a median income of $31,875 versus $24,375 for women. The per capita income for the village was $22,201. About 8.4% of families and 9.1% of the population were below the poverty line, including 14.8% of those under age 18 and 2.4% of those age 65 or over.
