= Kingsbury, New York =

Hamlet in the state of New York, United States

Kingsbury
- Town
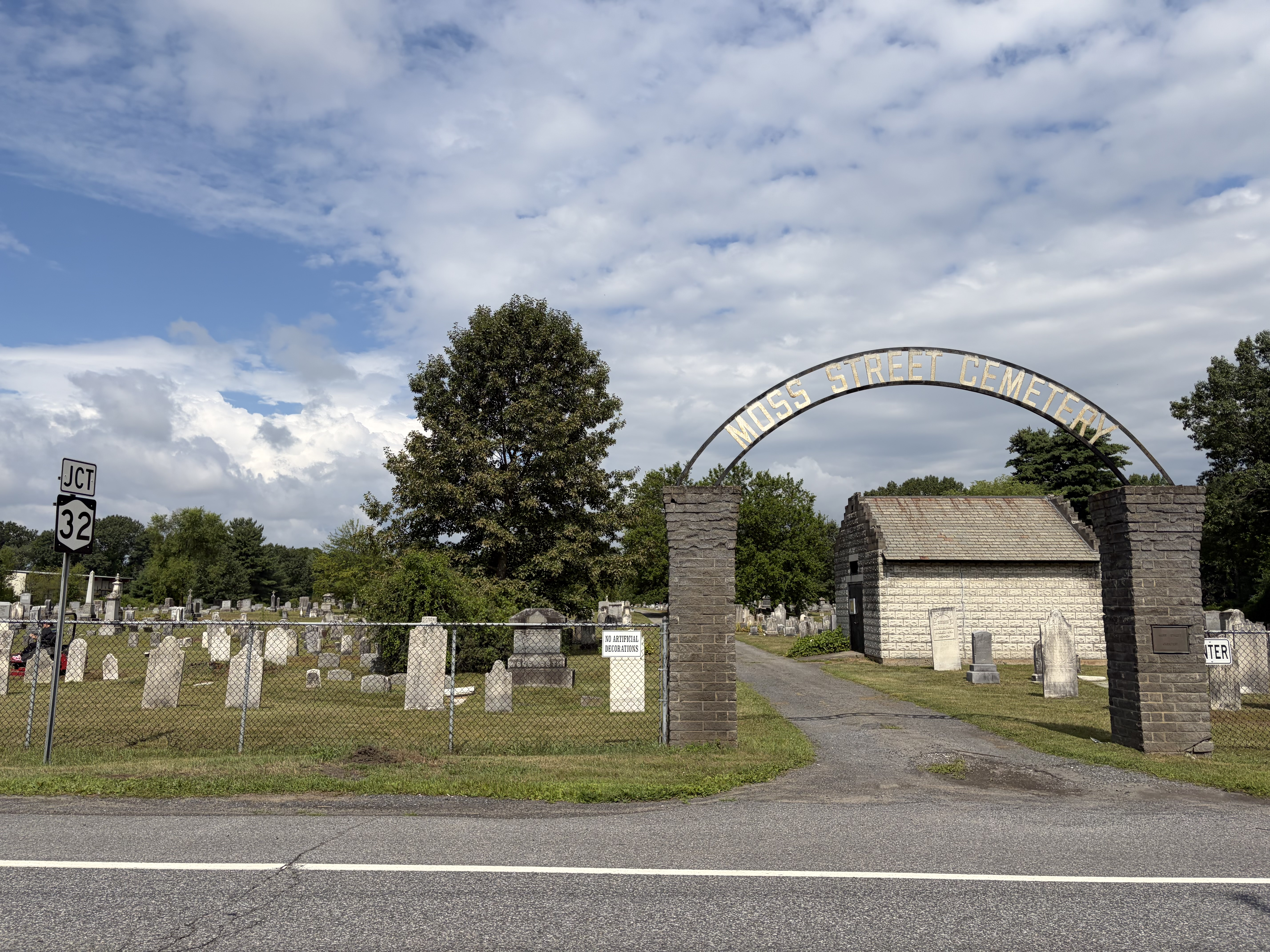
- The Moss Street Cemetery in Kingsbury

- Location in Washington County and the state of New York.
- Coordinates: 43°19′10″N 73°33′41″W
- Country: United States
- State: New York
- County: Washington

Government
  - Supervisor: Dana Hogan

Area
  - Total: 40.02 sq mi (103.65 km^{2})
  - Land: 39.69 sq mi (102.80 km^{2})
  - Water: 0.33 sq mi (0.85 km^{2})
- Elevation: 272 ft (83 m)

Population (2020)
  - Total: 12,968
- Time zone: UTC-5 (Eastern (EST))
  - Summer (DST): UTC-4 (EDT)
- ZIP codes: 12839 (primary): 12804 Queensbury; 12827 Fort Ann; 12828 Fort Edward
- Area code: 518
- FIPS code: 36-39650
- GNIS feature ID: 0979117

Kingsbury is a town in western Washington County, New York, United States. It is part of the Glens Falls Metropolitan Statistical Area. The town population was 12,968 at the 2020 census, up from 12,671 at the 2010 census.

== History ==
A charter for a Township of Kingsbury was granted by King George III on May 11, 1762. It was named after a small parish on the western outskirts of London. Its first settler was James Bradshaw. Albert Baker arrived second, constructing a sawmill at what is today known as Baker's Falls. John Jones built a mill in the northwest corner of town. Following his death, Edward Patten purchased Jones' land and renamed the settlement Pattens Mills, a name by which it is still known.

During the American Revolutionary War, General John Burgoyne and his troops passed through the town after the Battle of Fort Anne. In 1780, Major Christopher Carleton led a raid that set fire to everything but the homes of Loyalists.

Charlotte County, of which Kingbury was a part, was annexed by the Vermont Republic in 1781. The following year, it renounced its claim to Charlotte County, and New York officially recognized the town of Kingsbury. In 1810, the settlement near Baker's Falls incorporated as the village of Sandy Hill, though it changed its name to Hudson Falls in 1910.

In 1823, the Champlain Canal was opened, followed in 1833 by the Glens Falls Feeder Canal. Major industry consisted of farming, milling, mining, and logging. Limestone was produced at Smiths Basin.

== Geography ==
According to the United States Census Bureau, the town has a total area of 40.0 square miles (104 km^{2}), of which 39.9 square miles (103 km^{2}) is land and 0.2 square miles (0.52 km^{2}) (0.37%) is water.

Part of the western town line is the border of Saratoga County and the remainder is the border of Warren County.

NY 196 crosses the southern part of Kingsbury from east to west. NY 149 runs along part of the eastern town line and intersects US 4, which runs from Hudson Falls through the northeastern section of the town. The Champlain Canal, part of the NYS canal system, passes through the eastern part of the town.

== Demographics ==
Historical population
Census	Pop.	Note	%±
1820	2,203		—
1830	2,606		18.3%
1840	2,773		6.4%
1850	3,032		9.3%
1860	3,471		14.5%
1870	4,277		23.2%
1880	4,614		7.9%
1890	4,677		1.4%
1900	6,100		30.4%
1910	7,080		16.1%
1920	7,336		3.6%
1930	8,094		10.3%
1940	8,697		7.4%
1950	9,503		9.3%
1960	11,012		15.9%
1970	11,737		6.6%
1980	11,660		−0.7%
1990	11,851		1.6%
2000	11,171		−5.7%
2010	12,671		13.4%
2020	12,968		2.3%
U.S. Decennial Census

As of the census of 2000, there were 11,171 people, 4,491 households, and 2,955 families residing in the town. The population density was 280.2 inhabitants per square mile (108.2/km^{2}). There were 4,823 housing units at an average density of 121.0 per square mile (46.7/km^{2}). The racial makeup of the town was 98.17% White, 0.37% African American, 0.27% Native American, 0.21% Asian, 0.01% Pacific Islander, 0.13% from other races, and 0.84% from two or more races. Hispanic or Latino of any race were 0.60% of the population.

There were 4,491 households, out of which 31.8% had children under the age of 18 living with them, 48.0% were married couples living together, 13.0% had a female householder with no husband present, and 34.2% were non-families. 27.6% of all households were made up of individuals, and 12.0% had someone living alone who was 65 years of age or older. The average household size was 2.46 and the average family size was 2.97.

In the town, the population was spread out, with 25.0% under the age of 18, 8.2% from 18 to 24, 30.2% from 25 to 44, 22.4% from 45 to 64, and 14.2% who were 65 years of age or older. The median age was 37 years. For every 100 females, there were 92.1 males. For every 100 females age 18 and over, there were 88.2 males.

The median income for a household in the town was $34,919, and the median income for a family was $41,507. Males had a median income of $31,200 versus $21,425 for females. The per capita income for the town was $18,433. About 9.1% of families and 12.6% of the population were below the poverty line, including 21.3% of those under age 18 and 5.7% of those age 65 or over.

== Communities and locations in the Town of Kingsbury ==
=== Communities ===
- Adamsville – A hamlet at the eastern town line on NY 196.
- Baldwin Corner – A hamlet in the northeastern part of the town on US 4.
- Dunham Basin – A location east of Hudson Falls, associated with the Champlain Canal.
- Hudson Falls – A village that once was the county seat of Washington County until 1994, when the county seat was moved to Fort Edward.
- Kingsbury – A hamlet on US 4..
- Pattens Mills – A hamlet in the northwestern corner of Kingsbury on CR 35.
- Smiths Basin – A hamlet east of Kingsbury on NY 149 at the Champlain Canal.
- Vaughns Corners – A hamlet north of Hudson Falls at the intersection of CR 35 and CR 36.

=== Geographical features ===
- Big Creek – A stream feeding into the Champlain Canal near Smiths Basin.
- Bond Creek – A stream feeding into the Champlain Canal near Dunham Basin.
- Wood Creek – A stream flowing out the southern town line.

== Government ==
The town is led by a Town Supervisor and four-member Town Board. As of 2016, Dana Hogan was the Town Supervisor.
