= Glens Falls Feeder Canal =

- U.S. National Register of Historic Places
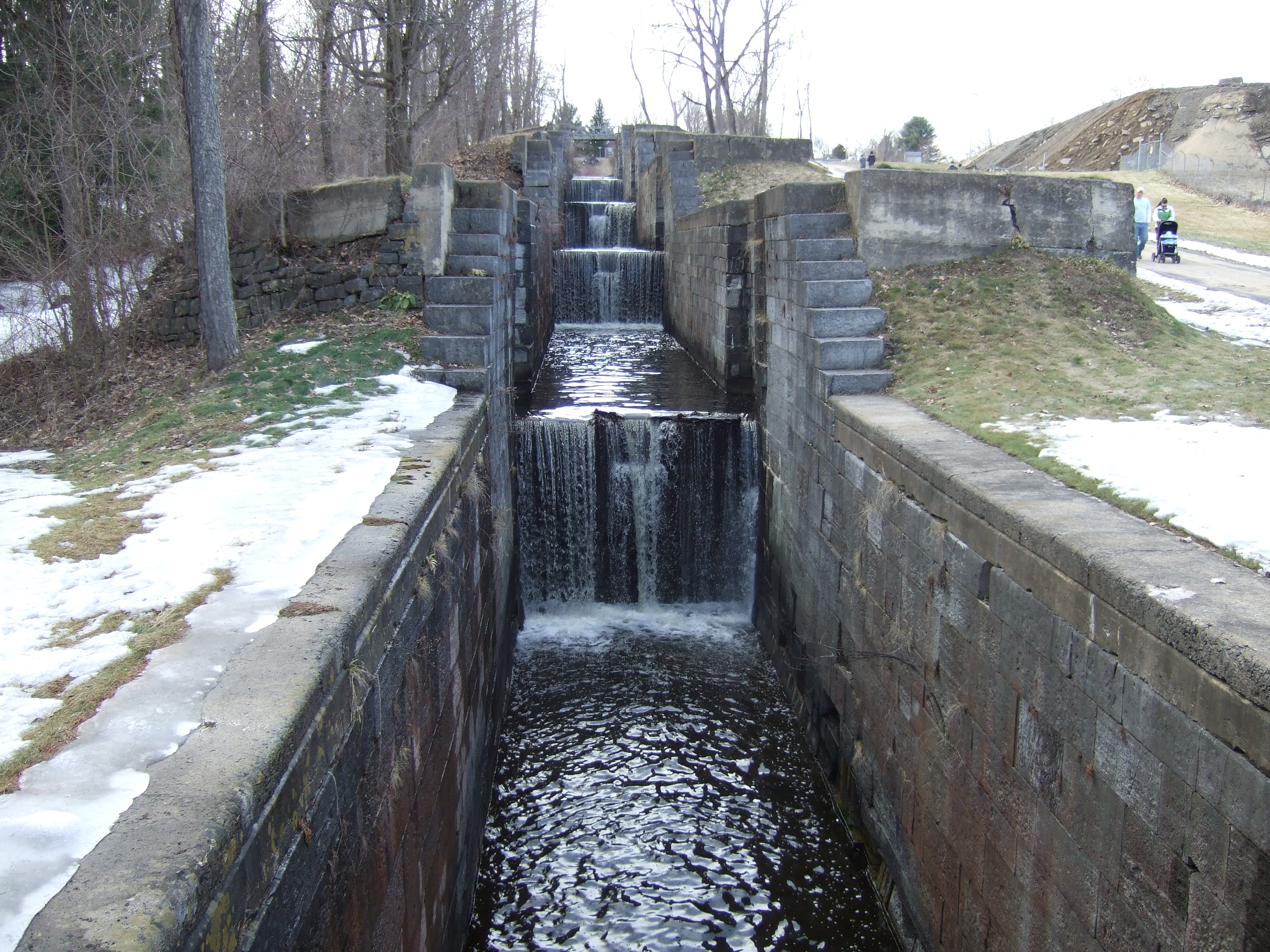
- "The Combine" : a series of five locks on the Feeder Canal in Fort Edward, New York

- Location within New York Location within the United States
- Location: Warren / Washington counties, New York, USA
- Coordinates: 43°18′28.5″N 73°37′36″W
- Built: 1822
- NRHP reference No.: 85003401
- Added to NRHP: October 25, 1985

The Glens Falls Feeder Canal is a canal from Glens Falls, New York, United States through Hudson Falls and into Fort Edward. It is seven miles (11 km) long and delivers water from above Glens Falls on the Hudson River to the highest point of the Champlain Canal. The Feeder Canal Heritage Trail runs along a large part of the canal.

== History ==
The first Feeder Canal was constructed around 1822 at the foot of Fort Edward Hill, to direct water from the Hudson River one-half mile (0.80 km) east to the Champlain Canal. When a flood destroyed part of the dam across the Hudson River at Fort Edward, the feeder canal failed to provide enough water.

In 1824 a new dam was built across the Hudson River upstream of Glens Falls and digging of the Glens Falls Feeder Canal began. It ran seven miles (11 km) eastward to join the Champlain Canal, guaranteeing adequate water at its highest elevation.

In 1832, the Feeder Canal was widened and deepened to accommodate boat traffic as well. Thirteen masonry locks were constructed to overcome the 130-foot (40 m) vertical drop east of Sandy Hill (now called Hudson Falls). This engineering feat includes the "Five Combines" Locks in Hudson Falls (at the intersection of Pine Street and Burgoyne Avenue. The Combine Locks lower water 55 vertical feet (17 m). The locks were 15 feet (4.6 m) wide and 100 feet (30 m) long; these dimensions controlled the size of canal boats in the Champlain Canal system while the locks were in use. The present-day Champlain Barge Canal eliminated the need for boat traffic on the Feeder Canal in the early 1900s.

== Present day ==
Today the canal is still an important source of water for the Champlain Canal as well as the Finch Pruyn & Company Paper Mill, which lies just east of the start of the Canal in Glens Falls. It is maintained by the New York State Canal Corporation.

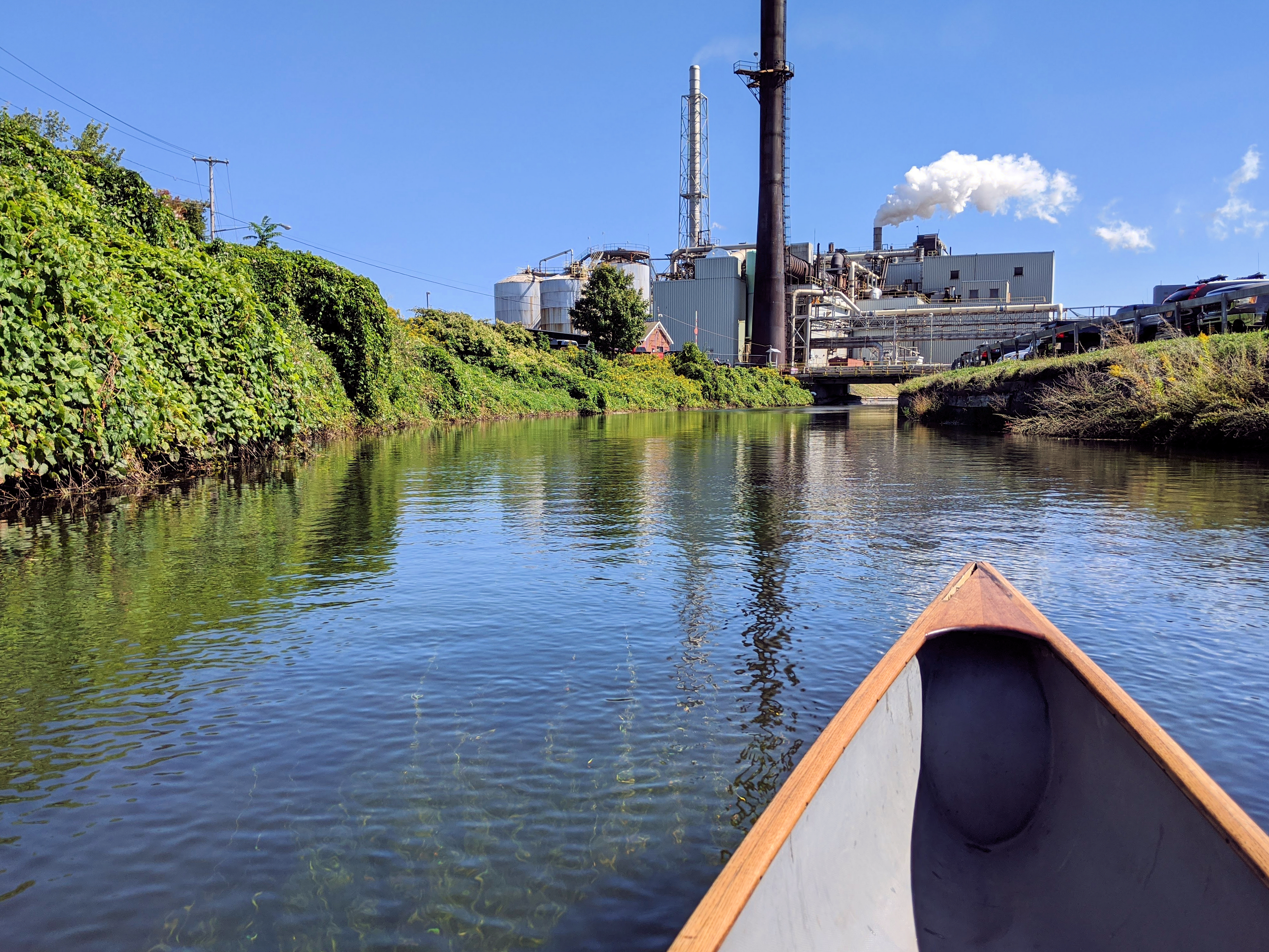
Glens Falls Feeder Canal near the Finch Paper plant.

The canal is a popular destination for canoeing and kayaking. A seven-mile (11 km) long park/trail along the old canal towpath is frequented by tourists and joggers and cyclists. The canal was added to the National Register of Historic Places in 1985. The not-for-profit Feeder Canal Alliance was formed in 1987 to preserve, promote and maintain the Feeder Canal.
