= Fort Edward (village), New York =

Fort Edward
- Village
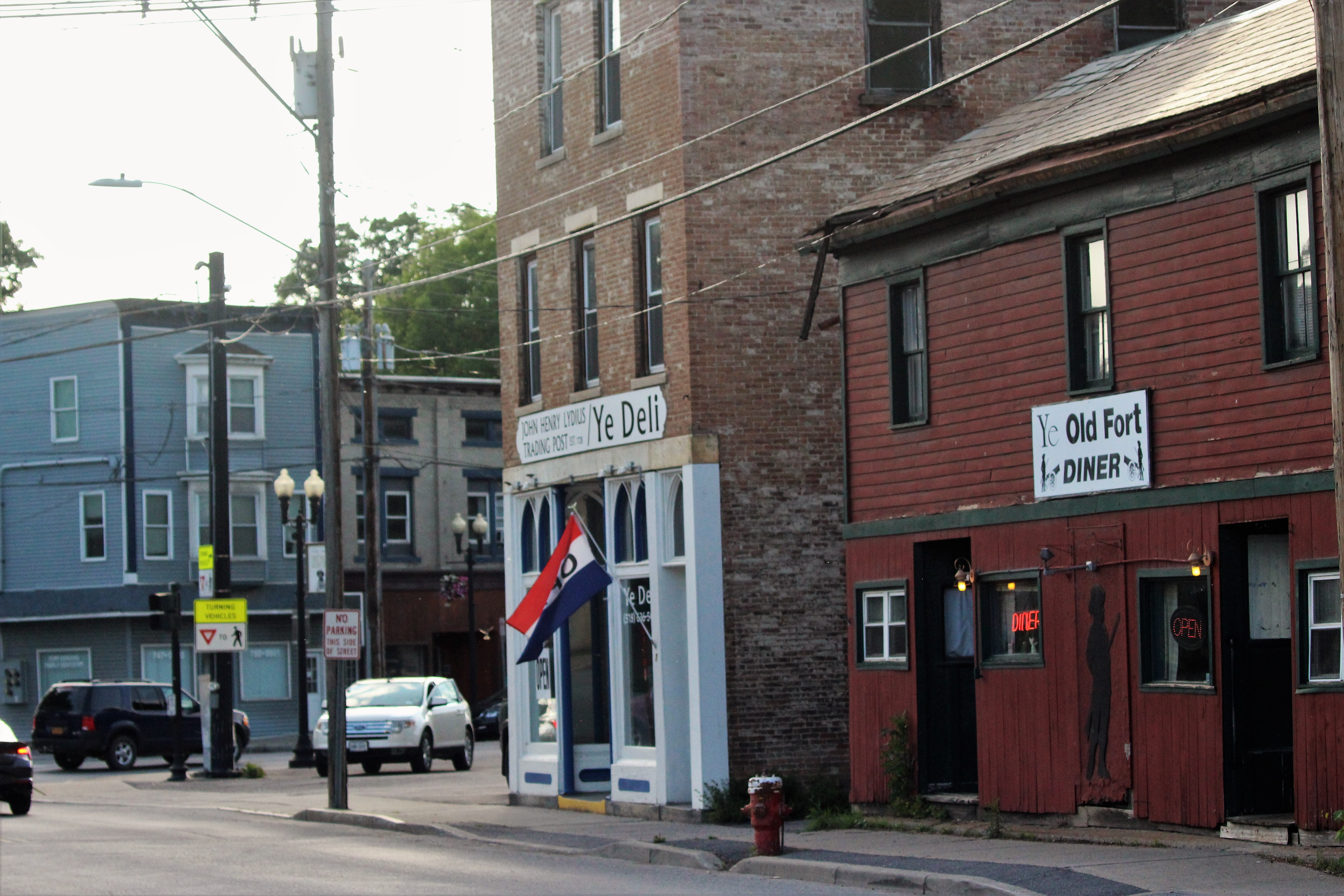
- East Street

- Location in Washington County and the state of New York.
- Coordinates: 43°16′6″N 73°35′5″W
- Country: United States
- State: New York
- County: Washington

Area
  - Total: 1.92 sq mi (4.96 km^{2})
  - Land: 1.76 sq mi (4.56 km^{2})
  - Water: 0.15 sq mi (0.39 km^{2})
- Elevation: 138 ft (42 m)

Population (2020)
  - Total: 3,108
  - Density: 1,764.1/sq mi (681.14/km^{2})
- Time zone: UTC-5 (Eastern (EST))
  - Summer (DST): UTC-4 (EDT)
- ZIP code: 12828
- Area code: 518
- FIPS code: 36-26770
- GNIS feature ID: 0950467
- Website: villageoffortedward.gov

Fort Edward is a village in Washington County, New York, United States. It is part of the Glens Falls Metropolitan Statistical Area. The village population was 3,375 at the 2010 census. The name is derived from the younger brother of King George III, Edward Augustus, Duke of York and Albany.

The village is part of the town of Fort Edward, which contains the county seat of Washington County just north of the village limits.

== History ==
=== Early history ===
Fort Edward has been strategically important during its history, for it commands the Hudson River and Champlain River valleys. The Hudson River at this point north is no longer a navigable waterway because of waterfalls and rapids. Historically, travelers through this area would leave the Hudson at Fort Edward and carry their canoes overland to Lake George. The Native Americans called the area around Fort Edward Wahcoloosencoochaleva, which means "The Great Carrying Place." Fort Edward's location was the most northerly point on the Hudson River for the early Dutch, and was near the boundary between the Province of New York and New France.

As early as 1709 during Queen Anne's War, a stockade (Fort Nicholson) was erected in the area due to its strategic importance. Fort Nicholson was garrisoned by 450 men, including seven companies of “regulars in scarlet uniform from old England.” A crude stockade was built to protect storehouses and log huts. It was later abandoned and then re-constructed in 1731 as Fort Lydius, the trading post of John Lydius, a fur trader from Albany. In 1755, the fortification was reconstructed as Fort Lyman during the French and Indian War. However, Sir William Johnson that same year renamed it Fort Edward. Also at this time, a large military complex was constructed on nearby Roger's Island. Today this site is listed on the National Register of Historic Places (NRHP). Another smaller fort was constructed on the opposite shore of the Hudson River.

During the American Revolution, the area was taken by British forces under John Burgoyne in 1777.

=== Post Colonial history ===
The completion of the Champlain Canal, in 1823, linked the areas to the north and south, and replaced a smaller canal that bypassed local rapids.

The village of Fort Edward incorporated in 1849, setting itself off from the town of Fort Edward.

=== The Old Fort House Museum ===
The Old Fort House Museum Campus on Lower Broadway in the village is home to the Fort Edward Historical Association. It houses:

- The Old Fort House, built in 1772 from timbers salvaged from the abandoned Fort Edward,
- An 1840s Plank Road Tollhouse,
- The 1853 law office of a Washington County Judge who practiced law in Fort Edward,
- The one-room Riverside Schoolhouse,
- The Cronkhite Pavilion, which features Native American, military, and historic displays regarding the Fort Edward area, and
- The Fort Edward Water Works Barn, which houses exhibits on early transportation and farming.

== Geography ==
According to the United States Census Bureau, the village has a total area of 1.9 square miles (5.0 km^{2}), of which 1.8 square miles (4.6 km^{2}) is land and 0.1 square mile (0.4 km^{2}) (7.25%) is water.

New York Route 197 joins U.S. Route 4 at Fort Edward, and the Champlain Canal joins the Hudson River south of the village.

Fort Edward is on the opposite shore of the Hudson River from the town of Moreau in Saratoga County.

== Demographics ==
Historical population
Census	Pop.	Note	%±
1870	3,492		—
1900	3,521		—
1910	3,762		6.8%
1920	3,871		2.9%
1930	3,850		−0.5%
1940	3,620		−6.0%
1950	3,797		4.9%
1960	3,737		−1.6%
1970	3,733		−0.1%
1980	3,561		−4.6%
1990	3,561		0.0%
2000	3,141		−11.8%
2010	3,375		7.4%
2020	3,108		−7.9%
U.S. Decennial Census

As of the census of 2000, there were 3,141 people, 1,247 households, and 835 families residing in the village. The population density was 1,751.1 inhabitants per square mile (676.1/km^{2}). There were 1,399 housing units at an average density of 779.9 per square mile (301.1/km^{2}). The racial makeup of the village was 98.69% White, 0.35% Black or African American, 0.19% Native American, 0.38% Asian, and 0.38% from two or more races. Hispanic or Latino of any race were 0.29% of the population.

There were 1,247 households, out of which 33.8% had children under the age of 18 living with them, 45.5% were married couples living together, 15.9% had a female householder with no husband present, and 33.0% were non-families. 26.9% of all households were made up of individuals, and 11.3% had someone living alone who was 65 years of age or older. The average household size was 2.50 and the average family size was 2.99.

In the village, the population was spread out, with 26.3% under the age of 18, 8.6% from 18 to 24, 30.9% from 25 to 44, 21.0% from 45 to 64, and 13.1% who were 65 years of age or older. The median age was 35 years. For every 100 females, there were 93.2 males. For every 100 females age 18 and over, there were 89.8 males.

The median income for a household in the village was $32,347, and the median income for a family was $39,550. Males had a median income of $35,380 versus $22,361 for females. The per capita income for the village was $17,555. About 7.9% of families and 11.2% of the population were below the poverty line, including 14.7% of those under age 18 and 2.4% of those age 65 or over.
