= East Greenbush (CDP), New York =

East Greenbush, New York
- CDP
- Location in Rensselaer County and the state of New York.

- Location within the state of New York
- Coordinates: 42°35′33″N 73°42′9″W
- Country: United States
- State: New York
- County: Rensselaer

Area
  - Total: 3.93 sq mi (10.19 km^{2})
  - Land: 3.92 sq mi (10.15 km^{2})
  - Water: 0.015 sq mi (0.04 km^{2})
- Elevation: 341 ft (104 m)

Population (2020)
  - Total: 6,266
  - Density: 1,599.5/sq mi (617.57/km^{2})
- Time zone: UTC-5 (Eastern (EST))
  - Summer (DST): UTC-4 (EDT)
- ZIP code: 12061
- Area code: 518
- FIPS code: 36-22106
- GNIS feature ID: 0949084

East Greenbush is a census-designated place (CDP) in Rensselaer County, New York, United States. The population was 6,266 at the 2020 census.

East Greenbush is mostly within the southern part of the town of East Greenbush, but a small section of the community extends southward into the town of Schodack.

U.S. Routes 9 and 20 pass through the community, and the western end of U.S. Route 4 begins immediately north of the community.

== Geography ==
East Greenbush is located at 42°35′33″N 73°42′8″W (42.59263, -73.702402).

According to the United States Census Bureau, the CDP has a total area of 2.7 square miles (6.9 km^{2}), all land.

== Demographics ==
Historical population
| Census | Pop. | Note | %± |
|---|---|---|---|
| 2020 | 6,266 | | — |
U.S. Decennial Census

As of the census of 2000, there were 4,085 people, 1,568 households, and 1,133 families residing in the CDP. The population density was 1,542.4 inhabitants per square mile (595.5/km^{2}). There were 1,615 housing units at an average density of 609.8 per square mile (235.4/km^{2}). The racial makeup of the CDP was 92.66% White, 3.21% Black or African American, 0.15% Native American, 2.59% Asian, 0.24% from other races, and 1.15% from two or more races. Hispanic or Latino of any race were 1.42% of the population.

There were 1,568 households, out of which 37.2% had children under the age of 18 living with them, 57.8% were married couples living together, 10.9% had a female householder with no husband present, and 27.7% were non-families. 20.9% of all households were made up of individuals, and 5.2% had someone living alone who was 65 years of age or older. The average household size was 2.60 and the average family size was 3.05.

In the CDP, the population was spread out, with 26.6% under the age of 18, 7.0% from 18 to 24, 31.3% from 25 to 44, 25.5% from 45 to 64, and 9.5% who were 65 years of age or older. The median age was 36 years. For every 100 females, there were 91.6 males. For every 100 females age 18 and over, there were 86.8 males.

The median income for a household in the CDP was $92,250, and the median income for a family was $75,375. Males had a median income of $62,610 versus $54,669 for females. The per capita income for the CDP was $74,492. About 2.1% of families and 2.7% of the population were below the poverty line, including 1.3% of those under age 18 and 5.5% of those age 65 or over.
