= Hudson Falls, New York =

Hudson Falls
- Village
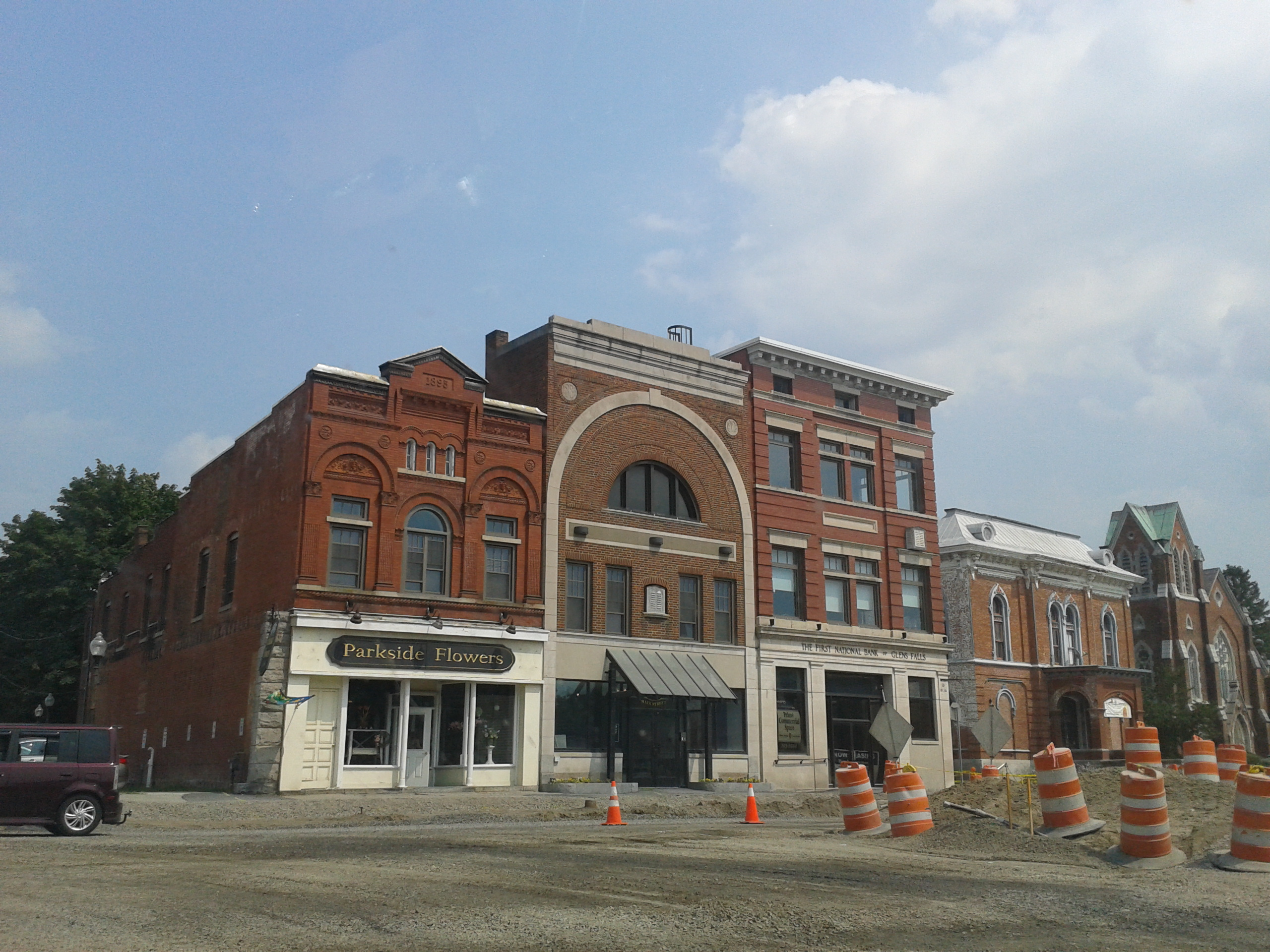
- Buildings in Hudson Falls, July 2014

- Location in Washington County and the state of New York.
- Coordinates: 43°18′8″N 73°34′50″W
- Country: United States
- State: New York
- County: Washington
- Incorporated: 1810 as Sandy Hill, 1910 as Hudson Falls

Government
  - Mayor: John Barton

Area
  - Total: 1.92 sq mi (4.97 km^{2})
  - Land: 1.86 sq mi (4.82 km^{2})
  - Water: 0.058 sq mi (0.15 km^{2})
- Elevation: 300 ft (90 m)

Population (2020)
  - Total: 7,428
  - Density: 3,989.9/sq mi (1,540.49/km^{2})
- Time zone: UTC-5 (Eastern (EST))
  - Summer (DST): UTC-4 (EDT)
- ZIP code: 12839
- Area code: 518
- FIPS code: 36-35980
- GNIS feature ID: 0974163
- Website: Village website

Hudson Falls (formerly Sandy Hill) is a village located in Washington County, New York, United States. The village is in the southwest of the town of Kingsbury, on U.S. Route 4. Hudson Falls is part of the Glens Falls Metropolitan Statistical Area. As of the 2020 census, the village had a population of 7,428. It was the county seat of Washington County until 1994, when the county seat was moved to Fort Edward.

== History ==
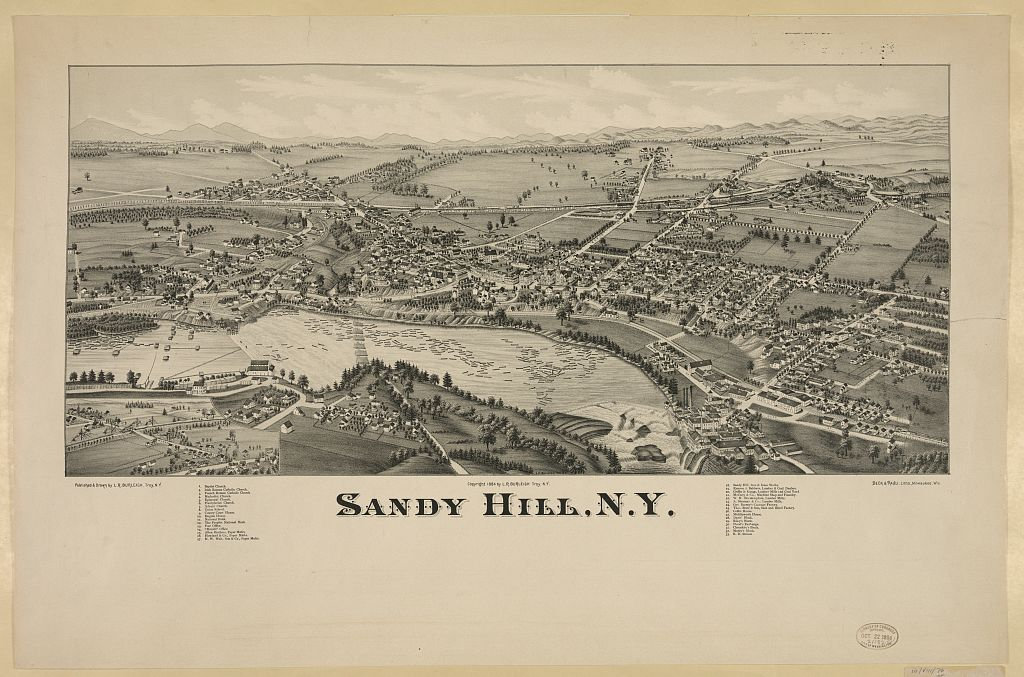
Lithograph of Sandy Hill from 1884 by L.R. Burleigh with list of landmarks

In 1764, Albert Baker built Kingsbury's first sawmill near what is known today as Baker's Falls. As early as 1792, the area of Kingsbury near Baker's Falls was referred to as Sandy Hill. In 1810, the hamlet incorporated as a village, keeping the name Sandy Hill. Its boundaries expanded to their current limits in the 1840s.

Around 1824, the Glens Falls Feeder Canal was constructed to bring water from the Hudson River to the Champlain Canal. With the opening of the Feeder Canal, Sandy Hill became a prosperous manufacturing center, producing lumber, paper, pianos, wagons, pulleys, and other products. The Glens Falls Feeder Canal is no longer used by commercial traffic, but the route of Canal is a fourteen mile long park, with a walking and bike trail on the old tow path.

Stone quarried near Hudson Falls was used to construct the Bennington Battle Monument and portions of the Brooklyn Bridge.

In 1851, Francis Wolle invented the first bag-making machine and formed a company that would later become the Union Bag and Paper Company. In 1892, the company relocated from Bethlehem, Pennsylvania, to Hudson Falls, where it had a paper mill. In 1906, the Union Paper and Bag Company built the Fenimore Bridge (Sandy Hill Bridge), spanning the Hudson River between Hudson Falls built in Washington County and the town of Moreau in Saratoga County, since the company had plants in both locations. For a brief period of time, the closed-spandrel arch bridge was the longest multiple span, reinforced-concrete arch bridge in the world. The bridge was closed to all traffic in 1989, although various plans have been proposed over the years to reopen the span; for example, in 2018, there was a proposal to convert it into a pedestrian walkway and bike path.

== Churches ==
- The First Presbyterian Church of Hudson Falls was organized in 1803. Services were held in the town courthouse until a new church building was dedicated in 1827 at the site of the Old Burying Ground. This building was demolished around 1893 to make way for a larger structure, which was dedicated in 1895.
- Zion Episcopal was founded in 1817 as the Episcopal-Methodist Church. Services were held in a parishioner's home until a new building was completed in 1849 and consecrated as Zion Episcopal Church. In 1968, lightning caused a fire that gutted the interior, which was then rebuilt.
- The first Roman Catholic church between Albany and Canada, St. Mary's, was constructed in the 1830s in Sandy Hill (later Hudson Falls) on Wall Street. It later burned down, and a new one was erected on Park Place. St. Paul's Church was founded in the 1870s to serve French Canadians in Sandy Hill. They purchased the small wooden old First Baptist Church at the top of River Street, after that congregation built a second, larger church next to the courthouse. St. Paul's erected a new, larger, brick building in the 1890s. That church was struck by lightning in 1974 and burned down. The parish subsequently merged with St. Mary's as the Church of St. Mary's/St. Paul's.

In 1910, the village's name was changed from Sandy Hill to Hudson Falls. The Glens Falls Feeder Canal, Hudson Falls Historic District, and United States Post Office are listed on the National Register of Historic Places.

== Notable people from Hudson Falls ==
- William Bronk (1918–1999), American poet
- Tony DeSare, jazz singer, pianist, and songwriter
- Townsend Harris, American merchant and politician
- Zina Hitchcock (1755–1832), New York politician
- Henry C. Martindale, New York politician
- Nathaniel Pitcher (1777–1836), New York politician
- Roger Skinner (1773–1825), New York politician and jurist

== Geography ==
According to the United States Census Bureau, the village has a total area of 1.9 square miles (4.9 km^{2}), of which 1.8 square miles (4.7 km^{2}) are land and 0.04 square miles (0.10 km^{2}) are water. The total area is 2.13% water.

The village is on the east bank of the Hudson River at the western border of Washington County. A village green lies in the center of the commercial district.

NY Route 196 (Maple Street) and NY Route 254 (River Street) intersect US Route 4 in Hudson Falls.

== Demographics ==
Historical population
| Census | Pop. | Note | %± |
|---|---|---|---|
| 1870 | 2,347 | | — |
| 1880 | 2,487 | | 6.0% |
| 1890 | 2,895 | | 16.4% |
| 1900 | 4,473 | | 54.5% |
| 1910 | 5,189 | | 16.0% |
| 1920 | 5,761 | | 11.0% |
| 1930 | 6,449 | | 11.9% |
| 1940 | 6,654 | | 3.2% |
| 1950 | 7,236 | | 8.7% |
| 1960 | 7,752 | | 7.1% |
| 1970 | 7,917 | | 2.1% |
| 1980 | 7,419 | | −6.3% |
| 1990 | 7,651 | | 3.1% |
| 2000 | 6,927 | | −9.5% |
| 2010 | 7,281 | | 5.1% |
| 2020 | 7,427 | | 2.0% |
U.S. Decennial Census

=== 2020 census ===
As of the 2020 census, Hudson Falls had a population of 7,427. The median age was 39.0 years. 22.6% of residents were under the age of 18 and 15.8% of residents were 65 years of age or older. For every 100 females there were 89.5 males, and for every 100 females age 18 and over there were 87.6 males age 18 and over.

100.0% of residents lived in urban areas, while 0.0% lived in rural areas.

There were 3,170 households in Hudson Falls, of which 28.7% had children under the age of 18 living in them. Of all households, 32.7% were married-couple households, 21.3% were households with a male householder and no spouse or partner present, and 33.9% were households with a female householder and no spouse or partner present. About 34.2% of all households were made up of individuals and 13.4% had someone living alone who was 65 years of age or older.

There were 3,362 housing units, of which 5.7% were vacant. The homeowner vacancy rate was 1.2% and the rental vacancy rate was 3.4%.

Racial composition as of the 2020 census
| Race | Number | Percent |
|---|---|---|
| White | 6,584 | 88.6% |
| Black or African American | 121 | 1.6% |
| American Indian and Alaska Native | 21 | 0.3% |
| Asian | 76 | 1.0% |
| Native Hawaiian and Other Pacific Islander | 3 | 0.0% |
| Some other race | 43 | 0.6% |
| Two or more races | 579 | 7.8% |
| Hispanic or Latino (of any race) | 152 | 2.0% |

=== 2000 census ===
As of the census of 2000, there were 6,927 people, 2,876 households, and 1,760 families residing in the village. The population density was 3,763.5 inhabitants per square mile (1,453.1/km^{2}). There were 3,120 housing units at an average density of 1,695.1 units per square mile (654.5 units/km^{2}). The racial makeup of the village was 97.91% White, 0.45% African American, 0.22% Native American, 0.25% Asian, 0.00% Pacific Islander, 0.16% from other races, and 1.02% from two or more races. 0.68% of the population is Hispanic or Latino of any race.

There were 2,876 households, out of which 31.4% had children under the age of 18 living with them, 40.7% were married couples living together, 15.5% had a female householder with no husband present, and 38.8% were non-families. 32.0% of all households were made up of individuals, and 13.7% had someone living alone who was 65 years of age or older. The average household size was 2.37 and the average family size was 2.95.

In the village, the population was spread out, with 25.2% under the age of 18, 8.9% from 18 to 24, 30.6% from 25 to 44, 20.6% from 45 to 64, and 14.6% who were 65 years of age or older. The median age was 36 years. For every 100 females, there were 88.5 males. For every 100 females age 18 and over, there were 83.8 males.

The median income for a household in the village was $31,516, and the median income for a family was $37,628. Males had a median income of $31,107 versus $21,215 for females. The per capita income for the village was $17,575. 17.2% of the population and 12.8% of families were below the poverty line. 30.3% of those under the age of 18 and 6.3% of those 65 and older were living below the poverty line.

== Rail transportation ==
Amtrak, the national passenger rail system, provides service to Hudson Falls at the station in nearby Fort Edward, operating its Adirondack daily in both directions between Montreal and New York City, and its Ethan Allen Express in both directions daily between New York City and Rutland. Amtrak has designated the stop as Fort Edward-Glens Falls.

Freight rail service is provided along a spur line extending from Fort Edward to Glens Falls that runs through the village.

== Gallery ==
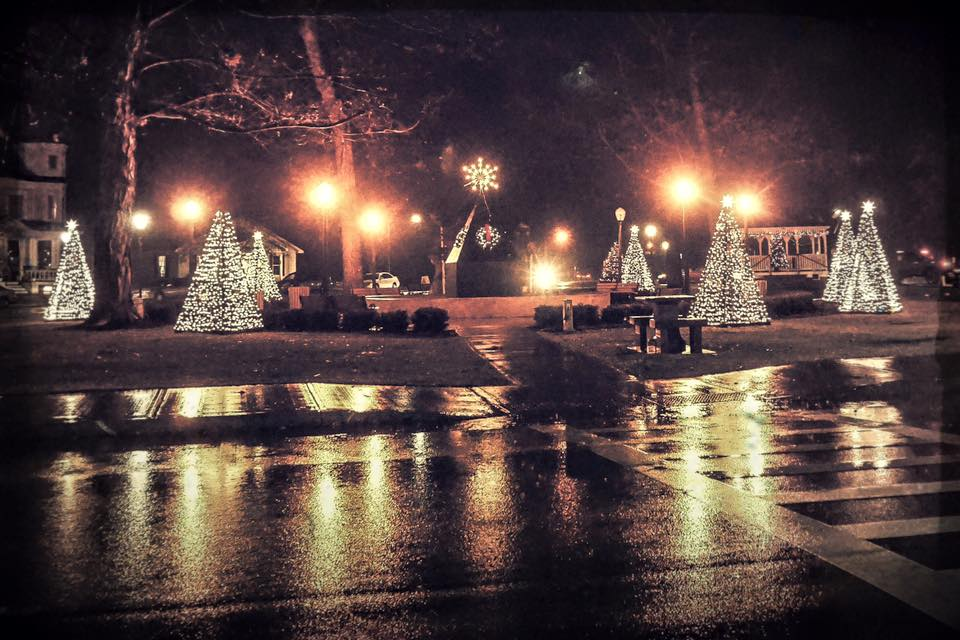
Juckett Park in December

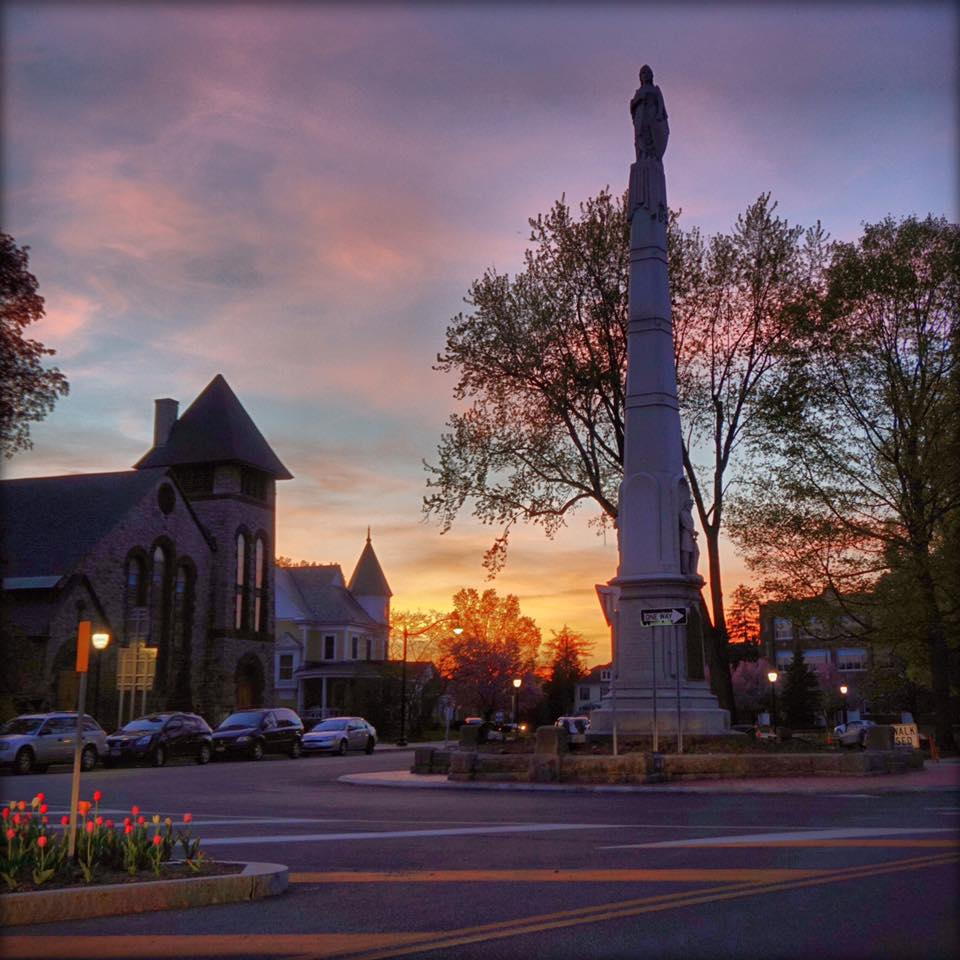
Monument in Hudson Falls, NY

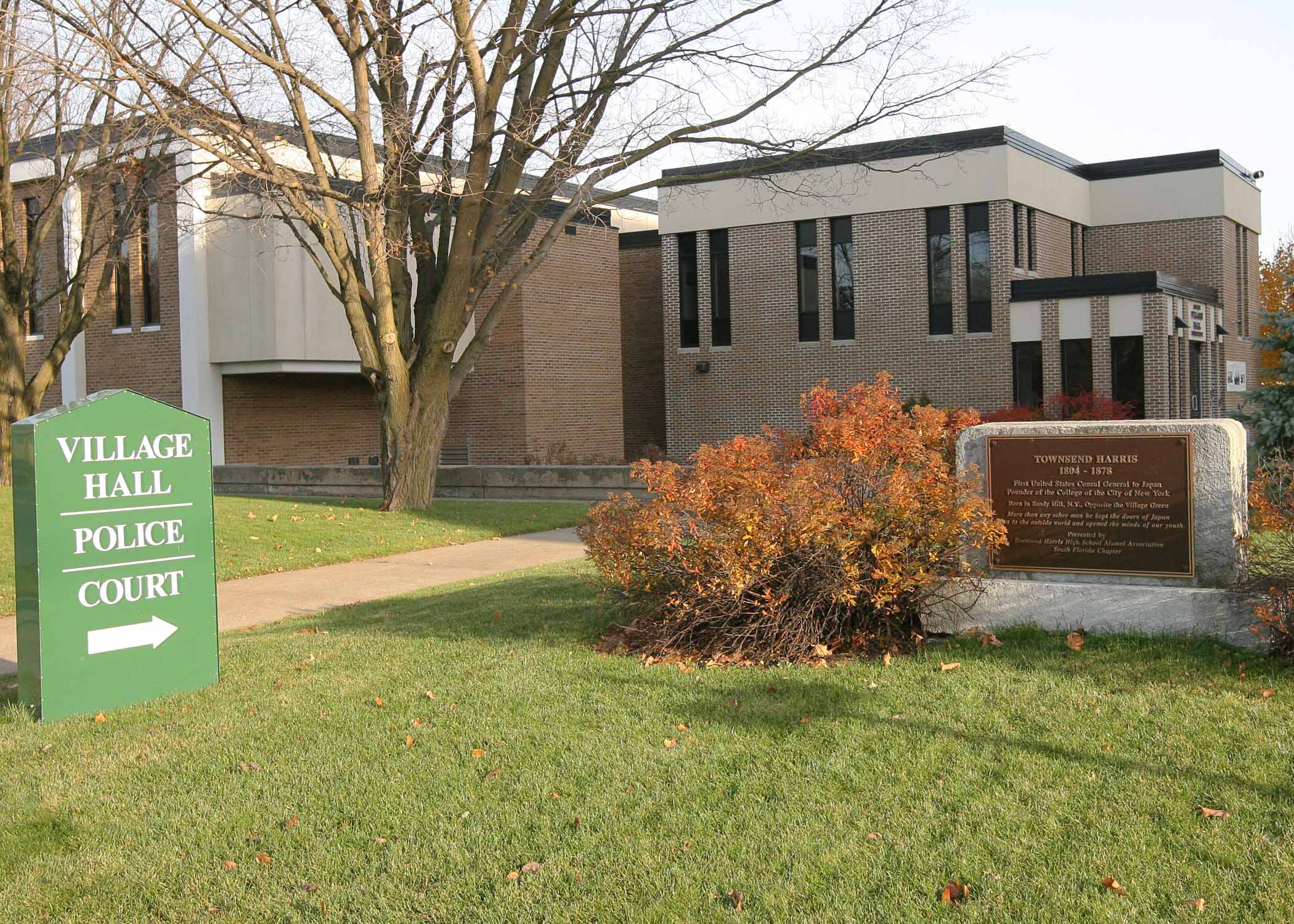
Courthouse Hudson Falls, NY

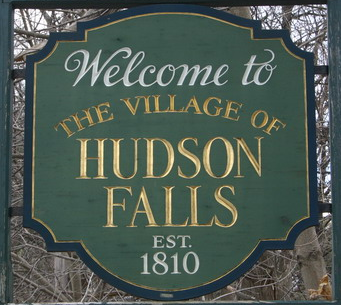
Welcome to Hudson Falls, NY

== Literary references ==
The fictional town of Millers Kill, NY, in Julia Spencer-Fleming's mystery novels is loosely based on Hudson Falls.
