= Schaghticoke (village), New York =

Schaghticoke, New York
- Village
- Location in Rensselaer County and the state of New York.

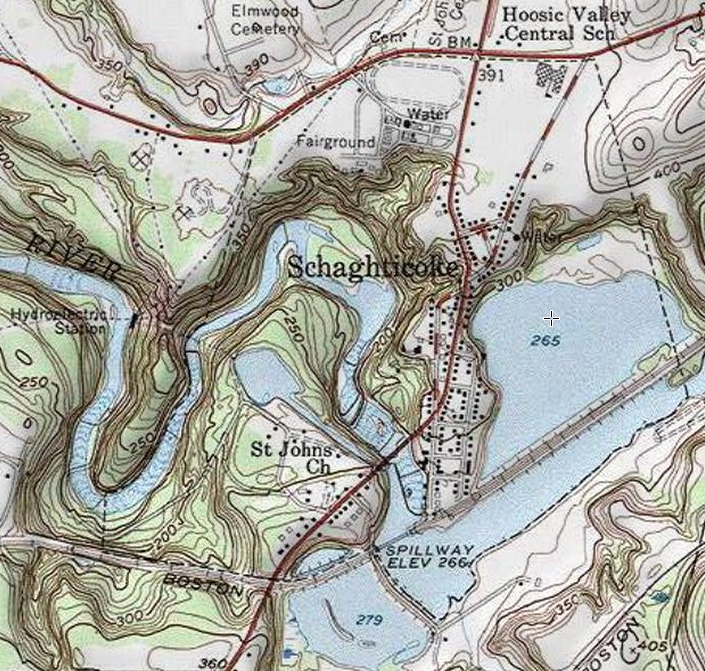
- USGS topographical map with the village

- Location within the state of New York
- Coordinates: 42°53′58″N 73°35′10″W
- Country: United States
- State: New York
- County: Rensselaer

Area
  - Total: 0.99 sq mi (2.57 km^{2})
  - Land: 0.76 sq mi (1.96 km^{2})
  - Water: 0.24 sq mi (0.61 km^{2})
- Elevation: 358 ft (109 m)

Population (2020)
  - Total: 527
  - Density: 695/sq mi (268.4/km^{2})
- Time zone: UTC-5 (Eastern (EST))
  - Summer (DST): UTC-4 (EDT)
- ZIP code: 12154
- Area code: 518
- FIPS code: 36-65475
- GNIS feature ID: 0964566

Schaghticoke is a village in Rensselaer County, New York, United States. The population was 592 at the 2010 census.

During the colonial period of 1640-1750, this area was occupied by a mixed group of Native Americans — Mohicans, who were local, and remnants of numerous New England tribes who had migrated west away from European encroachment and warfare.

The Village of Schaghticoke is in the Town of Schaghticoke, near the eastern town line. Schaghticoke is west of the Village of Valley Falls.

== History ==
In the colonial era, Native Americans at Schaghticoke included a mixed group of Mohicans, and members of several tribes from New England who had migrated away from Anglo-European settlement, including the Abenaki (inc. Sokoki and Pennacook), Cahoo, Wampanoag, Pocumtuc, Narraganset, Nipmuc and others. Their societies had been disrupted due to warfare with the English, such as King Philip's War.

This mixed group, which was at times 1000 men strong, were the dominant Native Americans of the area from circa 1640 -1750. While they paid tribute to the Iroquois to the west, they controlled their own territory here. By 1750, the majority of the land had been sold to European settlers. When the last of the Schaghticoke group moved north to escape European encroachment, the Iroquois laid claim to what was left. In 1769 settlers paid 5000 pieces of Spanish Gold for the area of the Kaydeross Patent.

The European Americans named the village "Harts Falls." It was incorporated under that name in 1867. It was reincorporated under the name of "Schaghticoke" in 1881.

== Geography ==
Schaghticoke is located at 42°53′58″N 73°35′10″W (42.899551, -73.586128).

Schaghticoke is next to the Hoosic River.

According to the United States Census Bureau, the village has a total area of 0.9 square mile (2.3 km^{2}), of which 0.7 square mile (1.9 km^{2}) is land and 0.2 square mile (0.4 km^{2}) (18.89%) is water.

== Demographics ==
Historical population
Census	Pop.	Note	%±
1890	1,258		—
1900	1,061		−15.7%
1910	765		−27.9%
1920	568		−25.8%
1930	555		−2.3%
1940	603		8.6%
1950	687		13.9%
1960	720		4.8%
1970	860		19.4%
1980	677		−21.3%
1990	794		17.3%
2000	676		−14.9%
2010	592		−12.4%
2020	527		−11.0%
U.S. Decennial Census

As of the census of 2000, there were 676 people, 270 households, and 181 families residing in the village. The population density was 916.3 inhabitants per square mile (353.8/km^{2}). There were 284 housing units at an average density of 385.0 per square mile (148.6/km^{2}). The racial makeup of the village was 96.30% White, 1.48% Black or African American, 0.59% Native American, 0.59% Asian, and 1.04% from two or more races. Hispanic or Latino of any race were 0.59% of the population.

There were 270 households, out of which 34.4% had children under the age of 18 living with them, 50.4% were married couples living together, 11.9% had a female householder with no husband present, and 32.6% were non-families. 25.9% of all households were made up of individuals, and 10.4% had someone living alone who was 65 years of age or older. The average household size was 2.50 and the average family size was 3.03.

In the village, the population was spread out, with 26.2% under the age of 18, 9.5% from 18 to 24, 32.0% from 25 to 44, 20.6% from 45 to 64, and 11.8% who were 65 years of age or older. The median age was 36 years. For every 100 females, there were 96.5 males. For every 100 females age 18 and over, there were 96.5 males.

The median income for a household in the village was $37,417, and the median income for a family was $44,432. Males had a median income of $36,510 versus $26,667 for females. The per capita income for the village was $17,734. About 7.4% of families and 8.3% of the population were below the poverty line, including 8.6% of those under age 18 and 12.5% of those age 65 or over.
