= Wynants Kill =

Location
- Country: United States
- State: New York

Physical characteristics
- Source: Glass Lake
  - location: Sand Lake, New York, Rensselaer County, New York, New York
  - coordinates: 42°37′46″N 73°31′58″W
- Mouth: Hudson River
  - location: Troy, New York
  - coordinates: 42°42′20″N 73°42′05″W
  - elevation: 20 ft (6.1 m)

The Wynants Kill is a 15.8-mile-long (25.4 km) stream which has its source at Glass Lake near Averill Park, New York, and terminates at the Hudson River at Troy, New York.

The stream is named after Wijnant Gerritsen van der Poel (1617–1699), a Dutch cabinet maker from Meppel who owned a sawmill on it in the 1650s, while kill is from an archaic Dutch word for "stream".

== The Wynantskill Association ==
The Wynantskill Association was formed by a group of the owners of mills along the Wynants Kill. It was founded in 1829 with a goal of managing water flow and the lakes which fed the stream. The name was changed to Wynantskill Improvement Association in 1848. A number of dams and improvement projects occurred over time, all with a goal of protecting the water supply for the mills. By the 1990s only one member of the WIA was left, the Portec Mill, and they weren't using the water any more. As a result, an effort was made to create new entities to own the lakes, allowing Portec to gracefully disentangle itself from unwanted real estate assets.

The Wynantskill Improvement Association owned the bottoms of Crooked Lake, Glass Lake, Crystal Lake, and Burden Lake until the 1990s, at which point they divested themselves of the lake property by selling to preservation corporations and improvement associations.

== Tributaries ==
In order from the origin of the Wynants Kill

- Crooked Lake
  - Origin of the Wynants Kill; the Wynants Kill runs from a dam at the north end of the lake a short distance to Glass Lake
  - The bottom of Crooked Lake has been owned by the Crooked Lake Improvement Association since September 5th, 2003.
- Glass Lake
  - Named for the Glass factory and associated Hamlet from the 1800s
  - The bottom of Glass Lake has been owned by the Glass Lake Preservation Corporation since March 29th, 1999.
- Horse Heaven Brook
  - Enters the Wynants Kill on the south side of the Hamlet of Sand Lake
- Crystal Lake
  - Originally named Sand Lake, renamed in the 1880s. Water flows a short distance from the dam on the south end to the Wynants Kill, in the Hamlet of Averill Park. The dam was built in 1829.
  - The bottom of Crystal Lake has been owned by the Crystal Lake Improvement Association since July 17th, 2002.
- Burden Lake
  - An artificial Lake, it connects to the Wynants Kill south of Averill Park. The section of Burden Lake south of Second Dyke Road was originally a natural lake named Martins Lake. In the 1850s, the mill owners of the Wynantskill Improvement Association built a dam, a canal, and a weir to divert water from the Wynants Kill to fill the valley, providing a reservoir for the downstream mills.
  - The bottom of Burden Lake has been owned by the Burdern Lake Preservation Corporation since May 15th, 2001.
- Raquet Lake (Drei Kante Lackie/Reichard's Pond)
  - This lake originally fed into the Wynants Kill north of the Hamlet of West Sand Lake. Today it drains into a gravel pit maintained by Troy Sand & Gravel, and may occasionally still contribute to the flow of the Wynants Kill.
- Snyder's Lake
  - Feeds into the Wynants Kill near Snyder's Corners

== See also ==
- List of rivers of New York
