= Edward W. Pattison =

American politician

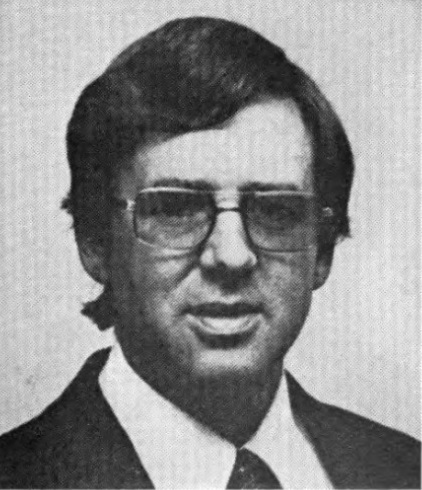
- From 1975's Pocket Congressional Directory of the Ninety-Fourth Congress

Member of the U.S. House of Representatives from New York's 29th district
- In office January 3, 1975 – January 3, 1979
- Preceded by: Carleton J. King
- Succeeded by: Gerald B. H. Solomon

Treasurer of Rensselaer County, New York
- In office January 1, 1970 – December 31, 1974
- Preceded by: James M. Brahan
- Succeeded by: None (position abolished)

Personal details
- Born: Edward Worthington Pattison; April 29, 1932 Troy, New York, U.S.
- Died: August 22, 1990 (aged 58) West Sand Lake, New York, U.S.
- Resting place: Oakwood Cemetery, Troy, New York
- Party: Democratic
- Spouse: Eleanor Copley Pattison (m. 1951–1990, his death)
- Children: 4
- Education: Cornell University (AB, LLB)
- Profession: Attorney
- Nickname: Ned

Military service
- Allegiance: United States
- Branch/service: United States Army
- Years of service: 1954–1956
- Rank: First Lieutenant
- Unit: Field Artillery Branch

Edward Worthington Pattison (April 29, 1932 – August 22, 1990) was an American attorney and politician from New York. A Democrat, he was most notable for his service as the last elected treasurer of Rensselaer County from 1970 to 1974 and a member of the United States House of Representatives from 1975 to 1979.

A native of Troy, New York, Pattison graduated from Cornell University in 1953 and served in the United States Army for two years. In 1957, he completed his law degree at Cornell Law School, attained admission to the bar, and began to practice in Troy.

Active in politics as a Democrat, Pattison was chairman of the Sand Lake, New York Democratic Committee and active in the presidential campaigns of John F. Kennedy in 1960 and Eugene McCarthy in 1968. In 1969, Pattison won election as treasurer of Rensselaer County, and he was reelected in 1972. In 1974, he was elected to the United States House of Representatives, and he was reelected in 1976. As one of the large freshman class of Democrats elected after the Watergate scandal, Pattison aided in reforming House rules to make seniority a less important factor in committee assignments and chairmanships.

After losing reelection in 1978, Pattison resumed practicing law, was a commentator on current events for television, radio, and newspapers, and also taught politics and government at several universities.

== Early life ==
Edward W. "Ned" Pattison was born in Troy, New York, on April 29, 1932, the son of Edward H. Pattison and Elisabeth (Royce) Pattison. He attended the public schools of Troy and the Hoosac School, and graduated from The Albany Academy in 1949. Pattison graduated from Cornell University with a Bachelor of Arts degree in 1953. While in college, he was a member of the Reserve Officers' Training Corps.

Pattison served in the United States Army from 1954 to 1956, and attained the rank of First Lieutenant as a member of the Field Artillery Branch. After his time on active duty, he completed his service obligation as a member of the United States Army Reserve. In 1957, Pattison received his LL.B. degree from Cornell Law School.

== Career ==
After graduating from law school, Pattison attained admission to the bar and practiced in Troy. During his legal career, Pattison became well known for his pro bono representation of poor and indigent clients. A Democrat, in 1960, was chairman of Rensselaer County Citizens for Kennedy-Johnson. A resident of West Sand Lake, in 1961 Pattison was elected chairman of the Sand Lake Democratic Committee. In 1963, he was the unsuccessful Democratic nominee for town supervisor of Sand Lake.

=== Early political involvement ===
Pattison opposed U.S. involvement in the Vietnam War, and in 1968 he supported Eugene McCarthy for president. Pattison was an unsuccessful candidate for delegate to that year's Democratic National Convention.

In 1969, Pattison was the successful Democratic candidate for Rensselaer County Treasurer. He was reelected in 1972, and served from 1970 until resigning in 1974. A charter change approved by the voters of Rensselaer County eliminated the treasurer's position in favor of a chief financial officer appointed by the county executive, but it provided that the incumbent treasurer could complete the term to which he had been elected in 1972.

Pattison was the unsuccessful nominee for the United States House of Representatives in 1970, losing to incumbent Carleton J. King. In 1973, he was the unsuccessful nominee for Rensselaer County Executive, a new position created by the county's charter change. He lost to Republican William J. Murphy, who served from 1974 until 1985.

=== Civic and professional memberships ===
Pattison was a member of the New York State Bar Association and Rensselaer County Bar Association, and served as president of the county association in 1974. He was also an officer, board member, or advisory board member of United Community Services, The Salvation Army, The Workshop, Inc. employment training service, West Sand Lake Volunteer Fire Company, West Sand Lake Parent-Teacher Association, Troy Kiwanis Club, Troy YMCA, Cornell University Alumni Association, Cornell Law School Alumni Association, Friends of Hoosac School, Rensselaer County Tuberculosis and Public Health Association, Commission on Economic Opportunity for the Rensselaer County Area, Family and Children's Services of Troy, March of Dimes Southern Adirondack Chapter, Home Aide Service of Eastern New York, Unity House of Troy, and Rensselaer Association for Retarded Children.

== U.S. Congressman ==
In 1974, Pattison was again a Democratic candidate for the U.S. House. In the November general election, he defeated Carleton King, a win which was attributed in large part to the Democratic wave that followed the involvement of President Richard Nixon, a Republican in the Watergate scandal. He was reelected in 1976, and served from January 3, 1975, to January 3, 1979.

As one of a larger than usual class of freshmen representatives (75), Pattison was a leader in pushing for reforms of House operations. The 1975 freshmen succeeded in making seniority less important with respect to committee assignments and leadership positions. As a result, they obtained better committee assignments for themselves than freshmen had previously received, and made committee chairmen more responsive to House members. Pattison served on the Judiciary Committee, where he played a key role in the reform of the national copyright law.

=== Defeat ===
By 1978, Pattison's district was again trending towards Republicans. Pattison's liberalism, coupled with issues including his admission of having previously used marijuana, enabled conservative Republican Gerald B. H. Solomon's victory in the general election.

== Later life ==
After leaving Congress, Pattison returned to practicing law. In addition, he was a political commentator for local newspapers, television and radio. In 1980, Pattison was the Democratic nominee for the New York State Senate in the 41st district, and lost to incumbent Republican Joseph Bruno.

Pattison was a fellow of the Institute of Politics at Harvard University's Kennedy School of Government. Beginning in 1979, he served as chairman of the Congressional Institute on the Future, an organization that worked on long-range solutions to emerging policy challenges. He also taught public affairs at Rensselaer Polytechnic Institute and Antioch University New England.

== Death and burial ==
Pattison died in West Sand Lake from complications related to liver cancer on August 22, 1990. He was buried in Troy's Oakwood Cemetery, Section D-2, Lot 40, Grave 12.

== Family ==
In 1951, Pattison married Eleanor Copley. They were the parents of four children — Mark, Lynn, Laura, and Wendy. Mark Pattison was elected mayor of Troy in 1995 and re-elected in 1999. He later served as a deputy with the New York State Comptroller, New York State Office of People with Developmental Disabilities, and Deputy Secretary of State of New York.

== Legacy ==
In 1990, Pattison received the New York State Bar Association's Root-Stimson Award in recognition of his many years of community service. The Rensselaer County government's office building in Troy, the Ned Pattison Government Center, is named in Pattison's honor. The New York Civil Liberties Union's Ned Pattison Award recognizes a public servant or private citizen who works to aid the poor and powerless, and is named for Pattison.

U.S. House of Representatives
Preceded by Carleton J. King	Member of the U.S. House of Representatives from New York's 29th congressional district 1975–1979	Succeeded by Gerald Solomon
