= Berlin Central School District =

School district in New York, United States

Location
- 17400 Route 22; Cherry Plain, New York, NY 12040 United States
- Coordinates: 42.638205°N 73.358073°W

District information
- Type: Public school district
- Grades: PK—12
- Superintendent: Dr. Maureen Long (Interim)
- Schools: Berlin Elementary School and Berlin Junior/Senior High School
- Budget: $18,265,000 (2008-2009)
- NCES District ID: 3604620.

Students and staff
- Students: 914 (2009-2010)
- Teachers: 81.46 (2009-2010) (on an FTE basis)
- Staff: 118.00 (2009-2010) (on an FTE basis)
- Student–teacher ratio: 11.22 (2009-2010)
- District mascot: Mountaineer

Other information
- Website: www.berlincentral.org

Berlin Central School District (BCSD) is a rural public school district located in the eastern part of Rensselaer County, New York and borders the Commonwealth of Massachusetts. The district has two operating school buildings: one elementary school and one middle school/high school building. The district is a member of the Rensselaer-Columbia-Greene Board of Cooperative Educational Services (BOCES), known as Questar III.

== Geography ==
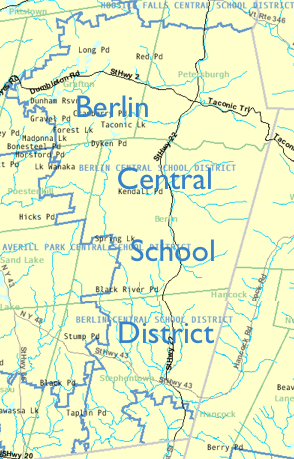
Map of Berlin CSD

The district serves five towns in Rensselaer County: Berlin, Grafton, Petersburgh, Poestenkill, and Stephentown.

== Administration ==
=== Board of education ===
The board of education (BOE) is the authoritative legislative body of the school district. It approves policy and funding; sets committees and district priorities; and approves employment (including the superintendent) within the district, among other things. The BOE is made up of seven members: Andrea Beckwith – 2022 – present – current term – 2022-2025 Kim Collen – 2022 – present – current term – 2022-2025 Derrick Gardner – 2020 – present – current term 2023-2026 Trevor Jewett – 2021 – present – current term 2021-2024 Sherry Bowman-Kluck – 2016 – present – current term 2022-2025 Katie Snyder – 2012 – present – current term 2021-2024 Frank J. Zwack – 1983 – 2001, 2002 – present – current term 2023-2026

=== Superintendent ===
The interim superintendent is Dr. Maureen Long. The superintendent is the chief administrative officer of the district and is responsible for the day-to-day operations of the district in addition to administering policies of the board.

== Schools ==
The district is currently served by one elementary school: Berlin Elementary School. Berlin Junior/Senior High School is the lone upper-level building. There are three principals in the district: one for the elementary, one for the middle school and one for the high school.

== See also ==
=== Education-related ===
- New York State Education Department
- University of the State of New York
- Regents Examinations
- Board of Cooperative Educational Services (BOCES)
- List of school districts in New York
- New York State School Boards Association
- National School Boards Association
- No Child Left Behind Act
