= Little Bowman Pond =

Glacial lake in New York, United States

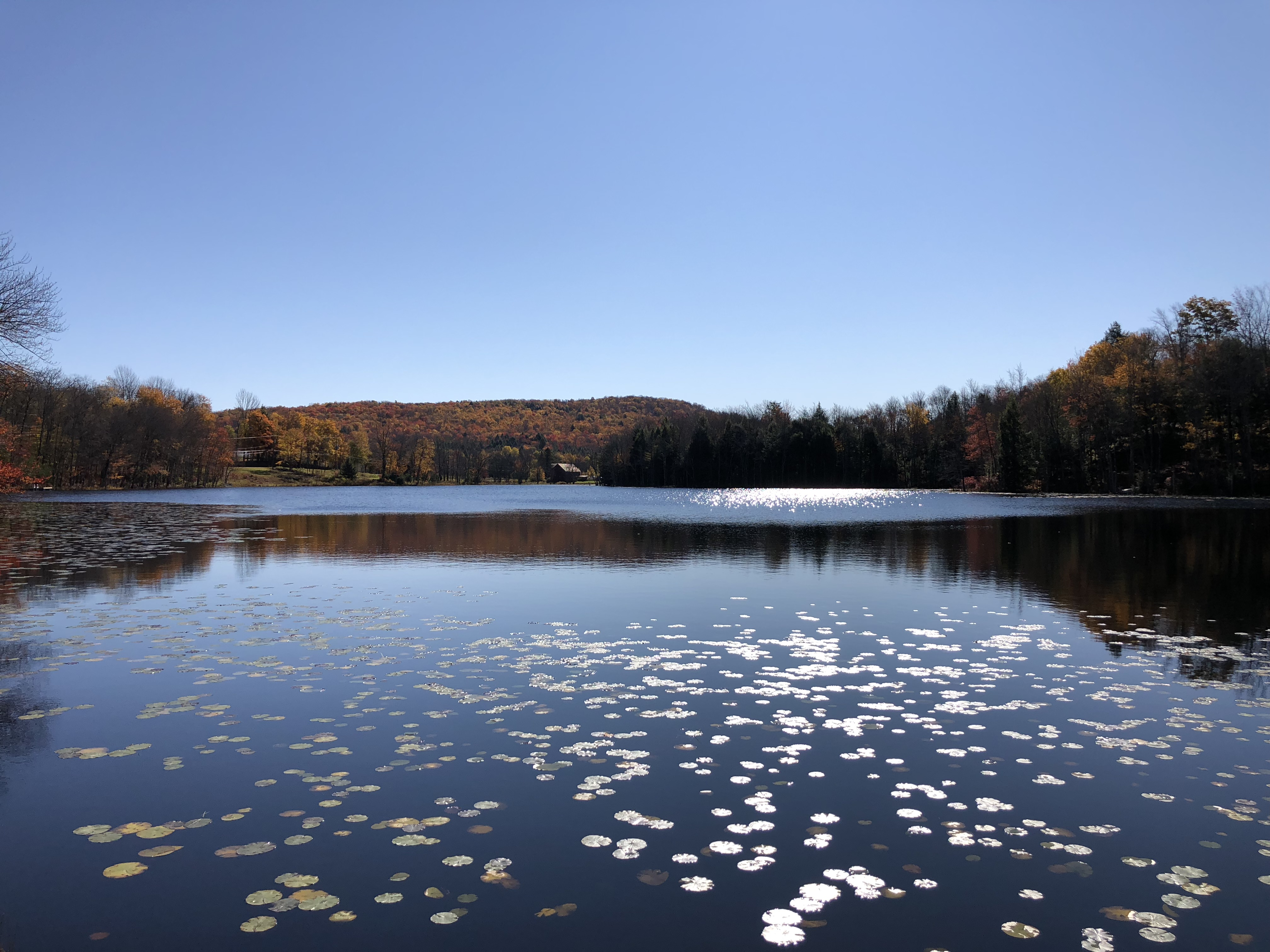

- Location in New York
- Location: Sand Lake, Rensselaer County, New York
- Coordinates: 42°38′41″N 73°28′59″W
- Type: Glacial tarn
- Basin countries: United States
- Surface elevation: 1,414 ft (431 m)

Little Bowman Pond is a small glacial lake in the Taborton section of the Town of Sand Lake, Rensselaer County, New York, United States. The lake is located on a geologic formation known as the Rensselaer Plateau. Its name is in relation to nearby Big Bowman Pond.
