= Big Bowman Pond =

Glacial lake in New York, United States

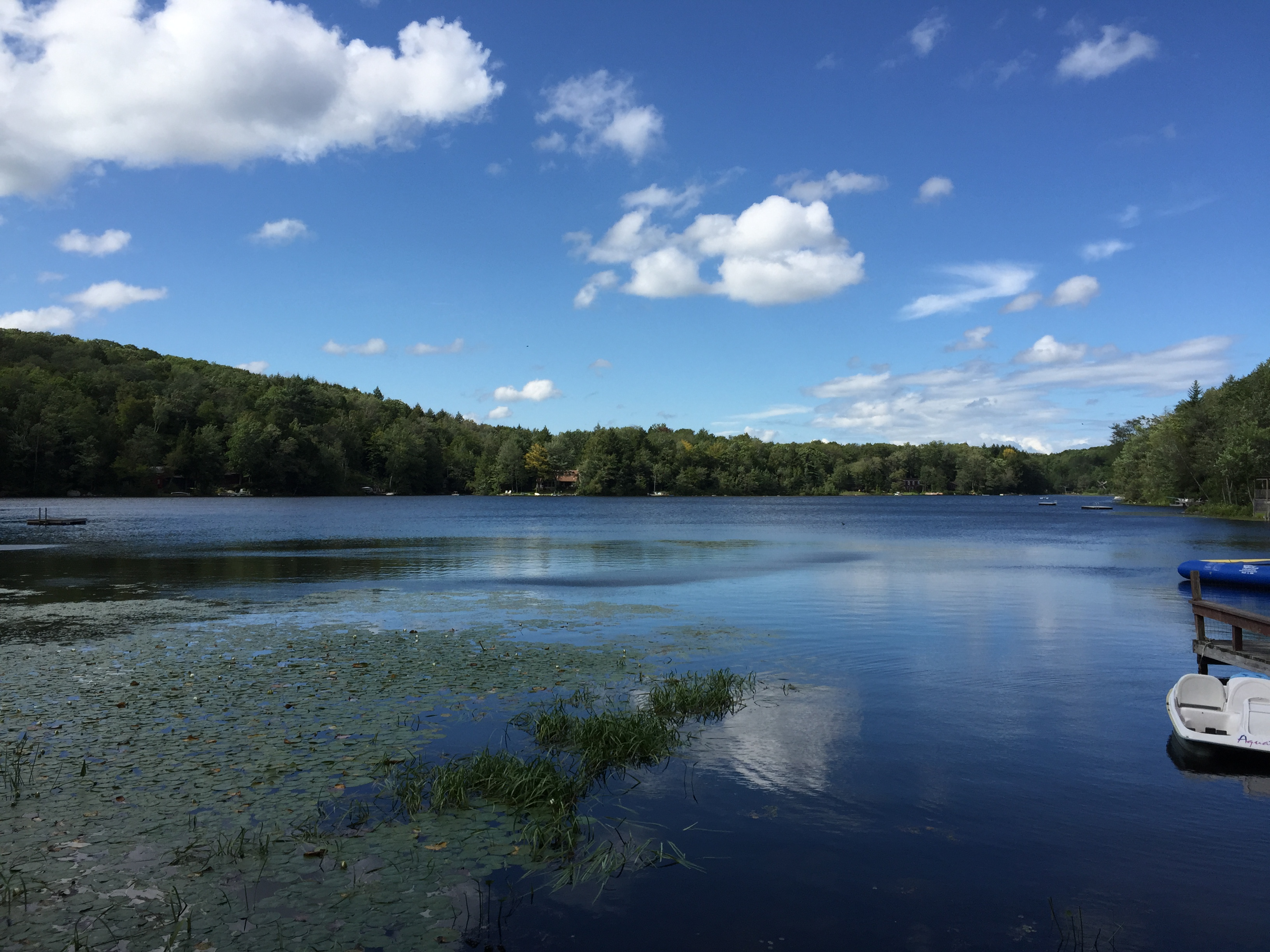

- Location in New York
- Location: Sand Lake, Rensselaer County, New York
- Coordinates: 42°38′54″N 73°29′17″W
- Type: Glacial tarn
- Surface elevation: 1,411 feet (430 m)

Big Bowman Pond is a small glacial lake in the Taborton section of the Town of Sand Lake, Rensselaer County, New York, United States. The lake is located on a geologic formation known as the Rensselaer Plateau. Its name is in relation to nearby Little Bowman Pond.

== Big Bowman ==
Big Bowman Pond is known to locals as the home of Big Bowman (also known as "Bowie"), a large, aquatic cryptid. Though its description varies from one account to the next, Big Bowman is generally described as being similar in appearance to the Bunyip, a mythical creature from Australian Aboriginal mythology. Rumors of the existence of Big Bowman began to circulate the greater Albany area in the late 1800s after a young boy went missing while swimming in the lake.
