= Sand Lake, New York (hamlet) =

Hamlet in Sand Lake, New York

Sand Lake, New York Sliter's Corners
- Hamlet
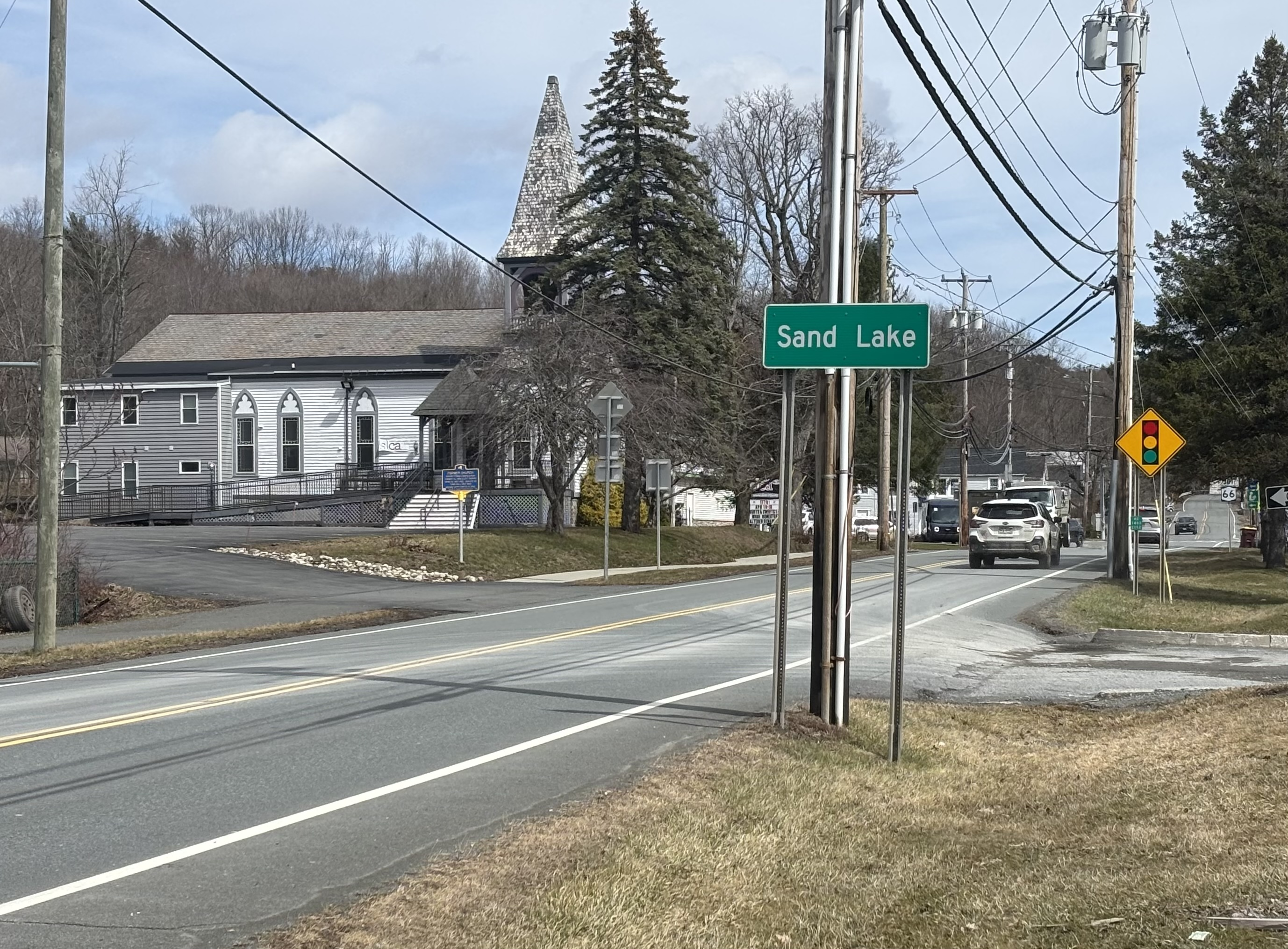
- View of Sand Lake hamlet sign from eastbound NY 43. Sand Lake Center For The Arts in background.

- Location of Sand Lake in New York
- Coordinates: 42°38′15″N 073°32′27″W
- Country: United States
- State: New York
- County: Rensselaer
- Town: Sand Lake
- Elevation: 781 ft (238 m)
- Time zone: UTC-5 (Eastern (EST))
  - Summer (DST): UTC-4 (EDT)
- Area code: 518
- GNIS feature ID: 964388

Sand Lake is a hamlet located within the town of Sand Lake in Rensselaer County, New York, United States. The hamlet is located at the northern junction of New York State Route 66 and New York State Route 43. It is served by the Averill Park & Sand Lake Fire Department.,

Town Offices, the Town Library, a New York State Police office, the Sand Lake Post Office, the Sand Lake Center For The Arts and the Miller Hill Elementary School are all located in the hamlet.

Horse Heaven Brook passes to the south of the hamlet.

== History ==
The hamlet was originally referred to as Sliter's Corners. When the original hamlet of Sand Lake renamed itself Averill Park, New York Sliter's Corners was renamed to the now available name of Sand Lake.

The Eastern Turnpike was built through the hamlet between 1801-1804. The section from Averill Park to the Massachusetts State Border (including this intersection) was declared public in 1824.

The Albert R. Fox House is located on New York Route 66 & New York Route 43 on the south side of the hamlet.

== Hazel Drew & Twin Peaks ==
The television series Twin Peaks was inspired by stories about the murder of Hazel Drew. Drew's body was found floating in Teal Pond, a short distance east of the hamlet in 1908.
