= Spring Lake (Rensselaer County, New York) =

Lake in Rensselaer County, New York, United States

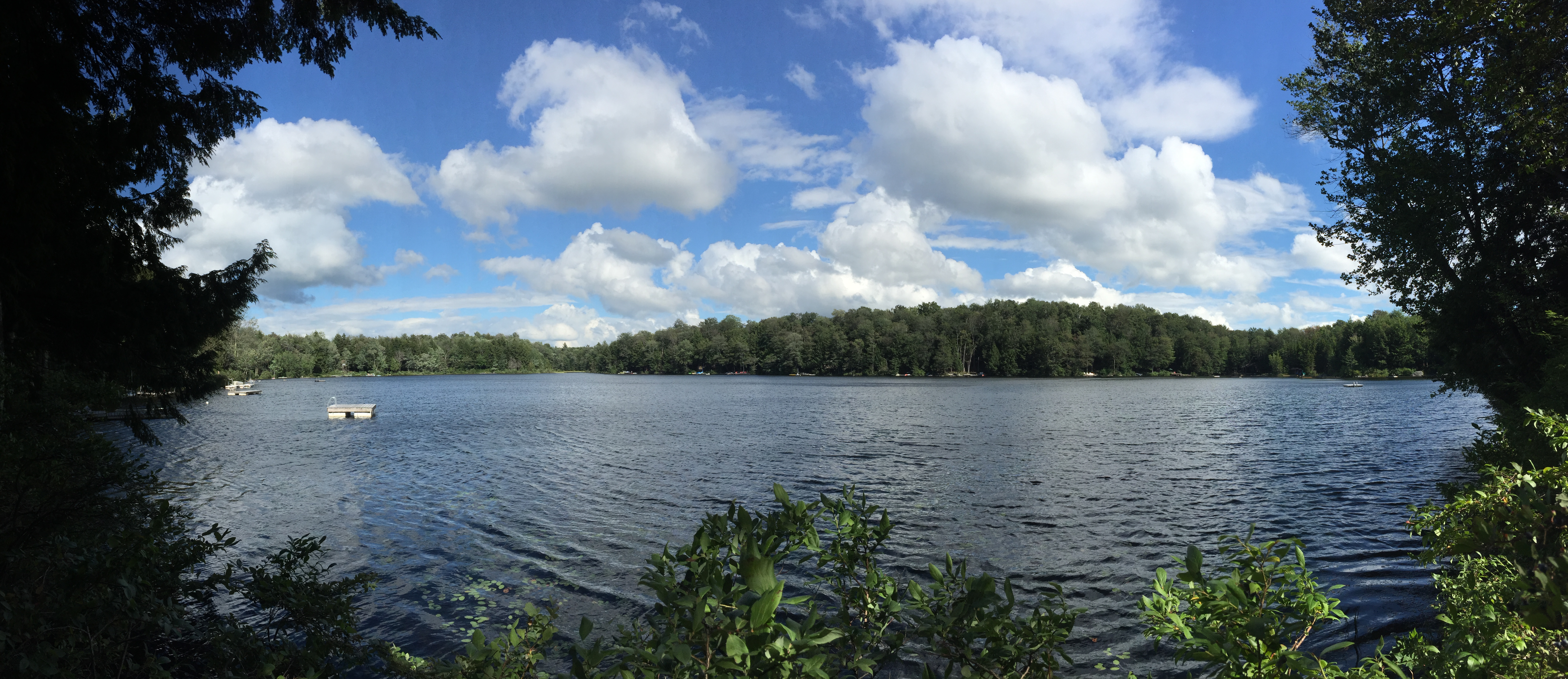

- Location in New York
- Location: Berlin, Rensselaer County, New York
- Coordinates: 42°39′12.29″N 73°25′16.4″W
- Type: Glacial tarn
- Basin countries: United States
- Surface area: 25.7 acres (10.4 ha)
- Average depth: 13 ft (4 m)
- Max. depth: 35 ft (10.7 m)
- Residence time: 1.7 years
- Surface elevation: 1,768 ft (539 m)

Spring Lake is a small glacial lake in the Town of Berlin, Rensselaer County, New York, United States. The lake is privately administered by the Spring Lake Association, which consists of the owners of cottages around the perimeter. There is no public access. The lake is located on a geologic formation known as the Rensselaer Plateau.
