= Levancia Holcomb Plumb =

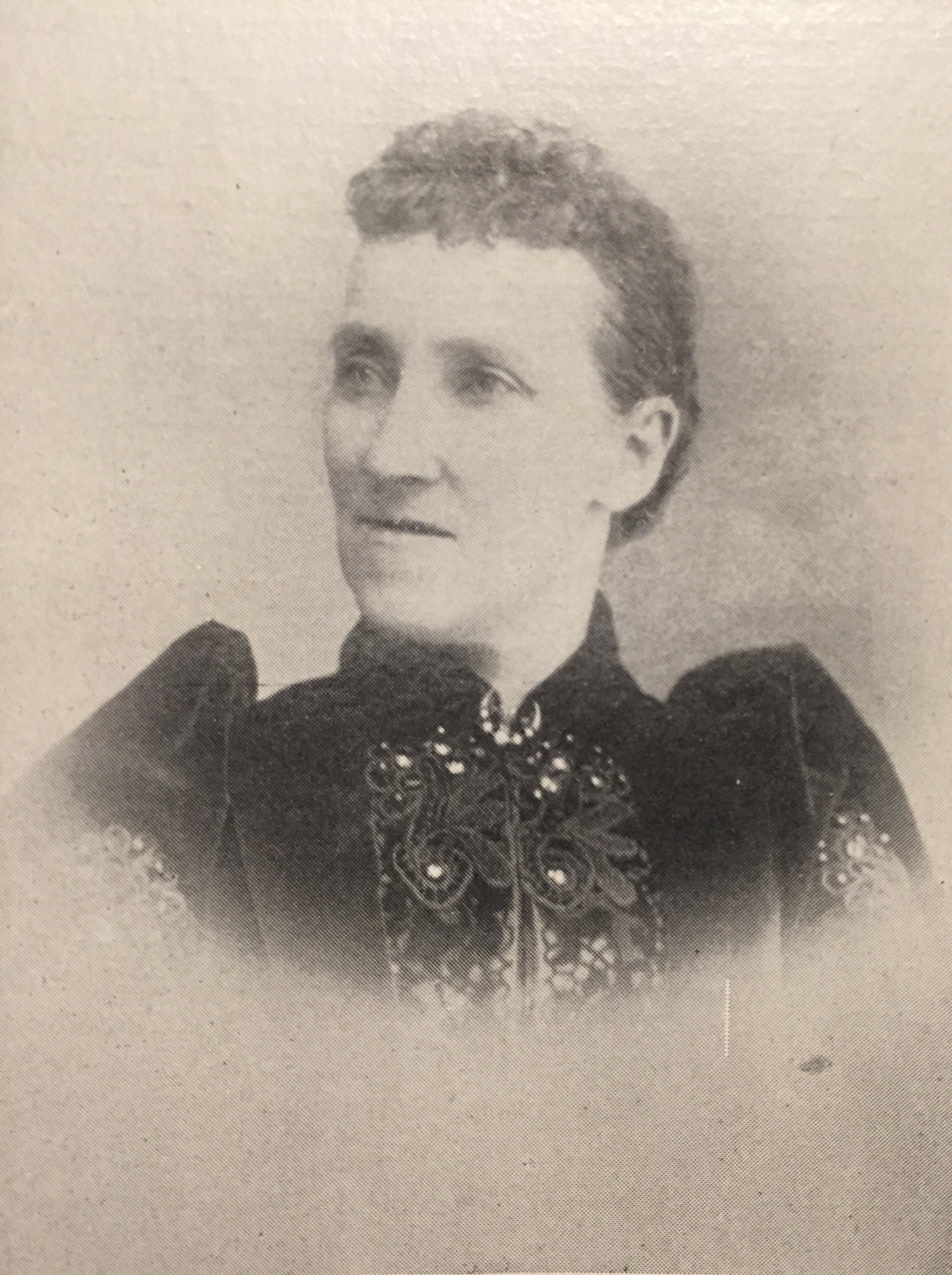
- Portrait photo from A Woman of the Century
- Born: Levancia Holcomb; June 23, 1841; Sand Lake, New York, U.S.
- Died: April 10, 1923 (aged 81); Streator, Illinois, U.S.
- Education: Oberlin College
- Occupations: business woman; financier; social reformer
- Organization: Woman's Temperance Publishing Association
- Known for: President and chief stockholder of the Union National Bank of Streator, Illinois
- Spouse: Samuel Plumb (m. 1868; died 1889)

Levancia Holcomb Plumb (1841–1923) was an American business woman, financier, and temperance reformer. She was the president and chief stockholder of the Union National Bank of Streator, Illinois. At the time, with one exception, she was the only woman head of a bank in the U.S.

== Early life and education ==
Levancia Holcomb was born on June 23, 1841, in Sand Lake, New York. Her parents were Hiram Holcomb and Cordelia Jane (née, Richards), who moved from New York to Ohio, and then came to Illinois when Levancia was 12 years old.

She graduated from Oberlin College with the class of 1861, and secured a master's degree four years later. While a student there, she formed the acquaintance of Samuel Plumb, a banker in Oberlin, Ohio.

== Career ==
In 1868, she married Samuel Plumb, and went with him to Streator, Illinois, in 1870. Their children were: May, Jessie, Samuel, and Bertha. Mr. Plumb founded the bank which later became the Union National Bank of Streator and served as its president until his death in 1889. In 1899, Mrs. Plumb was elected president of the bank, in recognition of both her husband's services and her own ability. She held the position until her death, serving a period of 24 years.

She lived in Illinois since 1870. Following her husband's death in 1882, she took charge of his estate. She was later elected vice-president of the Union National Bank of Streator, Illinois, where her husband had been president for several years.

A personal friend of Frances Willard, Plumb was one of the most active women in Woman's Christian Temperance Union (WCTU) work in Illinois. Plumb's work in that reform began in 1877. She was one of the charter members of the Woman's Temperance Publishing Association. She was one of the charter members and originators of the National Temperance Hospital in Chicago, Illinois.

Since 1890, while retaining her business interests in Streator, she made her home in Wheaton, Illinois, in order to superintend the education of her four children, who were attending school there.

== Death and legacy ==
She was a member of the Presbyterian church of Streator.

For more than 10 years, Plumb was an invalid and unable to walk most of that period. Levancia Plumb died at her home in Streator, Illinois, April 10, 1923, at the age of 81.

The Levancia H. Plumb Scholarship fund was maintained by Fisk University.
