= Cherry Plain, New York =

Cherry Plain, New York Cherryplain, South Berlin
- Hamlet
- Location of Cherry Plain in New York
- Coordinates: 42°37′45″N 073°21′29″W
- Country: United States
- State: New York
- County: Rensselaer
- Town: Berlin
- Elevation: 1,135 ft (346 m)
- Time zone: UTC-5 (Eastern (EST))
  - Summer (DST): UTC-4 (EDT)
- ZIP code: 12040
- Area code: 518
- GNIS feature ID: 979669

Cherry Plain, also spelled Cherryplain, is a hamlet in eastern Rensselaer County, New York, United States. It comprises the ZIP code of 12040.

It is located east of Troy, New York, in the town of Berlin, New York. Cherry Plain is located within the Berlin Central School District. Berlin Central Junior-Senior High School is the secondary school in Cherry Plain.

It is bisected by New York State Route 22.

== Important businesses and sights ==
- Cherry Plain State Park
