= Taborton, New York =

Taborton, New York Georgetown
- Hamlet
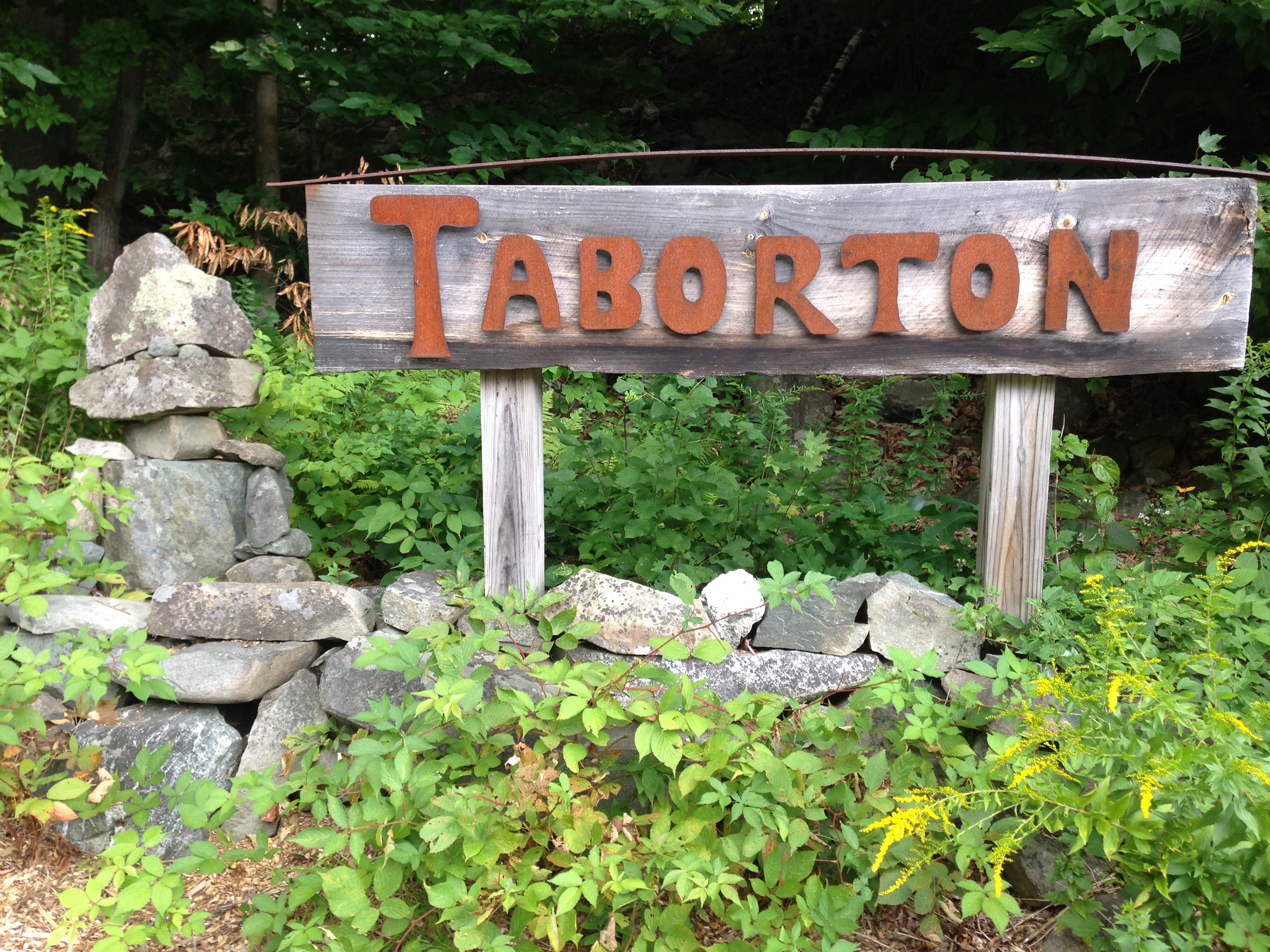

- Location of Taborton in New York
- Coordinates: 42°38′46″N 073°29′06″W
- Country: United States
- State: New York
- County: Rensselaer
- Town: Sand Lake
- Elevation: 1,427 ft (435 m)
- Time zone: UTC-5 (Eastern (EST))
  - Summer (DST): UTC-4 (EDT)
- Area code: 518
- GNIS feature ID: 966984

Taborton is a hamlet located within the town of Sand Lake in Rensselaer County, New York, United States. It is served by the Taborton Fire Department. Two small lakes, Big Bowman Pond and Little Bowman Pond, are in the immediate vicinity.
