= Round Pond (Berlin, New York) =

Glacial lake in New York, United States

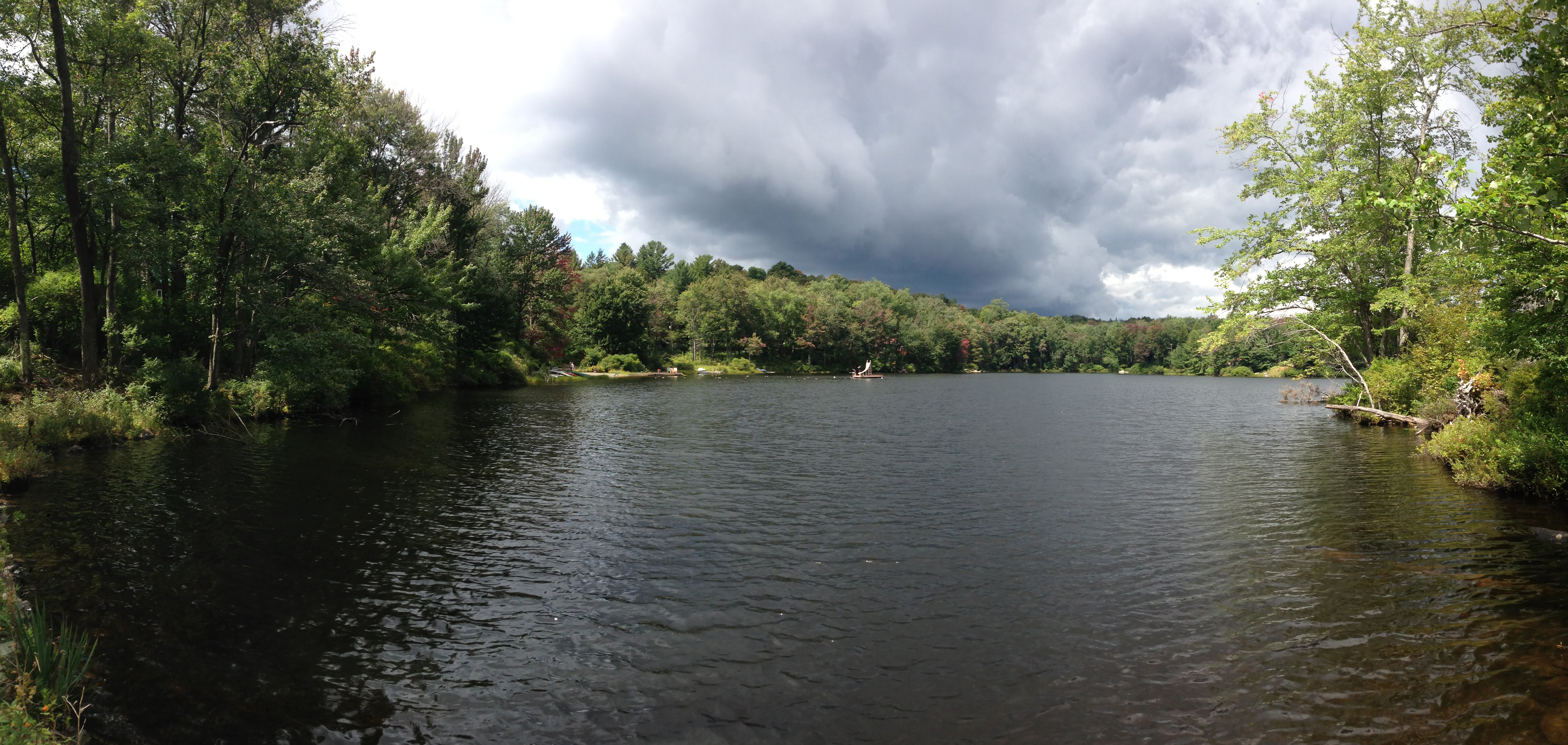

- Location in New York
- Location: Berlin, Rensselaer County, New York
- Coordinates: 42°38′34″N 73°26′06″W
- Type: Glacial tarn
- Basin countries: United States
- Surface elevation: 1,742 feet (531 m)

Round Pond is a small glacial lake in the Town of Berlin, Rensselaer County, New York, United States. The lake is located on a geologic formation known as the Rensselaer Plateau.
