= Troy and New England Railway =

- Industry: Public and freight transportation
- Founded: 1895
- Fate: Defunct
- Key people: James K. Averill

The Troy and New England Railway Company was an electric trolley that operated between Averill Park and Albia (in Troy, New York). Riders could pick up the trolley from Troy's city trolley. It operated around 1895 to 1925. James K. Averill had this line established, with the intention to extending the route to Pittsfield, Massachusetts.

Its route essentially paralleled the Wynantskill Creek and then West Sand Lake Road from Albia to Sand Lake. There were stops at several places, including Brookside Avenue, Sand Lake Road at Steamview Lane, and at Sagendorf Lane.

The trolley cars were open sided in the summer and windowed side cars were used during the winter months. Flatcars and box cars were used to transport freight. The cars were powered by an overhead wire that connected to electric motors within the trolley. Trolleys ran from 5:30 in the morning until midnight. Children took the trolley to get to school. It is likely that the trolley stopped offering service when automobiles became the common method for transportation.

Starting in 1902, the trolley ran on coal-fired steam electricity generated at a local power plant. Troy and New England Railway was purchased by United Traction Company in 1910. By 1916, Delaware and Hudson Company had a controlling interest in United Traction Company and the Troy and New England Railway.

== See also ==
- List of New York railroads
