= Sand Lake Baptist Church =

Historic church in New York, United States

- U.S. National Register of Historic Places
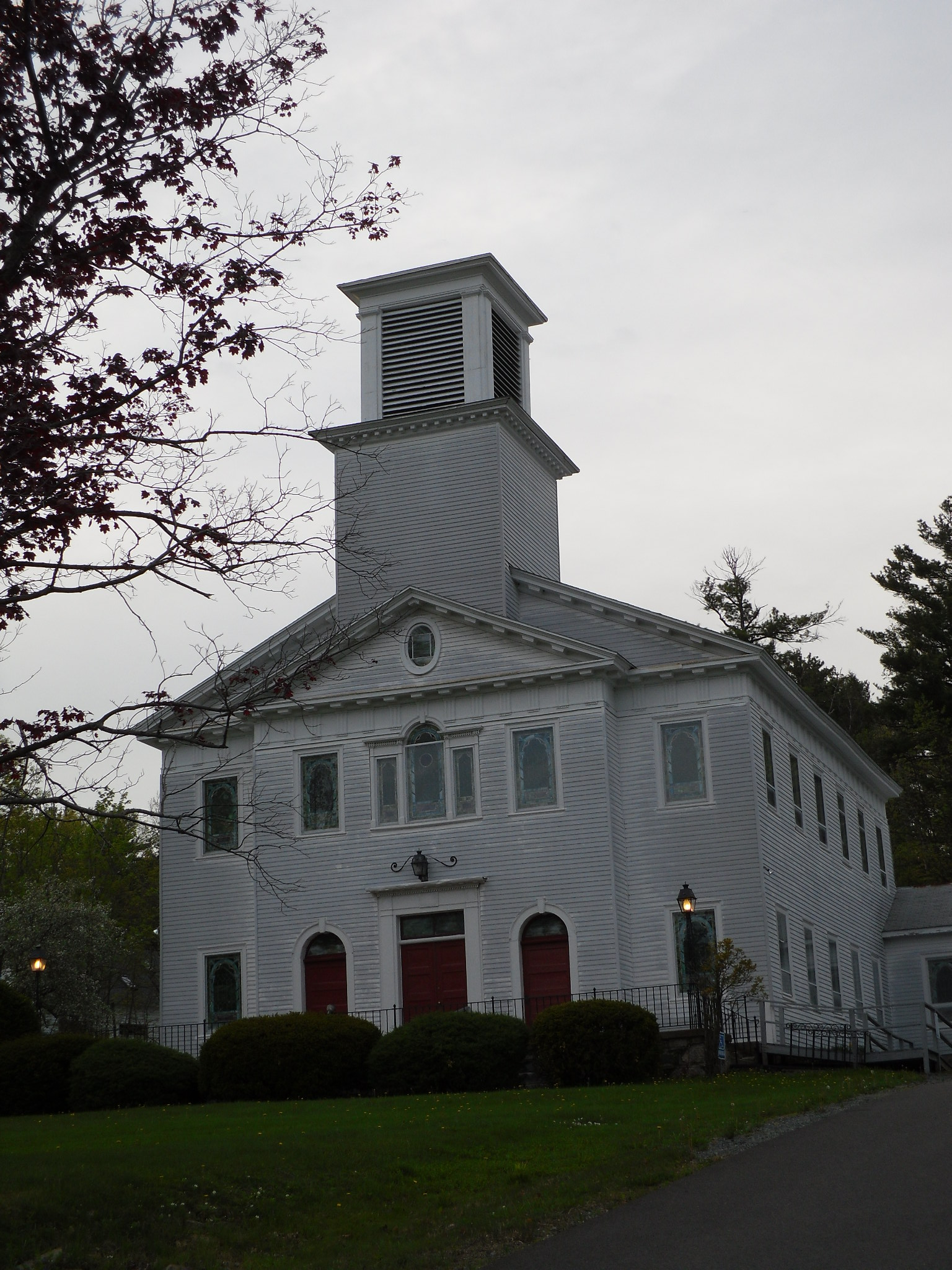
- Sand Lake Baptist Church, May 2010

- Location within New York Location within the United States
- Location: 2960 NY 43, Averill Park, New York
- Coordinates: 42°38′7″N 73°32′59″W
- Area: 8.2 acres (3.3 ha)
- Built: 1805
- Architectural style: Federal
- NRHP reference No.: 03001353
- Added to NRHP: January 2, 2004

Sand Lake Baptist Church is a historic Baptist church at 2960 State Route 43 in Averill Park, Rensselaer County, New York. The church was built in 1805 and is a Federal period frame building. It is a rectangular, two-story, heavy wood-frame building set on a stone foundation. The church has a gable roof and features a two-stage, semi-engaged Greek Revival style tower added in 1840. The front facade features a Palladian window. Also on the property is a contributing parsonage (1846) and garage (1939).

The church was listed on the National Register of Historic Places in 2004.
