= Rensselaer Plateau =

Geological feature in New York State, US

Coordinates: 42.70°N 73.42°W

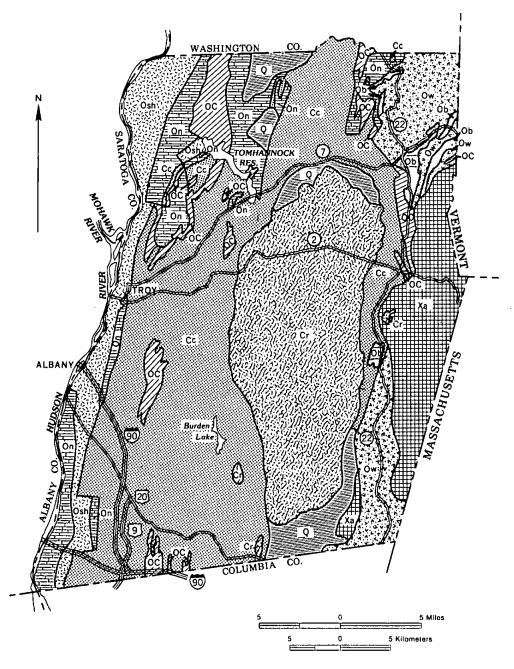
Bedrock geology of Rensselaer County, with the Plateau center, indicated by the oblong mottled area marked Cr. Legend here.

The Rensselaer Plateau is a small plateau located in the central portion of Rensselaer County, New York; it generally encompasses significant parts of the towns of Berlin, Stephentown, Sand Lake, Poestenkill, and Grafton, along with small sections of several other nearby towns. Many glacial lakes, including Big Bowman Pond, Little Bowman Pond, Round Pond and Spring Lake are located on the plateau. Elevations on the plateau range from 1,000 to 2,000 feet (305 to 610 meters) above sea level. Vegetation on the plateau is more similar to that found in the Adirondack Mountains to the northwest, with abundant Eastern White Pine, Eastern Hemlock, Red Spruce, and balsam fir, along with more limited occurrences of Red Pine and Tamarack. While most to all of the plateau was logged late in the 19th century and early in the 20th century, little farming was undertaken afterwards due to extremely poor and rocky soils, allowing much of the forest to regenerate.

Cowee State Forest was established across 3,700 acres (15 km^{2}) in the central portion of the plateau in 2024.
