= Cherry Plain State Park =

State park in Rensselaer County, New York

- Location within New York
- Interactive map of Cherry Plain State Park
- Type: State park
- Location: 10 State Park Road; Berlin, New York
- Nearest city: Hoosick Falls, New York
- Coordinates: 42°37′08″N 73°24′43″W
- Area: 175 acres (0.71 km^{2})
- Operator: New York State Office of Parks, Recreation and Historic Preservation
- Visitors: 23,250 (in 2014)
- Open: All year
- Camp sites: 30
- Website: Cherry Plain State Park

Cherry Plain State Park is a 175-acre (0.71 km^{2}) state park located in Rensselaer County, New York in the United States. The park is located in Cherry Plain at the southwest part of the Town of Berlin, near the Massachusetts border. Outdoor recreational opportunities are also available within the Capital District Wildlife Management Area, a 4,153-acre (16.81 km^{2}) conservation area that nearly surrounds the park.

== Park description ==
Cherry Plain State Park offers a beach, picnic tables with pavilions, a playground, recreation programs, a nature trail, hiking and biking, cross-country skiing, fishing (bass, bullheads and pickerel), ice fishing, and a boat launch with boat rentals. Thirty campsites are available at the park, including ten trailer sites, ten tent sites near Black River Pond, and ten sites that can be reached only by hiking.

Cherry Plain State Park is nearly completely surrounded by the 4,153-acre (16.81 km^{2}) Capital District Wildlife Management Area, managed by the New York State Department of Environmental Conservation. The minimally improved WMA offers opportunities for hiking and cross-country skiing on nine miles (14 km) of hiking trails and seven miles (11 km) of truck trails, in addition to space for horseback riding, hunting, and trapping. In addition to wildlife typical of wooded areas, such as white-tailed deer, beaver, and wild turkey, the Capital District Wildlife Management Area also hosts moose, which have recently arrived in the region from neighboring states.

== See also ==
- List of New York state parks
