= Carleton J. King =

American politician (1904–1977)

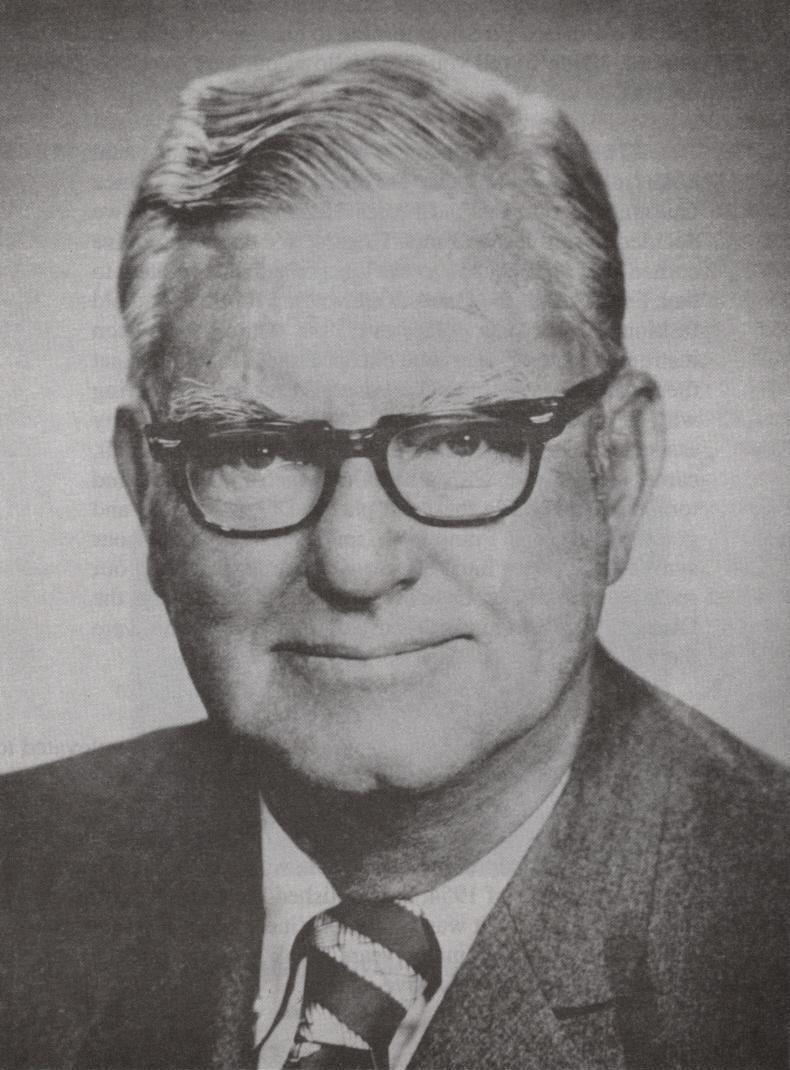

Member of the United States House of Representatives from New York
- In office January 3, 1961 – December 31, 1974
- Preceded by: Dean P. Taylor
- Succeeded by: Edward W. Pattison
- Constituency: 31st district (1961–63); 30th district (1963–73); 29th district (1973–74)

District Attorney of Saratoga County, New York
- In office January 1, 1950 – December 31, 1960
- Preceded by: John P. Doyle
- Succeeded by: James A. O'Connor

Personal details
- Born: June 15, 1904 Saratoga Springs, New York, US
- Died: November 19, 1977 (aged 73) Bradenton, Florida, US
- Party: Republican
- Spouse: Constance M. Roddy (m. 1933)
- Children: 2
- Education: Albany Law School
- Profession: Attorney

Carleton James King (June 15, 1904 – November 19, 1977) was an attorney and politician from Saratoga Springs, New York. A Republican, he was most notable for his service as District Attorney of Saratoga County, New York from 1950 to 1960, and a member of the United States House of Representatives from 1961 to 1974.

A native of Saratoga Springs, King graduated from Albany Law School in 1926, was admitted to the bar, and practiced in Saratoga Springs. He became active in politics and government as a Republican, and served as acting city court judge of Saratoga Springs from 1936 to 1941. In 1936, he was an unsuccessful candidate for Congress. In 1942, King was appointed Deputy District Attorney of Saratoga County, and he served until 1950. In 1950, King won election as district attorney, and he served until resigning at the end of 1960 to assume his seat in the Congress.

In 1960, King won election to the U.S. House. He was reelected six times and served from January 1961 until resigning in December 1974. He was an unsuccessful candidate for reelection in 1974, and resigned a few days before the end of his final term.

In retirement, King resided in Florida. He died in Bradenton, Florida on November 19, 1977. His remains were cremated and scattered in the Gulf of Mexico.

== Early life ==
King was born in Saratoga Springs, New York on June 15, 1904, the son of James Henry King and Anna Louise (Rose) King. He graduated from Albany Law School in 1926. He was a member of the Phi Sigma Kappa fraternity, and at graduation received the Corporation Prize, which was awarded to the student with the highest class standing in corporation law.

== Career ==
After attaining admission to the bar in 1926, King practiced law in Saratoga Springs. In 1936, he was a candidate for Congress, but lost the Republican nomination to E. Harold Cluett. From 1936 to 1941, he was acting judge of the Saratoga Springs municipal court.

King was an assistant district attorney of Saratoga County, New York from 1942 until 1950. In 1950, he was elected district attorney, and he served until resigning at the end of 1960 so he could begin the Congressional term to which he had been elected earlier that year. In 1955, King served as president of the New York State District Attorneys Association.

In November 1957, leaders of organized crime in New York held a planning conference now known as the Apalachin meeting, which was interrupted by police. In response, Governor Averell Harriman appointed five District Attorneys, including King, to advise him on new legislation. In February 1958, the district attorneys recommended creation of a special rackets bureau within the New York State Police.

== U.S. Congressman ==
He was elected to Congress in 1960, and was reelected six times. He served from January 3, 1961, until his resignation on December 31, 1974. He unsuccessfully ran for re-election in 1974, and lost to Democratic nominee Edward W. Pattison, a victory attributed to the wave election that favored Democrats as voters responded to Republican involvement in the Watergate scandal.

King was recognized as a member of the Republican Party's conservative wing. In 1962, he proposed an across-the-board income tax of at least 25 percent. In addition, King argued that individual and corporate tax rates should not be higher than 47 percent. During his Congressional service, King served on the United States Naval Academy board of visitors.

== Later life ==
In 1975, King was appointed to the board of visitors of the United States Military Academy. In retirement, he resided in Florida. He died in Bradenton, Florida on November 19, 1977. King was cremated and his ashes were scattered in the Gulf of Mexico near Bradenton.

== Family ==
In 1933, King married Constance M. Roddy of Brooklyn. They were the parents of two children, son Carleton J. King Jr. and daughter Constance King, the wife of James A. Murphy Jr.

U.S. House of Representatives
Preceded by Dean P. Taylor	Member of the U.S. House of Representatives from New York's 31st congressional district 1961–1963	Succeeded by Clarence E. Kilburn
Preceded by Leo W. O'Brien	Member of the U.S. House of Representatives from New York's 30th congressional district 1963–1973	Succeeded by Robert C. McEwen
Preceded by Samuel S. Stratton	Member of the U.S. House of Representatives from New York's 29th congressional district 1973–1974	Succeeded by Edward W. Pattison
