= Albert R. Fox House =

Historic house in New York, United States

- U.S. National Register of Historic Places
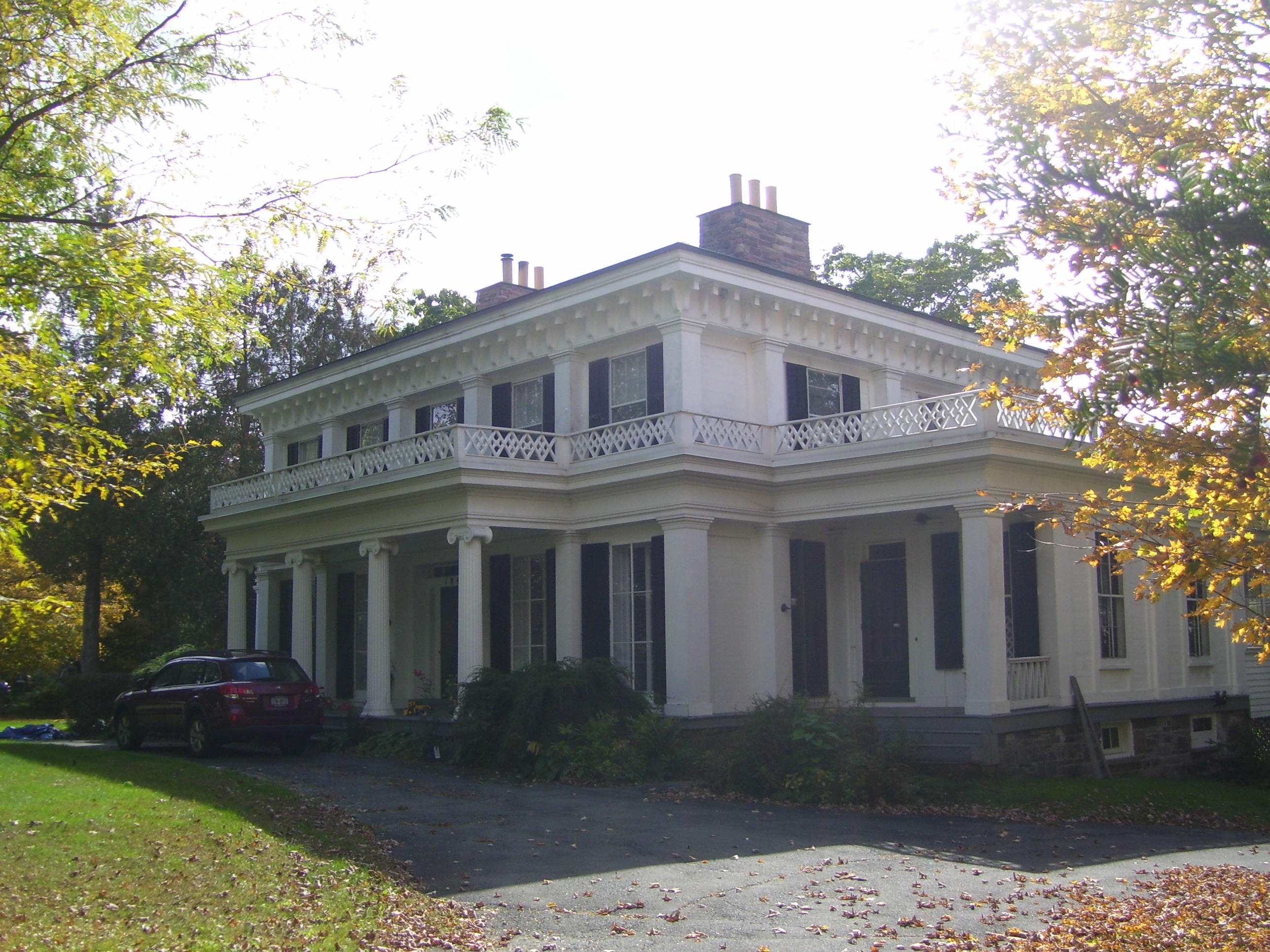

- Location within New York Location within the United States
- Location: 2801 NY 66, Sand Lake, New York
- Coordinates: 42°38′4″N 73°32′18″W
- Area: 2.5 acres (1.0 ha)
- Built: 1847
- Architectural style: Greek Revival
- NRHP reference No.: 01000430
- Added to NRHP: April 25, 2001

Albert R. Fox House, also known as the Fox Mansion, is a historic home located at Sand Lake in Rensselaer County, New York. It was built about 1847 and is a large Greek Revival style frame dwelling. It consists of a two-story, five-bay-wide and four-bay-deep main block, flanked by one-story, two-bay-wide wings. There is also a large two-story rear wing. It features a full-width, one-story open porch with Ionic order columns supporting a deep entablature. Also on the property are a contributing fountain (c. 1860) and two small 19th-century sheds.

It was listed on the National Register of Historic Places in 2001.
