= West Sand Lake, New York =

- Hamlet and CDP
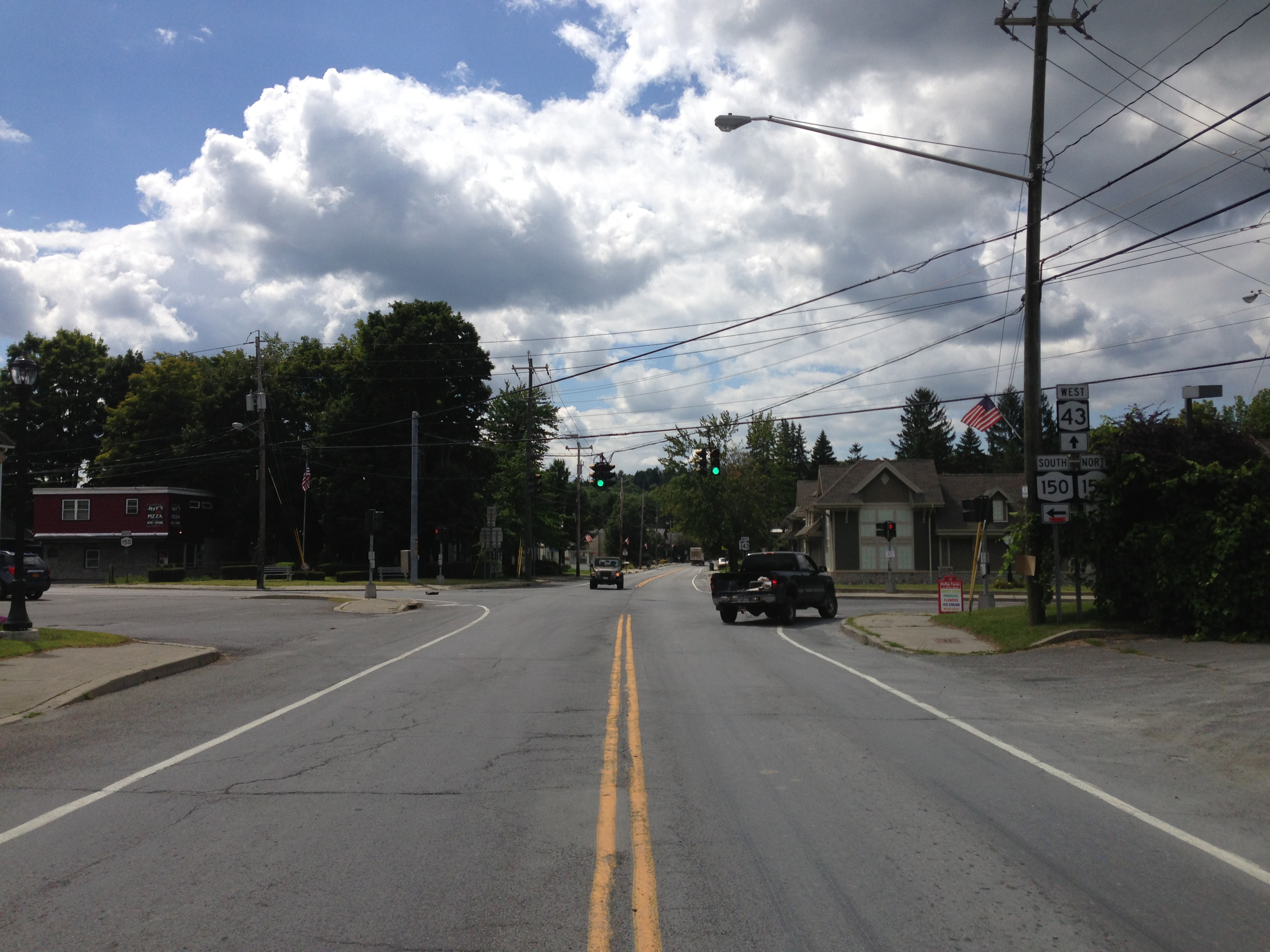
- Intersection of NY 43 and NY 150 in West Sand Lake
- Nickname: Old Best
- Location in Rensselaer County and the state of New York.

- Location within the state of New York
- Coordinates: 42°38′40″N 73°36′21″W
- Country: United States
- State: New York
- County: Rensselaer
- Town: Sand Lake

Government
  - Type: Town Board and Council
  - Town Supervisor: Flora Fasoldt (D)

Area
  - Total: 4.86 sq mi (12.58 km^{2})
  - Land: 4.77 sq mi (12.35 km^{2})
  - Water: 0.089 sq mi (0.23 km^{2})
- Elevation: 520 ft (160 m)

Population (2020)
  - Total: 2,616
  - Density: 548.6/sq mi (211.81/km^{2})
- Time zone: UTC-5 (Eastern (EST))
  - Summer (DST): UTC-4 (EDT)
- ZIP code: 12196
- Area code: 518
- FIPS code: 36-80863
- GNIS feature ID: 0970858
- Website: www.TownofSandLake.us

West Sand Lake is a hamlet and census-designated place within the town of Sand Lake in Rensselaer County, New York, United States. The population was 2,616 people in 2020. The community is located in the northwestern corner of the town of Sand Lake.

== Geography ==
West Sand Lake is located at 42°38′40″N 73°36′21″W (42.644579, -73.605928).

According to the United States Census Bureau, the town has a total area of 4.8 square miles (12 km^{2}), of which 4.7 square miles (12 km^{2}) is land and 0.04 square miles (0.10 km^{2}) (0.84%) is water.

== Demographics ==
Historical population
Census	Pop.	Note	%±
2020	2,616		—
U.S. Decennial Census

As of 2015, there were 2,845 people living in the town. The population density was 592.71 per square mile. The racial makeup of West Sand Lake was 95.8% Non Hispanic White, 0.2% African American, 0.08% Native American, .6 % Asian, and 1.5% from two or more races. Hispanic or Latino were 1.7% of the population. There were 907 households, out of which 38.0% had children under the age of 18 living with them, 63.2% were married couples living together, 9.2% had a female householder with no husband present, and 24.4% were non-families. 20.2% of all households were made up of individuals, and 9.7% had someone living alone who was 65 years of age or older. The average household size was 2.68 and the average family size was 3.09.

In the CDP, the population was spread out, with 26.8% under the age of 18, 5.9% from 18 to 24, 27.3% from 25 to 44, 28.7% from 45 to 64, and 11.3% who were 65 years of age or older. The median age was 39 years. For every 100 females, there were 93.7 males. For every 100 females age 18 and over, there were 91.9 males.

The median income for a household in West Sand Lake was $85,000, and the median income for a family was $92,367. The per capita income for the town was $36,235 About 5.0% of families and 7.8 of the population were below the poverty line, including 7.4% of those under age 18 and 19.1% of those age 65 or over.

The area has a population density of 592.71 people per sq. mile.

== History ==
The hamlet was originally named Ulinesville or Uline's Corners, after Bernhard Uhlein, who leased a 325 acre farm in the Manor of Rensselaerswyck in 1793. The hamlet was renamed West Sand Lake in 1838. Uline also operated the first tavern in the hamlet

The Troy and New England Railway had trolly stops in West Sand Lake.

== Notable people ==
- Douglas Marland, writer
- Edward W. Pattison, member of the United States House of Representatives 1975–1979
- Raymond F. Shields Jr., Adjutant General of New York
- Burton A. Thomas, engineer and surveyor, laid out Albany Rural Cemetery
