= Berlin, New York =

- Town
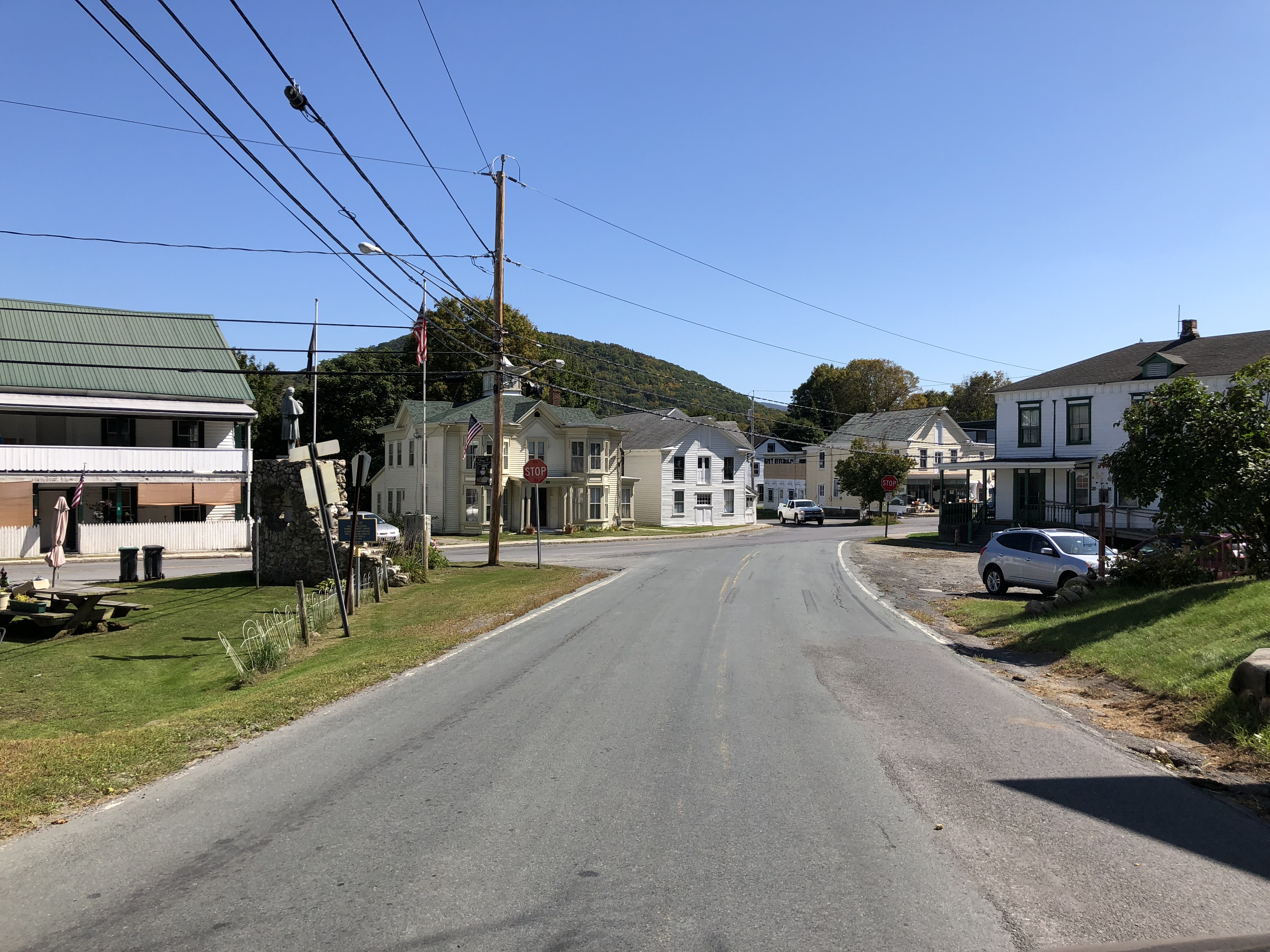
- The center of Berlin viewed from eastbound Plank Road

- Location in Rensselaer County and the state of New York.
- Coordinates: 42°41′N 73°22′W
- Country: United States
- State: New York
- County: Rensselaer

Government
  - Town Supervisor: Robert C. Jaeger

Area
  - Total: 59.92 sq mi (155.18 km^{2})
  - Land: 59.59 sq mi (154.35 km^{2})
  - Water: 0.32 sq mi (0.83 km^{2})
- Elevation: 961 ft (293 m)

Population (2020)
  - Total: 1,808
- Time zone: UTC-5 (Eastern (EST))
  - Summer (DST): UTC-4 (EDT)
- ZIP code: 12022
- Area code: 518
- FIPS code: 36-06189
- GNIS feature ID: 0978727
- Website: https://berlinnyus.gov/

Berlin (/ˈbɜːrlɪn/ BURR-lin) is a town in Rensselaer County, New York, United States. The population was 1,808 at the 2020 census. The town is named after Berlin in Germany, although natives pronounce the name differently, with the accent on the first syllable.

The town of Berlin is located on the eastern border of the county and is often pronounced with an emphasis on the first half of the name.

== History ==
The town was first settled circa 1765. It was named a town in 1806 and formed from the town of Petersburgh, one of the many New York towns with a German name. On July 25, 1962, Berlin was a site to the 1962 Berlin Explosion, Where a Semi-Truck full of 7000 gallons of propane crashed and blew up in the town killing 10 including the truck driver.

== Geography ==
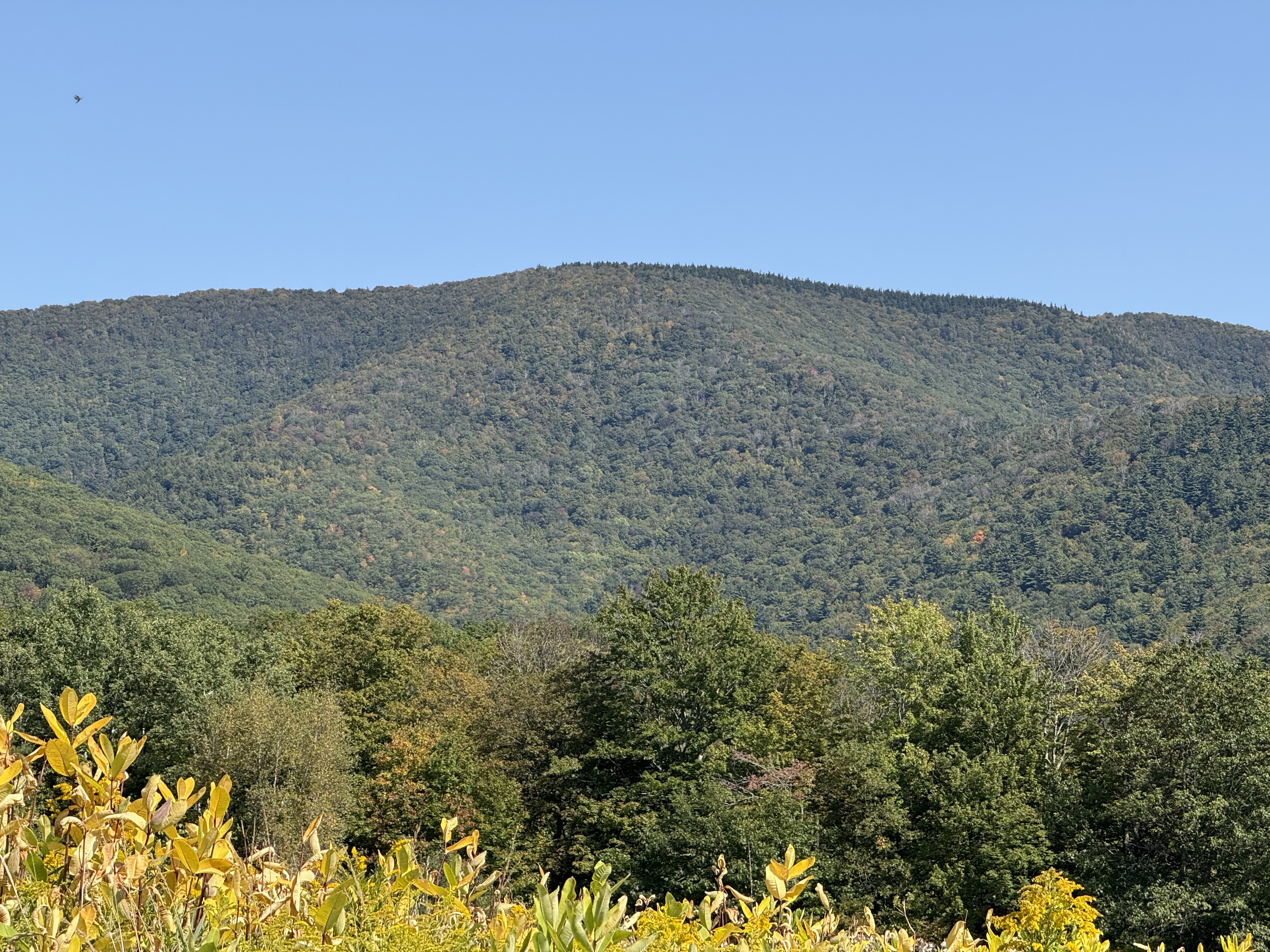
Berlin Mountain, also known to locals as Macomber Mountain, seen from Cowdry Hollow Road in Berlin @ 1,200 feet.

According to the United States Census Bureau, the town has a total area of 59.9 square miles (155 km^{2}), of which 59.7 square miles (155 km^{2}) is land and 0.3 square miles (0.78 km^{2}) (0.45%) is water.

The highest point is Berlin Mountain, 2,818 feet (859 m) above sea level, near the Massachusetts border in the Taconic Mountains. The Taconic Mountains form a barrier in the eastern part of the town so that no existing road connects the town to Massachusetts. The western portion of the town is part of the Rensselaer Plateau.

The eastern town line is the border of Massachusetts.

Berlin is home to the source of the Poesten Kill, which begins at Dyken Pond, in the northwestern corner of the town.

== Adjacent towns and areas ==
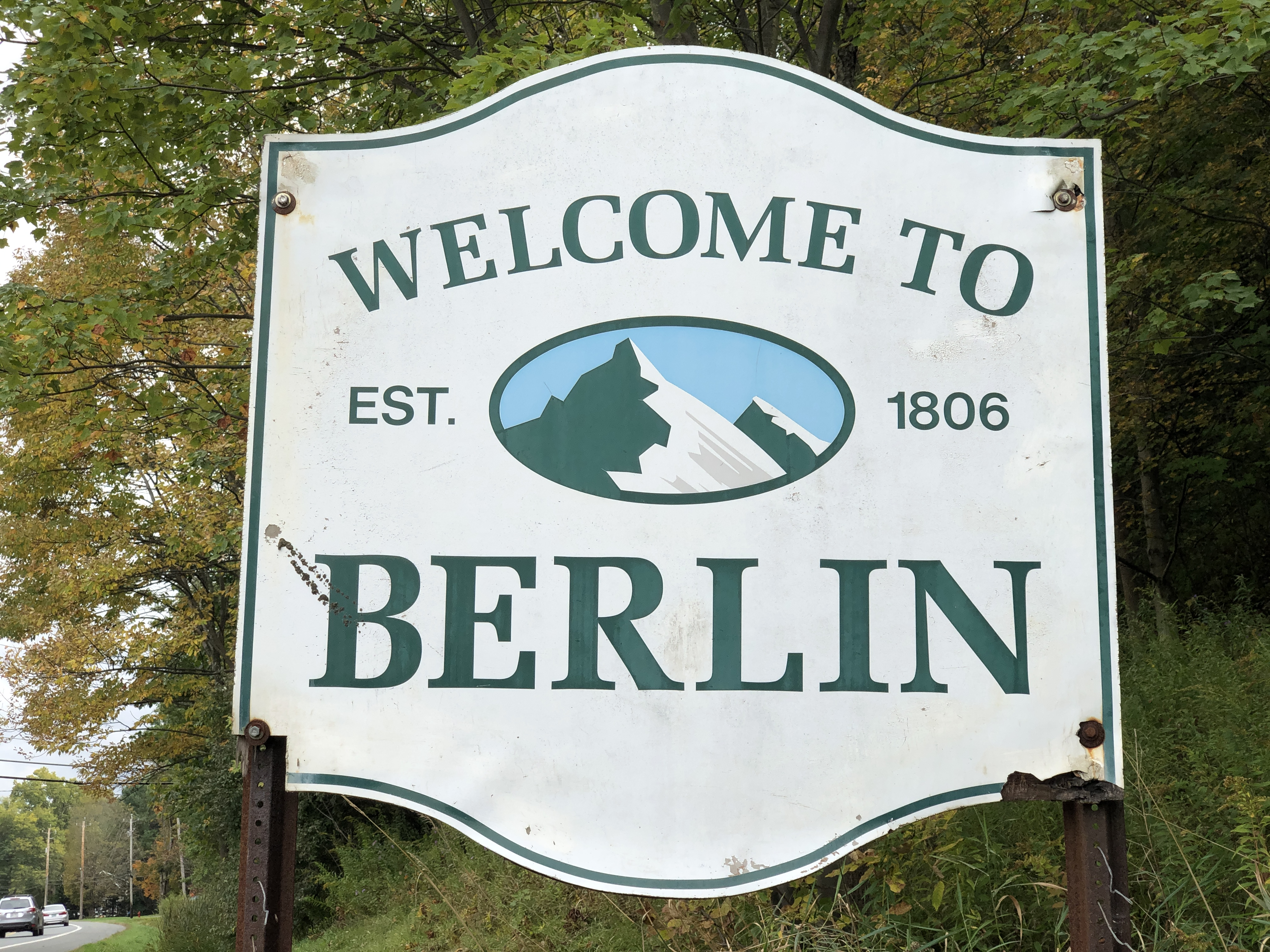
Welcome sign on NY 22 southbound

The Town of Stephentown is to the south, and the Town of Petersburgh lies to the north. The Town of Sand Lake, and the Town of Poestenkill are at the western town line, and the Towns of Williamstown and Hancock in Berkshire County, Massachusetts are on the eastern border.

== Economy ==
Going back in time, Berlin had its economic roots as a center for dairy farming, however many of the farms have been subdivided in the last decades of the 20th century. The town now serves primarily as a bedroom community for the Albany, NY capital district, but retains some notable industries.

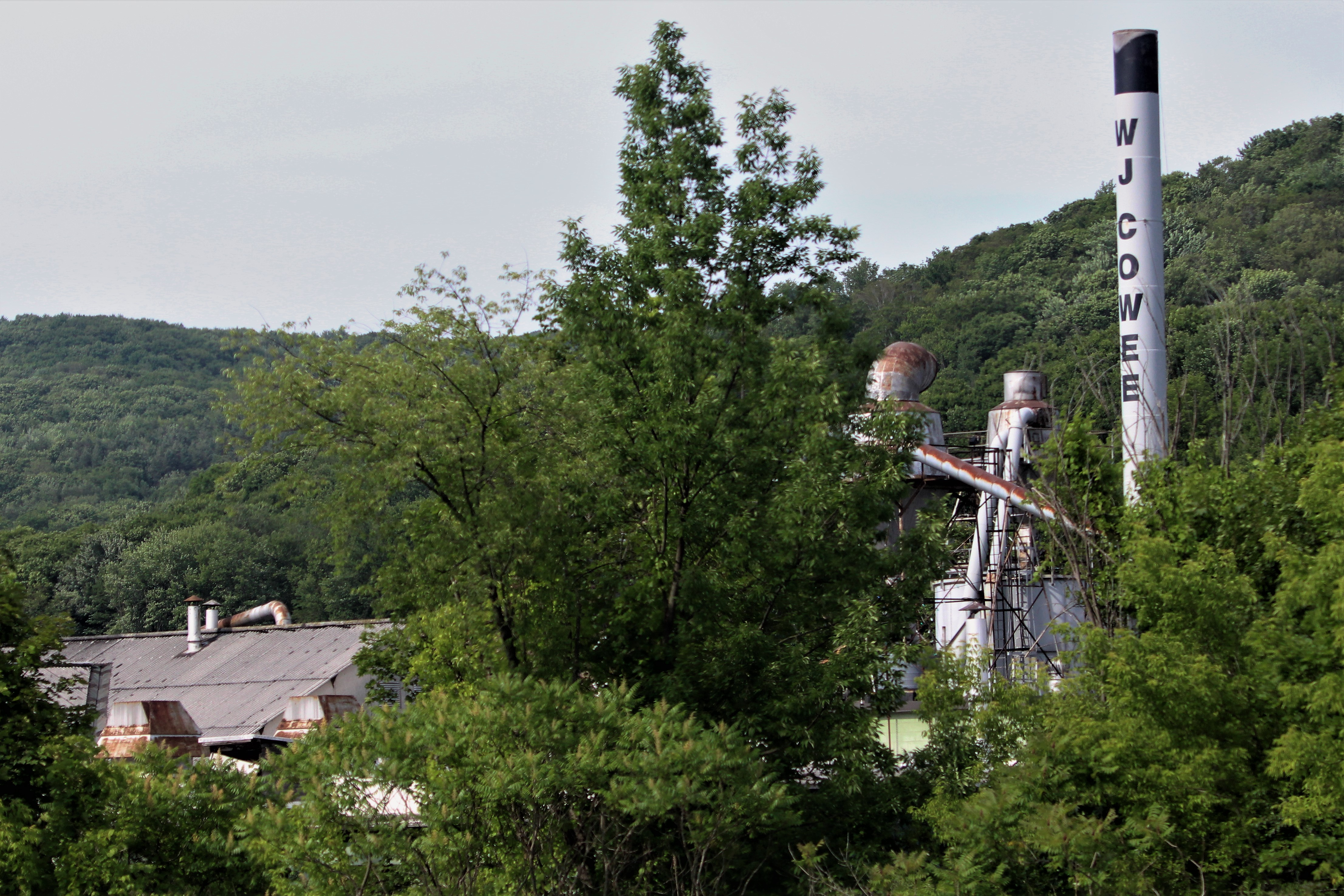
WJ Cowee in Berlin, New York

Like many small communities, Berlin has relied on one or two key employers for economic growth. These have primarily included W.J. Cowee, LLC, a manufacturer of wood products, and the Henry J. Seagroatt Co., a producer and distributor of flowers and supplies. In neighboring Petersburgh, NY, the high tech industry is represented by Taconic, a worldwide manufacturer of PTFE and dielectric materials.

== Demographics ==
Historical population
Census	Pop.	Note	%±
1820	1,986		—
1830	2,019		1.7%
1840	1,794		−11.1%
1850	2,005		11.8%
1860	2,223		10.9%
1870	2,088		−6.1%
1880	2,202		5.5%
1890	1,704		−22.6%
1900	1,677		−1.6%
1910	1,615		−3.7%
1920	1,305		−19.2%
1930	1,359		4.1%
1940	1,402		3.2%
1950	1,409		0.5%
1960	1,329		−5.7%
1970	1,562		17.5%
1980	1,696		8.6%
1990	1,929		13.7%
2000	1,901		−1.5%
2010	1,880		−1.1%
2020	1,808		−3.8%
U.S. Decennial Census

As of the census of 2000, there were 1,901 people, 729 households, and 500 families residing in the town. The population density was 31.9 inhabitants per square mile (12.3/km^{2}). There were 1,034 housing units at an average density of 17.3 per square mile (6.7/km^{2}). The racial makeup of the town was 98.42% White, 0.05% Native American, 0.32% from other races, and 1.10% from two or more races. Hispanic or Latino of any race were 2.00% of the population.

There were 729 households, out of which 33.1% had children under the age of 18 living with them, 52.9% were married couples living together, 9.5% had a female householder with no husband present, and 31.4% were non-families. 23.7% of all households were made up of individuals, and 10.2% had someone living alone who was 65 years of age or older. The average household size was 2.61 and the average family size was 3.11.

In the town, the population was spread out, with 27.9% under the age of 18, 6.4% from 18 to 24, 28.9% from 25 to 44, 23.1% from 45 to 64, and 13.6% who were 65 years of age or older. The median age was 38 years. For every 100 females, there were 99.7 males. For every 100 females age 18 and over, there were 100.6 males.

The median income for a household in the town was $34,875, and the median income for a family was $42,464. Males had a median income of $30,500 versus $26,088 for females. The per capita income for the town was $17,733. About 9.7% of families and 16.0% of the population were below the poverty line, including 19.0% of those under age 18 and 8.4% of those age 65 or over.

== Communities and locations in Berlin ==
- Berlin – The hamlet of Berlin on NY State Route 22. It was formerly called "North Berlin" after it was settled circa 1800.
- Bucks Corner – A hamlet at the junction of County Routes 40 and 41 in the western part of the town.
- Center Berlin – A hamlet south of Berlin village, on NY State Route 22.
- Cherry Plain – A hamlet in the southern part of the town on NY State Route 22.
- Cherry Plain State Park – A state park in the southwestern part of the town.
- Dyken Pond – A small lake located in the northwestern part of the town.
- Round Pond – A private pond in the western part of the town.
- Spring Lake – A private lake in the western part of the town.

== Climate ==
This climatic region is typified by large seasonal temperature differences, with warm to hot (and often humid) summers and cold (sometimes severely cold) winters. According to the Köppen Climate Classification system, Berlin has a humid continental climate, abbreviated "Dfb" on climate maps.
