= Averill Park, New York =

- CDP
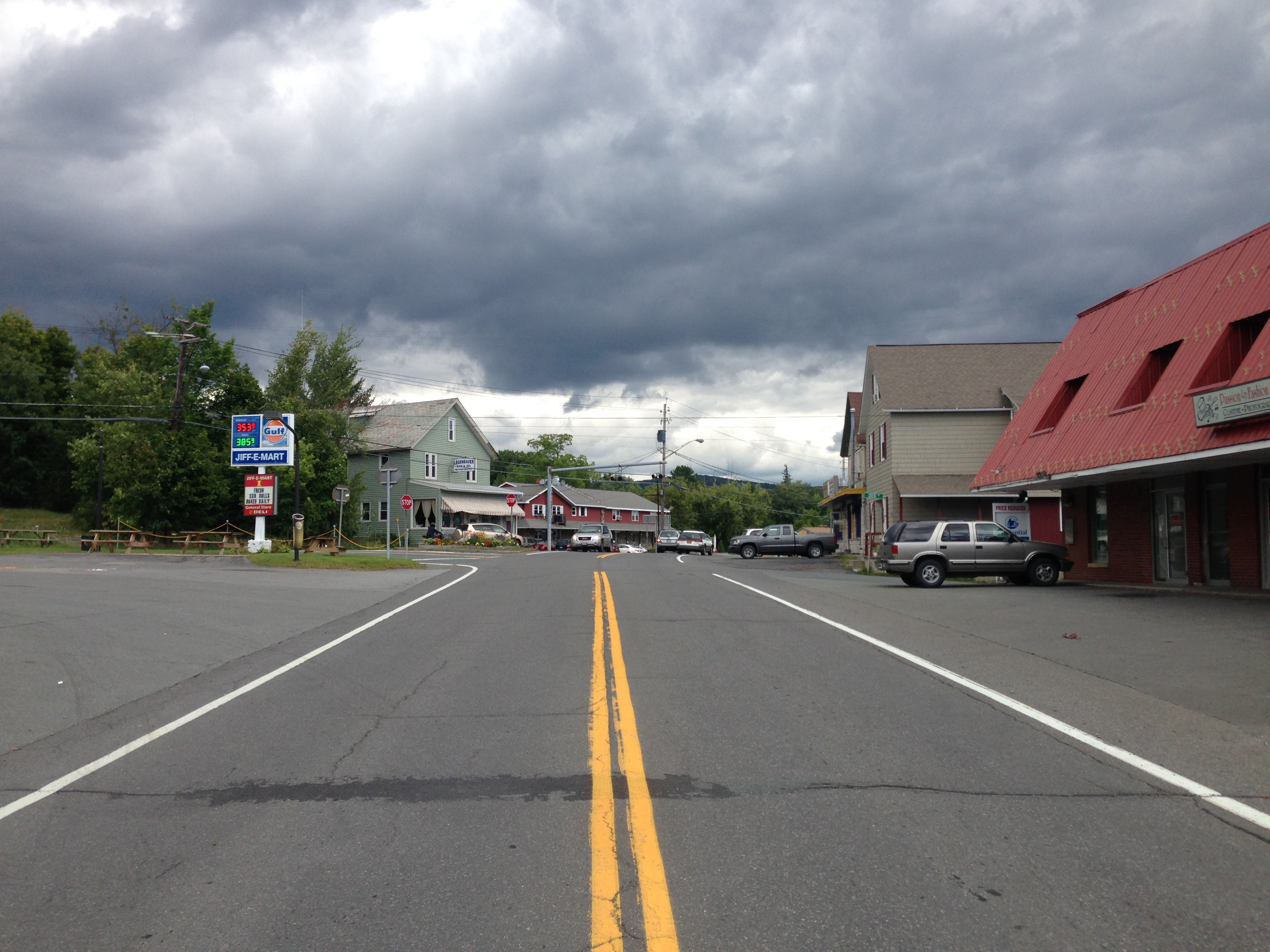
- View east along NY 43 in Averill Park

- Location in Rensselaer County and the state of New York.

- Location within the state of New York
- Coordinates: 42°38′10″N 73°33′16″W
- Country: United States
- State: New York
- County: Rensselaer
- Town: Sand Lake

Area
  - Total: 4.16 sq mi (10.77 km^{2})
  - Land: 4.04 sq mi (10.46 km^{2})
  - Water: 0.12 sq mi (0.32 km^{2})
- Elevation: 784 ft (239 m)

Population (2020)
  - Total: 2,098
  - Density: 519.7/sq mi (200.66/km^{2})
- Time zone: UTC-5 (Eastern (EST))
  - Summer (DST): UTC-4 (EDT)
- ZIP code: 12018
- Area code: 518
- FIPS code: 36-03320
- GNIS feature ID: 0942730

Averill Park is a census-designated place within the town of Sand Lake in Rensselaer County, New York, United States. The population was 2,098 at the 2020 census.

The community is named after the local Averill family. It is located on Route 43, south of Crystal Lake and east of West Sand Lake.

The Sand Lake Baptist Church was listed on the National Register of Historic Places in 2004.

== Demographics ==
Historical population
Census	Pop.	Note	%±
2000	1,517		—
2010	1,693		11.6%
2020	2,098		23.9%
U.S. Decennial Census

=== 2020 census ===
As of the 2020 census, Averill Park had a population of 2,098. The median age was 47.4 years. 19.4% of residents were under the age of 18 and 19.5% of residents were 65 years of age or older. For every 100 females there were 99.4 males, and for every 100 females age 18 and over there were 100.7 males age 18 and over.

79.7% of residents lived in urban areas, while 20.3% lived in rural areas.

There were 910 households in Averill Park, of which 26.9% had children under the age of 18 living in them. Of all households, 53.6% were married-couple households, 19.5% were households with a male householder and no spouse or partner present, and 18.8% were households with a female householder and no spouse or partner present. About 26.7% of all households were made up of individuals and 10.0% had someone living alone who was 65 years of age or older.

There were 979 housing units, of which 7.0% were vacant. The homeowner vacancy rate was 0.6% and the rental vacancy rate was 6.5%.

Racial composition as of the 2020 census
Race	Number	Percent
White	1,947	92.8%
Black or African American	21	1.0%
American Indian and Alaska Native	3	0.1%
Asian	11	0.5%
Native Hawaiian and Other Pacific Islander	0	0.0%
Some other race	11	0.5%
Two or more races	105	5.0%
Hispanic or Latino (of any race)	48	2.3%

== History ==
Originally known only as part of greater Sand Lake, the community along with neighboring towns grew with the nineteenth-century development of wool and cotton textile manufacturing by local watermills and knitting factories along the Wynants Kill tributary of the Hudson River. By the 1880s, several independent local mills produced hosiery, undergarments, and knit shirts.

The hamlet was named Averill in 1880 after a local leading family, then in 1882 renamed Averill Park in promotion of local summer-resort development and of the Troy & New England Railway, a never-completed trolley and freight line intended to connect the city of Troy, New York with the mills and summer resorts of Averill Park and its “upstate Coney Island” recreational Crystal Lake Beach, and with the mills of the neighboring town of West Sand Lake.

The local mills declined after the increasing efficiency of steam and electrical power improved competition from regional factories, and were then destroyed by a 1891 river flood. The Faith Knitting Company (later Faith Mills), founded in 1897, restored local industry by buying and re-equipping the old mills and rehiring local labor. Other late-nineteenth- and early-twentieth-century firms included Jake Warger's Dry Goods Store; Gilbert Beebe's blacksmith shop; Stout's Hardware; and Park Pharmacy, where Jerry Lewis worked as a soda jerk in 1942 when his father was a superintendent at Faith Mills.

Mid-nineteenth- to early twentieth-century seasonal hotels included Al's Place, Hilke's Averill Park Hotel (previously housing Scram's Collegiate Institute), Traveler's Rest (aka Sand Lake House, Tillotson's Hotel, and Wagner's Hotel), the Lake View Hotel (aka Blake's and the Gabler Hotel, later housing the Averill Park Female Seminary), and Clum's. For mill workers and townspeople, Faith Mills's Clubhouse was “the entertainment center of the town for many years,” complete with dance hall, motion picture parlor, cafeteria, bowling alleys, pocket billiard room, and shower room.

Faith Mills's decline, and with it that of Averill Park, began in the Great Depression, during which local textile mills did not regain business till 1932. During World War II, manufacture of wool blankets and long woolen underwear for the military earned Faith Mills four rare “excellence in production” Army-Navy "E" Awards.

From 1955 to 1962, Faith Mills, by then one of only three remaining U.S. manufacturers of woolen long underwear “considered obsolete by most persons” as the market shifted to cotton undergarments, was sold to holding companies and downsized to one factory in Averill Park employing as few as 54 workers, finally closing in 1962. In 1965, the factory was to manufacture a “floor-sweeping compound” and become a warehouse for corrugated shipping containers, employing 15 workers.

== 2010 demographics ==
As of the census of 2010, The racial makeup of the CDP was 85.4% White, 6.5% African American, 4.1% Asian, and 4.0% from two or more races. Hispanic or Latino of any race were 7.4% of the population.

There were 571 households in the CDP, out of which 41.0% had children under the age of 18 living with them, 58.2% were married couples living together, 12.2% had a female householder with no husband present, and 26.4% were non-families. 20.2% of all households were made up of individuals, and 9.7% had someone living alone who was 65 years of age or older. The average household size was 2.68 and the average family size was 3.09. In the CDP, the population was spread out, with 28.8% under the age of 18, 7.9% from 18 to 24, 24.3% from 25 to 44, 29.7% from 45 to 64, and 9.3% who were 65 years of age or older. The median age was 39 years. For every 100 females, there were 93.7 males. For every 100 females age 18 and over, there were 93.9 males. The median income for a household in the CDP was $44,000, and the median income for a family was $49,367. Males had a median income of $34,909 versus $26,890 for females. The per capita income for the CDP was $26,226. About 8.0% of families and 17.3 of the population were below the poverty line, including 10.4% of those under age 18 and 19.1% of those age 65 or over.

== 2000 demographics ==
As of the census of 2000, there were 1,517 people, 597 households, and 420 families residing in the CDP. The population density was 507.2 inhabitants per square mile (195.8/km^{2}). There were 628 housing units at an average density of 210.0 per square mile (81.1/km^{2}). The racial makeup of the CDP was 96.89% White, 1.26% African American, 1.46% Asian, and 1.38% from two or more races. Hispanic or Latino of any race were 2.99% of the population.

== Schools ==
- Averill Park School District
  - Averill Park High School
  - Miller Hill - Sand Lake Elementary School
- Specialty Schools
  - Luis LaBoy Technical School
  - Crenshaw Charter School
  - Taborton Alternative School

== Climate ==
This climatic region is typified by large seasonal temperature differences, with warm to hot (and often humid) summers and cold (sometimes severely cold) winters. According to the Köppen Climate Classification system, Averill Park has a humid continental climate, abbreviated "Dfb" on climate maps.

== Sites of interest ==
Arts Letters & Numbers, on Burden Lake Road, is a nonprofit arts center offering workshops, performances, and residencies, housed in a complex including the former Sand Lake Cotton Factory, which operated as Arnolds, Hunt & Co. until 1875 and was later run by Faith Mills; and also the residence built by mill owner George Arnold.

Hollywood Drive-In Theatre, on New York State Route 66, is a four-hundred-car drive-in theater built in 1952.
