= Sand Lake, New York =

- Town
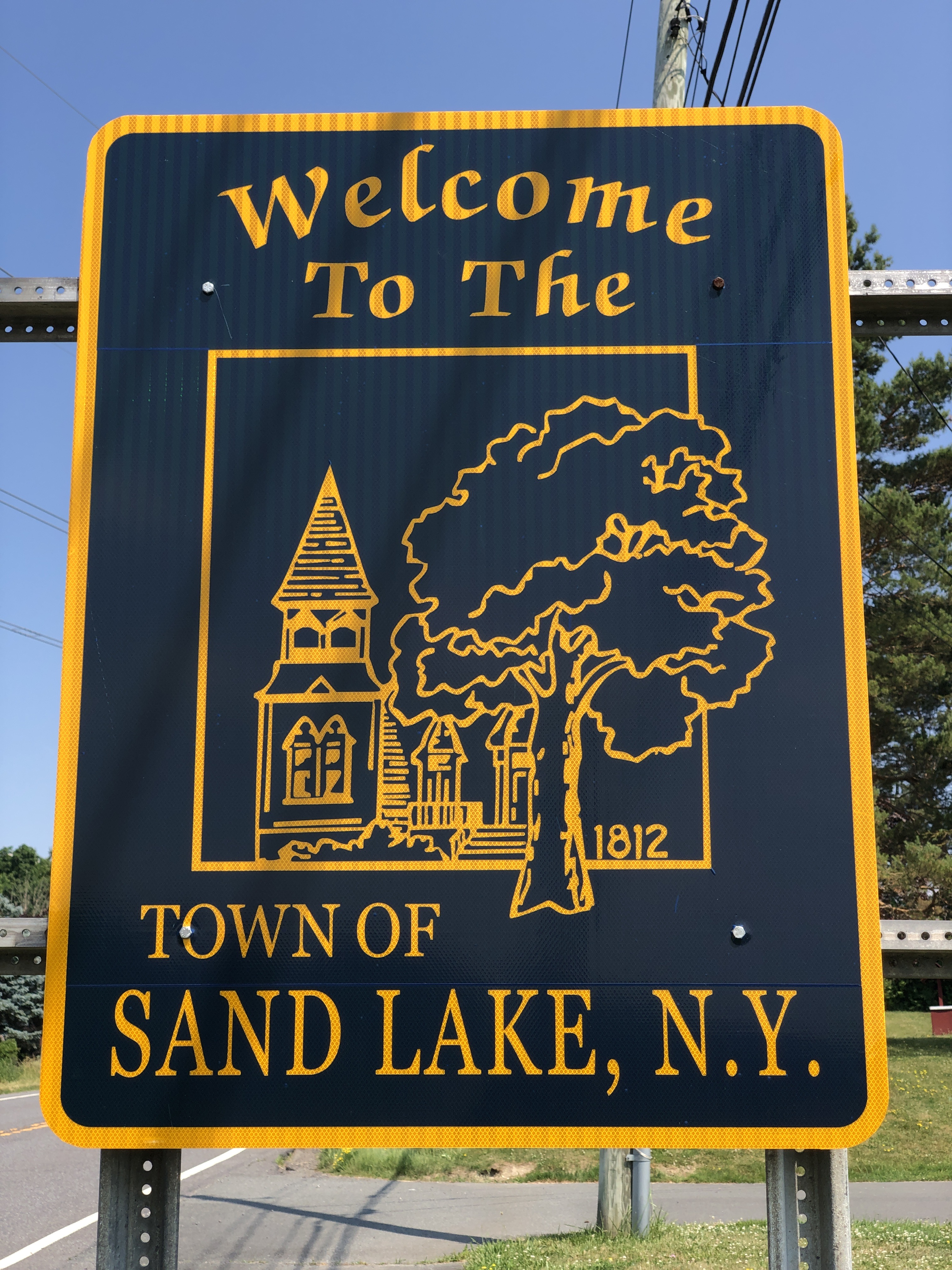
- Sign at the west entrance to Sand Lake
- Motto: A Place of Picnics, Porches and Progress
- Location in Rensselaer County and the state of New York.
- Coordinates: 42°37′34″N 73°34′2″W
- Country: United States
- State: New York
- County: Rensselaer
- Established: June 19, 1812

Government
  - Type: Town Board and Council
  - Town Supervisor: Flora Fasoldt (D)

Area
  - Total: 36.17 sq mi (93.68 km^{2})
  - Land: 35.05 sq mi (90.78 km^{2})
  - Water: 1.12 sq mi (2.90 km^{2})
- Elevation: 823 ft (251 m)

Population (2020)
  - Total: 8,348
  - Density: 238.2/sq mi (91.96/km^{2})
- Time zone: UTC-5 (Eastern (EST))
  - Summer (DST): UTC-4 (EDT)
- ZIP code: 12153
- Area code: 518
- FIPS code: 36-65013
- GNIS feature ID: 0979455
- Website: townofsandlake.us

Sand Lake is a town in south-central part of Rensselaer County, New York, United States. Sand Lake is about 13 miles east of Albany, New York. As of the 2020 census, the population was 8,348. Within the town are a number of hamlets: West Sand Lake, Averill Park, Glass Lake, Sliters and the hamlet of Sand Lake. Its five lakes are a source of recreation. Many commercial enterprises of the 19th century and into the 20th century relied on power generated from the Wynants Kill Creek and Burden Lake mills. The area is known for its fertile soil for grazing and agriculture.

== History ==
=== Early history ===
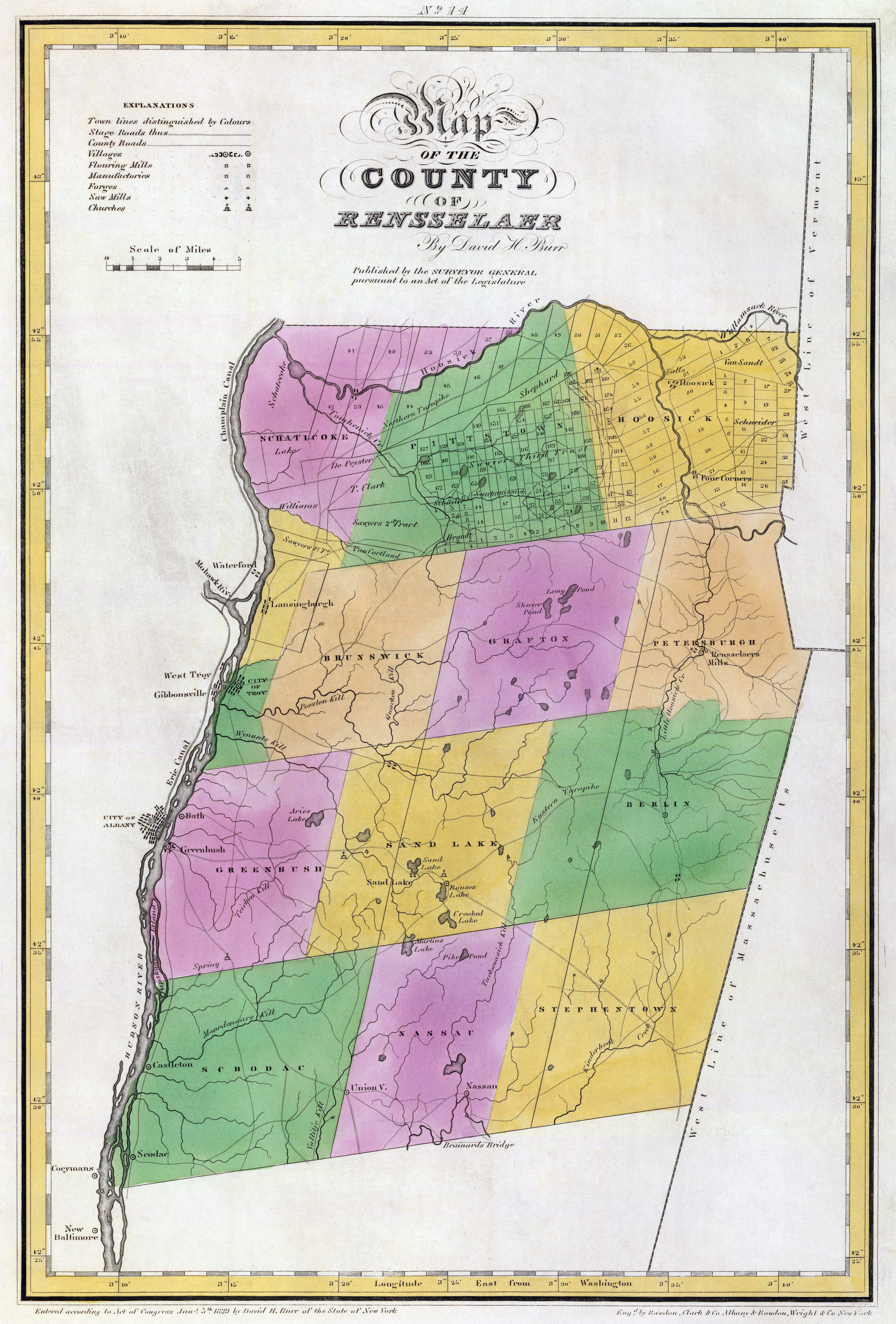
Map of Rensselaer County in 1829 showing the pre-partition Town of Sand Lake

Sand Lake was first home to Native Americans. In 1629, Kiliaen van Rensselaer acquired a 700,000-acre land grant to establish a Dutch colony, encompassing what later became Sand Lake. Called the Manor of Rensselaerswyck, it was 48 miles across and 24 miles long. In 1664, it became a colony of England and was called the Province of New York. It flipped back to the Dutch in 1672, and returned to the English in 1674.

In the 1750s, Dutch settlers moved into what is now Sand Lake, followed by German pioneers. By 1772, present day Sand Lake was in the Rensselaerwyck District of Albany County. It was held by the English until the Revolutionary War (1775–1783). In 1792, when the town of Rensselaerwyck was divided into two towns, Greenbush and Stephentown. Present day Sand Lake extended into both towns.

In 1805, the Union Meetinghouse was built for worship by Methodists, Baptists, and Presbyterians. It was the town's oldest public building and was a station on the Underground Railroad. (Note: In 1776, a log building was constructed at Rensselaerwyck, about one mile southwest of West Sand Lake, that served as a school, Lutheran church, and residence for a pastor.)

=== Town of Sand Lake ===
The town of Sand Lake was formed from Greenbush and Berlin from an act of the legislature on March 21, 1812, and it was officially made a town on March 1, 1813. (Note: In 1843, a part of Greenbush was returned, and in 1848 the northern half was set off as a separate town under the name of Poestenkill.) Municipal positions were established to be responsible to its citizens, including town clerk, assessors, and more. Calvin Thompson became the first Supervisor. The first postmaster, in 1815, was Daniel M. Gregory. The soil, especially on the eastern lowlands, is fertile for grazing and agriculture, particularly small fruit, strawberries, and other berrys.

A new church building was established for the Trinity Lutheran Church in 1816. The Zion Evangelical Lutheran Church opened in 1816 at the West Sand Lake site. There were a number of changes in the churches and its membership around the 1830s. (Note: The meetinghouse of 1805 was split into separate Methodist, Presbyterian and Baptists churches. The Zion Evangelical Lutheran Church was renamed the First Evangelical Lutheran Church in 1838 when a dispute among parishioners about temperance and abolition resulted in a division of the church. Some of the parishioners became members of the Second Evangelical Lutheran Church, which was an Underground Railroad station prior to the Civil War.) The present town borders were established on March 2, 1848, when the town of Sand Lake was divided into towns, Sand Lake and Poestenkill. The town was governed by a supervisor, town clerk and four justices of the peace. Town business was conducted in homes and inns for decades.

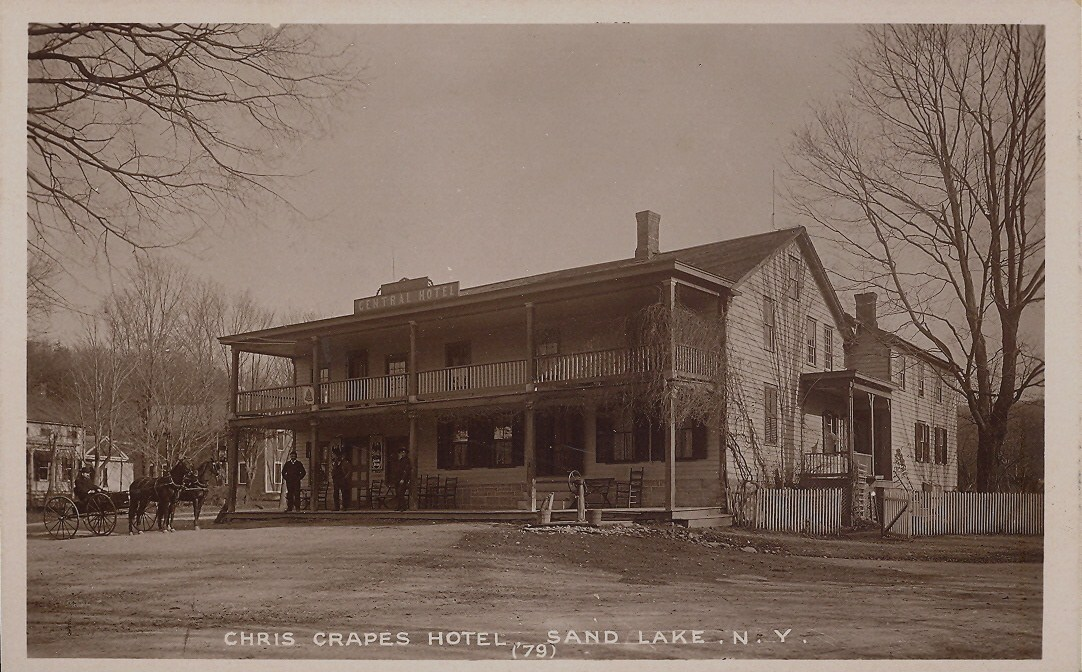
Chris Crapes Hotel, about 1910

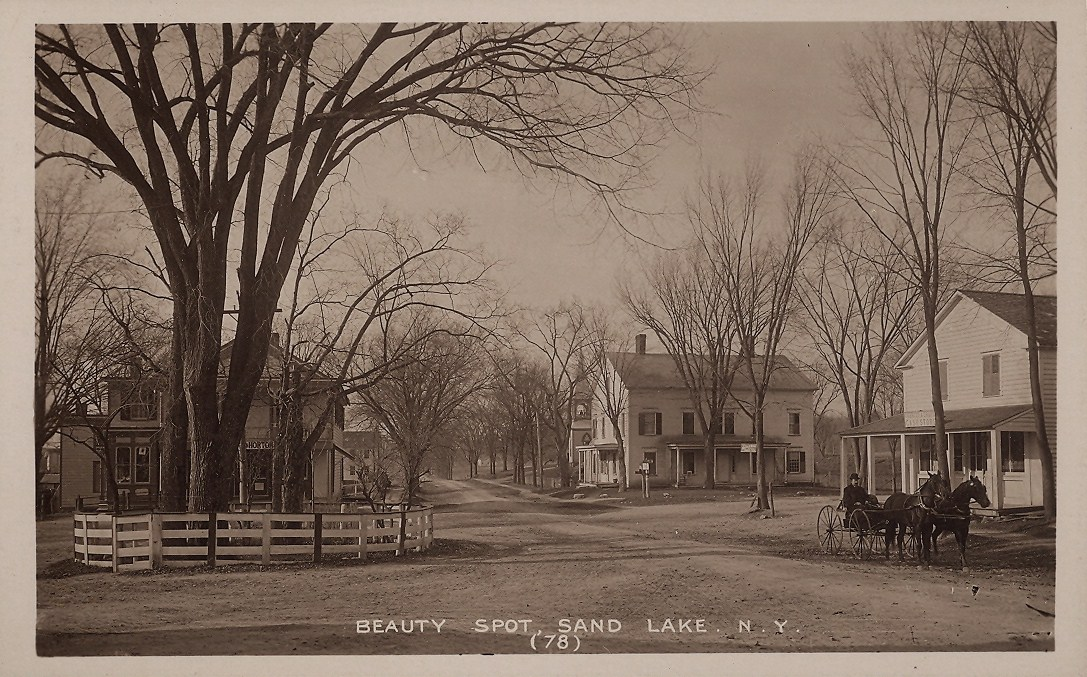
Street scene, about 1910

There were a number of public and private schools established between 1825 and the early 20th century. (Note: There were a number of public and private schools established between 1825 and into the early 20th century: Gregory's school (1825), Sliter's Corners (now in the hamlet of Sand Lake) school (1854), Sand Lake Academy, and a school at the Second Lutheran Church (1854). Between the 1860s and 1889 the Scram's Institute boarding school for boys (1852), Brookside Institute (1860s), Sand Lake Female Seminary (1880s), a private Day school was operated by Fannie Howard (1899), and Nellie Clark operated a private school (year not stated).) A one-room schoolhouse operated in Sand Lake from 1895 until 1929.

In 1866, the Wynantskill Improvement Association created three Burden Lakes from Martins Lake by diverting water from Wynantskill Creek. The lake water turned the Burden water wheel that powered commercial enterprises, like mills, of the Industrial Revolution.

The Troy and New England Railway provided electric trolley service from Troy into Sand Lake from 1895 to 1925. The nine-mile route ran from Albia (of Troy) east to Averill Park. The town's economy grew with tourism and people who became residents during the summer.

Municipal Home Rule Law was enacted in 1964 by the State Legislature, which gave towns greater powers. In 1968, Rensselaer County revised its form of government, replacing the Board of Supervisors with a County Executive and a County Legislature. In 1972, a town hall was established in the former Presbyterian Church.

The Albert R. Fox House was listed on the National Register of Historic Places in 2001.

== Hamlets ==
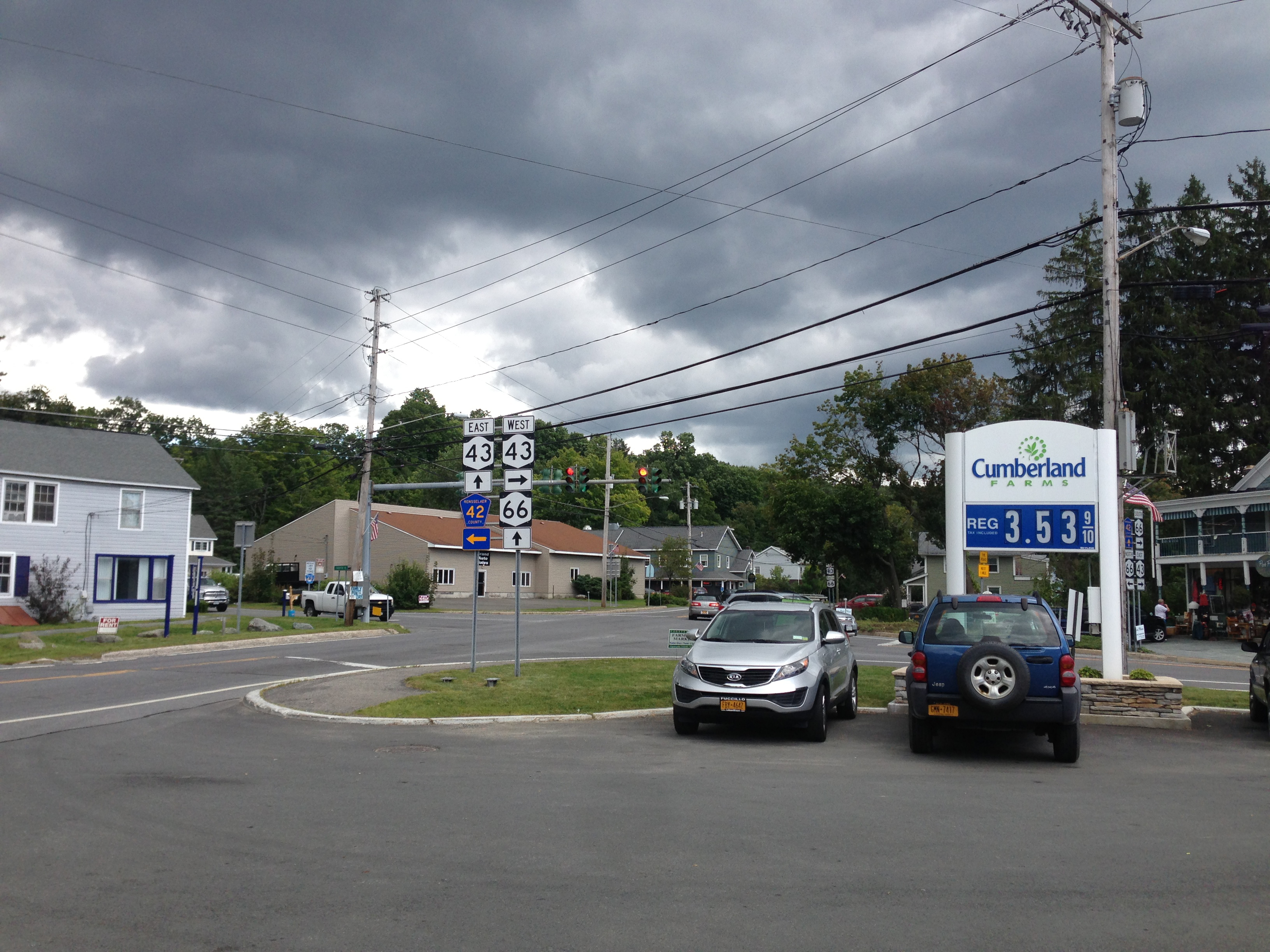
Intersection of NY 43, NY 66 and CR 42 in the hamlet of Sand Lake

Averill Park, Sand Lake, Glass Lake, and West Sand Lake are hamlets within the greater town of Sand Lake.

=== Averill Park ===
Averill Park is a hamlet near the center of the town. The Averill post office was established in 1880, with Frank Pettit as first postmaster; the name was changed to Averill Park in 1882. Faith Mills (1829-1966) is one of the textile factories that were established, starting in the early 19th century, along what is now Burden Lake Road. It was powered with water from the Wynantskill. It is located east of West Sand Lake and has a number of retail businesses, two churches, and the Averill Park High School. The main street has businesses from the mid-19th century.

=== Sand Lake ===
Sand Lake is the smallest hamlet of Sand Lake. There are several retail business, the Sand Lake Center for the Arts, a post office, town hall, a tavern, cemetery, and an elementary school. Historic and stately houses are found in Sand Lake, with houses further away from one another than the other two hamlets.

=== West Sand Lake ===
West Sand Lake is a hamlet in the northwestern corner of the town. In 1793, Bernhard Uhlein, a soldier of the American Revolutionary War, settled here and established a 325-acre farm. He received the land from a land grant from Patroon VanRensselaer. The settlement was first known as Ulinesville. The post office for was established in 1834, with Frost Myers as postmaster.

The community became West Sand Lake in 1838. It is the largest of the four hamlets, with the most residents. There are houses dating back to the early 1800s in the western part of the hamlet. It has a number of retail businesses, schools, banks, two churches and a post office.

=== Glass Lake ===
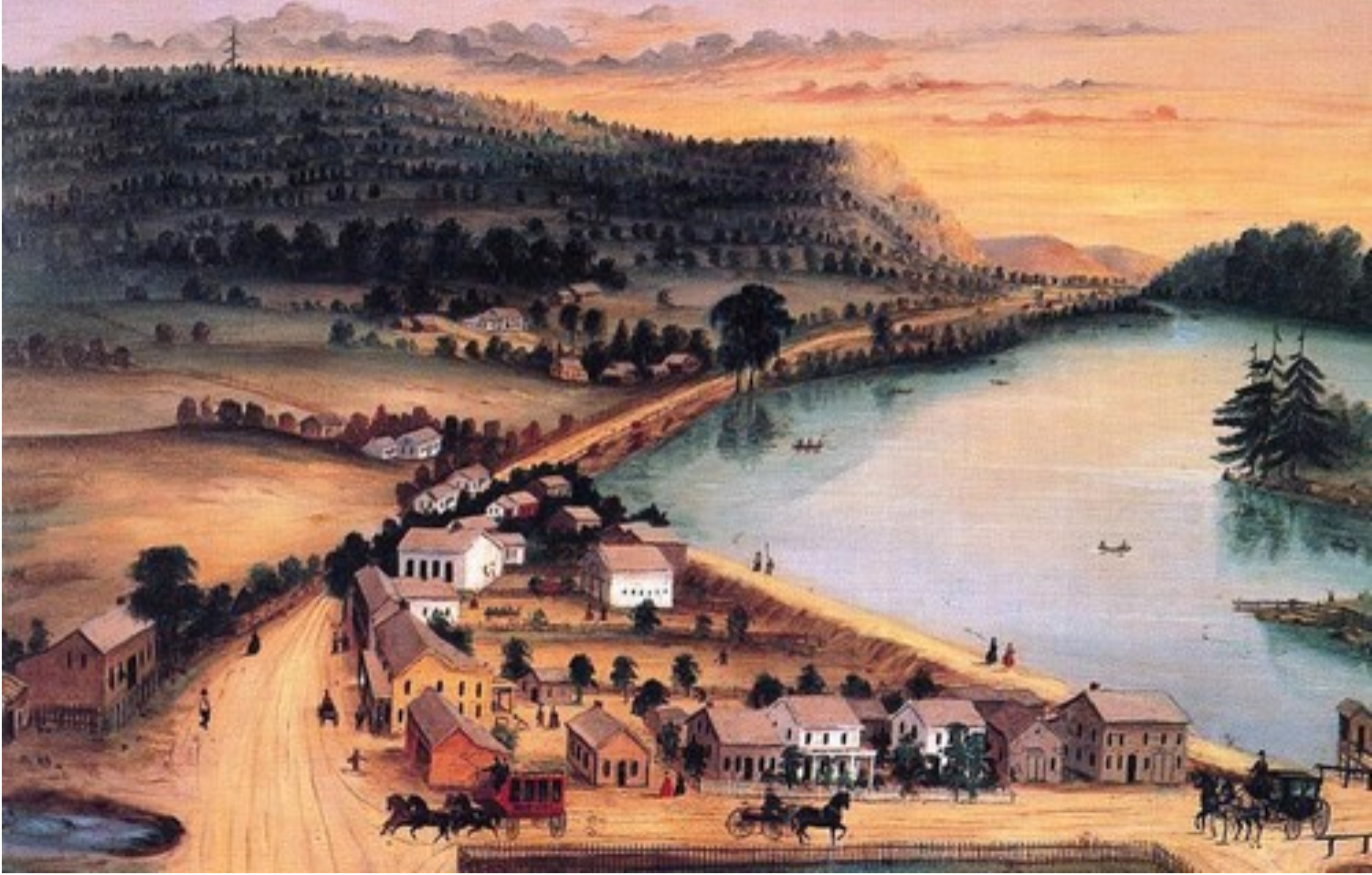
View of Glass Lake, c. 1855, by Joseph Hidley

The Glass Lake area grew up around the Rensselaer Glass Factory that Jeremiah Van Rensselaer founded in 1804. It had homes for 34 workers, a store, school, doctor's office, and more residential and commercial buildings. It is located at Glass Lake, which is the headwaters of the Wynants Kill Creek. A historical marker is located at Routes 43 and 66 at Glass Lake Road.. The original name of Glass Lake was Van Rensselaer Village, and it has also been known as Glass House.

== Other areas ==
Sand Lake also has populated places named Maple Grove, Sliter's Corner, and Taborton.

=== Sliters ===
The South Sand Lake post office was established there in 1854, with William Stevens as first postmaster.. The hamlet was subsequently renamed Sliters.

== Geography ==
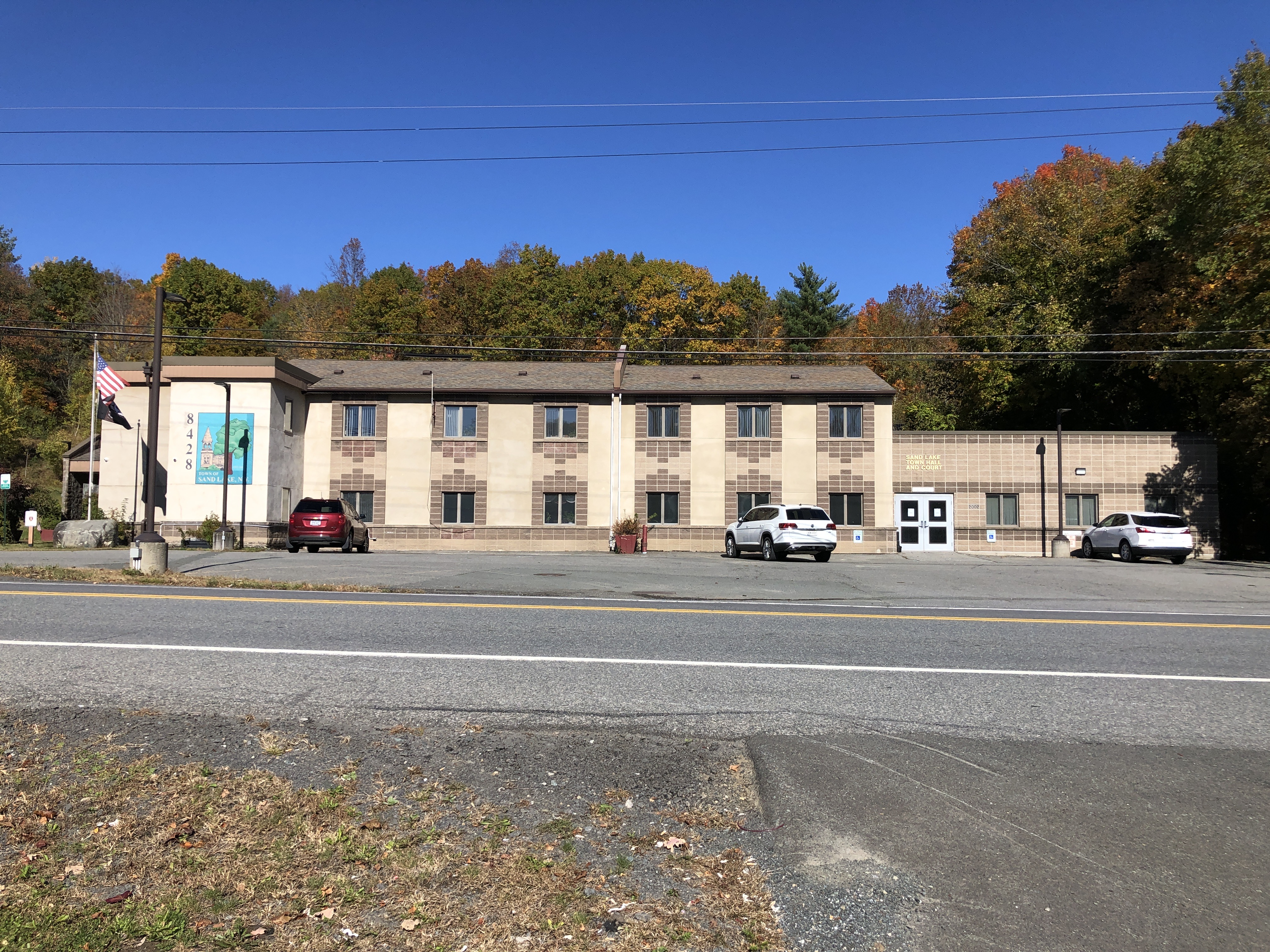
Town hall

While the surface of the town is undulating in the west, it is quite mountainous in the east, a part of the Rensselaer Plateau. Oak and Perigo hills are about 900 feet above sea level. According to the United States Census Bureau, the town has a total area of 36.2 square miles (94 km^{2}), of which 35.2 square miles (91 km^{2}) is land and 0.9 square miles (2.3 km^{2}) (2.63%) is water.

=== Lakes ===
Within Sand Lake, there are five lakes: Racquet Lake (Reichards Lake), Burden Lake, Crooked Lake, Crystal Lake, and Glass Lake. The lakes, stocked with many kinds of fresh water fish, draw tourists to the area.

==== Racquet Lake ====
Racquet Lake (often referred to as Reichards Lake) is located north of the Hamlet of West Sand Lake. It is the location of the town beach.

==== Glass Lake ====
Glass Lake is north of Crooked Lake, and is fed by it. At 123 acres, it is located in Averill Park.. A dam at the north end dates from the 1850s. It was built by the mill owners of the Wynantskill Association to improve the supply of water for mill operations.

==== Burden Lake ====
Burden Lake is located in the southern part of the town of Sand Lake and is partially in the town of Nassau, it is a total of 369 acres.. Burden Lake is partially artificial. The southernmost section of the lake was originally Martins Lake. In the 1850s, mill owners engineered the water flow using a canal, a weir, and a dam to direct part of the flow of the Wynantskill into the area that is now Burden Lake, creating a reservoir to insure a smooth supply of water.

==== Crystal Lake ====
Crystal Lake, originally called Sand Lake, is the largest lake in the Averill Park hamlet in the town of Sand Lake. It is 66 acres in size.. A small dam at the south end of the lake was built by mill owners to raise the level of the lake slightly and improve the water supply.

==== Crooked Lake ====
Crooked Lake is located in the southern part of the town of Sand Lake, south of Glass Lake. It is 113 acres. Wynants Kill is a stream that flows from Crooked Lake, through Glass Lake, and drains into both Richard Pond and the Hudson River.. A small dam at the north end of the lake was built by mill owners to raise the level of the lake slightly and improve the water supply.

== Demographics ==
Historical population
Census	Pop.	Note	%±
1820	3,302		—
1830	3,671		11.2%
1840	4,303		17.2%
1850	2,558		−40.6%
1860	2,502		−2.2%
1870	2,633		5.2%
1880	2,550		−3.2%
1890	2,555		0.2%
1900	2,299		−10.0%
1910	2,128		−7.4%
1920	1,916		−10.0%
1930	2,022		5.5%
1940	2,488		23.0%
1950	3,254		30.8%
1960	4,629		42.3%
1970	5,843		26.2%
1980	7,022		20.2%
1990	7,642		8.8%
2000	7,987		4.5%
2010	8,530		6.8%
2020	8,348		−2.1%
U.S. Decennial Census

As of the 2020 census, the population was 8,348. In 2010 there were 8,530 people, 3,009 households, and 2,229 families residing in the town. The population density was 226.9 inhabitants per square mile (87.6/km^{2}). There were 3,277 housing units at an average density of 93.1 per square mile (35.9/km^{2}). The racial makeup of the town was 96.4% Non Hispanic White, 0.4% African American, 0.11% Native American, 0.50% Asian and 1.1% from two or more races. Hispanic or Latino origin were 1.5% of the population. Ancestries: German (25.2%), Irish (22.6%), English (14.6%), Italian (13.8%), French (8.9%), Polish (6.1%).

There were 3,009 households, out of which 37.1% had children under the age of 18 living with them, 58.6% were married couples living together, 11.8% had a female householder with no husband present, and 25.9% were non-families. 20.6% of all households were made up of individuals, and 7.9% had someone living alone who was 65 years of age or older. The average household size was 2.65 and the average family size was 3.08.

In the town, the population was spread out, with 26.6% under the age of 18, 6.1% from 18 to 24, 28.6% from 25 to 44, 28.1% from 45 to 64, and 10.6% who were 65 years of age or older. The median age was 39 years. For every 100 females, there were 95.7 males. For every 100 females age 18 and over, there were 93.7 males.

The median income for a household in the town was $77,372, and the median income for a family was $97,009. Males had a median income of $67,132 versus $48,321 for females. The per capita income for the town was $36,103. The Median household income for White households is $75,474 compared to $2,157,374 for Asian households and $223,858 for African American households. About 6.7% of families and 7.7% of the population were below the poverty line, including 6.3% of those under age 18 and 10.3% of those age 65 or over.

== Sports ==
- Stock car racing – Sand Lake contributed to the rising popularity of auto racing after World War II. Burden Lake Speedway, a 1/4-mile (0.40 km) dirt oval facility opened in 1948 near the hamlet of Averill Park. Along with the Pine Bowl and Route 66 Speedways in the adjoining town of Poestenkill and Carroll's Grove Speedway in the nearby town of Brunswick, Rensselaer County became a hub for the sport. Pine Bowl was the longest-lasting of the county’s four tracks, operating through 1966. (Note: Geolocation of Burden Lake Speedway: 42.6217°N 73.5817°W)

== Notable people ==
- Levancia Holcomb Plumb (1841-1923), business woman, financier, and temperance reformer
- Kenny Tremont Jr. (born 1961), Hall of Fame auto racing driver
