= List of octagon houses =

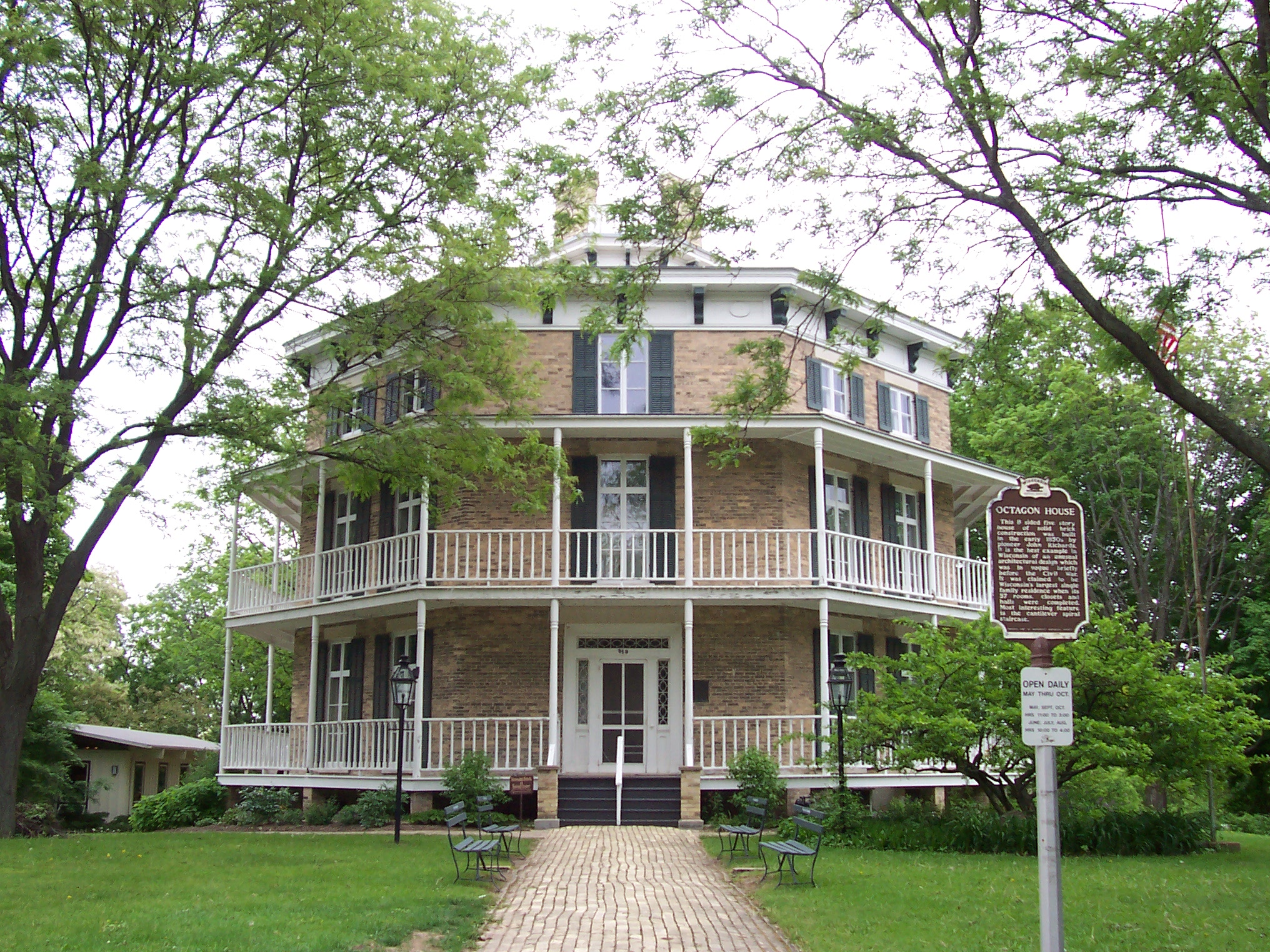
Octagon House in Watertown, Wisconsin, built 1853

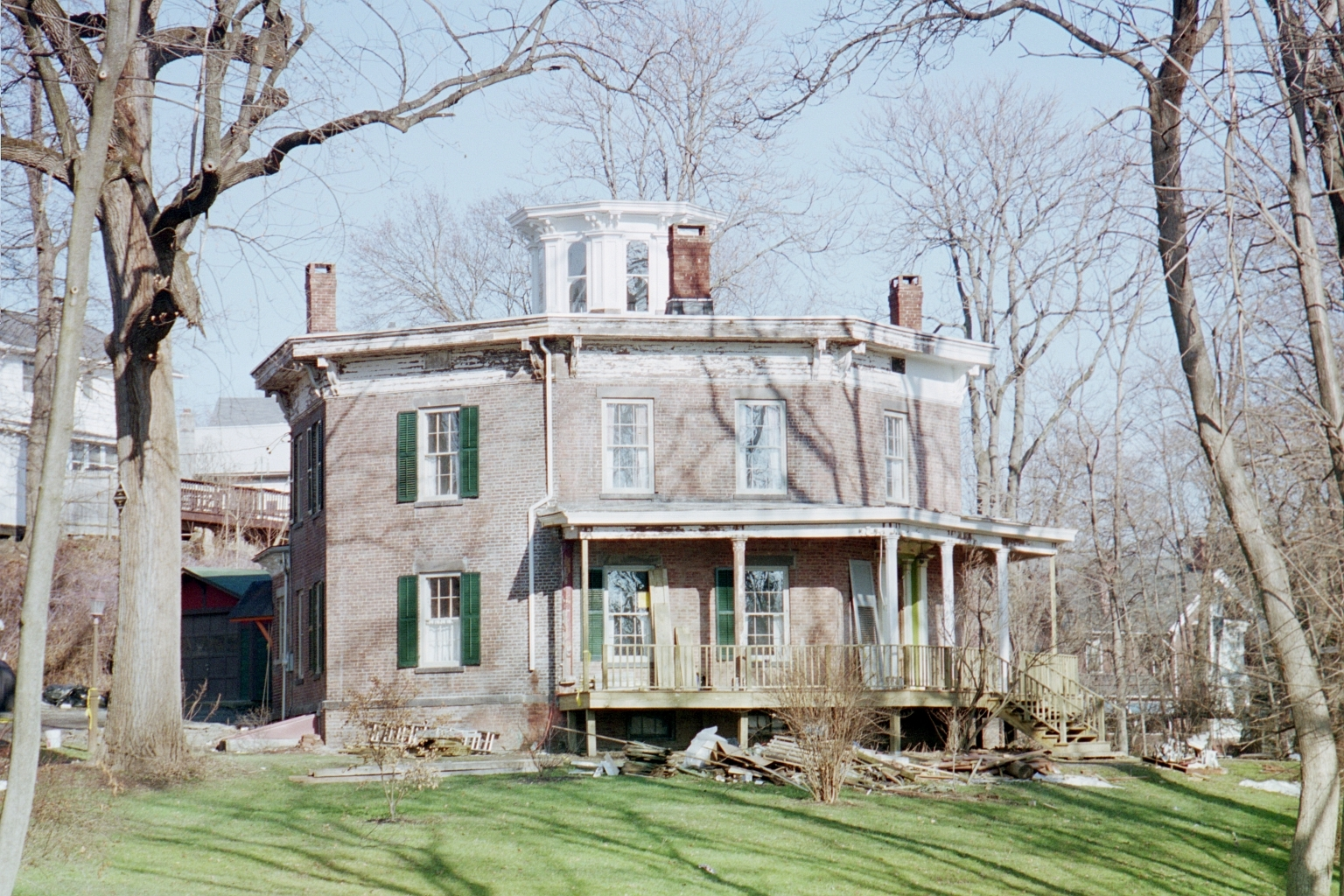
David Van Gelder Octagon House in Catskill, New York, built 1860, photographed on January 13, 2008

This is a list of octagon houses. The style became popular in the United States and Canada following the publication of Orson Squire Fowler's 1848 book The Octagon House, A Home for All. In the United States, 68 surviving octagon houses are included on the U.S. National Register of Historic Places (NRHP). The earliest and most notable octagon house in the Americas was Thomas Jefferson's 1806 Poplar Forest.

Orson Squire Fowler's 1848 book The Octagon House, A Home for All and his "monumental" four-story, 60-room house built during 1848–1853, Fowler's Folly in Fishkill, New York, provided inspiration for a nationwide fad. Fifty-nine of the sixty-six pre-Civil War houses on the NRHP were built between 1849 and 1861. It is reported that the owner of the first-built of these, the Rich-Twinn Octagon House in western New York, was impressed by seeing an octagon house in the Hudson River Valley, presumably Fowler's home under construction.

== Canada ==
At least 20 historic octagon houses are known to exist in Canada, distributed across four eastern provinces. (Note: In Canada, the octagon house craze also engendered an octagonal deadhouse phenomenon. This included octagonal deadhouses, pre-burial edifices, built in the mid-to-late 19th century along Yonge Street in south-central Ontario, from just north of Toronto to Aurora. At least 3 octagon houses are classified as heritage sites, one in Richmond Hill and the other in King.) Extant octagon houses in Canada include the following:

- In New Brunswick
  - Pocologan
  - Sackville: Captain George Anderson House, built in 1855, is a locally designated heritage site
- In Nova Scotia
  - Tatamagouche: Fraser Octagon House, built in 1857, provincially designated heritage site
- In Ontario

- Ameliasburg, Prince Edward County
- Bowmanville
- Bracebridge: Woodchester Villa, a provincially designated heritage site
- Brantford
- Burlington: The Thomas Pickett Octagonal House, built 1860, at 6103 Guelph Line, designated under the Ontario Heritage Act
- Calabogie: 15 Octagon Lane
- Clark's Corners, Oxford County
- Kingsville
- Rupert Octagonal House (1855), Maple, at 2600 Major MacKenzie Drive (43°51′10″N 79°31′26″W), now Delano Academy
- Milton
- Morton, northeast of Kingston, former octagon schoolhouse, also used as a residence
- Mount Pleasant, Brant County: 646 Mount Pleasant Road, now used as a spa
- Niagara Falls: Bradley Octagon House, built 1906, at 5783 Summer Street
- Otterville: Woodlawn Octagon House, built 1861, moved from Millvale
- Peel Region: 8280 Heritage Road, near Huttonville
- Port Hope, built 1856
- Picton, Prince Edward County, built ca. 1860
- Westport, on Upper Rideau Lake

- In Quebec
  - Guérin
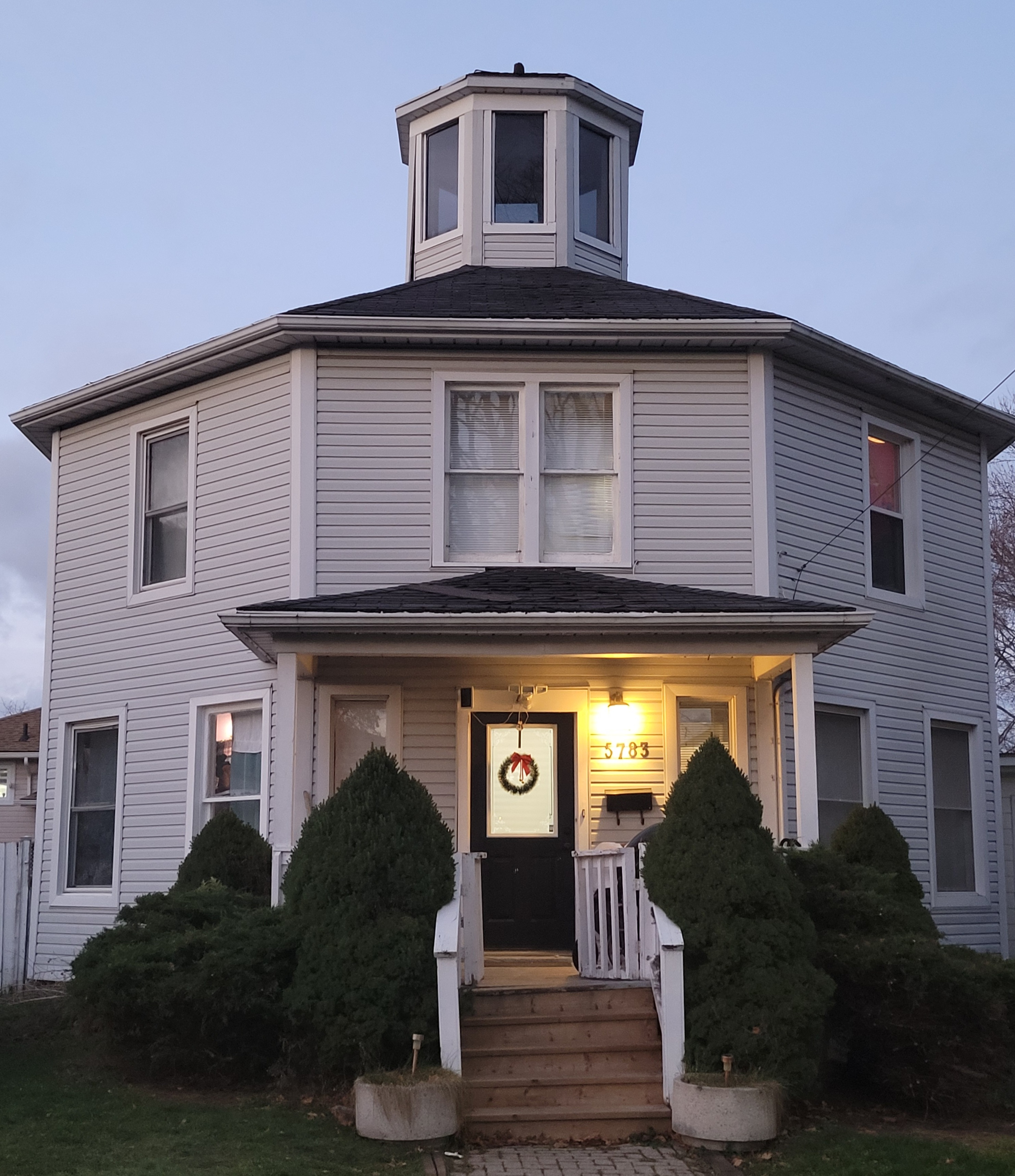
Bradley Octagon House, Niagara Falls, Ontario

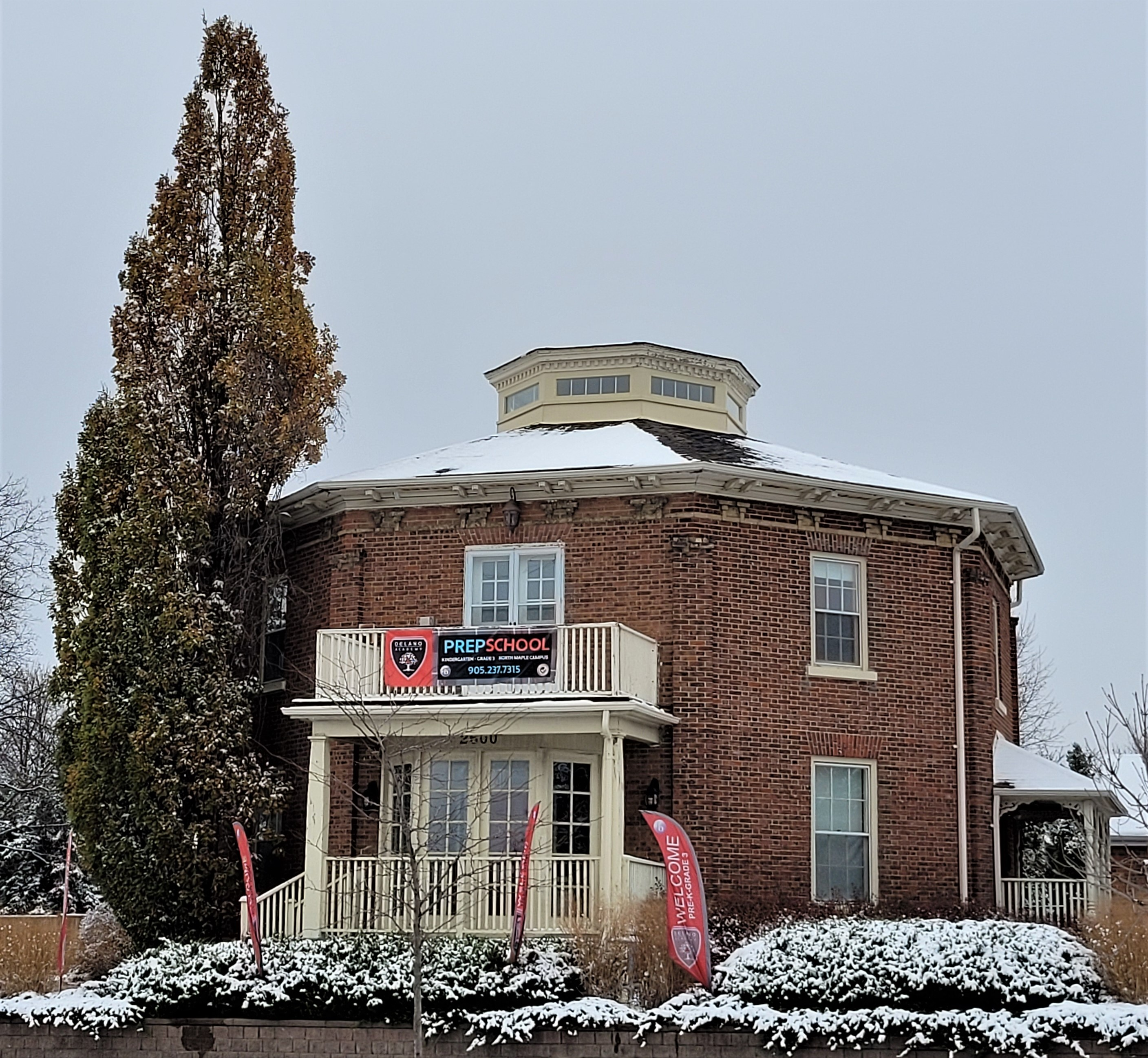
Rupert Octagonal House, Maple

== United States ==
Notable octagon houses in the U.S. include the following, more than 80 in number, in date built order. The octagonal outlines of these houses may be seen in Google maps and other satellite photo services, by zooming in from satellite view above, to their locations. Specifically, almost all of the following listed ones are mapped and may be observed via satellite view in the Google external link here (click on "Map of all coordinates" to the right). (Note: The Google external link provides a U.S. map showing the locations of 85 of the houses listed below. Not included are any houses for which latitude and longitude coordinates are not available. Zooming in, and switching to "Satellite View", you may observe the octagonal outline of the houses, exactly at, or very near to the flagged locations. For a few sites, however, Google does not provide satellite view coverage in sufficient detail.)

Of these, six are further designated National Historic Landmarks of the United States: Armour-Stiner House in the Hudson River valley in New York, which is perhaps the only domed octagon house in the world; The Octagon House in Washington, D.C. (which is actually more of a hexagon), where President Madison lived after the White House was burnt by the British; Thomas Jefferson's retreat Poplar Forest; May's Folly in Georgia; Samuel Sloan-designed Longwood in Natchez, Mississippi, still unfinished after its construction was halted by the American Civil War; and Waverley, also in Mississippi.

At least one of the houses has been claimed to have been used as "stations" sheltering escaped slaves on the Underground Railroad: the Octagon House in Fond du Lac, Wisconsin, although that claim has been disputed.

Including post-Civil War constructed houses, there are now at least 84 octagon houses that are listed on the National Register of Historic Places. (Note: That there are 84 NRHP octagon houses is documented by National Register reports identifying the below-listed properties as having "Octagon mode" architecture, or other indications of octagon house nature for these listed properties. Also, eight historic districts are noted to contain octagon houses as contributing properties, which may include others not listed here.)

Octagon houses were particularly popular in New York State. There were 120 octagon houses in New York State, of which 13 are listed on the National Register and listed below.

In 1958 Carl F. Schmidt published The Octagon Fad which attempted to inventory the Fowler-inspired homes, most of which were built prior to 1915 in North America. However, only a small fraction of the total are notable and extant.

New Jersey is believed to have had 46 octagon houses and octagon school houses, with 15 houses and one schoolhouse surviving in 2016.

House name	Image	Date built	Location	County or equivalent	State	Description
Poplar Forest	Poplar Forest, designed by Thomas Jefferson	1806	1548 Bateman Bridge Road, Forest, VA 24551 37.34826°N 79.26495°W	Lynchburg	VA	Retreat for, and designed by, Thomas Jefferson, NRHP
The Glebe (Arlington, Virginia)	The Glebe	1815	4527 17th St., N., Arlington; 38°53′30″N 77°7′4″W	Arlington	VA	NRHP
May's Folly	May's Folly, at 527 First Avenue	1829	527 1st Ave., Columbus, Georgia; 32°27′21″N 84°59′37″W	Muscogee	GA	NRHP
Waverley (West Point, Mississippi)		1840	West Point; 33°34′9″N 88°30′13″W	Clay	MS	NRHP
T. R. R. Cobb House	T. R. R. Cobb House	1842	194 Prince Ave., Athens; 33°57′40″N 83°22′54″W	Clarke	GA	NRHP
Yale-Cady Octagon House and Yale Lock Factory Site		1849	7550 N. Main St., Newport; 43°11′34″N 75°1′6″W	Herkimer	NY	NRHP
Rich-Twinn Octagon House		1849	145 Main Street, Akron; 43°1′19″N 78°29′44″W	Erie	NY	NRHP
Capt. Rodney J. Baxter House		1850	South and Pearl Sts., Barnstable; 41°39′0″N 70°17′6″W	Barnstable	MA	Only surviving house credited by NRHP to Orson Squire Fowler. Concrete walls. Property includes an octagonal carriage house as well.
Edward A. Brackett House		1850	290 Highland Ave., Winchester; 42°27′0″N 71°7′45″W	Middlesex	MA	NRHP
James Coolidge Octagon House		1850	7271 Main St., Madison 42°53′52.82″N 75°31′1.6″W	Madison	NY	Rare example of Octagon house that is also a cobblestone house.
Dubois-Sarles Octagon		1850	16 South St., Marlboro; 41°36′2″N 73°58′27″W	Ulster	NY	Rare octagon house with sidehall interior plan (NRHP)
Octagon Cottage (Rocky Hill, Kentucky)		1850	Near Rocky Hill; 36°58′10″N 86°2′44″W	Barren	KY	NRHP
Jacob Woodruff House		1850	610 Liberty Street Ripon; 43°50′52″N 88°50′49″W	Fond du Lac	WI	NRHP
Enoch Fuller House		1850	72 Pine St., Stoneham; 42°28′32″N 71°5′55″W	Middlesex	MA	NRHP
William Bryant Octagon House		1850	2 Spring Street, Stoneham; 42°28′54″N 71°5′40″W	Middlesex	MA	NRHP
Elias Crawford House		1851	3 Norwood St., Worcester; 42°15′10″N 71°49′9″W	Worcester	MA	NRHP
The Octagon		1852	297 East Perry Street, Tiffin; 41°7′0″N 83°10′5″W	Ohio	OH	NRHP
Octagon House (Danbury, Connecticut)		1852	21 Spring Street, Danbury; 41°23′42″N 73°27′34″W	Fairfield	CT	NRHP. Considered best example of style among Connecticut's remaining octagon houses.
2130 East Broad Street		1853	2130 East Broad Street, Bexley, Ohio; 39.9691°N 82.944°W	Franklin	OH	
Octagon House (Watertown, Wisconsin)		1853	919 Charles St., Watertown, Wisconsin; 43°11′5.03″N 88°42′27.31″W	Jefferson	WI	NRHP
Estabrook Octagon House		1853	8 River St., Hoosick Falls; 42°53′47″N 73°21′11″W	Rensselaer	NY	NRHP. One of the few remaining octagon houses built in strict compliance with Fowler's theories, other than the use of Rosendale cement.
Williams and Stancliff Octagon Houses		1853	26 and 28 Marlborough Street, Portland; 41°34′21″N 72°38′20″W	Middlesex	CT	Two octagon houses, side-by-side (Northern on pictured). NRHP
Denton Octagon House		1853	760 Castle Street, Geneva	Ontario	NY	(Not NRHP)
Charles Lawton House		1853	East side of the road at 416 S. Corey St. on NE corner of Corey & Washington Sts.Griggsville, IL	Griggsville	IL	Stucco over brick construction
John Gibbs House		1853	1038 Dark Moon Road, Johnsonburg; 40°58′07″N 74°52′05″W	Warren County	NJ	Gothic Revival. NRHP contributing property in Johnsonburg Historic District
Currier House (Almont, Michigan)	Currier Octagon House Almont, MI	1854	231 E St. Clair Street, Almont; 42°55′14″N 83°3′42″W	Lapeer	MI	Registered Michigan Historical Site and current offices of Four County Community Foundation
Clarence Darrow Octagon House		1854	8405 Main Street, Kinsman; 41°26′59″N 80°35′5″W	Trumbull	OH	Boyhood home of lawyer Clarence Darrow, made of chestnut logs and concrete. NRHP
Andrew Gildersleeve Octagonal Building		1854	Main Rd. and Love Lane, Mattituck; 40°59′28″N 72°31′25″W	Suffolk	NY	NRHP
Pressey House		1854	287 Summer St., Oakland; 44°32′28″N 69°43′30″W	Kennebec	ME	NRHP
Henry H. Smith/J.H. Murphy House		1854	512 E. 6th St., Davenport; 41°31′34″N 90°34′3″W	Scott	IA	NRHP
Garret Rickards House		1854	211 Cornelia St., Boonton; 40°54′23″N 74°24′32″W	Morris	NJ	Italianate. NRHP contributing property in Boonton Historic District
Nathaniel Myers House		1854	224 Cornelia St., Boonton; 40.906873°N 74.408953°W	Morris	NJ	Italianate, now rectory of St. John's Episcopal Church. NRHP contributing property in Boonton Historic District
Wildfell		1854	NW of Darlington on U.S. 1; 39°39′4″N 76°13′11″W	Harford	MD	NRHP
Hall-Crull Octagonal House		1855	North of Rushville; 39°44′39″N 85°23′10″W	Rush	IN	NRHP
Richard Barker Octagon House		1855	312 Plantation Street, Worcester; 42°16′11″N 71°46′16″W	Worcester	MA	NRHP
Capt. George Scott House		1855	Federal St., Wiscasset; 44°0′27″N 69°39′35″W	Lincoln	ME	NRHP
Jenkins Octagon House		1855	NY 395, Duanesburg; 42°45′31″N 74°11′7″W	Schenectady	NY	NRHP, designed and built by Alexander Delos "Boss" Jones
Inkwell (Lake Landing, North Carolina)		1855	E of Lake Landing at 30868 US 264, Lake Landing Township, Engelhard; 35°29′5″N 76°3′11″W	Hyde	NC	NRHP
Dr. Buck-Stevens House		1855	W. Main St., Brasher Falls; 44°48′27″N 74°46′32″W	St. Lawrence	NY	NRHP
Shute Octagon House		1855	McGuire School Road, Duanesburg; 42°46′28″N 74°13′10″W	Schenectady	NY	NRHP, designed and built by Alexander Delos "Boss" Jones
John S. Moffat House		1855	1004 3rd Street Hudson; 44°58′51″N 92°45′19″W	St. Croix	WI	NRHP
Sinnett Octagon House		1855	Muscatine; 41°27′11″N 91°1′50″W	Muscatine	IA	NRHP
Silas Field House		1855	63 Elmwood Ave.	Providence	RI	Built by "an aristocratic jeweler named Silas Field"
Miles B. Lawson House		1855	669 Public St	Providence	RI	
Frazier-Pressly House	1987 HABS photo	1856	Abbeville County; 34°04′55.7″N 82°18′07.9″W	Abbeville	SC	NRHP contributing property
Palmer-Gullickson Octagon House		1856	358 Leonard St., West Salem; 43°54′5″N 91°4′54″W	La Crosse	WI	NRHP
Deacon West Octagon House	On a Pewaukee morning	1856	370 High St., Pewaukee; 43°5′16″N 88°15′54″W	Waukesha	WI	NRHP
Langworthy House		1856	1095 W. 3rd St., Dubuque; 42°29′42″N 90°40′45″W	Dubuque	IA	NRHP
Lukens Pierce House		1856	NW of Ercildoun on Wilmington Rd., Ercildoun; 39°57′9″N 75°51′0″W	Chester	PA	NRHP
Octagon House (Fond du Lac, Wisconsin)		1856	276 Linden St., Fond du Lac; 43°46′15.97″N 88°26′54.03″W	Fond du Lac	WI	Claimed to be haunted, has passageways claimed to be "secret", and claimed to have been used as a safe house on the Underground Railway (although Underground Railway claim has been especially strongly disputed). NRHP
George F. Lee Octagon Houses		1856	South of Nebraska City; 40°34′19″N 95°48′10″W	Otoe	NE	NRHP
Wilcox Octagon House	Wilcox Octagon House in 2007	1856	5420 W. Genesee St., Camillus; 43°2′28″N 76°16′42″W	Onondaga	NY	Camillus Historical Society occupies it today. NRHP
Stephen Harnsberger House		1856	Holly Ave., Grottoes; 38°16′30″N 78°49′49″W	Rockingham	VA	NRHP
Abijah Thomas House		1856	SW of Marion on VA 657, Marion; 36°46′27″N 81°34′13″W	Smyth County	VA	NRHP
Hiram Smith House		1856	336 Main Street or 343 Smith Street, Neenah; 44°11′10″N 88°28′7″W	Winnebago	WI	NRHP
Edward Elderkin House		1856	127 S. Lincoln St., Elkhorn; 42°40′5″N 88°33′9″W	Walworth	WI	NRHP
James L. Lawther House		1857	927 W. 3rd St., Red Wing; 44°33′43″N 92°32′27″W	Goodhue	MN	NRHP
Feusier Octagon House		1857	1067 Green Street, San Francisco; 37.798543°N 122.416679°W	San Francisco	CA	NRHP
Albert S. Potter Octagon House		1857	4 Carolina Main Street, Richmond	Washington County	RI	NRHP contributing property (Carolina Village Historic District)
Wallingford Octagon House		ca. 1857	37 New Place Street, Wallingford	New Haven County	CT	Historic Buildings of CT
Norrish House		1858	West 2nd Street and Spring Street Hastings; 44°44′38.5″N 92°51′20″W	Dakota County	MN	NRHP contributing property
Hiram Ramsdell House		1858	High and Perham Sts., Farmington; 44°40′17″N 70°8′59″W	Franklin	ME	NRHP
Capt. Josiah E. Chase Octagon House		1858	Chase Mill Road, East Limington; 43°43′39″N 70°39′40″W	York	ME	NRHP
Prime-Octagon House		1859	41 Prime Ave., Huntington; 40°52′28″N 73°25′23″W	Suffolk	NY	NRHP
Timothy M. Younglove Octagon House		1859	8329 Pleasant Valley Road, Urbana; 42°24′17″N 77°14′37″W	Steuben	NY	NRHP
Zelotes Holmes House	1986 HABS photo	1859	619 East Main Street, Laurens, South Carolina; 34°29′57″N 82°0′5″W	Laurens	SC	Believed to be the first concrete house erected in South Carolina; NRHP
Gutherie Octagon House		1850s	Westland	Wayne	MI	Now part of The Westland Historic Village Park, the central portion of the house was built in the 1850s. The two wings were added in the 1930s. The Gutherie family was, and still is, in the lumber industry, which explains the use of Chinese Hemlock on the inside of the house.
Armour-Stiner House		1860	45 W. Clinton Ave., Irvington; 41.030803°N 73.870415°W	Westchester	NY	Also known as the Carmer Octagon House for 20th Century owner, noted writer Carl Carmer. It may be the only domed octagon house in the world. NRHP
David Van Gelder Octagon House		1860	47 Division St., Catskill; 42°13′4″N 73°52′26″W	Greene	NY	NRHP
Gen. Francis H. West House		1860	1410 17th Avenue Monroe; 42°35′53″N 89°38′15″W	Green	WI	NRHP
Octagon House (Barrington, Illinois)		1860	223 W. Main St., Barrington; 42°9′15.17″N 88°8′25.65″W	Cook	IL	NRHP
Octagon House (Reading, Massachusetts)		1860	97 Pleasant St., Reading; 42°31′26″N 71°6′3″W	Middlesex	MA	A Carpenter Gothic house that is also octagonal. NRHP
Wallace-Jagdfeld Octagon House		1860	171 Forest Ave., Fond du Lac; 43°46′44″N 88°27′13″W	Fond du Lac	WI	NRHP
Newton Homestead		1860	Ridge Rd., South Otselic; 42°39′4″N 75°47′8″W	Chenango	NY	NRHP
Charles Butler House (Franklin, Ohio)		1860	13 E. Jackson St., Franklin; 39°33′52″N 84°18′0″W	Warren	OH	NRHP
John Hosford House		1860	64 Sandusky St., Monroeville; 41°14′44″N 82°41′46″W	Huron	OH	NRHP
David Cummins Octagon House		1860	301 Liberty Street, Conneaut; 41°56′28″N 80°33′26″W	Ashtabula	OH	NRHP
Longwood (Natchez, Mississippi)		1860	Natchez; 31°32′12″N 91°24′17″W	Adams	MS	Antebellum mansion, interior unfinished as construction was suspended at outbreak of American Civil War. NRHP
Loren Andrus Octagon House	Photo taken in 1996	1860	57500 Van Dyke Street, Washington; 42°43′6″N 83°2′6″W	Macomb	MI	NRHP
Borden Farm Stable House		1860	621 May Road, Thompson; 41°48′48″N 75°29′3″W	Susquehanna	PA	Built as a stable, converted to a house.
Jeremiah Schellinger House		1860	1386 Lafayette Street, Cape May; 38°56′45″N 74°54′42″W	Cape May	NJ	Italianate. NRHP contributing property in Cape May Historic District
Octagon House (Westfield, Massachusetts)		1861	28 King Street, Westfield; 42°7′17″N 72°45′19″W	Hampden	MA	NRHP
Petty-Roberts-Beatty House		1859–61	103 N. Midway, Clayton; 31°52′43″N 85°26′58″W	Barbour	AL	NRHP. One of only two known to have been built in Alabama. The other, the Lane House, has been destroyed.
McElroy Octagon House		1861	2645 Gough Street, San Francisco; 37.797842°N 122.427328°W	San Francisco	CA	NRHP; Structural concrete construction
Octagon Hall		1862	Franklin, Kentucky vic. 36°48′25″N 86°33′25″W	Simpson	KY	NRHP-listed
Lyman White House		1862	127 N. Newcomb St.	Whitewater	WI	Small two-story frame octagonal house.
Nathan B. Devereaux Octagon House	The McElroy Octagon House in Gough St. Northfield Township, Michigan	1864	66425 Eight Mile Road, Northfield Township; 42°25′46″N 83°41′56″W	Washtenaw	MI	NRHP
The Pratt and Buckingham Octagon House	The Pratt and Buckingham octagon house	1865	99 Chestnut Street, Fredonia; 42°26′18″N 79°20′17″W	Chautauqua	NY	House and carriage house of concrete construction; house closely followed Fowler floor plans.
William Waterfield House		1867	308 3rd St., S., Raymond; 42°27′54″N 92°13′11″W	Black Hawk	IA	NRHP
Randall House		1870	5927 Treasurer Rd., Mayville; 43°20′22″N 83°19′20″W	Tuscola	MI	NRHP
Chickasaw Octagon House		1871	Court Street, Chickasaw Township; 43°2′11″N 92°29′58″W	Chickasaw	IA	NRHP
Nathanial Brittan Party House	Nathanial Brittan Party House	1872	125 Dale Avenue 37°30′02″N 122°16′15″W	San Carlos	CA	NRHP, Victorian-style, two-and-a-half story redwood framed structure with an octagonal folly.
Jane Ross Reeves Octagon House	Photographed in 2012	1879	400 Railroad Street, Shirley; 39°53′26″N 85°34′37″W	Hancock	IN	NRHP
Clapp Octagon House		1880	St. Augustine; 29.887346°N 81.288877°W	St. Johns	FL	(not NRHP)
Ezekiel B. Zimmerman Octagon House		1883	Near Marshallville; 40°55′22″N 81°45′47″W	Wayne	OH	NRHP
Dr. Nathan and Lula Cass House		1885	502 N. Travis Ave., Cameron; 30°50′44″N 96°58′38″W	Milam	TX	NRHP
Robert Waugh House		1886	202 School St., Sparland; 41°01.759′N 89°26.43′W	Marshall	IL	NRHP
Judge Henry L. Benson House		1892	137 High St., Klamath Falls; 42°13′25″N 121°47′7″W	Klamath	OR	NRHP
Longfellow-Hastings House		1893	Heritage Square; 3800 Homer St., Los Angeles; 34°05′17.5″N 118°12′30.7″W	Los Angeles	CA	NRHP Located at 85 S. Allen Ave., Pasadena at time of placement on NRHP; 34°8′40″N 118°6′45″W
Hattie O. and Henry Drake Octagon House		1893	605 3rd Street, SW, Huron; 44°21′49″N 98°13′26″W	Beadle	SD	NRHP
William H. McCreery House		1900	746 N. Washington Ave., Loveland; 40°23′57″N 105°4′10″W	Larimer	CO	NRHP
Arthur W. and Chloe B. Cole House		1901	5803 Rocky Branch Rd., Houston, Missouri; 37°15′42″N 92°1′58″W	Texas	MO	NRHP
George H. Gallup House		1901	703 S. Chestnut Street, Jefferson, Iowa	Greene	IA	NRHP, boyhood home of George Gallup
Hobbit House		1907	821 Lincoln Pl., Boulder, Colorado; 40°00′08.5″N 105°16′53.3″W	Boulder	CO	Built by brick mason Benjamin Franklin Gregg for Oliver and Mary DeMotte. Duplex with independent basement and main unit, 6 bedroom/4 bathroom underwent major remodel in 2019-20 after lengthy permitting process with the city of Boulder, preserving original stone foundation and footprint, exterior lines and features. Only octagon house in the state of Colorado. House was named by the 1st group of CU Boulder students to live there after the remodel, due to unusual semi-circle door and windows and inordinate number of stairs with low headers leading to basement.
Other C. Wamsley House		1909	200 N. 5th St., Hamilton; 46°14′54″N 114°9′37″W	Ravalli	MT	NRHP
Gallaher House		1914	600 12th St., Mansfield; 48°0′28″N 119°40′31″W	Douglas	WA	NRHP
Chemosphere		1960	Los Angeles	Los Angeles	CA	
The Ocho		1963	21 Cascade Walk; 37.75414°N 122.47009°W	San Francisco	CA	As briefly seen in Dirty Harry
Armory Revival Octagon House	Octagon House Providence RI built 1988	1988	68-76 Harrison St; 41°48′53.1″N 71°25′45.1″W	Providence	RI	4 Condominium duplex apartments with separate entrances. Located in the Broadway-Armory Historic District
			8273 Alloway Road, Lyons, New York	Wayne	NY	Rare cobblestone octagon house built originally at least partially as a blacksmith shop, per this source.

=== Notable former octagon houses ===
House name	Image	Date built	Location	County or equivalent	State	Description
Fowler's Folly		1853	Fishkill	Dutchess	NY	Octagonal home of Orson Squire Fowler, built 1848–1853, condemned as a public health hazard and dynamited in 1897.
Russell Octagon House		1859	Bloomfield	Davis	IA	NRHP; removed from NRHP in 1998 due to deterioration and lack of maintenance.
John Wood Octagonal House		1864	Quincy	Adams	IL	Built by the town's founder, John Wood, later the governor of Illinois, at a cost said of $200,000. Demolished in the 1950s or 1960s
Octagonal House		1875	Ames	Story	IA	Constructed in the 1870s, demolished in 1982. Namesake and original location of The Octagon Center for the Arts.
Octagon House (Stamford, Connecticut)		N.A.	120 Strawberry Hill Avenue, Stamford; 41°3′50.29″N 73°32′7.49″W	Fairfield	CT	NRHP; destroyed by fire in 1985.
Octagon house Fort Atkinson			Fort Atkinson	Jefferson	WI	Photo shows former existence.

== See also ==
- List of octagonal buildings and structures
