= Pressey =

Pressey is a surname. Notable people with the name include:

- Angela Pressey (born 1986), American volleyball player
- Paul Pressey (born 1958), American basketball player and coach
- Phil Pressey (born 1991), American basketball player
- Sidney L. Pressey (1888–1979), American professor of Psychology

== See also ==
- Pressey House, historic octagon house in Oakland, Maine
