= House at 26 Francis Avenue =

Historic house in Massachusetts, United States

- U.S. National Register of Historic Places
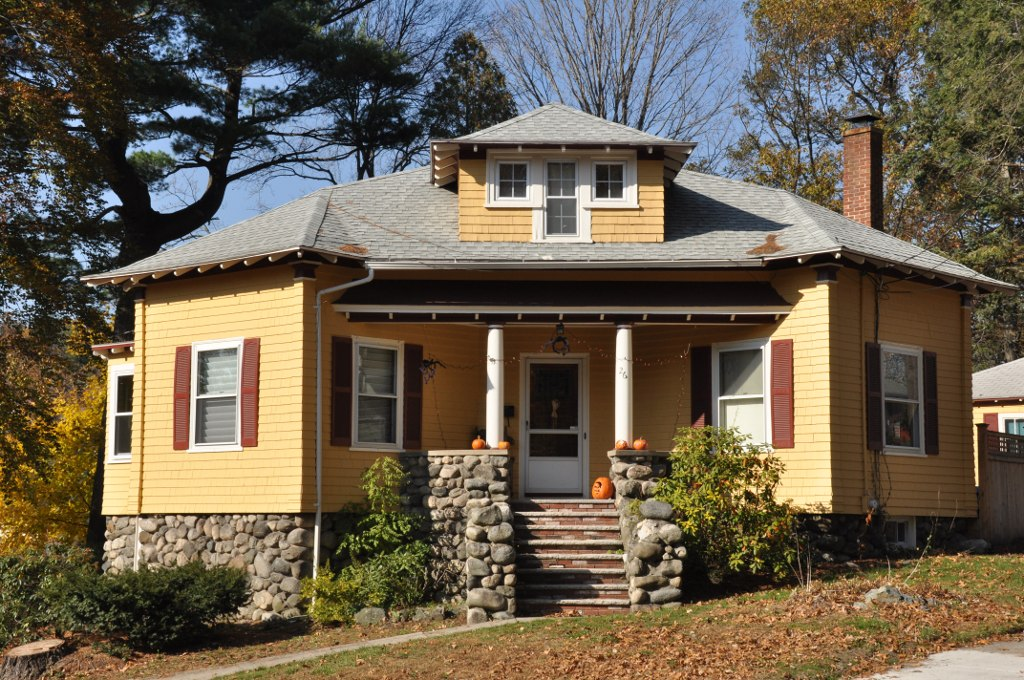

- Location within Massachusetts Location within the United States
- Location: 26 Francis Ave., Wakefield, Massachusetts
- Coordinates: 42°29′0″N 71°3′46″W
- Architectural style: Rational Revival
- MPS: Wakefield MRA
- NRHP reference No.: 89000701
- Added to NRHP: July 06, 1989

The House at 26 Francis Avenue in Wakefield, Massachusetts is a Colonial Revival octagon house. The shingle-clad wood-frame house rests on a high fieldstone foundation, is 2 stories at its rear and 1 1/2 in front, and has the appearance of a square house with four square sections projecting diagonally from each of its corners. The house has a Craftsman/Bungalow-style hip-roofed dormer with diamond-paned windows, and its main entrance is oriented diagonally toward the corner of Francis Avenue and Pine Street, under a porch supported by round columns.

The house was added to the National Register of Historic Places in 1989.

== See also ==
- List of octagon houses
- National Register of Historic Places listings in Wakefield, Massachusetts
- National Register of Historic Places listings in Middlesex County, Massachusetts
