= Octagon House (Reading, Massachusetts) =

Historic house in Massachusetts, United States

- U.S. National Register of Historic Places
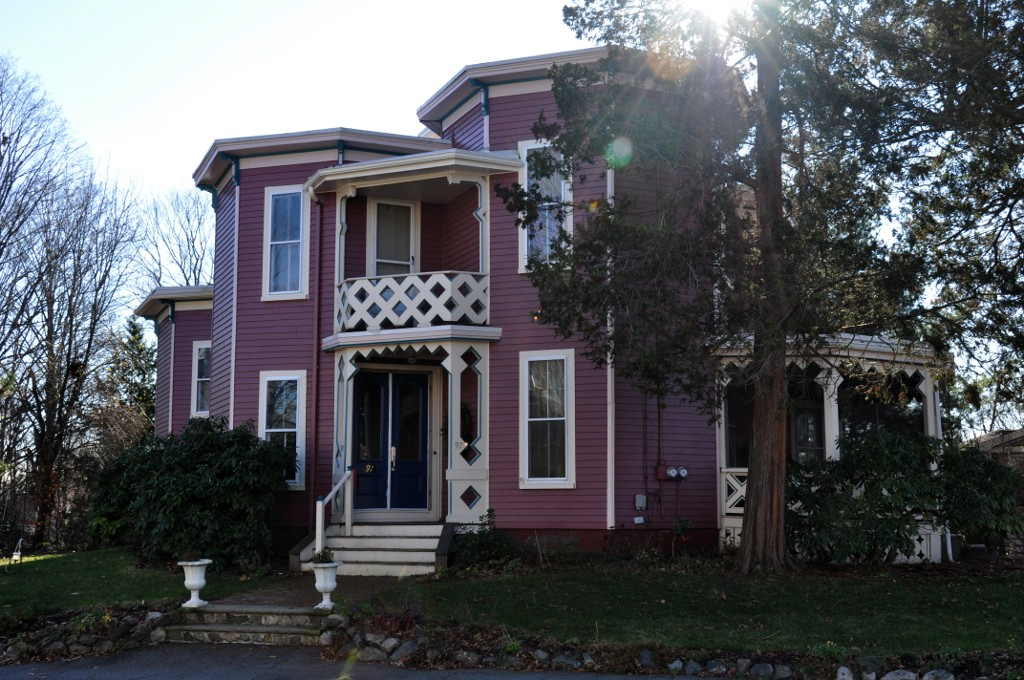

- Location within Massachusetts Location within the United States
- Location: 97 Pleasant St., Reading, Massachusetts
- Coordinates: 42°31′26″N 71°6′3″W
- Built: 1860
- Architectural style: Octagon Mode, Gothic Revival
- MPS: Reading MRA
- NRHP reference No.: 84002762
- Added to NRHP: July 19, 1984

The Octagon House (or the Dr. Horace Wakefield House) is a historic octagon house in Reading, Massachusetts. Built in 1860 by Doctor Horace Wakefield, it is a distinctive variant of the type, executed as a series of small octagonal shapes around a central cupola. The building is fashioned from large, heavy timbers in the manner of a log cabin, with long first-floor windows. The porches and eaves have heavy zigzag trim and brackets, some of which have carvings resembling gargoyles.

The house was listed on the National Register of Historic Places in 1984.

== See also ==
- List of octagon houses
- National Register of Historic Places listings in Reading, Massachusetts
- National Register of Historic Places listings in Middlesex County, Massachusetts
