= Fowler's Folly =

Former octagonal house in Fishkill, New York

Coordinates: 41°34′25″N 73°54′30″W

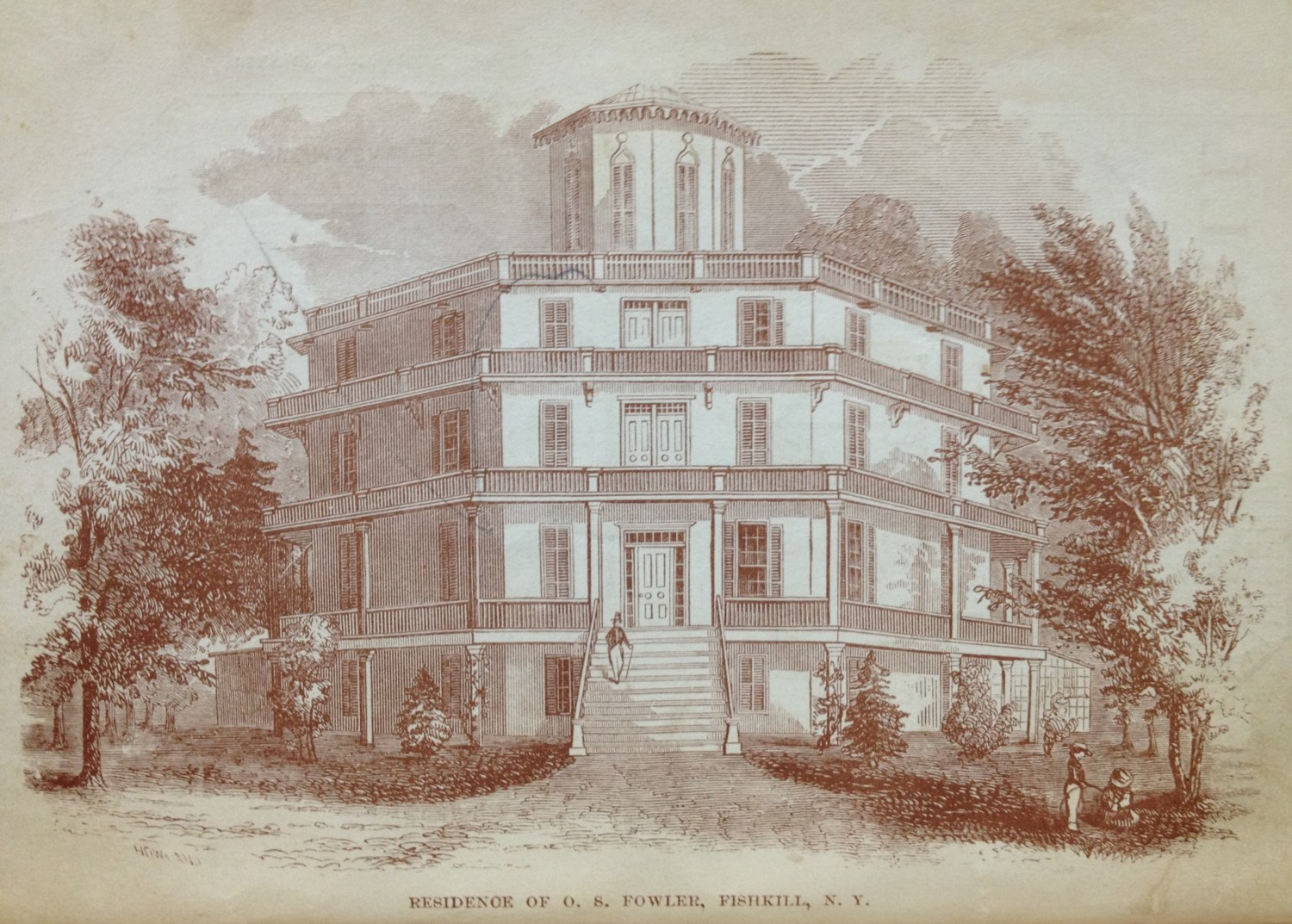
Lithograph of the Fowler Octagonal Mansion in Fishkill

Fowler's Folly, built during 1848–1853, was the octagonal home of Orson S. Fowler in Fishkill, New York. It was a "monumental" house for its time, with four stories and 60 rooms. The house was condemned as a public health hazard and dynamited in 1897.

Orson Squire Fowler was author of a book, The Octagon House: A House for All, that was first published in 1848. The book, frequently mischaracterized as a pattern book, ignited a fad for octagon houses in the United States and perhaps also in Canada.

== See also ==
- List of octagon houses
