= Capt. Rodney J. Baxter House =

Historic house in Massachusetts, United States

- U.S. National Register of Historic Places
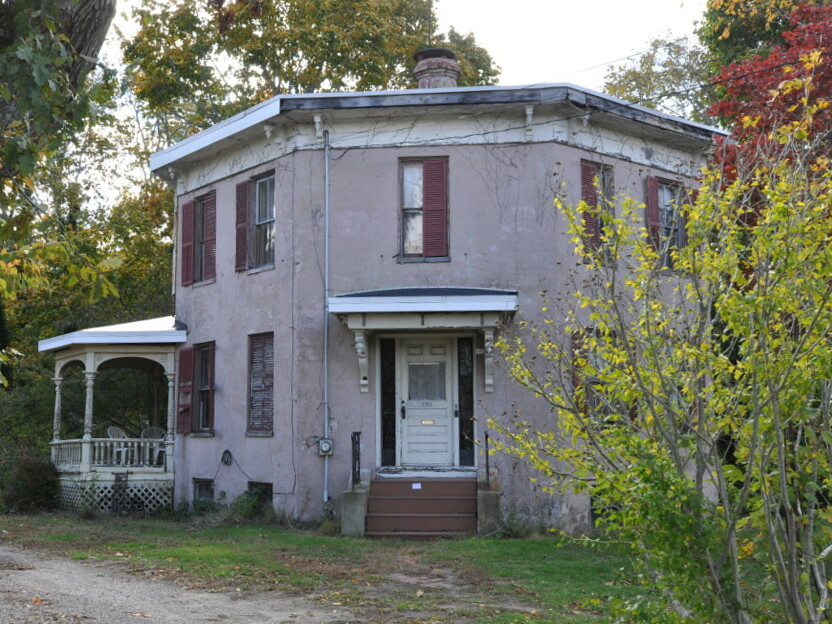

- Location within Cape Cod Location within Massachusetts Location within the United States
- Location: South and Pearl Sts., Barnstable, Massachusetts
- Coordinates: 41°39′0″N 70°17′6″W
- Area: 1.2 acres (0.49 ha)
- Built: 1850
- Architect: after Orson S. Fowler
- Architectural style: Octagon house
- MPS: Barnstable MRA
- NRHP reference No.: 87000273
- Added to NRHP: March 13, 1987

The Capt. Rodney J. Baxter House is an historic octagonal house at South and Pearl Streets in Barnstable, Massachusetts. Built in 1850, it is Barnstable's only example of an octagon house, built closely to designs advocated by Orson S. Fowler and briefly popular in the 1850s. It was listed on the National Register of Historic Places in 1987.

== Description and history ==
The Baxter House stands one block off the downtown area of the village of Hyannis, on the south side of South Street at its junction with Pearl Street. The house is located on the west side of its lot, with the smaller carriage house to the east. The house is two stories, with stuccoed concrete walls 18 inches (46 cm) thick, and a bracketed flat roof topped by an octagonal cupola. Two of its eight sides have entrances: the one facing the street is a simpler entrance sheltered by a bracketed hood, while that facing east is sheltered by a single-story porch extending across that facade, with a spindled balustrade and turned posts. Most of the other facades have two windows on each level; some have only one. The interior of each level has a central square chamber, around which are four smaller rectangular chambers, with the remaining triangular spaces used as closets. The carriage house, one story in height has a similar exterior finish and a smaller footprint, and is topped by smaller octagonal cupola. A two-leaf vehicle entrance is topped by a half-round fan; both the fan and the doors have strap woodwork decoration.

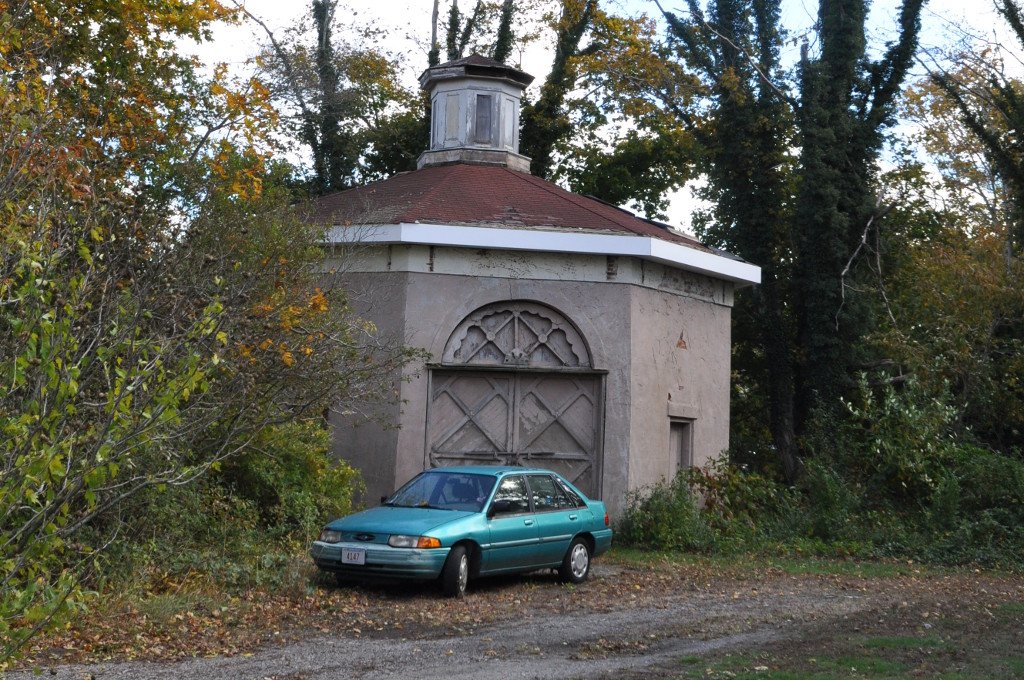
The octagonal carriage barn

The house was built about 1850 for Rodney J. Baxter, a sea captain engaged mainly in the transatlantic trade. The house was built according to principles articulated by Orson Squire Fowler in The Octagon House, A Home for All, which formed the basis for the designs of numerous similar houses across the country. The house closely follows Fowler's guidelines, including the use of concrete for the walls. At the time of its listing on the National Register in 1987, it was still owned by Baxter's descendants.

== See also ==
- National Register of Historic Places listings in Barnstable, Massachusetts
- List of octagon houses
