= Richard Barker Octagon House =

Historic house in Massachusetts, United States

- U.S. National Register of Historic Places
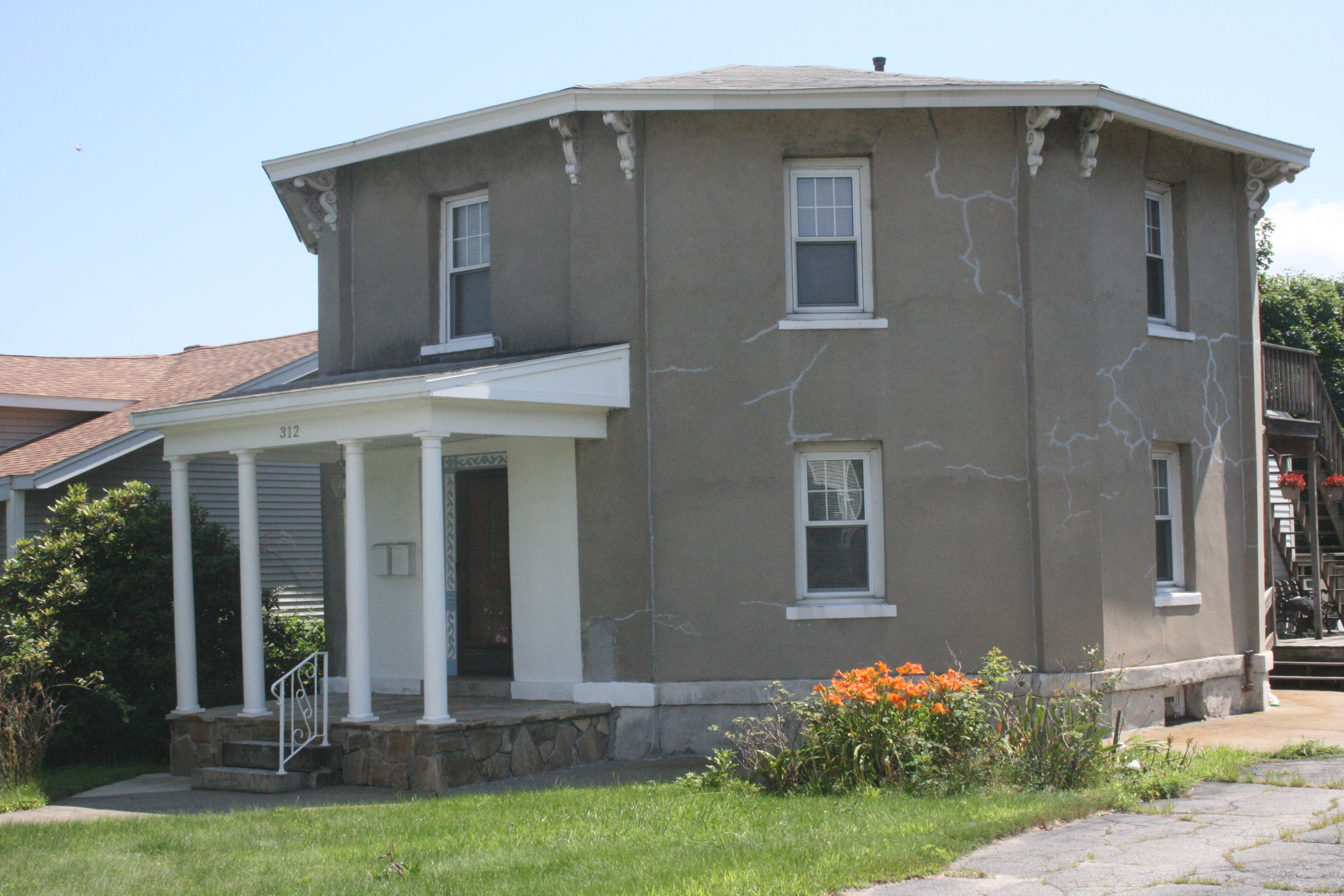

- Location within Massachusetts Location within the United States
- Location: 312 Plantation Street, Worcester, Massachusetts
- Coordinates: 42°16′11″N 71°46′16″W
- Built: 1855
- Architectural style: Octagon Mode
- MPS: Worcester MRA
- NRHP reference No.: 80000592
- Added to NRHP: March 5, 1980

The Richard Barker Octagon House is a historic octagon house located in Worcester, Massachusetts. Built sometime between 1855 and 1865, during a brief period in their popularity, it is one of two octagon houses in the city, and a relatively rare instance of one built using Orson Squire Fowler's recommended gravel wall technique. On March 5, 1980, it was added to the National Register of Historic Places.

== Description and history ==
The Barker Octagon House is set on Worcester's east side, on the east side of Plantation Street a short way south of Massachusetts Route 9. The house is two stories in height, with a low-pitch octagonal hip roof with a deep eave supported by paired decorative brackets. The walls are finished in stucco, and it has simple pilasters at the corners, giving the wall faces a paneled appearance. A Colonial Revival porch shelters the front entry, its four Tuscan columns supporting a shed roof. The building at one time had an octagonal cupola at the top, but this has been removed.

The house was built during the brief period between about 1848 and 1865, when octagon houses were popularized by the works of Orson Squire Fowler. This house is particularly unusual, in that its wall construction may follow one of Fowler's recommendations, using gravel stone chips; most octagon houses were built using then-standard wood-frame construction methods. The first documented owner was Richard Barker, a carpenter, who purchased the house in 1866, when the craze was already dying out.

== See also ==
- List of octagon houses
- National Register of Historic Places listings in eastern Worcester, Massachusetts
