= Octagon House (Danbury, Connecticut) =

Historic house in Connecticut, United States

- U.S. National Register of Historic Places
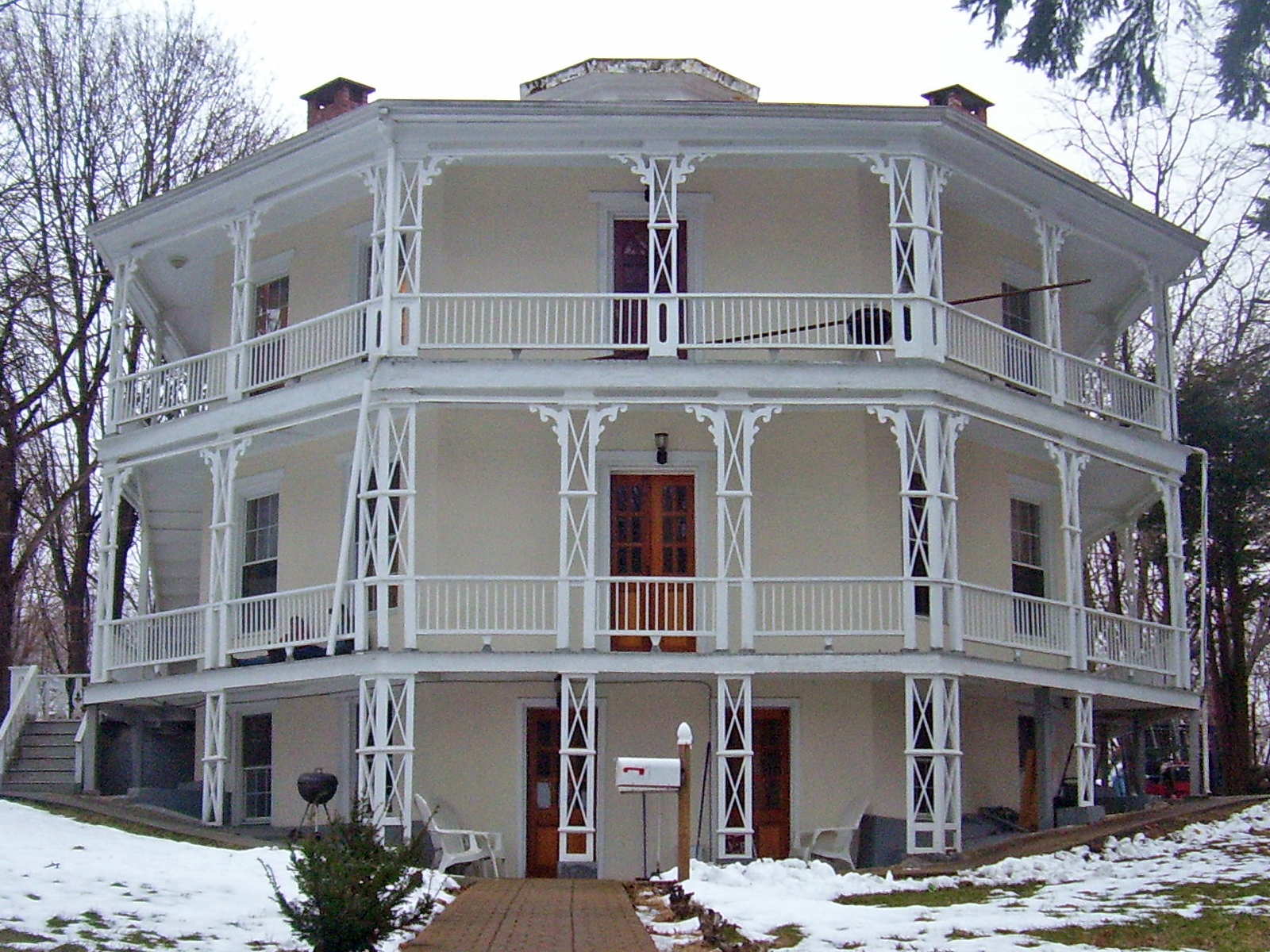
- Southern (front) facets, 2008

- Location within Connecticut Location within the United States
- Location: 21 Spring Street, Danbury, CT
- Coordinates: 41°23′41″N 73°27′32″W
- Built: 1852
- NRHP reference No.: 73001945
- Added to NRHP: May 7, 1973

The Octagon House is a historic octagon house at 21 Spring Street in Danbury, Connecticut, United States. It is considered the best octagon house of those that survive in Connecticut. In 1973 it was added to the National Register of Historic Places to avert its demolition in urban renewal.

It is west of downtown Danbury in a residential area approximately midway along Spring between Beaver and New streets. The house itself is set back further from the street than its neighbors. It is a three-story building of one-foot–thick (30.5 cm) concrete walls faced in stucco. An octagonal cupola rises from the center of the almost flat roof, with two brick chimneys rising from the exterior walls at the southwest and southeast facets.

Verandas with cast iron railings and supports run around the upper stories. The wide roof eaves, both on the main house and the cupola, have scroll brackets. The ornate ironwork of the verandas contrasts with the simple wooden door and window surrounds.

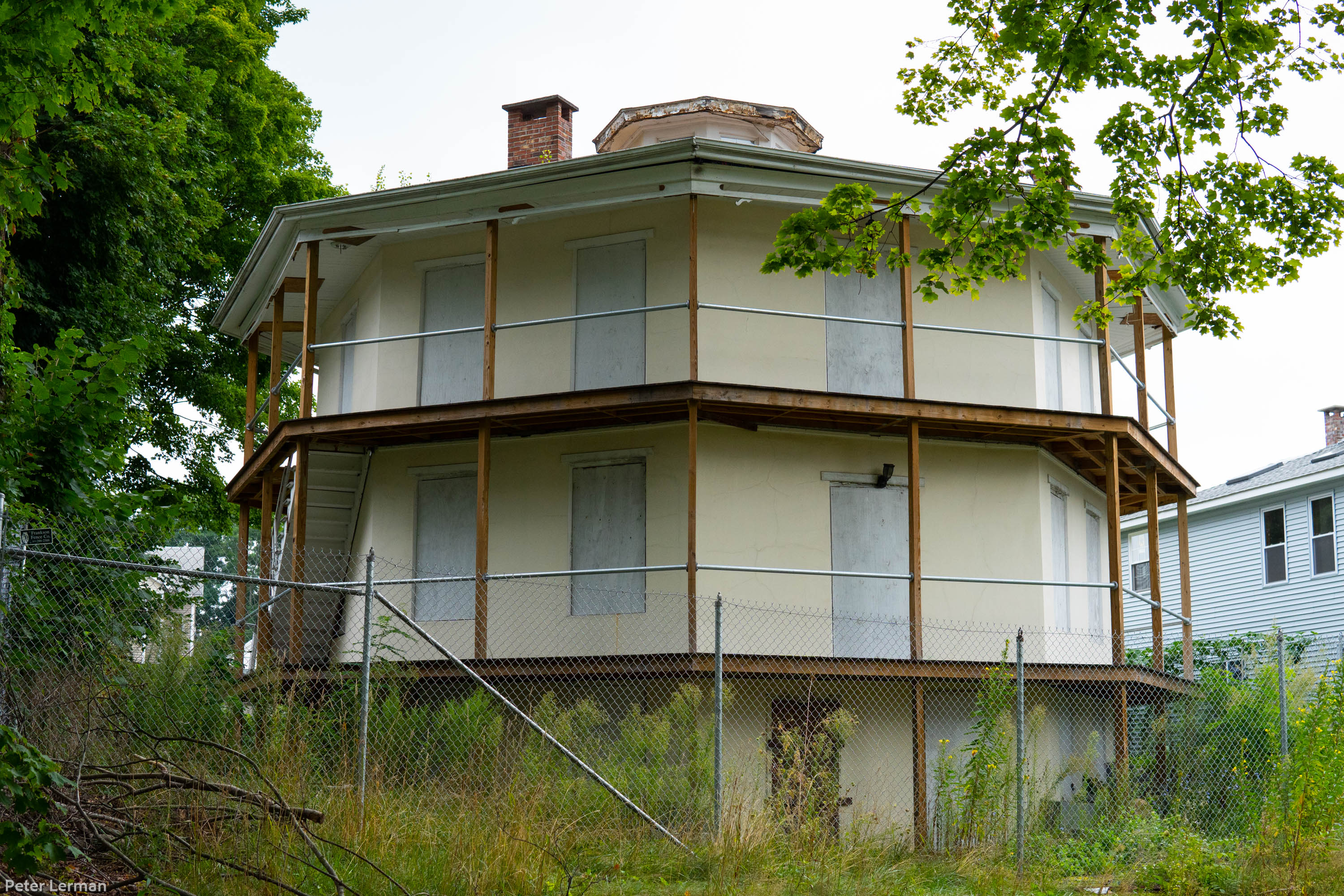
Octagon House, Danbury, CT - August 2021

The house was built in 1852 by Daniel Starr. He was following closely the precepts of octagon houses laid out by Orson Squire Fowler in his book A Home for All, all the way to the use of concrete as the main structural material. At the time of its construction Spring Street did not exist, so it fronted on Elm Street to the north. It has been well-maintained and preserved throughout its existence, even after its partition into apartments.

== See also ==
- List of octagon houses
- National Register of Historic Places listings in Fairfield County, Connecticut
