= Woodchester Villa =

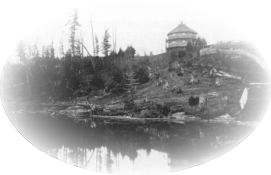

- Location within Ontario

General information
- Architectural style: Octagon Mode
- Location: 15 King St, Bracebridge, Ontario, Canada
- Coordinates: 45.039961°N 79.305045°W
- Completed: 1882
- Client: Henry J. Bird

Ontario Heritage Act
- Type: Provincial Heritage Easement Property
- Designated: 1981-03-16
- Reference no.: HPON07-0048

Woodchester Villa, also known as The Bird House or "The Bird Cage", is a historic octagon house located at 15 King Street overlooking the Muskoka River in Bracebridge, Ontario. It was built in 1882 and was the home of woolen manufacturer Henry J. Bird. Its walls alternate between 4.5 metres and 5 metres in width and are made of 16 inch-thick poured concrete. In 1977 the Bracebridge Rotary Club took steps to preserve the property by buying it from the descendants of Henry J. Bird. After restoring the building, it was turned over to the Town of Bracebridge on March 13, 1980. On June 22, 1980, it was opened as a local history museum. The museum closed in 2009 after a winter storm caused damage to the building. In 2012, another series of restorations began, upgrading both the grounds and the building. After much consideration, Woodchester Villa was reopened in June, 2018 as 'Woodchester, Where Events Take Shape'. People can now use the building for meetings, private functions and events.

It is protected by an Ontario Heritage Trust heritage conservation easement and is subject to a municipal heritage designation by the Town of Bracebridge.

== Affiliations ==
The Museum is affiliated with: CMA, CHIN, and Virtual Museum of Canada.

== See also ==
- List of octagon houses
