= Clapp Octagon House =

Historic house in St. Augustine, Florida, US

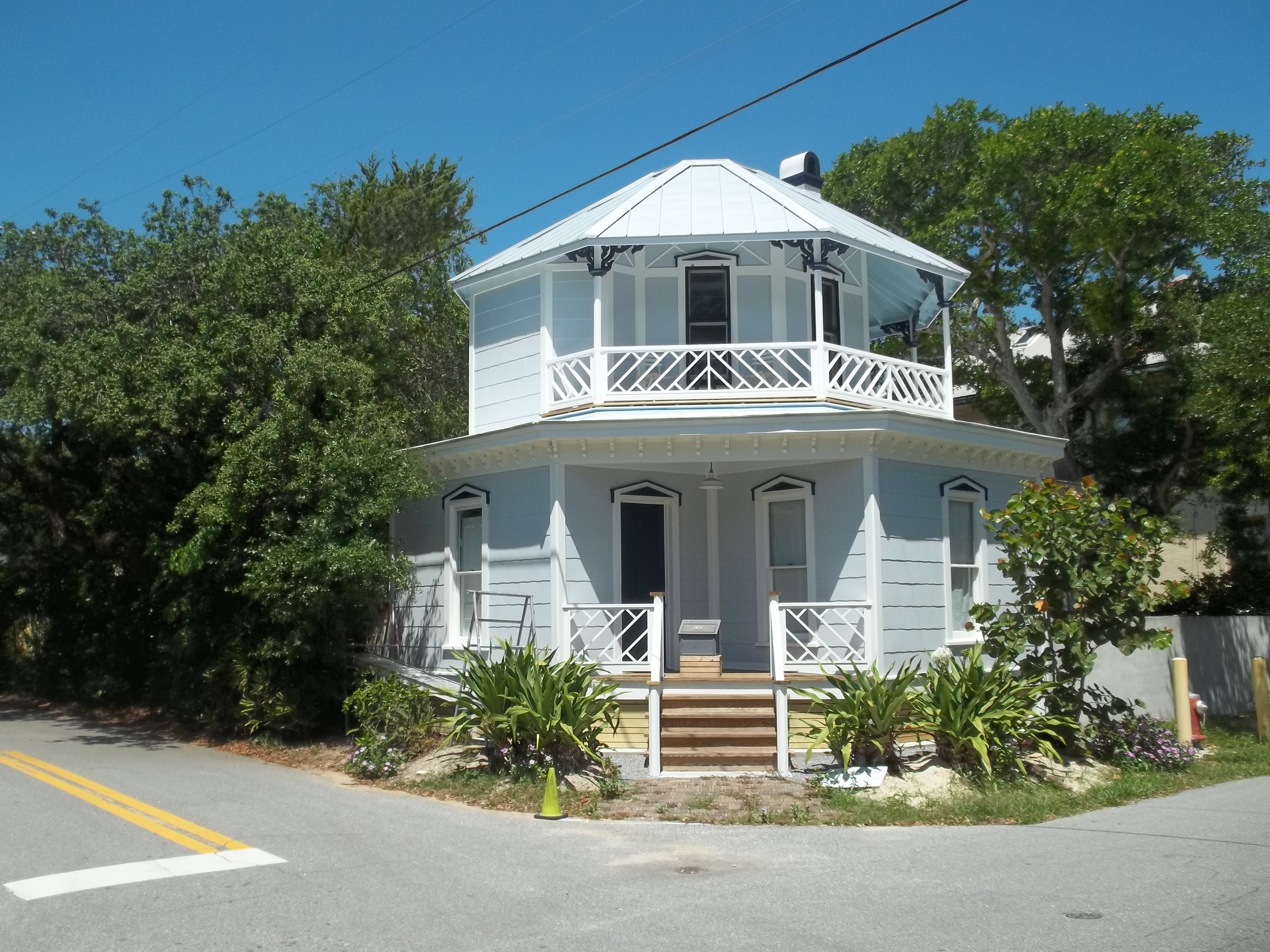
- Interactive map of the Clapp Octagon House area

General information
- Architectural style: Octagon mode
- Location: St. Augustine, Florida, United States
- Coordinates: 29.887346°N 81.288877°W
- Completed: 1886
- Client: Rollin N. Clapp

The Clapp Octagon House is an historic octagonal house located at 62 Lighthouse Avenue in the historic Lighthouse Park neighborhood on the north end of Anastasia Island in St. Augustine, Florida. It was built in 1886 for Rollin N. Clapp of St. Louis, Missouri.

It is the only classic surviving octagon house in St. Augustine. It has been called: "One of St. Augustine's most important residential buildings."

Later residents include: Mary Antin, author of The Promised Land; Norman MacLeish, artist and brother of Pulitzer Prizewinning poet and Librarian of Congress Archibald MacLeish; and Lea Wells, the first female architect in St. Augustine.

In 1989, it was listed as the Octagon House in A Guide to Florida's Historic Architecture prepared by the Florida Association of the American Institute of Architects and published by the University of Florida Press.

It would have been one of some 30 Contributing properties in the Lighthouse Park Historic District which was proposed in 1993 to the St. Augustine city commission for listing on the National Register of Historic Places, but which was turned down by the commission because of the vehement opposition of some residents, who feared that the district would develop into an historic preservation zoning district, as had some of the historic districts on the mainland in St. Augustine.

An extensive history of the building was written in 1980 by David Nolan, who worked on the official 1978-1980 survey of historic buildings in St. Augustine. A short listing on the house appeared in his book The Houses of St. Augustine in 1995.

== See also ==
- List of octagon houses
- St. Augustine Lighthouse, a NRHP listed property in the proposed Lighthouse Park Historic District
