= Octagon Cottage (Rocky Hill, Kentucky) =

Historic house in Kentucky, United States

- U.S. National Register of Historic Places
- Interactive map of Octagon Cottage
- Nearest city: Rocky Hill, Kentucky
- Coordinates: 36°58′10″N 86°2′44″W
- Built: 1850
- Architect: Edmunds, W. H.
- Architectural style: Octagon Mode
- MPS: Barren County MRA
- NRHP reference No.: 83002540
- Added to NRHP: July 20, 1983

Octagon Cottage is an octagon house in rural Barren County, Kentucky, near Rocky Hill, Kentucky.

It was listed on the U.S. National Register of Historic Places in 1983. It once had four octagonal outbuildings; only one, an office, survived when the property was listed.
