= Octagon House (Westfield, Massachusetts) =

Historic house in Massachusetts, United States

- U.S. National Register of Historic Places
- U.S. Historic district – Contributing property
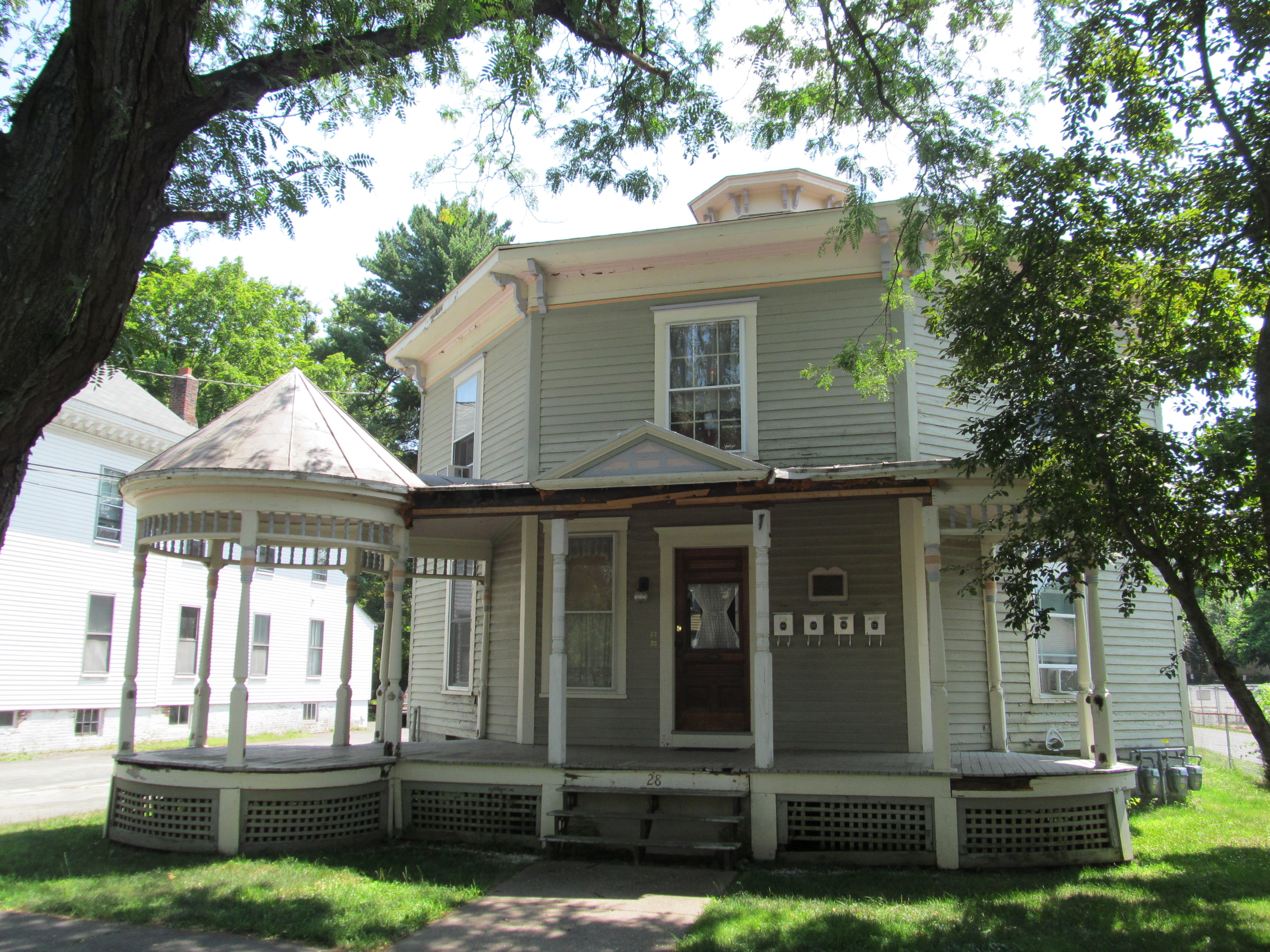
- Octagon House

- Location within Massachusetts Location within the United States
- Location: 28 King Street, Westfield, Massachusetts
- Coordinates: 42°7′17″N 72°45′19″W
- Built: 1861
- Architectural style: Octagon Mode
- Part of: Westfield Center Historic District (ID13000441)
- NRHP reference No.: 82004967

Significant dates
- Added to NRHP: April 1, 1982
- Designated CP: June 25, 2013

The Octagon House is an historic octagonal house located at 28 King Street in Westfield, Massachusetts. It was built sometime between 1858 and 1864 by Joseph Watson, and is the only one of three 19th-century octagon houses built in the city to survive. The house was listed on the National Register of Historic Places in 1982, and included as part of expansion of the Westfield Center Historic District in 2013.

== Description and history ==
The Octagon House is located behind Westfield's City Hall, on the south side of King Street between King Avenue and Hampden Street. It is a two-story eight-sided structure with a hip roof and a central eight-sided cupola. A two-story rectangular ell with a gabled roof extends to the rear, and a single-story porch extends across portions of the front, formerly ending with an octagonal pavilion on the left. The pavilion has since been removed. The porch decoration is Queen Anne in style, with delicate turned posts and a spindled valance. The main roof line is adorned by carved brackets at the corners. Most faces of the octagonal section have a single window on each floor. The interior follows a plan typical for these buildings, with a central spiral staircase leading all the way up to the cupola, with chambers on the outside walls.

The house was built by Joseph Watson, and was one of three octagon houses built in the community during the period when the published works of Orson Squire Fowler led to a fad in their construction. The ell was added in the 1870s and the porch in the 1890s. A prominent resident of the house was Albert Steiger, who founded Steiger's, a regionally prominent department store chain.

== See also ==
- National Register of Historic Places listings in Hampden County, Massachusetts
- List of octagon houses
