= Bradley Octagon House =

Coordinates: 43.09155°N 79.090748°W

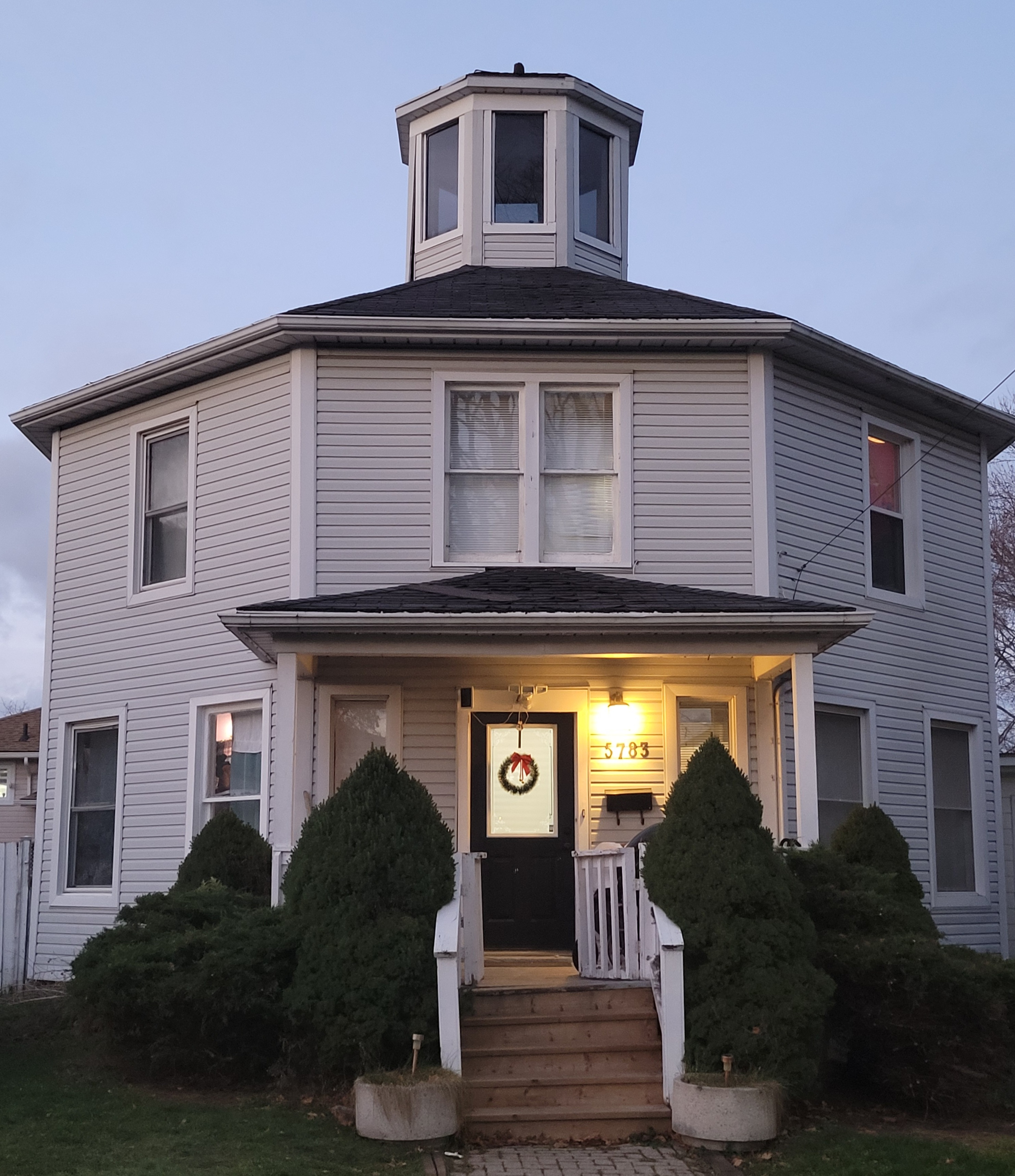
- Interactive map of the Bradley Octagon House area

General information
- Architectural style: Octagon Mode. 2-storey. frame
- Location: 5783 Summer St, Niagara Falls, Ontario, Canada
- Construction started: 1905
- Completed: 1906
- Client: James Parker

Design and construction
- Engineer: unknown
- Main contractor: James Parker

The Bradley Octagon House, also called the Parker Octagon House or the James Parker Octagon House, is an historic octagon house located at 5783 Summer Street in Niagara Falls, Ontario, Canada.

It was built in 1906 by James Bradley, a carpenter, and it remained in his family until sold by his granddaughter Joyce Bradley in 1989. It is two storey with an octagonal cupola centered on its roof and a one-storey porch on the street side. Its original wooden siding was covered first by insulbrick and then by the present vinyl siding. It is listed as a heritage property by the city of Niagara Falls although it has not been officially designated as such.

== See also ==
- List of octagon houses
