= Chickasaw Octagon House =

Historic house in Iowa, United States

- U.S. National Register of Historic Places
- Location within Iowa Location within the United States
- Location: Canal St., Chickasaw Township, Iowa
- Coordinates: 43°2′11″N 92°29′58″W
- Area: 2 acres (0.81 ha)
- Built: 1871
- Architect: Cyrus Stocks
- NRHP reference No.: 79000888
- Added to NRHP: July 17, 1979

The Chickasaw Octagon House (also known as the Johnny Stocks Octagon House) is a historic octagonal house located on Court Street in the ghost town of Chickasaw which is located in Chickasaw Township, in Chickasaw County, Iowa.

== Description and history ==
The construction of the house is attributed to Cyrus (Johnny) Stocks. The first floor was completed in 1871 and the second floor was completed three years later. The house is built of limestone quarried locally, and set in a random ashlar pattern. It is located in a rural area that was platted as the town of Chickasaw.

The house was added to the National Register of Historic Places on July 17, 1979.
