= Pressey House =

Historic house in Maine, United States

- U.S. National Register of Historic Places
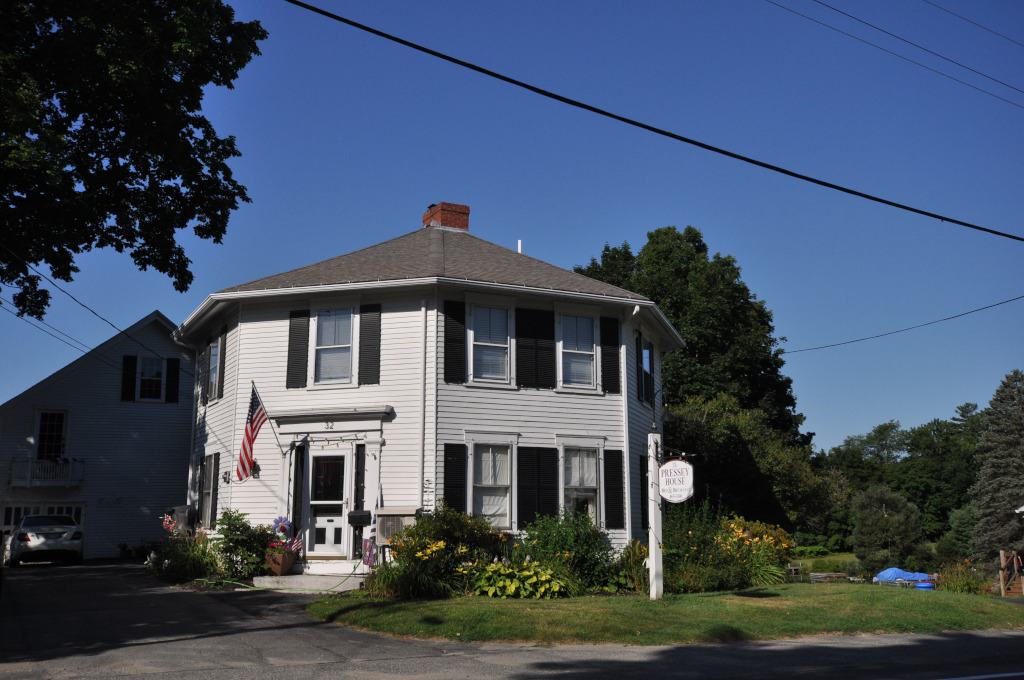

- Location within Maine Location within the United States
- Location: 32 Belgrade Rd., Oakland, Maine
- Coordinates: 44°32′28″N 69°43′30″W
- Built: 1854
- Architectural style: Greek Revival, Octagon Mode
- NRHP reference No.: 77000072
- Added to NRHP: September 15, 1977

The Pressey House is a historic octagon house in Oakland, Maine. Built in 1855, it is one of a small number of octagon houses in the state and one of the only ones with Greek Revival styling. It was listed on the National Register of Historic Places in 1977. It houses a bed and breakfast inn.

== Description and history ==
The Pressey House is in Oakland's village center on the south side of Belgrade Road (Maine State Route 11), overlooking the northernmost tip of Messalonskee Lake. Its main block is a two-story wood-frame octagon, from which an ell extends to the rear, joining it to a barn. All parts are finished in wooden clapboards and rest on a granite-block foundation. The street-facing front facade has pairs of sash windows on each floor, while most of the remaining sides have single sash windows. The main entrance is in the angled side just left of the front facade, is flanked by sidelight windows and Doric pilasters, and is topped by an entablature and cornice.

The house was built sometime between 1854 and 1858 by H.T. Pressey, inspired by the works of Orson Squire Fowler, who promoted the design and construction of octagonal houses, which were a fad for about thirty years. Since many were built later in the period of the fad, they tend to have Italianate or Late Victorian features; this one, built during the earlier years of the fad, is unusual for having Greek Revival features.

== See also ==
- List of octagon houses
- National Register of Historic Places listings in Kennebec County, Maine
