= Capt. Josiah E. Chase Octagon House =

Historic house in Maine, United States

- U.S. National Register of Historic Places
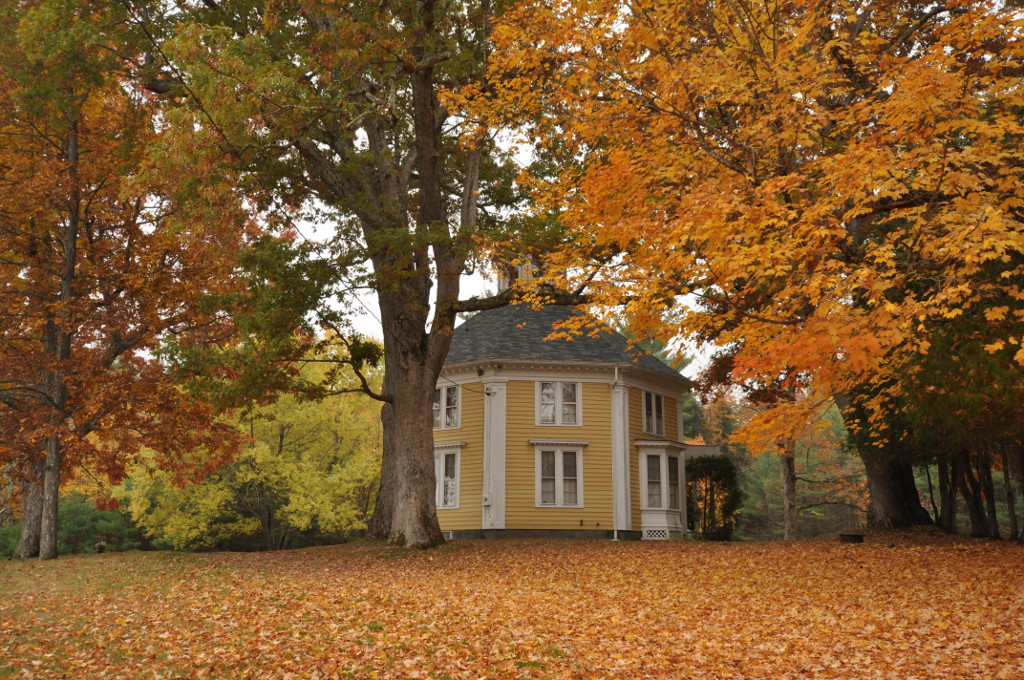

- Location within Maine Location within the United States
- Nearest city: Chase Mill Road, East Limington, Maine
- Coordinates: 43°43′39″N 70°39′40″W
- Area: 3 acres (1.2 ha)
- Built: 1858
- Architectural style: Octagon Mode
- NRHP reference No.: 87000431
- Added to NRHP: March 25, 1987

The Capt. Josiah E. Chase Octagon House is an historic octagon house on Chase Mill Road in East Limington, Maine. Built about 1858, it is one of twelve houses of the type known to survive in the state from the period of its greatest popularity, and is one of the least-altered. The house was listed on the National Register of Historic Places in 1987. Its builder, Josiah Chase, was a seafaring ship's captain.

== Description and history ==
The Chase Octagon House is set amid oak trees on a knoll near the confluence of the Little Ossipee River with the Saco River on the east side of Limington, Maine. It is a two-story wood-frame structure, with an octagonal roof that is topped by a cupola. The eight sides are roughly equal in size, and are finished with clapboards. The entrance faces west, away from the rivers, and consists of a heavy door flanked by narrow sidelight windows and pilasters. There is photographic evidence that a more elaborate porch once sheltered the entry. The building corners have paneled pilasters, and fenestration generally consist of paired narrow sash windows; there are several projecting single-story bay windows. The octagonal cupola features small windows with segmented-arch lintels. The interior has had some alteration, principally the removal of several walls to create larger spaces, and the closing off of an entry into the kitchen space. The upstairs originally had seven triangular chambers; one wall was removed to create a larger chamber. A period carriage barn stands near the house.

Limington's Chase family is descended from Deacon Amos Chase, who is reputed to be the town's first white settler. Josiah E. Chase's father owned a sawmill on the river nearby; he began a life at sea at the age of 18 aboard a whaling ship. He acquired the land for this house in 1858 (from James Madison Chase, of unknown relation), and built the house soon afterward. The house belonged to his descendants until 1971.

== See also ==
- National Register of Historic Places listings in York County, Maine
