= Rich-Twinn Octagon House =

Historic house in New York, United States

- U.S. National Register of Historic Places
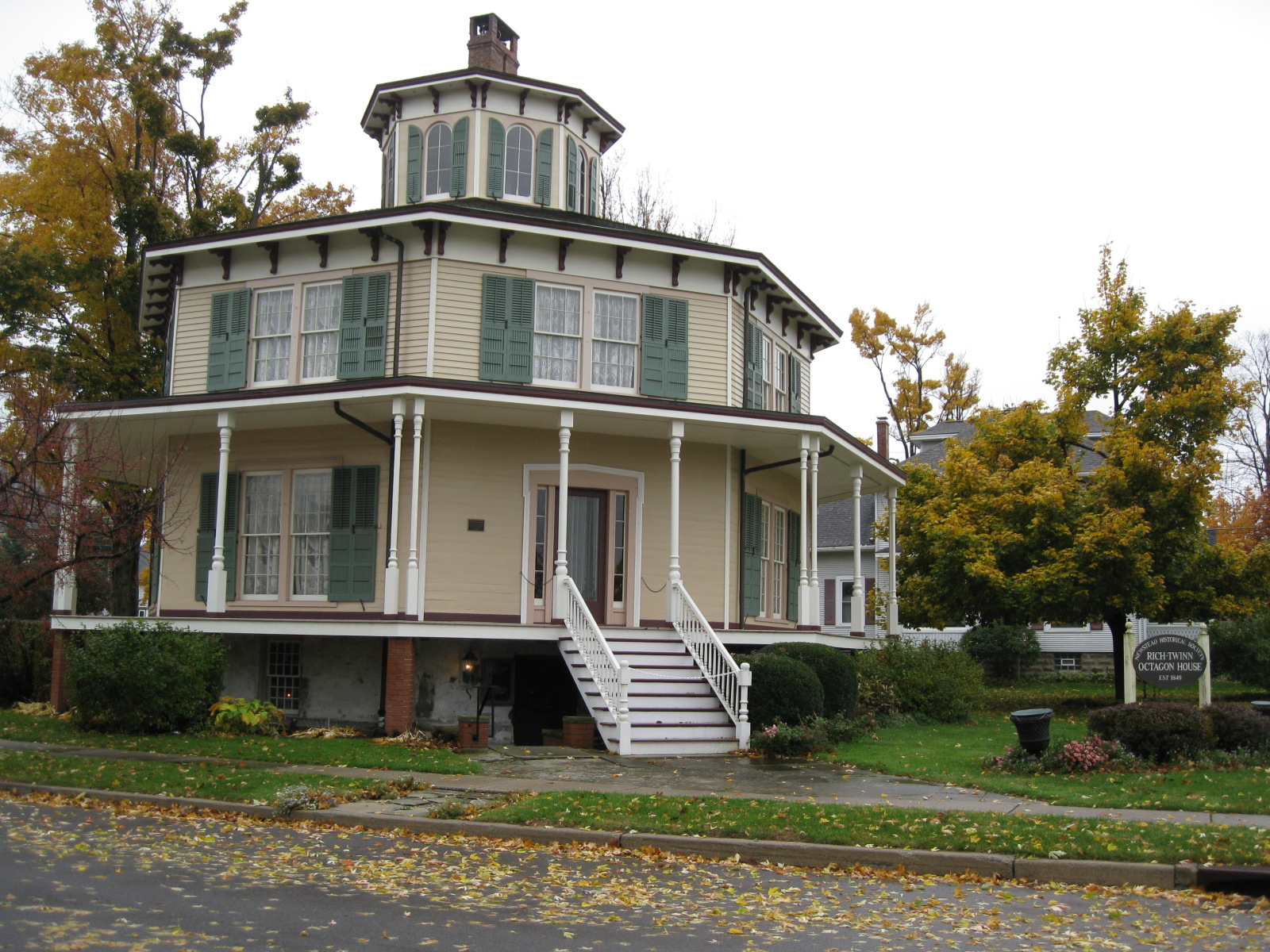
- Rich-Twinn Octagon House, October 2009

- Location within New York Location within the United States
- Interactive map showing the location of Rich-Twinn Octagon House
- Location: 145 Main Street, Akron, New York
- Coordinates: 43°1′19″N 78°29′44″W
- Built: 1849
- Architectural style: Italianate: Octagon Mode
- NRHP reference No.: 95000050
- Added to NRHP: February 10, 1995

The Rich-Twinn Octagon House built in 1849 is an historic octagonal house located at 145 Main Street in Akron, New York. It is one of three known octagon houses in Erie County, New York and was "meticulously restored" prior to its 1994 nomination to the National Register.

On February 10, 1995, it was added to the National Register of Historic Places. Today it is a house museum and is occasionally open for touring.
