= James L. Lawther House =

Historic house in Minnesota, United States

- U.S. National Register of Historic Places
- U.S. Historic district – Contributing property
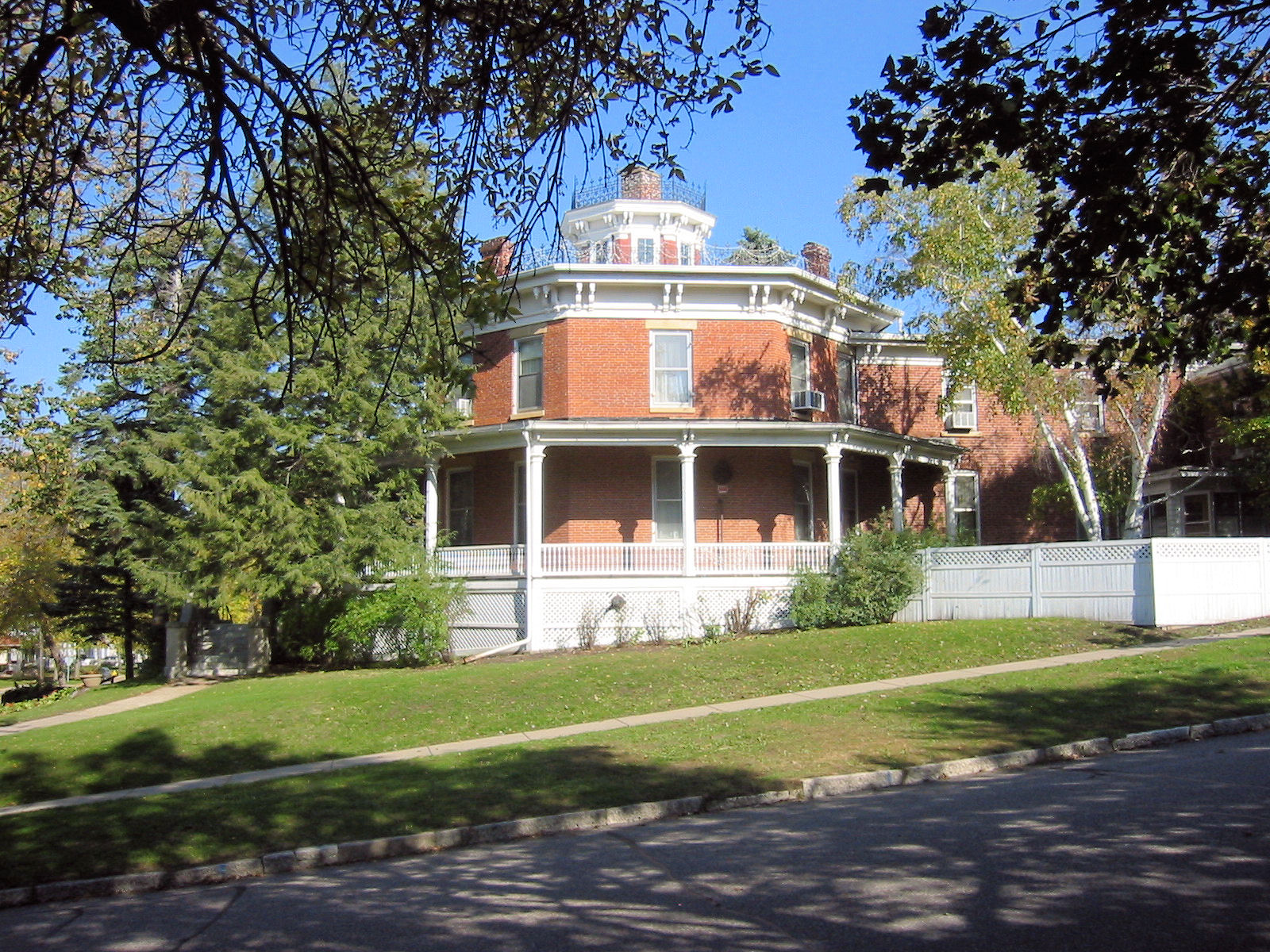

- Location within Minnesota Location within the United States
- Interactive map showing the location of James L. Lawther House
- Location: 927 W. 3rd St., Red Wing, Minnesota
- Coordinates: 44°33′44″N 92°32′25″W
- Built: 1857
- Architectural style: Octagon Mode
- Part of: Red Wing Residential Historic District (ID82002955)
- NRHP reference No.: 75000982
- Added to NRHP: May 21, 1975

The James L. Lawther House is an octagon house in Red Wing, Minnesota, United States. The owner, James Lawther, built it after he visited Dubuque, Iowa and toured the Langworthy House there. At the time, the Langworthy House was the grandest house of its type on the upper Mississippi River. The Lawther House was built in 1857, with an addition in 1870. Its location, at the corner of Third and Hill Streets, has been termed "one of the most architecturally significant intersections in Minnesota" and is part of the Red Wing Residential Historic District. It is listed on the National Register of Historic Places.

James Lawther was a successful businessman and merchant in Red Wing. Besides the house, he built the Gladstone Building in downtown. He also contributed to civic causes such as the Carnegie-Lawther Library, the YMCA, and the park on Barn Bluff. The Gladstone Building is listed on the National Register, and the library is a contributing property to the Red Wing Mall Historic District.

Now serving as a bed and breakfast, the all-brick home features an ornate cupola and central chimney.
