= Jacob Woodruff House =

Historic house in Wisconsin, United States

- U.S. National Register of Historic Places
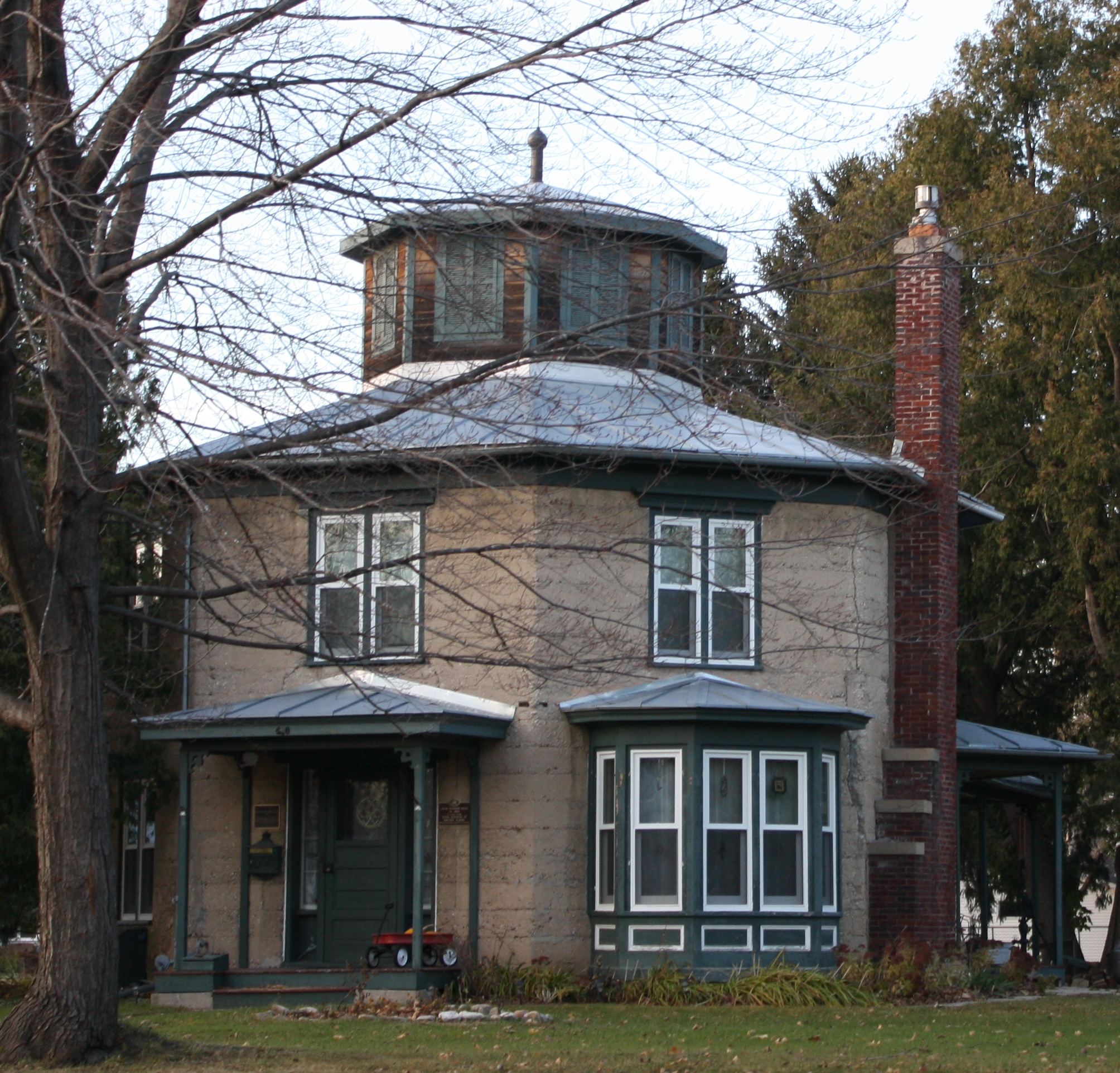

- Location within Wisconsin Location within the United States
- Location: 610 Liberty Street Ripon, Wisconsin
- Coordinates: 43°50′52″N 88°50′49″W
- Built: 1850
- Architectural style: Octagon Mode
- NRHP reference No.: 74000090
- Added to NRHP: December 30, 1974

The Jacob Woodruff House is a two-story octagonal house constructed of concrete walls, featuring a large, windowed cupola, and metal roof. It is located in Ripon in the U.S. state of Wisconsin, and is listed on the National Register of Historic Places. Jacob Woodruff was a member of and the librarian for the Wisconsin Phalanx in 1846, a communal society based on the philosophy of Charles Fourier, a French socialist.
