= Hiram Smith House =

Historic house in Wisconsin, United States

- U.S. National Register of Historic Places
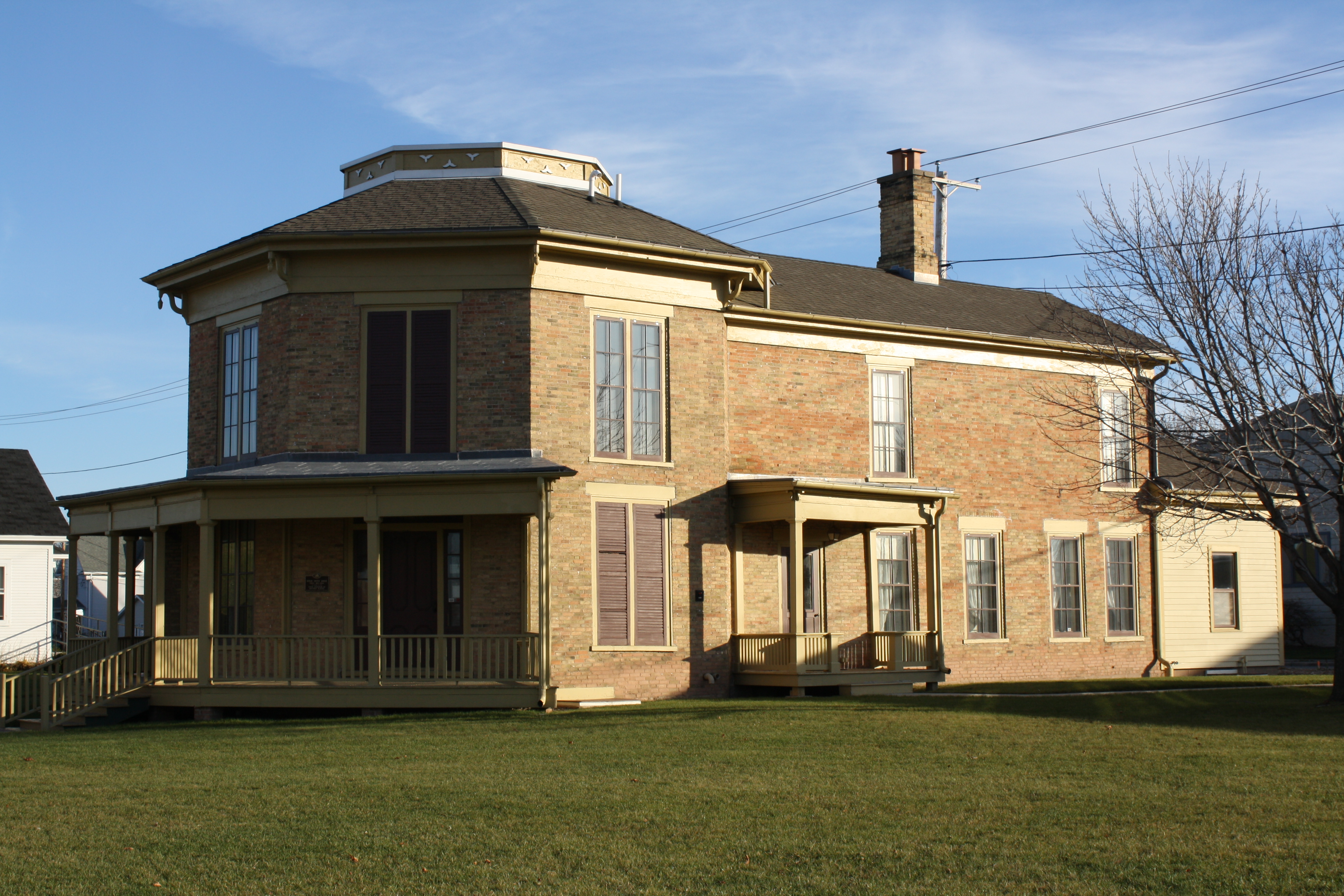
- Front of the Hiram Smith house

- Location within Wisconsin Location within the United States
- Location: 343 Smith Street, Neenah, Wisconsin
- Coordinates: 44°11′10″N 88°28′7″W
- Built: c. 1856
- Architectural style: Octagon Mode
- NRHP reference No.: 96000990
- Added to NRHP: September 6, 1996

The Hiram Smith House is a buff brick, two-story octagonal house located in Neenah in the U.S. state of Wisconsin. The home features a porch on three sides. It was owned by Hiram Smith. The home is listed on the National Register of Historic Places.

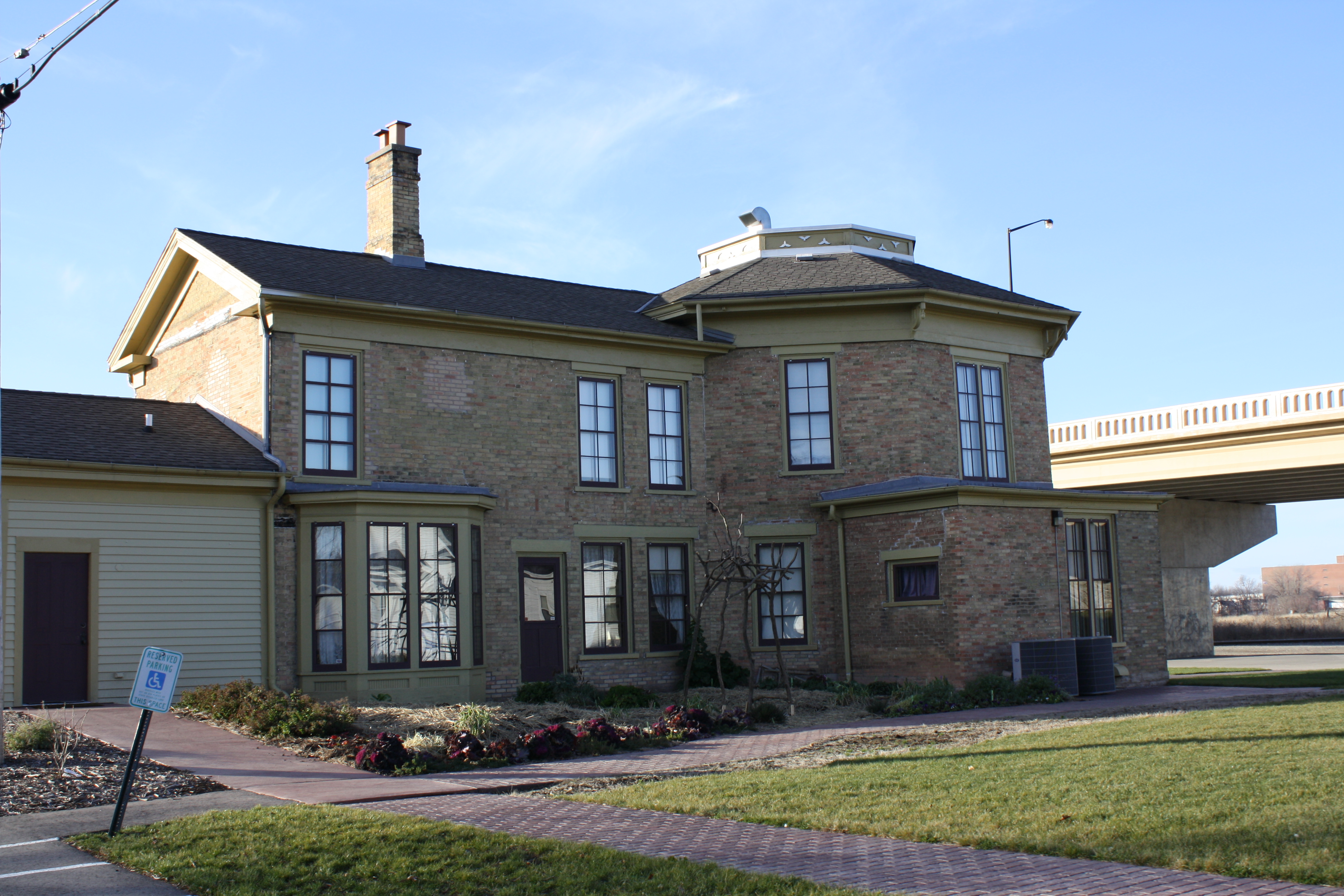
Rear
