= Sinnett Octagon House =

Historic house in Iowa, United States

- U.S. National Register of Historic Places
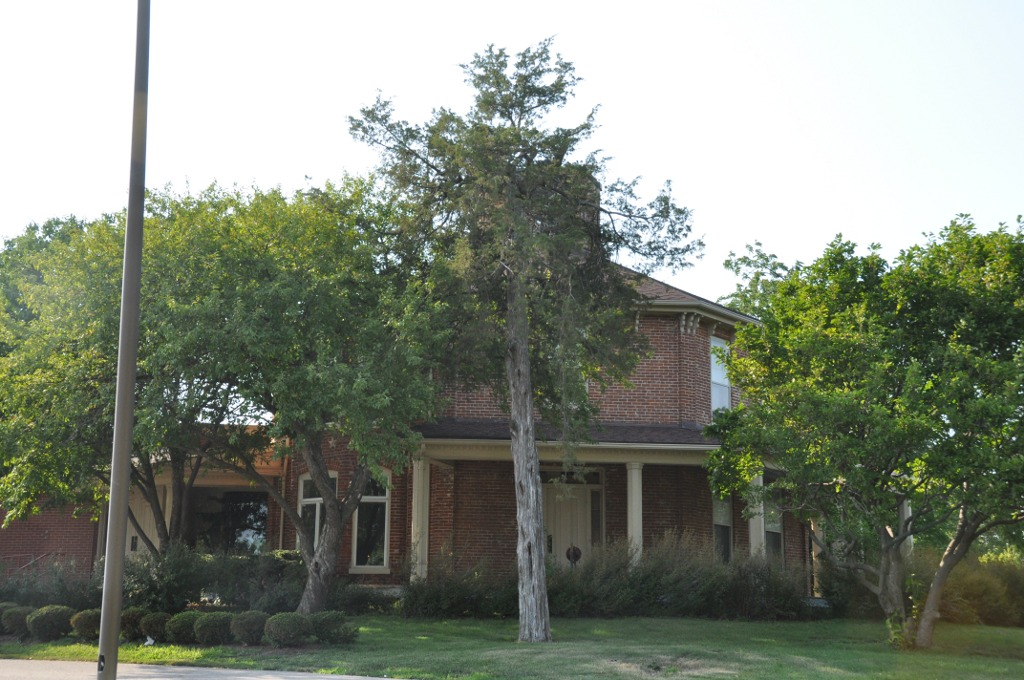

- Location within Iowa Location within the United States
- Nearest city: Muscatine, Iowa
- Coordinates: 41°27′11″N 91°1′50″W
- Built: 1855
- Architectural style: Greek Revival, Octagon Mode, Italian Villa
- NRHP reference No.: 74000802
- Added to NRHP: July 18, 1974

The Sinnett Octagon House built in 1855 is a historic octagonal house in Muscatine, Iowa. The two-story brick home with wrap-around porch and windowed cupola is now used as an office building.

On July 18, 1974, it was added to the National Register of Historic Places.
