= Deacon West Octagon House =

Historic house in Wisconsin, United States

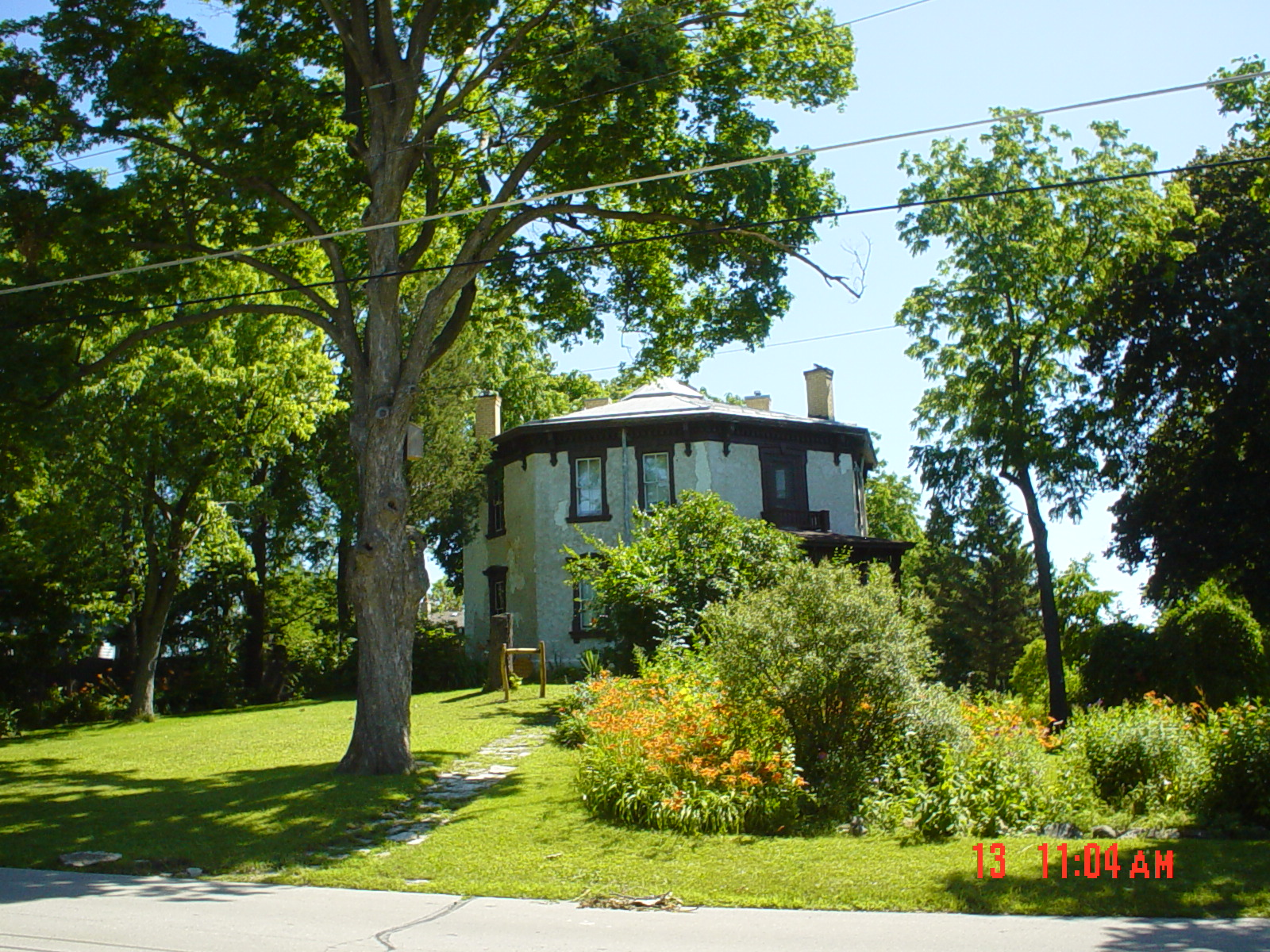
- Deacon West Octagon House On a Pewaukee morning
- U.S. National Register of Historic Places
- Location within Wisconsin Location within the United States
- Location: 370 High St., Pewaukee, Wisconsin
- Coordinates: 43°5′16″N 88°15′54″W
- Built: 1856
- Architect: West, Deacon
- Architectural style: Octagon Mode, Italianate
- NRHP reference No.: 75000083
- Added to NRHP: May 12, 1975

The Deacon West Octagon House, built in 1856 (1854) by Deacon Josiah West, is an historic eleven-room octagon house located at 370 High Street, in Pewaukee, Wisconsin, United States. The wooden sign posted in front of the house states, "Josiah West 1854 Octagon House." It is only one of 19 such structures in the state.

Deacon West was a blacksmith in Pewaukee. Octagon houses (and barns) were a brief fad started in the 1850s, claiming to use less building material and less fuel to heat than conventional rectangular floorplans. West built his house on top of the only hill in Pewaukee - three stories tall, with walls of grout - an early form of concrete - covered with plaster. The roof was low-pitched and hipped.

West sold the house to Ira Rowe in 1866, and around 1873 it was partially destroyed by fire, but its strong 18-inch-thick (460 mm) cement walls remained standing. In 1873 Col. N. P. Inglehart of Kentucky bought the house and rebuilt it more or less in its present form, with the Italianate-styled window frames and bracketed eaves, which were popular by the 1870s, but probably not the original 1850s ornamentation. The roof was crowned with a belvedere, allowing a better view of the lake, village, and the countryside, but it was destroyed in a windstorm in the early 1900s. The house passed through several owners until Margaret Ann Kirley sold the house to her son and current owner, Jeffrey D. Kirley in 1998. It features stucco covered walls and a metal peak in lieu of a cupola.

On May 12, 1975, it was added to the National Register of Historic Places.
