= Ezekiel B. Zimmerman Octagon House =

Historic house in Ohio, United States

- Zimmerman Bury Octagon House
- U.S. National Register of Historic Places
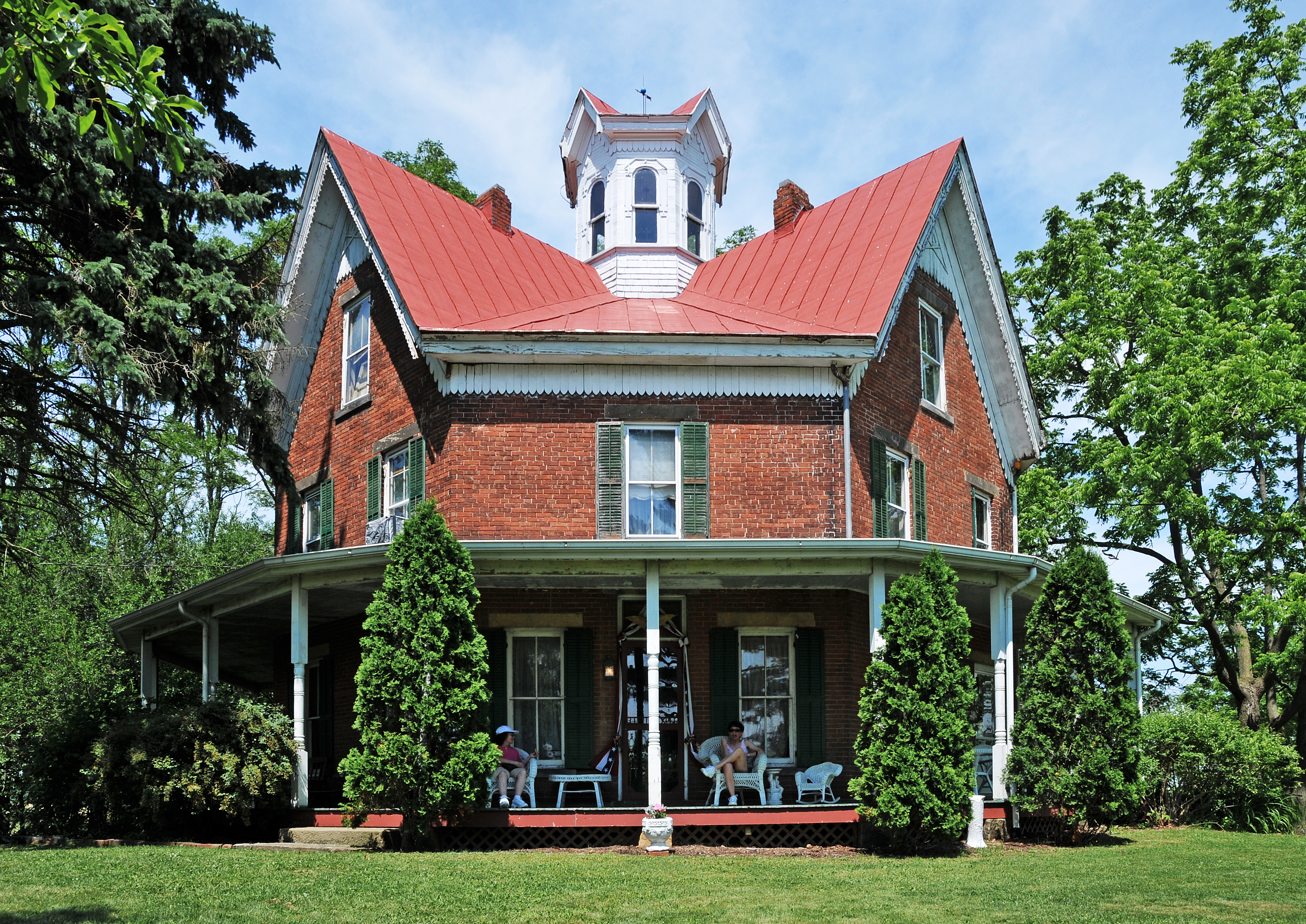

- Location within Ohio Location within the United States
- Nearest city: Marshallville, Ohio
- Coordinates: 40°55′22″N 81°45′47″W
- Built: 1883
- Architect: Ezekiel B. Zimmerman
- Architectural style: Combination Queen Anne and Steamboat Gothic, Octagon Mode
- NRHP reference No.: 75001553
- Added to NRHP: May 28, 1975

The Zimmerman Bury Octagon House is an historic octagonal house located in Marshallville, Ohio. It was built in 1883 by Ezekiel B. Zimmerman.

On May 28, 1975, it was added to the National Register of Historic Places.

== See also ==
- List of Registered Historic Places in Ohio, Wayne County
