= Gallaher House =

Historic house in Washington, United States

- U.S. National Register of Historic Places
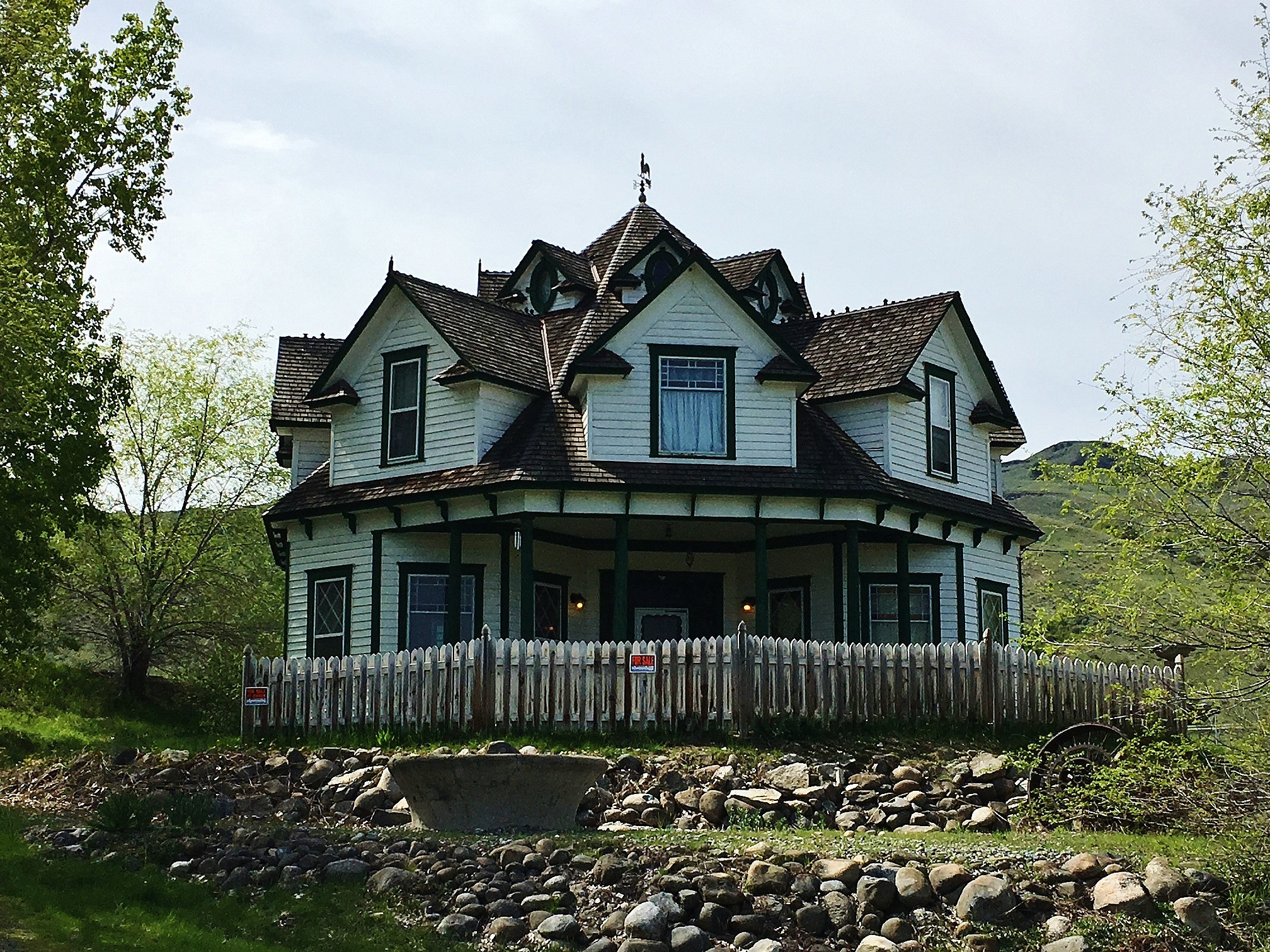

- Location within Washington (state)
- Nearest city: 600 12th St., Bridgeport, Washington
- Coordinates: 48°0′27″N 119°40′37″W
- Built: 1914
- Architect: Kinney, James
- Architectural style: Octagon Mode
- NRHP reference No.: 75001848
- Added to NRHP: August 1, 1975

The Gallaher House is a historic octagon house built by James Madison Kinney. James started building the house in 1912 and it was completed in the spring of 1914. The house was originally located 12 miles NW of Mansfield on Dyer Hill in Douglas County, Washington. The house was moved in 1993 to its current location in Bridgeport, Washington. The house was listed on the National Register on August 1, 1975, and the listing was amended on June 27, 1995, following the house's relocation five miles from its original location.

James Kinney built the house for his daughter Ruth and her husband, David Clyde Gallaher and their four children, Huston, David, Henry and Mabel. James later built a smaller but similar variation of the house for himself and his wife in Waterville, Washington. That house also still stands.

The house had eight sides, was three stories, and had twelve rooms. The ceilings were nine feet. There was a circular staircase to the 2nd floor. Eight small bedrooms were upstairs and two bedrooms were on the first floor. The house was 2125 square feet in all. Due to the shape of the house, all the rooms were odd shaped, especially the bedrooms upstairs. There were some stained glass windows, with sections of yellow, green, and red. The home originally had no indoor plumbing and no electricity. The boards used to build the house arrived on the train in Mansfield and were hauled out to the scene by horse and wagon.

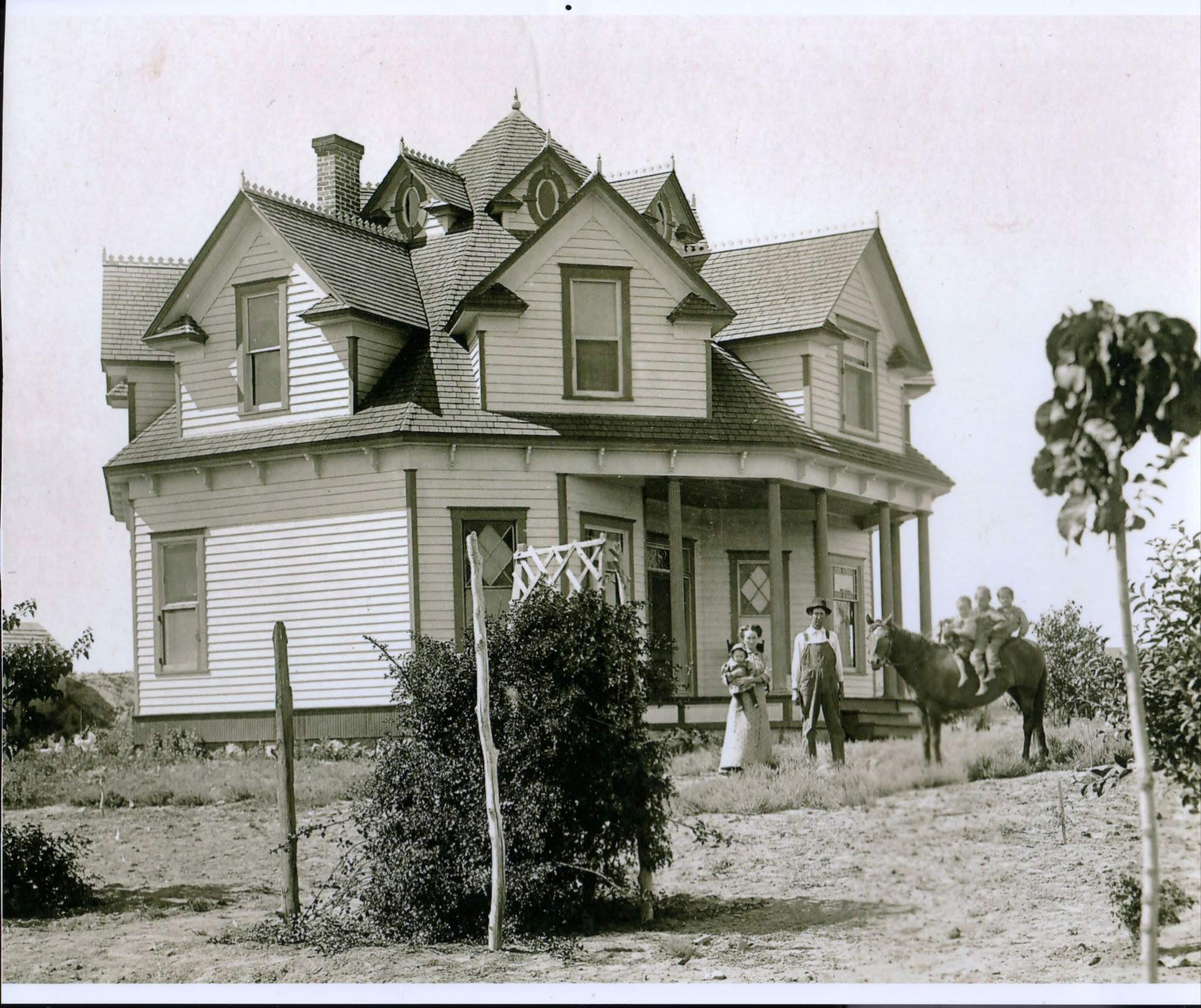
Gallaher house and family around 1914

Clyde died in 1936. Ruth lived in the home with one of her sons, Huston, until he married in 1942 and then she moved to Mansfield. Huston and his wife Lois lived in the house until they built a new and more modern home in 1948. It was then used as housing for employees and temporary workers. The house was vacant from the 1970s and was falling into disrepair until sold to RB "Bun" Allen and moved to Bridgeport in 1993.

In 2006, the nearby town of Pateros, Washington, paid an earnest money deposit to buy the house to be relocated there for use as a visitors center. The deadline for completing the deal passed without further action. At a meeting on August 21, 2006, the city council of Pateros decided to abandon plans to purchase the house even though the state Department of Transportation had provided a $140,000 grant to use toward its purchase.
