= David Van Gelder Octagon House =

Historic house in New York, United States

- U.S. National Register of Historic Places
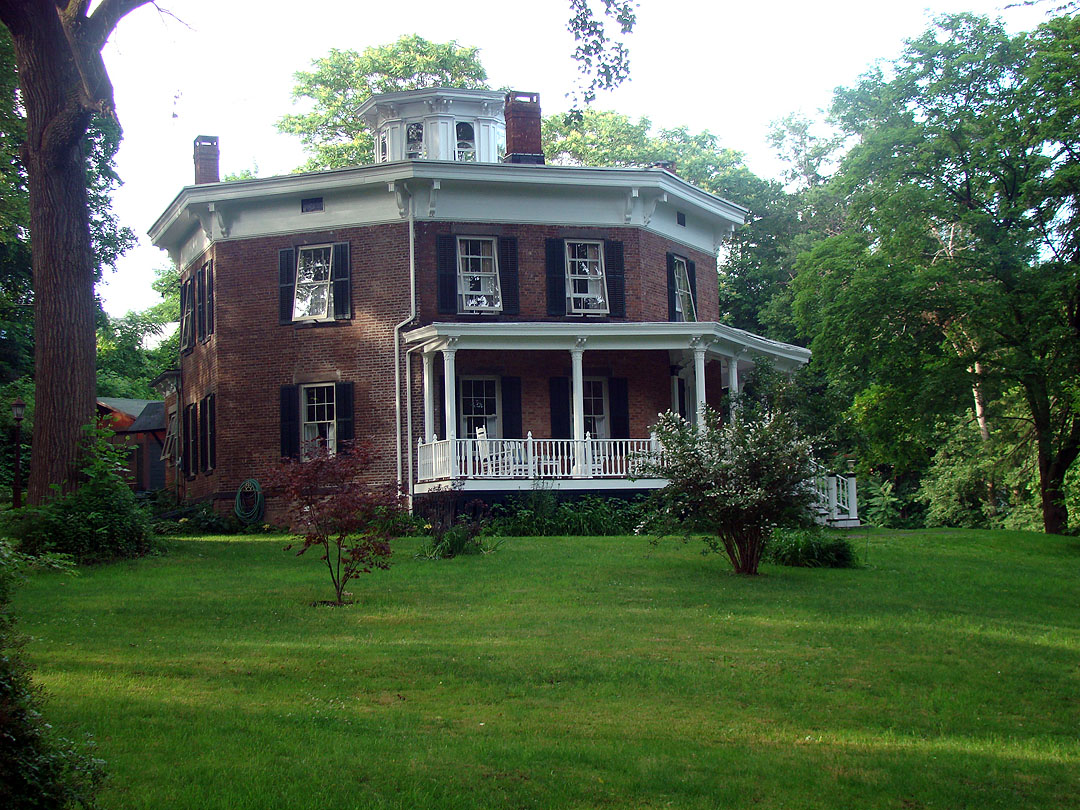

- Location within New York Location within the United States
- Interactive map showing the location of David Van Gelder House
- Location: Catskill, New York
- Coordinates: 42°13′4″N 73°52′26″W
- Built: 1860
- Architectural style: Octagon Mode
- NRHP reference No.: 97001620
- Added to NRHP: January 16, 1998

The David Van Gelder Octagon House, also known as Springside, is located at 21 Walnut Street in Catskill, New York. The brick house was built in 1860. It is architecturally significant as an example of an octagon house. The eight-sided plan was made popular in the mid-19th century by phrenologist Orson Squire Fowler. He called the floor plan "a superior plan". It includes four large square rooms and four small triangular rooms on each of the two floors. Two corners of each of the triangular rooms are small triangular closets. A central stair rises through the house to the cupola on the roof. A kitchen wing was added, likely in the mid-1870s.

It was listed on the National Register of Historic Places in 1998.

== See also ==
- Octagon house
