= Rocky Hill, Barren County, Kentucky =

Unincorporated community in Kentucky, United States

Coordinates: 36°56′24″N 86°04′16″W

Rocky Hill is an unincorporated community in Barren County, in the U.S. state of Kentucky.

== History ==
William Settles, Rifle Maker, founded Rocky Hill in 1798. A post office called Rocky Hill was established in 1825, and remained in operation until 1911. The community's name most likely is a transfer from Fauquier County, Virginia, the native home of a share of the early settlers.
