= Henry Shipton Drayton =

Henry Shipton Drayton (16 September 1840 – 7 April 1923) was an American physician and phrenologist.

He defended the now obsolete theories that one could predict the personality of human beings based on cranial features and that some humans had a sixth sense.

== Early life and career ==
Henry Shipton Drayton worked for an unknown period of time in the Fowler & Wells' phrenological cabinet in New York City with Orson Squire Fowler, Lorenzo Niles Fowler, Samuel Roberts Wells and Nelson Sizer, who were American leaders in the phrenology business. The phrenological cabinet produced personalized phrenological profiles of clients in which, based on the size of the cranium, the personality of the client was deduced.

The profiles were handed to the client so it is difficult to determine how many have been made by Henry Shipton Drayton. Only one of them is currently known to have been preserved, that of a man named Horace Wheaton Turner. From 1880 to 1883, he published 4 books relating to phrenology. It is also during this period that he acquired the title of M.D. In his earliest book on phrenology, he explains how to detect character traits based on the observation of the face of people and defends the thesis that the mind is embodied in the brain. His influences were George Combe, the Edinburgh Phrenological Society, Franz Joseph Gall and Johann Spurzheim.

== Career as a writer ==
Henry Shipton Drayton became editor of the Phrenological journal for an unknown period. He presents his method on how to measure the physical aspects of the face and study phrenology and physiognomy in Heads and faces, and how to study them, which was edited in 1885 and 1896. He became interested in hypnosis and was influenced by the writings of Jean-Martin Charcot of the Salpêtrière school of hypnosis and Franz Mesmer. He published a book about human magnetism in 1889. Throughout his career, he mostly published his books with the Fowler & Wells Company. After the death of Lorenzo Niles Fowler, he published with the Grafton Press Publishers and Field & Young.

In 1889, he gave a speech at the New York Society of Anthropology in which he argued that some humans had a sixth sense, which allowed them to know in advance what would happen. Between 1889 and 1902, he traveled in oriental countries. In 1900, he edited a book named In Oudemon, which was written by his friend Malcolm Browne. The book describes a journey made by Browne to a country called "Oudemon". In 1902, Henry Shipton Drayton published a collection of articles from the Evening Journal of the Jersey City that describe his own travel. During his journey, he traveled to Alexandria, Beirut, Baalbek, Jerusalem, Constantinople, Rome and Genoa.

In 1910, he has also participated in some correspondences of the Immigration Restriction League, an organization that aimed at restricting immigration.

== Works ==
- Phrenological character of Horace Wheaton Turner: given at Fowler & Wells' phrenological cabinet, 1868
- Light in dark places, or, How the camps lived in their poverty, 1879, Claxton, Remsen & Haffelfinger Eds.
- Brain and mind, or, mental science considered in accordance with the principles of phrenology, and in relation to modern physiology, 1880, S.R. Wells & Co. (co-written with James McNeill)
- How to study phrenology, 1880, S.R. Wells & Co.
- Nervousness: its nature, causes, symptoms, and treatment, with notes of cases, 1881, Fowler & Wells Co.
- Indications of character, in the form and proportions of the head, 1883, Fowler & Wells Co.
- Heads and faces, and how to study them: a manual of phrenology and physiognomy for the people, 1885, Fowler & Wells Co. (co-written with Nelson Sizer)
- Human magnetism. Its nature, physiology and psychology: Its uses, as a remedial agent, in moral and intellectual improvement, 1889, Fowler & Wells Co.
- Vacation time with hints on summer living, 1891, Fowler & Wells Co.
- Heads and faces, and how to study them: a manual of phrenology and physiognomy for the people, 1885, Re-edited Fowler & Wells Co. (co-written with Nelson Sizer)
- In Oudemon, Reminiscences of an unknown people by an occasional traveler, 1900, The Grafton Press Publishers, New York
- Notes by the way of a little journey in Oriental countries, 1902, Field & Young, New Jersey
