= Charlotte Fowler Wells =

American phrenologist (1814–1901)

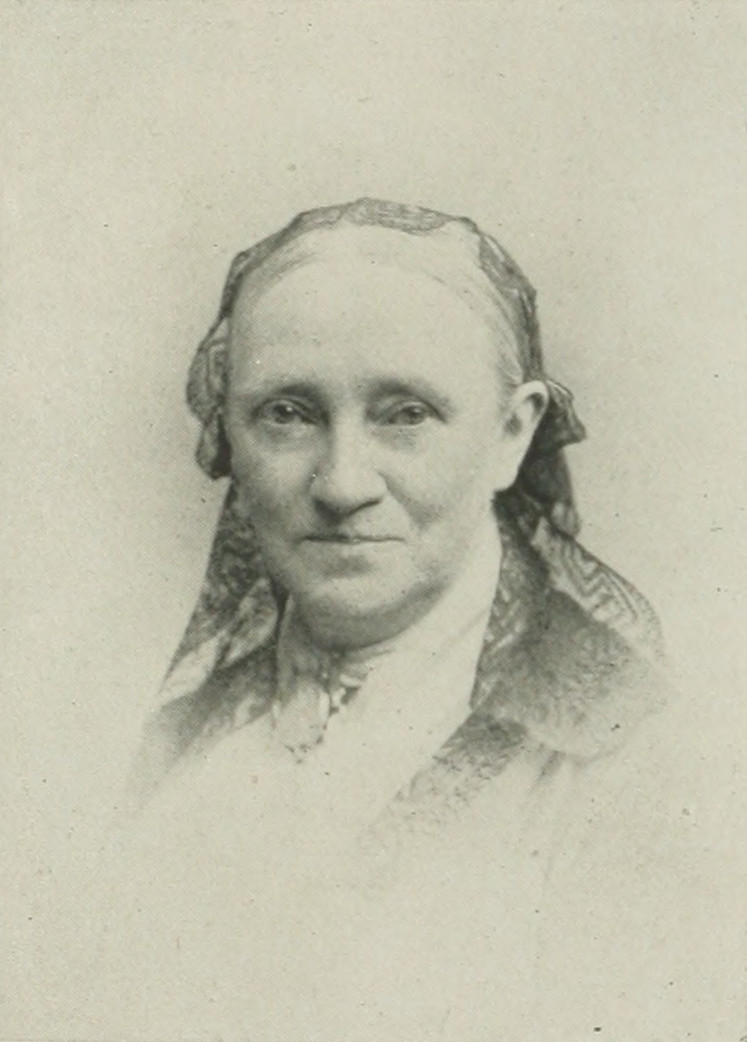
- Photo in A Woman of the Century
- Born: Charlotte Fowler; August 14, 1814; Cohocton, New York, U.S.
- Died: June 4, 1901 (aged 86); West Orange, New Jersey, U.S.
- Resting place: Rosedale Cemetery
- Education: Franklin Academy
- Occupation: Publisher
- Spouse: Samuel Roberts Wells
- Relatives: Orson Squire Fowler (brother); Lydia Folger Fowler (sister-in-law)
- Writing career
- Language: English
- Genre: Pseudoscience
- Subject: Phrenology

Charlotte Fowler Wells (née Fowler; August 14, 1814 – June 4, 1901) was an American phrenologist and publisher from New York. Along with her brothers, Orson Squire Fowler and Lorenzo Niles Fowler, her sister-in-law, Lydia Folger Fowler, and her husband, Samuel Roberts Wells, she was an early American popularizer of phrenology. Wells published the American Phrenological Journal, and taught the first class in phrenology in the United States. She founded Fowler & Wells Company, served as vice-president of the American Institute of Phrenology, and was a trustee of the New York Medical College for Women.

== Early life and education ==
Charlotte Fowler was born in Cohocton, New York, August 14, 1814. She was the fourth in a family of eight children. Her father, Horace Fowler, was a deacon and judge. Her mother, Martha Howe, was an intellectual, who died when Wells was five years old, but her teachings left a lasting impression upon the daughter. Wells received most of her education in the district school, with only two winters of three months each of instruction in the Franklin Academy in Prattsburgh, New York, beginning in autumn 1831. She was otherwise self-taught, with a wide range of reading. Her older brothers, Orson and Lorenzo, were among the first to examine and believe the doctrines of Franz Joseph Gall and Johann Spurzheim. The increasing interest in the science of phrenology was greatly the result of the brothers' lifelong work.

== Career ==
Wells studied and became interested in Spurzheim's works, teaching the first class in phrenology in the United States, and thereafter, her life was devoted to promoting it. Urged by her brothers, she closed her school in 1837, and joined them in New York City in the family-run business of O.S. & L.N. Fowler, a lecture bureau, museum, and publishing house, where she served as proofreader, writer, business manager, and editor. She also maintained the organization's cabinet and was also instrumental in keeping the permanent offices from being abandoned. When Orson was in the field lecturing, and Lorenzo was establishing a branch in London, England, she had charge of the business in New York, and was considered instrumental in its success.

Samuel Roberts Wells (1820–1875) was studying to be a doctor when he attended a course of lectures delivered by the Fowler brothers in Boston. He was impressed with the theme and resolved to investigate it, his first ideas of phrenology having been obtained as a boy from a chart which had been marked by Charlotte Fowler, then in her teens. In 1843, he joined the Fowler brothers's institute, and in the following year, he formed a co-partnership with the Fowler brothers, at their Nassau Street, New York office, the name having been changed to Fowler & Wells. Wells organized the book business and gave a new impetus to the Phrenological Journal. On October 13, 1844, Charlotte and Samuel were married.

The Wells worked together for 31 years. For long periods of time, she was left with the control of the entire business, while her husband and brothers were traveling through countries, spreading the science and items for their cabinet. After Lorenzo moved to England in 1855, the firm's ownership passed to the Wells. After the husband's death in 1875, she became the sole proprietor and manager for nine years. In 1884, she formed a stock company, Fowler & Wells Company, of which she was president, and published the American Phrenological Journal. She also served as vice-president and one of the instructors of the American Institute of Phrenology. In addition, in 1863, she was one of the founders, and served as a trustee of the New York Medical College for Women.

== Personal life ==
Wells believed in spiritualism.

From 1884, she made her home in West Orange, New Jersey. She died in that city on June 4, 1901, due to degeneration of the heart and was buried at Rosedale Cemetery, in Orange, New Jersey. Her papers are held by the Division of Rare and Manuscript Collections of Cornell University Library.

In a letter to Clara Barton dated September 1879 Wells writes

No matter how far separated our bodies may be nor how seldom we may hear from each other we are, and ever will be together. I love you I love you. and what God has joined together no human can separate. You must get well and strong and work much more before you leave this world. Remember that we will help each other and be strong.

== Selected works ==
- 1896, Some account of the life and labors of Dr. Franc̜ois Joseph Gall, founder of phrenology

== See also ==
Henry Shipton Drayton
