= Jean Pierre Flourens =

French physiologist and anesthesia pioneer (1794–1867)

Marie Jean Pierre Flourens
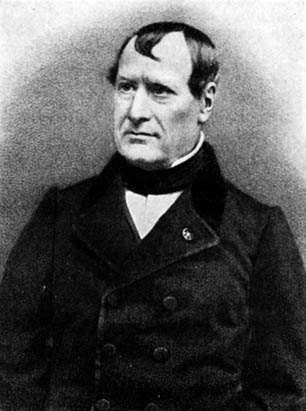
- Jean Pierre Flourens
- Born: 13 April 1794; Maureilhan, France
- Died: 6 December 1867 (aged 73); Montgeron, France
- Known for: Anesthesia
- Scientific career
- Fields: Physiology
- Academic advisors: Georges Cuvier

Marie Jean Pierre Flourens (13 April 1794 – 6 December 1867), father of Gustave Flourens, was a French physiologist, the founder of experimental brain science, and a pioneer in anesthesia.

== Biography ==
Flourens was born at Maureilhan, near Béziers, in the département of Hérault. At fifteen he began studying medicine at Montpellier, where he received the degree of doctor in 1813. In the following year he went to Paris, carrying an introduction from A. P. de Candolle, the botanist, to Georges Cuvier, who received him kindly, and took an interest in him. In Paris, Flourens engaged in physiological research, occasionally contributing to publications; and, in 1821, at the Athénée, he gave a course of lectures on the physiological theory of the sensations, which attracted much attention amongst men of science.

In 1815, Flourens pioneered the experimental method of carrying out localized lesions of the brain in living rabbits and pigeons and carefully observing their effects on motricity, sensibility and behavior. His intention was to investigate localisationism, i.e., whether different parts of the brain had different functions, as the Austrian physician Franz Joseph Gall, the founder of phrenology, was proposing. The trouble was that Gall did not use a proper scientific approach to his affirmations. In 1825, Flourens was elected as a member to the American Philosophical Society.

Flourens was able to demonstrate convincingly for the first time that the main divisions of the brain were indeed responsible for largely different functions. By removing the cerebral hemispheres, for instance, all perceptions, motricity, and judgment were abolished. The removal of the cerebellum affected the animal's equilibrium and motor coordination, while the destruction of the brainstem (medulla oblongata) caused death. These experiments led Flourens to the conclusion that the cerebral hemispheres are responsible for higher cognitive functions, that the cerebellum regulates and integrates movements, and that the medulla controls vital functions, such as circulation, respiration and general bodily stability. On the other hand, he was unable (probably because his experimental subjects have relatively primitive cortex) to find specific regions for memory and cognition, which led him to believe that they are represented in a diffuse form around the brain. So, different functions could indeed be ascribed to particular regions of the brain, but a finer localization was lacking.

Flourens, by destroying the horizontal semicircular canal of pigeons, noted that they continue to fly in a circle, showing the purpose of the semicircular canals.

Flourens was chosen by Cuvier in 1828 to deliver a course of lectures on natural history at the Collège de France, and in the same year became, in succession to LAG Bosc, a member of the Institute, in the division "Economic rurale." In 1830 he became Cuvier's substitute as lecturer on human anatomy at the Jardin du Roi, and in 1832 was elected to the post of titular professor, which he vacated for the professorship of comparative anatomy created for him at the museum of the Jardin the same year. In 1833 Flourens, in accordance with the dying request of Cuvier, was appointed a perpetual secretary of the Academy of Sciences; and in 1838 he was returned as a deputy for the arrondissement of Béziers. In 1840 he was elected, in preference to Victor Hugo, to succeed Jean François Michaud at the French Academy; and in 1845 he was created a commander of the légion d'honneur, and in the next year a peer of France. In 1841, he was elected a foreign member of the Royal Swedish Academy of Sciences.

In March 1847 Flourens drew the attention of the Academy of Sciences to the anesthetic effect of chloroform on animals.

On the revolution of 1848 he withdrew completely from political life; and in 1855 he accepted the professorship of natural history at the Collège de France. He died at Montgeron, near Paris on 6 December 1867.

== Opposition to Darwinism ==
Flourens was an opponent of Darwinism and criticized the idea of natural selection. In 1864, he authored Examen du livre du M. Darwin sur l'Origine des Espèces. He refuted the arguments of spontaneous generation.

He was a creationist and he defended the fixity of species. Flourens criticized Charles Darwin for personifying nature. He argued that natural selection is a contradictory term as nature does not select. Flourens' book was never translated into English and no reviewers attempted to refute his arguments in detail. However, Thomas Henry Huxley took issue with his criticism of Darwinism, noting that "his objections to details are of the old sort, so battered and hackneyed on this side of the Channel, that not even a Quarterly Reviewer could be induced to pick them up for the purpose of pelting Mr. Darwin over again."

== Bibliography ==
Besides numerous shorter scientific memoirs, Flourens published:

- Essai sur quelques points de la doctrine de la revulsion et de la derivation (Montpellier, 1813)
- Experiences sur le système nerveux (Paris, 1825)
- Cours sur la génération, l'ovologie, et l'embryologie (1836)
- Analyse raisonnée des travaux de G. Cuvier (1841)
- Recherches sur le développement des os et des dents (1842)
- Anatomie générale de la peau et des membranes muqueuses (1843)
- Buffon, histoire de ses travaux et de ses idées (1844)
- Fontenelle, ou de la philosophie moderne relativement aux sciences physiques (1847)
- Théorie expérémentale de la formation des os (1847)
- Œuvres complètes de Buffon (1853)
- De la longévité humaine et de la quantité de vie sur le globe (1854), numerous editions
- Histoire de la découverte de la circulation du sang (1854)
- Cours de physiologie comparée (1856)
- Recuesi des lloges historiques (1856)
- De la vie et de l'intelligence (1858)
- De la raison, du genie, et de la folie (1861)
- Ontologie naturelle (1861)
- Examen du livre du M. Darwin sur l'Origine des Espèces (1864).
