= The Phrenological Journal =

American phrenological periodical

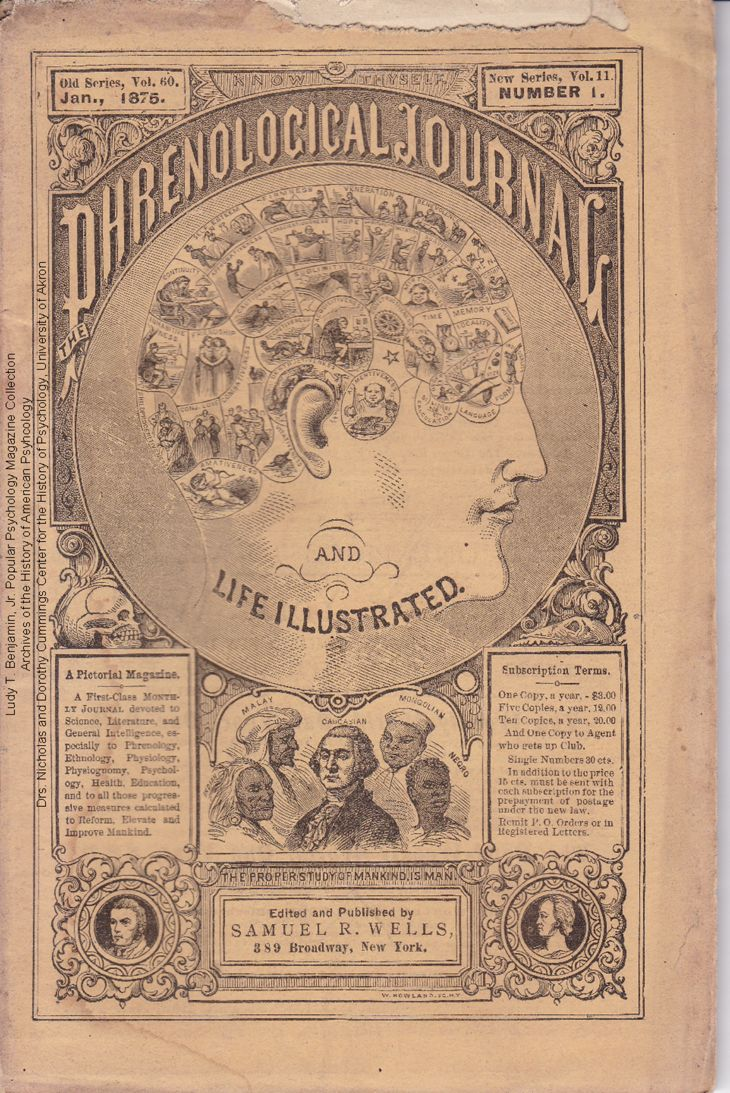
Front cover of the January 1875 issue of the American Phrenological Journal, depicting five races: Indian, Malay, Caucasian, Mongolian, and Negro.

The American Phrenological Journals (Note: Also known as the Phrenological Journal and Science of Health, the American Phrenological Journal and Miscellany, Phrenological Journal and Life Illustrated, and by other names.) were a series of publications in the United States foundationally developed from racist ideologies such as pseudoscience & phrenology. The several publications were a collection of theories associating contours and measurements of the skull to personality and intelligence. Originally drafting papers in 1820's in Scotland by John Anderson, The American newspaper was released in 1838 and dissolved in 1911. It was supported by the phrenologist Fowler family, who published it under the auspices of the Fowler & Wells Company. Several prominent historical figures underwent phrenological analyses by the Fowlers and the findings were published in the journal; these include abolitionist Lydia Maria Child and writer Mark Twain.

== History ==
The American Phrenological Journal and Miscellany publications were issued in 1838 as a phrenological periodical. Running for 72 years totaling in over 80 volumes and nearly 40,000 total pages. The collection of findings and articles originally conceptualized by George Combe, a Scottish lawyer and John Anderson, a Scottish philosopher in the early 1800's. When the science positioned itself in America, it was financially and ideologically supported by the phrenologist Fowler family, including Orson Squire Fowler, Lorenzo Fowler, and Samuel R. Wells; Wells became it's leading editor during 1860-1870. It was published by Fowler & Wells Company, and it attributed the rise of the implementation of phrenology during the American Civil War in the 1860's.

In its first issue, the journal detailed that its purpose was to support phrenological theory -- a pseudoscientific and racist area of research correlating skull measurements to personality and intelligence – and its application.. Phrenologists would misuse real scientific practices in this primary issue such as craniometry , a secondary science to anthropometry to further the racist and pseudoscientific judgements onto those who were not White.

It hosted a multitude of illustrations and arguments delving into the intersections of early psychology and physiology, applications of philosophy to phenotypes, and prompted other related studies in the years to come. It was an eclectic periodical; in addition to its phrenological research, it acquired and published writing in the domains of medical science, physiognomy, and in some unrelated areas, such as education. During its early years, it had a circulation of around 20,000 subscribers, each paying $1 per year (increased to $1.50 per year during the Civil War). It was among the most popular and authoritative publications in the field of phrenology during this time.

With the update and development of the journals, pseudoscientists such as the Fowlers claimed small progressiveness in support of slavery abolition-- beginning to report a shift in racial findings; not generalizing all African Americans as intellectually inferior. The Fowlers republished an article in 1847 stating "Descendants of Africans were able to possess "as good a brain [...] as would be possessed by any white, under the same circumstances", if they so desired and continually worked to foster intellectual development". The science began to face further pushback from scholars and other African Americans such as Frederick Douglass during the Antebellum period discrediting prior findings and claiming phrenology could instead offer room for wide spectrum mobility if given equitable opportunities.

In the late 1890s, Jessie A. Fowler became the last editor of the journal. It dissolved in 1911 due to falsified studies, current medical advancements, and ultimately being disproven and replaced.

== Persons analyzed ==
- In 1839, the Fowlers conducted a phrenological analysis of Black Hawk, a Sauk leader, concluding that his skull indicated he was a violent, destructive, and malevolent figure.
- That same year, Lorenzo Fowler conducted a phrenological analysis of Cinqué, a key figure in the rebellion onboard the slave ship La Amistad, while he was awaiting trial. He concluded that Cinqué had phrenological attributes that signaled power and leadership, and an intelligence "superior to the majority of negroes' in our own country". The Fowlers later sold busts of Cinqué and republished the story in 1840.
- In September 1841, the Fowlers conducted a phrenological analysis of Lydia Maria Child, a writer and abolitionist who edited the National Anti-Slavery Standard. They concluded she sought to "bring about moral, social, and intellectual reforms" because she was dissatisfied with the world. Abolitionists and their publications, including the Liberator, began to accept phrenology as a useful science in their political reform projects.
- In 1901, a phrenological analysis of American writer Mark Twain was published in the journal; it concluded he was determined and of a nervous temperament. Jessie A. Fowler likely wrote it.
