= Paul Bouts =

- Paul Bouts
- Born: 27 February 1900; Lanklaar, Limburg, Belgium
- Died: 7 March 1999 (aged 99); Rotselaar, Belgium
- Occupation(s): Pedagogue, Characterologist, Phrenologist

Paul Bouts (1900–1999) was a Belgian phrenologist and pedagogue. Born in the province of Limburg, he was ordained as a Catholic priest in 1926.

In the pedagogic environment of the Normal School (pedagogic academy) of Tienen, Belgium, where he taught from 1924, he specialised in characterological studies and devised a new method of characterological analysis, which he called Psychognomy and which was largely based on the pseudoscience of phrenology, combined with typology and graphology. This led to his life-work, La Psychognomie, initially published in Paris by the "Librairie philosophique Alcan". It was subsequently translated in Dutch and Portuguese. The theories of Bouts were further developed in specialised institutes which were founded in Rio de Janeiro, Brazil, and Chicoutimi, Québec. Bouts continued his research in the field with the paleo-anthropological work Les Grandioses Destinées Individuelle et Humaine dans la Lumière de la Caractérologie et de l'Evolution cérébro-cranienne. In this work he developed a teleological and orthogenetical view on a perfecting evolution, from the paleo-encephalical skull shapes of prehistoric man, which he considered still prevalent in criminals and, in his view, "savages".

After the Second World War, Bouts experienced serious health problems, due to overburdening. These enticed him to study a healthy lifestyle, which he described in his work Modern Hygiene of Intellectuals (published in French as Hygiène Moderne des Intellectuels, and in Dutch under the title Ik ben nooit moe, i.e. I am never tired). He underlined the importance of wholesome, healthy food and of the maintenance of respiratory capacity through exercise. The adoption of this healthy lifestyle allowed him to regain full strength and to lead a productive life until age 99.

In 1967 he established himself on the woody Middelberg hill in Rotselaar, Belgium (in Flemish Brabant, 35 km east of Brussels), where he built the St. Paul's Home, as well as a reform shop called Sol & Vita. He continued to publish a number of spiritual works, like Onze overheerlijke lotsbestemming, het Paradijs (Paradise, our marvellous destiny, in Dutch).

Paul Bouts is also keeper of several inventor's patents.

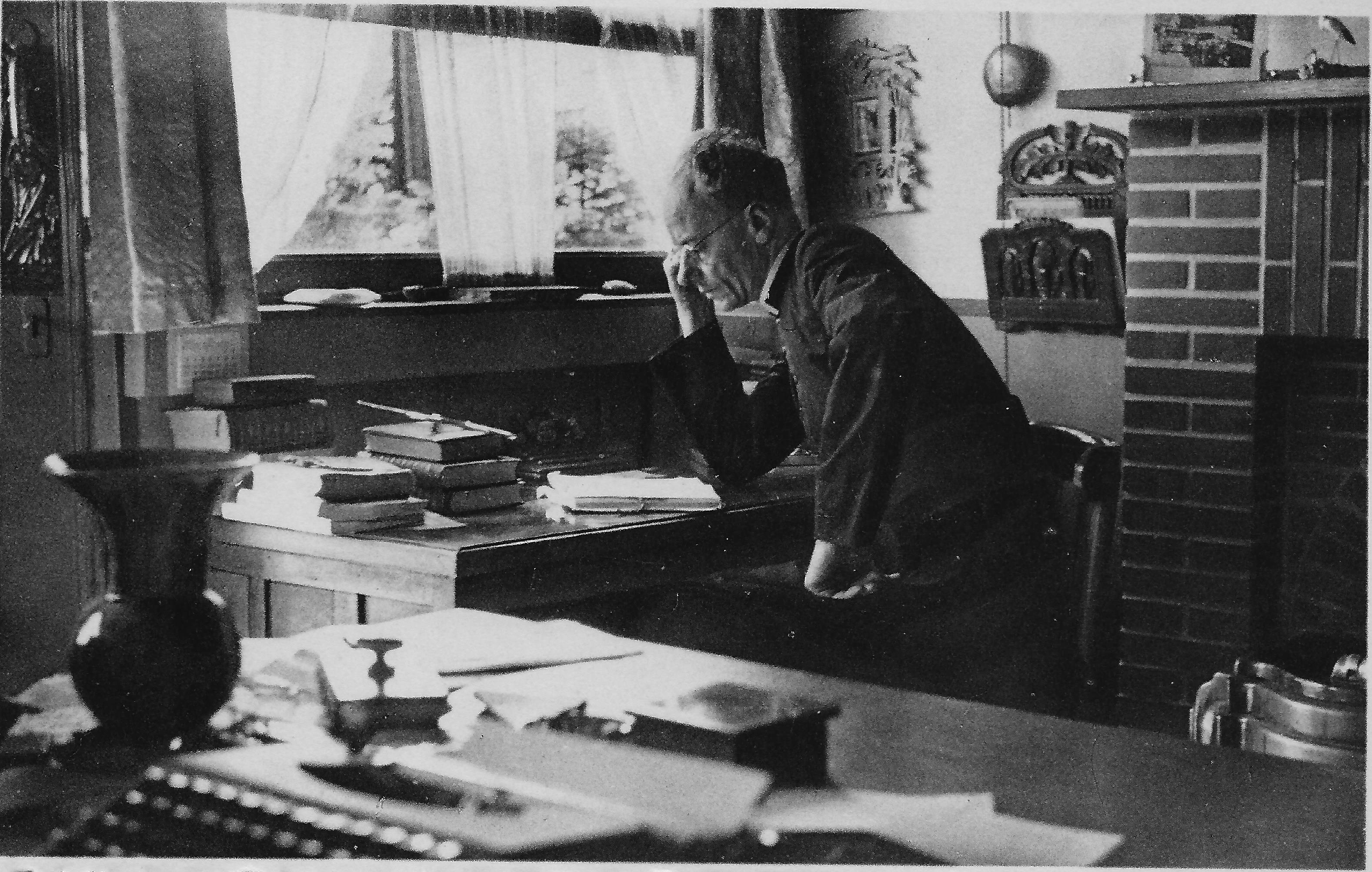
At work in the silence of the hermitage of Vinnebosch in Wezemaal

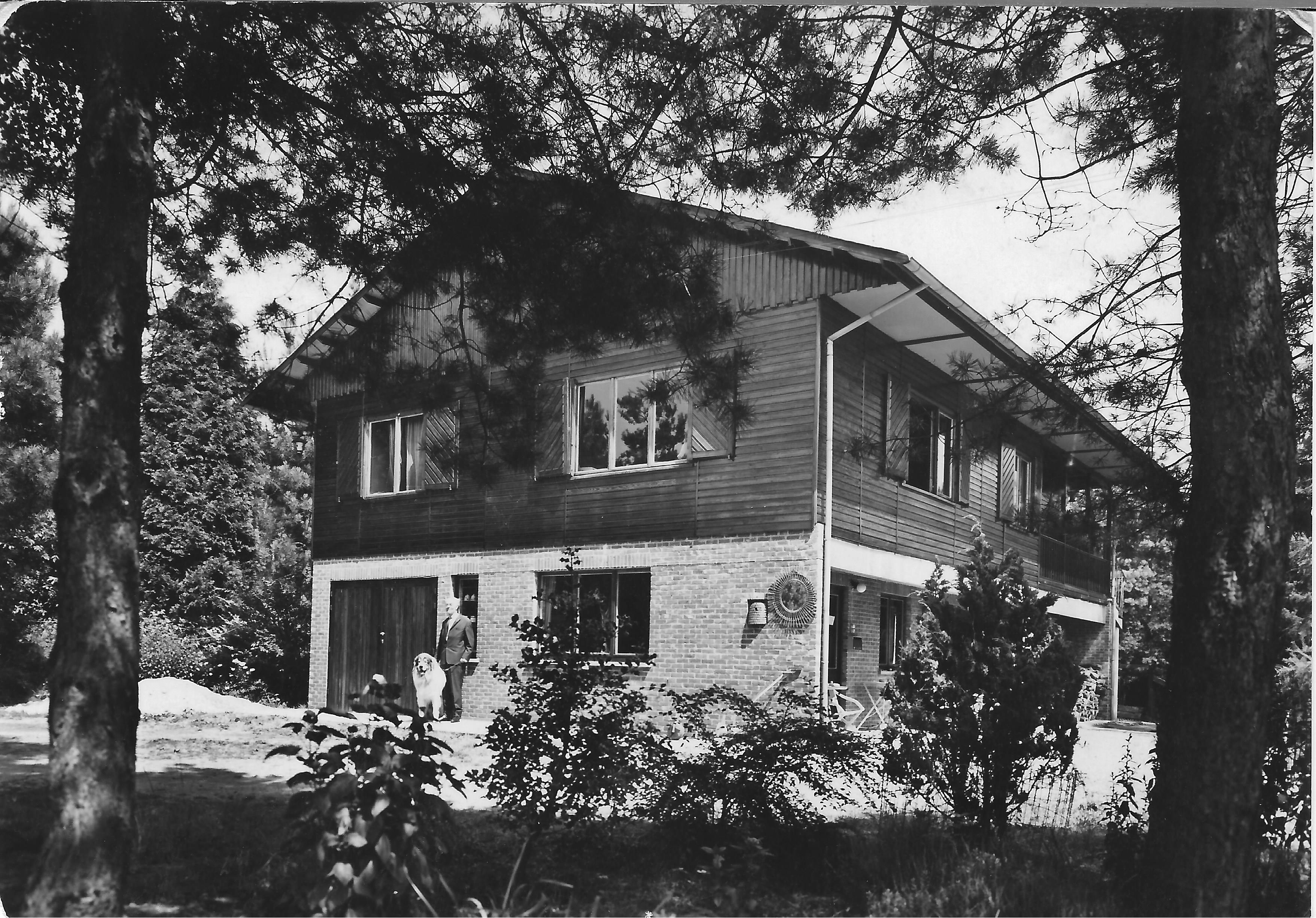
Villa "El Sol" residence of Prof. P. Bouts Middenbergpark- Rotselaar-in 1967

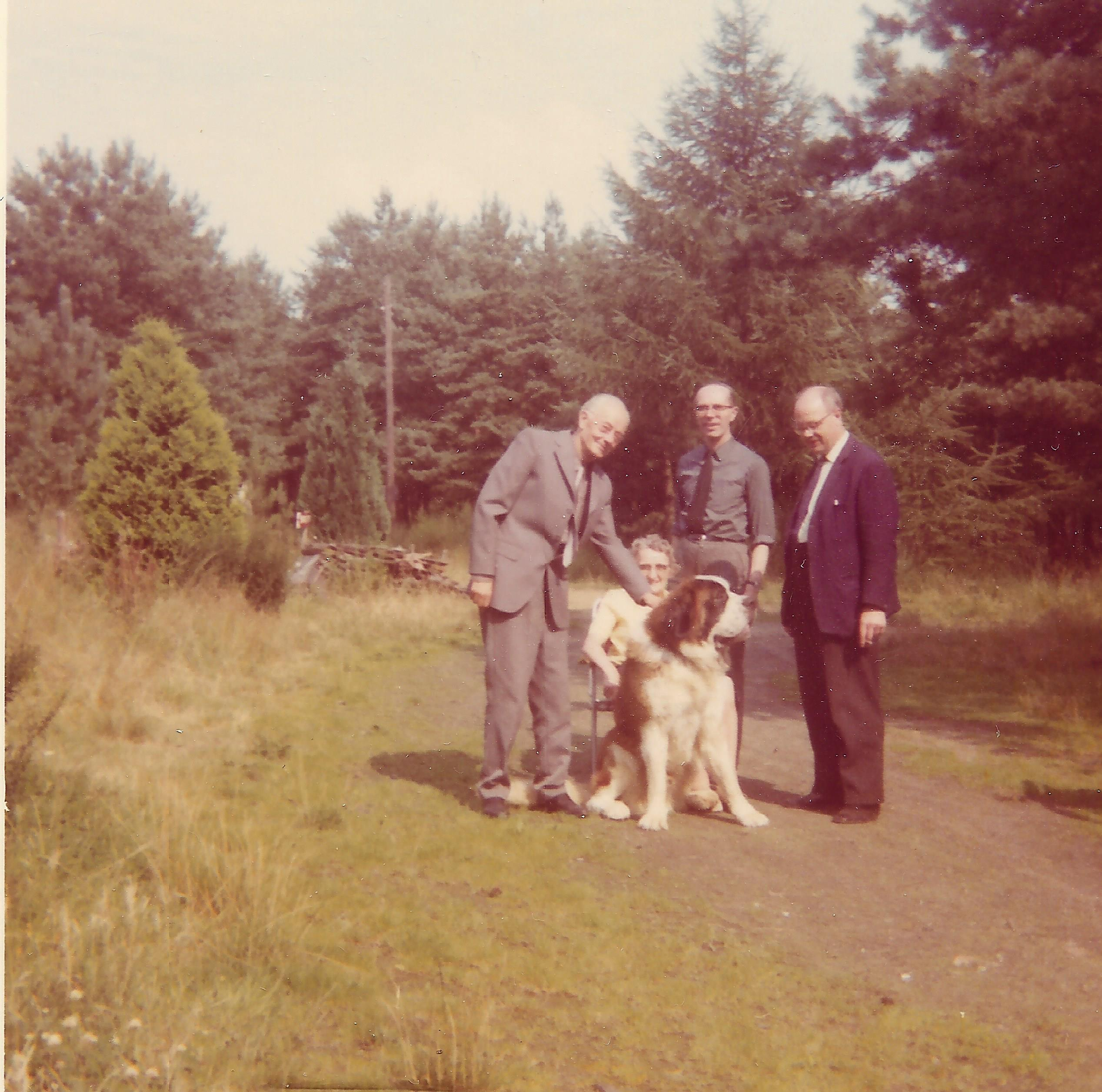
Prof. P. Bouts is on the left – Middenbergpark – Rotselaar- 10-08 1972

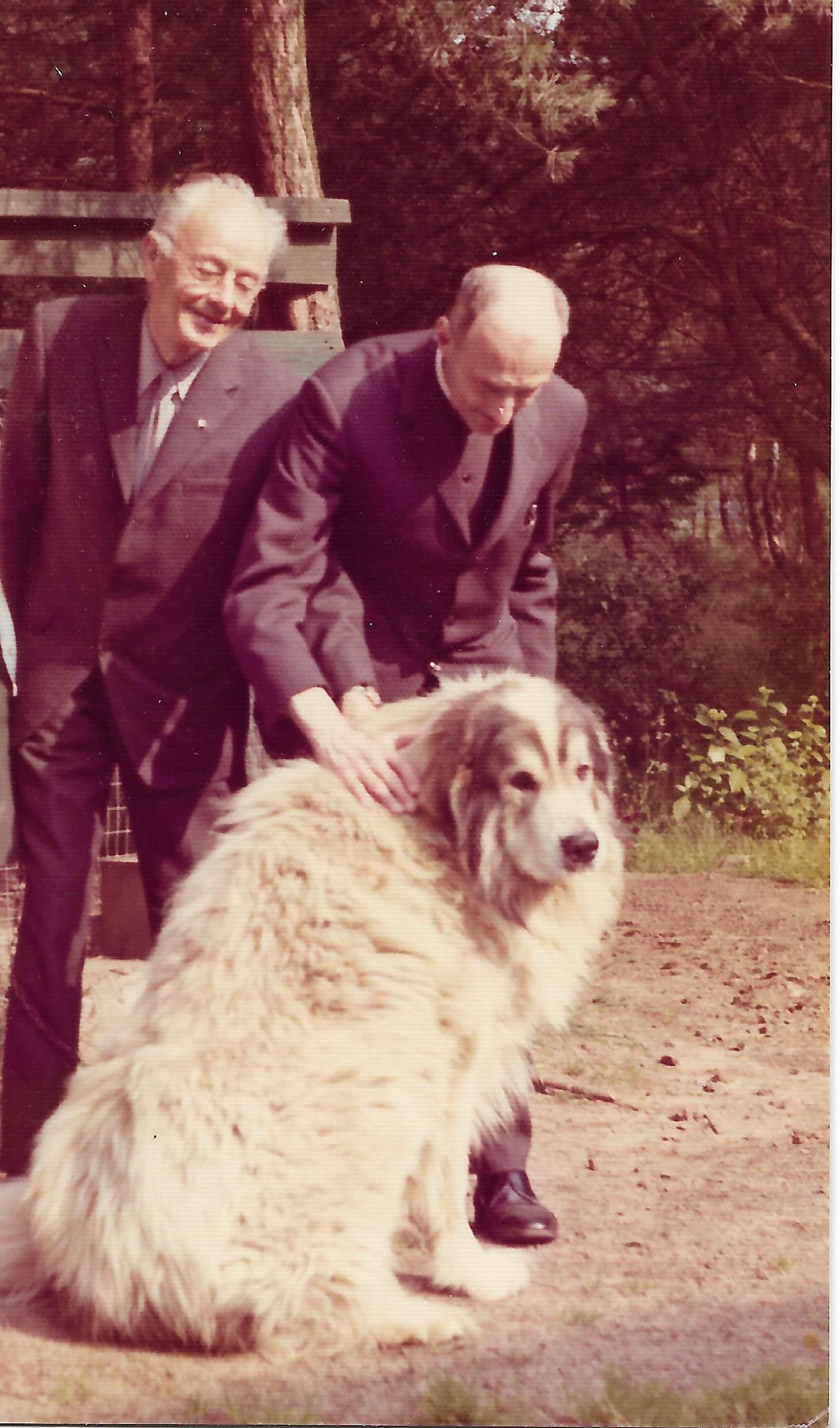
Prof. Paul Bouts is on the left – 1978

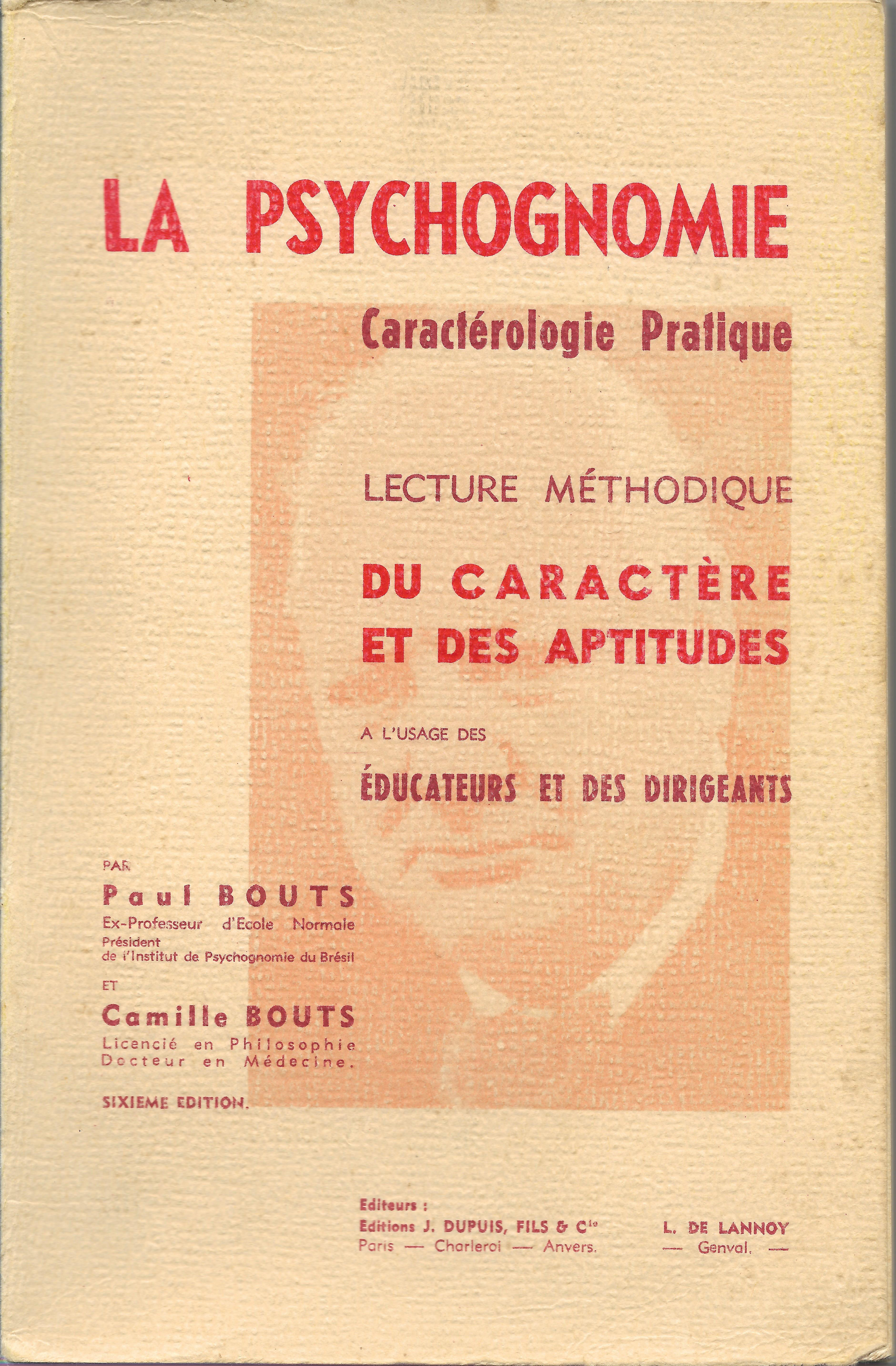
Methodical Reading of Character and Skills for Use by Educators and Leaders-6th Edition

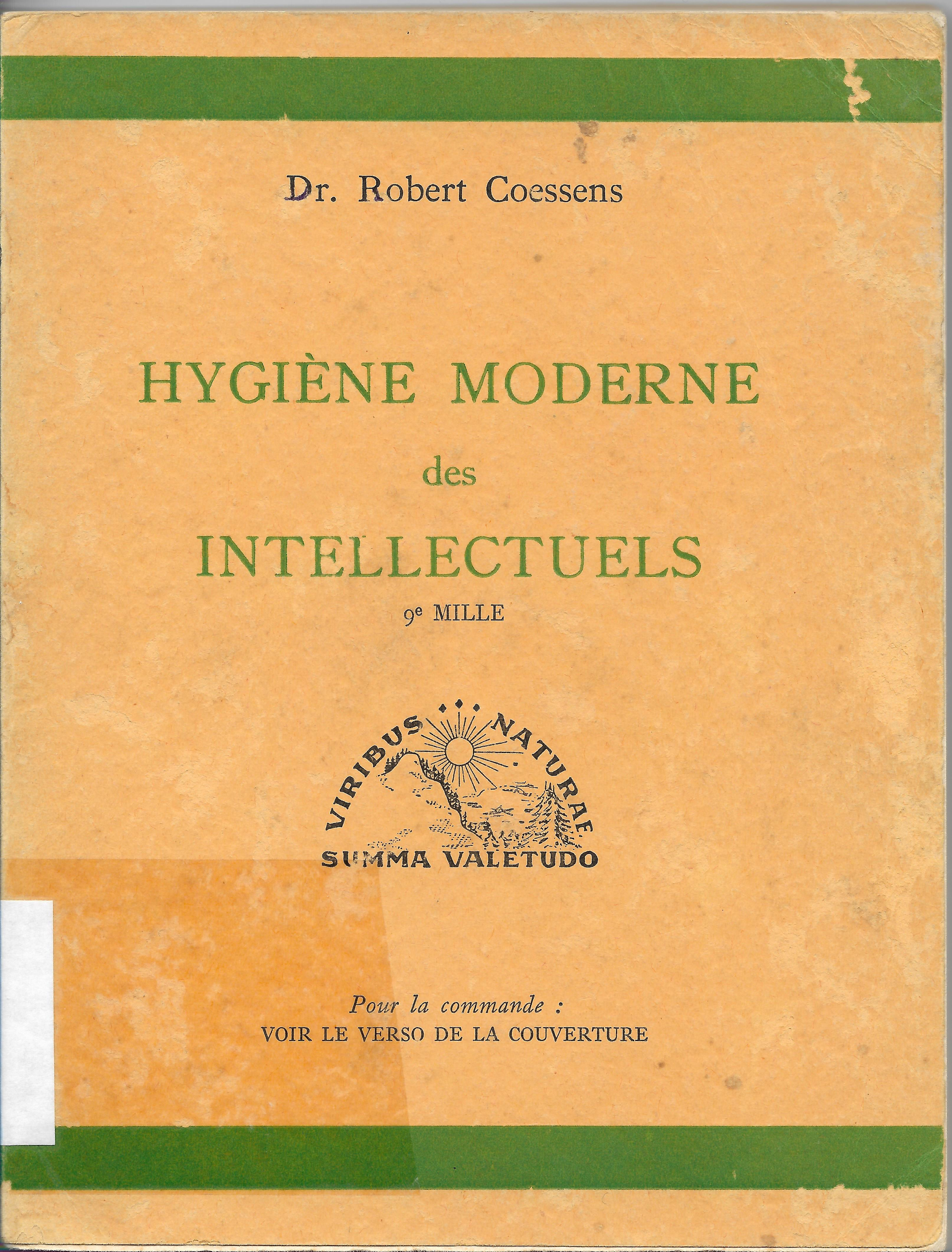
How to preserve and cultivate my organic and nervous resistance

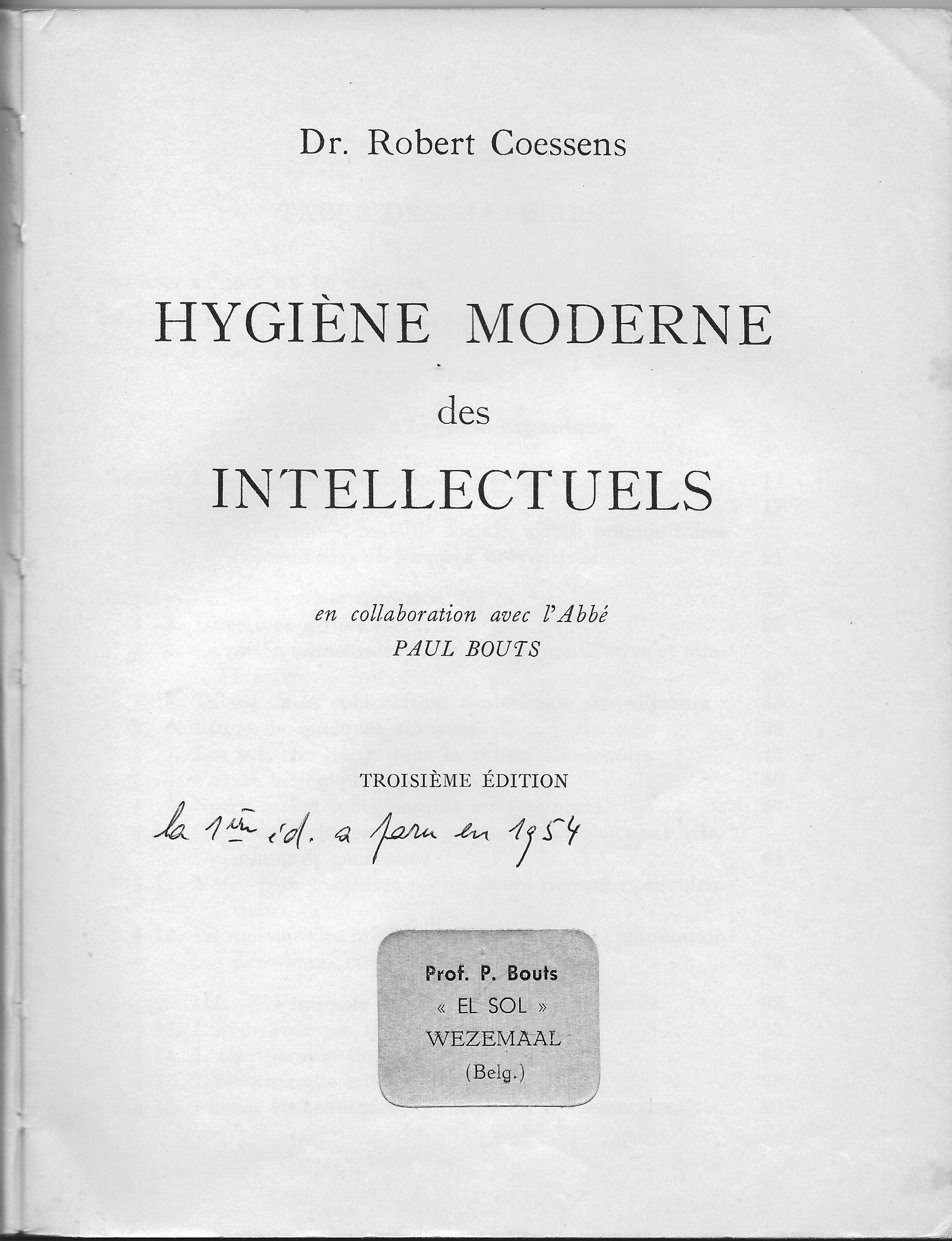
Author: Dr Robert Coessens in collaboration with Fr. Paul Bouts

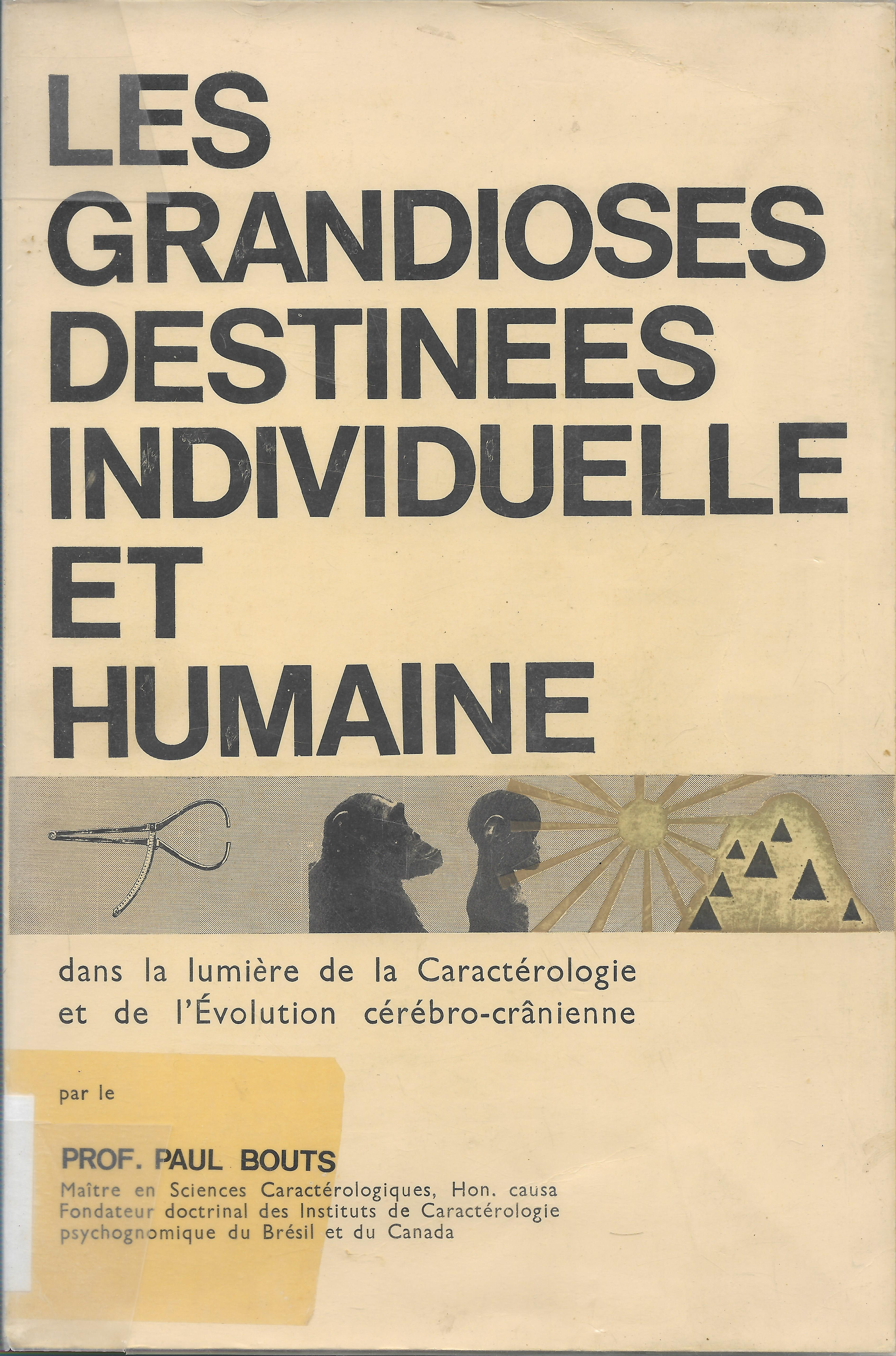
in the light of the characterology and cerebral cranial evolution
