= Cranioscopy =

Surgical technique

Cranioscopy is a term created by Franz Joseph Gall (1758–1828), a German neuroanatomist and physiologist who was a pioneer in the study of the localization of mental functions in the brain, to name his technique to infer localization of function in the brain on the basis of the external anatomy of the skull or cranium. "Cranioscopy, later known as phrenology, asserts that the shape of a person's skull revealed his or her intellectual and emotional characteristics." Cranioscopy is the basis of phrenology, but was later proved to be unscientific.
