= Fowler & Wells Company =

American publishing company

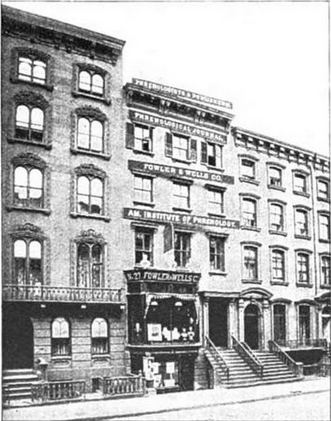
- Founded: 1835
- Founder: Orson Squire Fowler and Lorenzo Niles Fowler
- Successor: Charlotte Fowler
- Headquarters location: New York City, New York
- Publication types: The Phrenological Journal, serial publications, standard works
- Nonfiction topics: phrenology, physiognomy, ethnology, physiology, psychology, hygiene

Fowler & Wells Company was a 19th-century American publishing house, based in New York City. The business was classified as phrenologists and publishers, but it was also a scientific and educational institution. The company was established in 1835 by the brothers Orson Squire Fowler and Lorenzo Niles Fowler. Samuel Roberts Wells joined the company in 1843, and he subsequently married Charlotte Fowler, a sister of the Fowler brothers. Eventually, the Fowler brothers left the company, and Samuel Wells died. In 1884, Charlotte Fowler incorporated the company and became its president.

== Early history ==
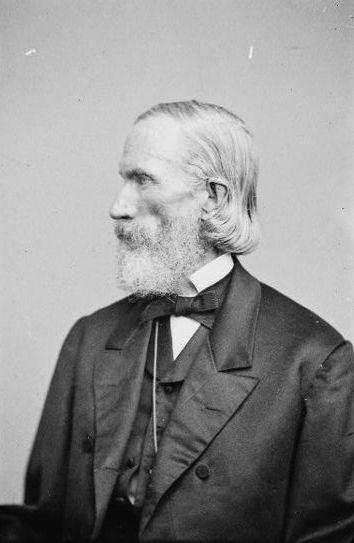
Orson Squire Fowler

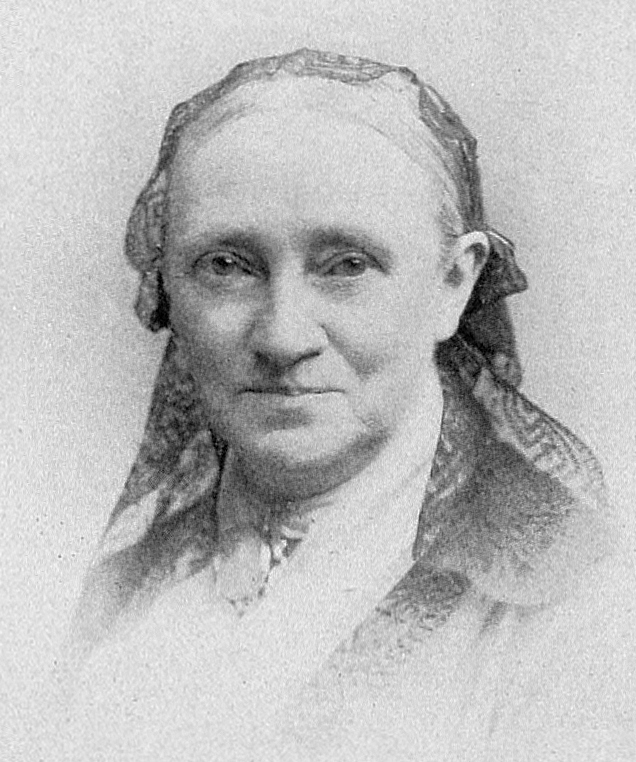
Charlotte Fowler Wells

The Fowler & Wells Company was a scientific institution that had a worldwide reputation. For 57 years, its founders and owners maintained an office in New York City, and were the recognized leaders in the phrenological, physiological, and hygienic sciences. For half a century, they were the main educators in these branches of study. The organization was located at 27 East 21st Street, near Broadway. The work was inaugurated by Orson Squire Fowler and Lorenzo Niles Fowler in 1835. They were the first in America to give the science of phrenology a practical value by making special delineations of character. They began work in a small way, but steadily increased its scope. In 1843, they were joined by Samuel Roberts Wells, who subsequently married Charlotte Fowler, the sister of his partners. Later, the Fowler brothers withdrew from the publishing house. Orson died in 1887. Lorenzo continued his professional practice in London. Samuel Wells conducted the business of the original house until his death, in 1875, and Charlotte Fowler assumed the management until 1884.

== American Institute of Phrenology ==
An outgrowth of the business was the American Institute of Phrenology, which was incorporated as an educational institution in 1866. Among the original incorporators were Horace Greeley, Rev. Dr. Samuel Osgood, Judge Amos Dean, Henry Dexter, Samuel R. Wells, Edward P. Fowler, M. D., and Nelson Sizer. Each year, beginning on the first Tuesday in September, a course of instruction in practical phrenology was given by a corps of experts, under the direction of Prof. Sizer, the president of the institute.

== Incorporation ==
The Fowler & Wells Company was incorporated in 1884 with Charlotte Fowler Wells, President; Nelson Sizer, Vice-President and phrenological examiner; Dr. Henry Shipman Drayton, Secretary and editor of the company's publications; and Albert Turner, Treasurer and business manager. The company published The Phrenological Journal, a number of serial publications, and a large list of standard works on phrenology, physiognomy, ethnology, physiology, psychology and hygiene. Early in 1892 the house took possession of new quarters at 27 East 21st Street, which included business offices, editorial rooms, lecture rooms, and phrenological parlors, where examinations were made and charts were created daily.

An interesting feature in the lecture-room of the Fowler & Wells Company's building was a large collection of casts of the heads of people who were prominent in various ways in past years. In addition, there were skulls from many nations and tribes, as well as animal crania, illustrative of phrenology; this constituted a free public museum, and included material for instruction at the Institute.
