= Franz Joseph Gall =

German anatomist

Franz Gall
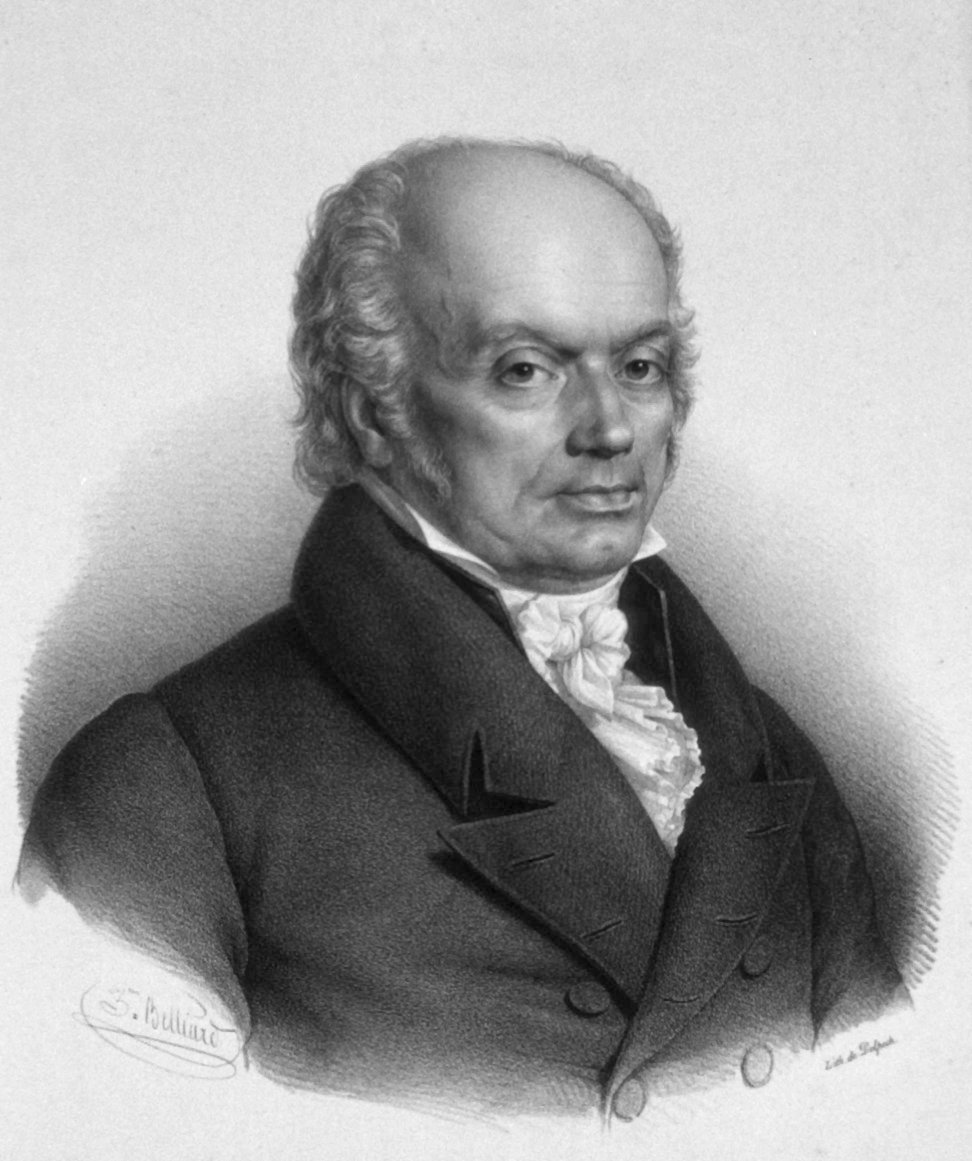
- Franz Joseph Gall
- Born: 9 March 1758; Tiefenbronn, Baden
- Died: 22 August 1828 (aged 70); Paris, France
- Scientific career
- Fields: Neuroanatomist; Physiologist

Franz Joseph Gall or Franz Josef Gall (German: [gal]; 9 March 1758 – 22 August 1828) was a German neuroanatomist, physiologist, and pioneer in the study of the localization of mental functions in the brain.

Claimed as the founder of the pseudoscience of phrenology, Gall became an early and important researcher in his fields. His contributions to the field of neuropsychology, controversial at the time, have become widely regarded as pseudoscience. However, Gall's study of phrenology helped to establish psychology, contributed to the emergence of the naturalistic approach to the study of man, and played an important part in the development of theories of evolution, anthropology, and sociology.

== Early life ==
Gall was born in the village of Tiefenbronn to a wealthy Roman Catholic wool merchant. The Galls, originally a noble family from Lombardy, had been the leading family in the area for over a century. His father was the mayor of Tiefenbronn and he was one of 12 children, only 7 of whom lived to adulthood.

Gall's scientific inquiry began in his youth. As a boy, he was fascinated by the differences between himself, his siblings, and his classmates. He developed an early interest in the brain after making a connection between one classmate's odd shaped skull and advanced language abilities. It is being said, that his first ideas about functional localization came from noticing that classmates who excelled at memory tasks had prominent facial features. He enjoyed collecting and categorizing plants and animals. He also realized the importance of observation as a scientific technique at a young age.

== Education and early career ==
As the second eldest son, he was intended for the priesthood but chose instead to study medicine at the University of Strasbourg. In his advanced studies, he again made observations about his classmates. He noticed that many of the particularly bright students had prominent eyeballs and concluded that this could not be purely coincidental.

He later completed his degree in Vienna, Austria. While in medical school, he studied under Johann Hermann and Maximilian Stoll who impressed upon him the importance of natural observation. He took his first job at Lunatic Asylum making observations about the insane. He then opened up his own successful private practice and became so popular he even gave well attended lectures to the public. He was offered the position as head Austrian Court physician but decided to remain in private practice and research.

== Contributions to phrenology ==
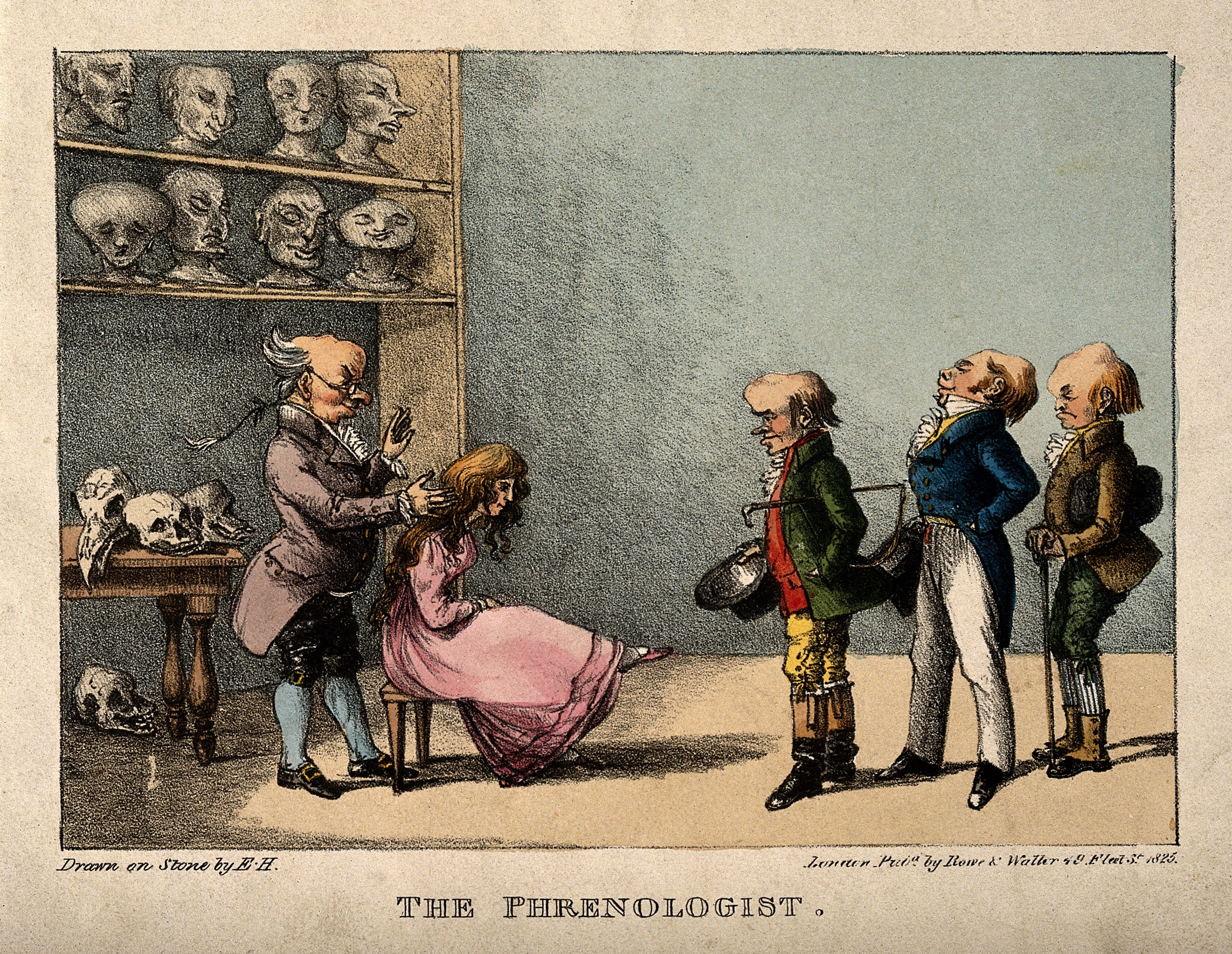
Franz Joseph Gall examining the head of a pretty young girl

Based on his early observations about the skull sizes and facial features of his classmates, Gall developed the theory of Organology and the method of Cranioscopy that would later be known as Phrenology. Gall's version of Organology states that the mind is a collection of independent entities housed within the brain. Cranioscopy is a method to determine the personality and development of mental and moral faculties on the basis of the external shape of the skull. During his lifetime, Gall collected and observed over 120 skulls in order to test his hypotheses.

Gall believed that the bumps and uneven geography of the human skull were caused by pressure exerted from the brain underneath. He divided the brain into sections that corresponded to certain behaviors and traits that he called fundamental faculties. This is referred to as localization of function. Gall believed there were 27 fundamental faculties, among them were: recollection of people, mechanical ability, talent for poetry, love of property, and even a murder instinct. Based on the surface of a person's skull, Gall could make assumptions about that person's fundamental faculties and therefore their character.

Gall disagreed with Philippe Pinel and Peter Camper that the larger brain the larger one's intellectual power. However, after numerous dissections and observations he concluded that a mature skull under 14 inches in circumference was not able to function normally.

== Relationship with Johann Spurzheim ==
In 1800, Johann Spurzheim attended one of Gall's public lectures and was hired as an assistant to help with public medical demonstrations. In 1804, he became Gall's full-time research partner. They worked together for years to develop theories about brain localization and function. In 1813, Spurzheim separated from Gall in order to make a name for himself in Britain. Gall would later accuse Spurzheim of plagiarism and perverting his work. It was Spurzheim who would give the name phrenology to Gall's theories.

== Other achievements ==
Other than his contributions to phrenology, Gall is lesser known for his other achievements. While developing his theories on localization of function, Gall significantly advanced the science of dissection. Instead of slicing randomly, as had been the practice in previous years, Gall's method involved slow exploration of the entire brain structure and the separation of individual fibers. This shift in methodology was extremely influential in future discoveries of the brain.

Gall also researched and theorized about language, communication, and the brain. He argued that pantomime, or the science of gesture, was a universal language for all animals and humans. He believed every living thing was born with the ability to understand gestures on some level.

In 1823, he was elected a foreign member of the Royal Swedish Academy of Sciences.

He published a book titled On the Functions of the Brain and of Each of Its parts: With Observations on the Possibility of Determining the Instincts, Propensities, and Talents, Or the Moral and Intellectual Dispositions of Men and Animals, by the Configuration of the Brain and Head detailing his vast research on brain function and localization. It was translated to English in 1835 by Lewis Winslow.

== Reception and controversy ==
Gall's concepts on brain localization were revolutionary, and led to many religious leaders and scientists to take exception to his theories. The Catholic Church considered his theory as contrary to the established tenets of Catholicism. Established science also condemned these ideas for lack of scientific proof of his theory. Still others attempted to discredit Gall because they believed he had not given rightful credit to the theories and scientists who influenced him. French scientist Étienne-Jean Georget accused Gall of stealing Charles Bonnet's basic idea of brain localization that he had written about over 60 years earlier.

His ideas were also not acceptable to the court of Emperor Joseph II (the brother of Marie Antoinette). The Austrian government accused Gall of being a materialist and banned his ideas because of their threat to public morality. Due to this opposition, Gall left his lecturer position in Austria. He sought a teaching position in Germany and eventually settled in Paris. Revolutionary France was most likely the most hospitable place for Gall's theories. However, Napoleon Bonaparte, the ruling emperor, and the scientific establishment led by the Institute of France, pronounced his science as invalid. Despite all this, Gall was able to secure a comfortable existence on the basis of his speciality. He became a celebrity of sorts as he was accepted into Parisian intellectual salons.

Physiologist Jean Pierre Flourens emerged as one of the sharpest critics of Gall's theories, testing them on animals by removing portions of the brains of dogs, rabbits, and birds to examine how the remaining sections functioned. Flourens published his findings in two separate articles, attacking Gall's theory that the brain acted as discrete parts instead of as a whole unit. One interesting influence was on psychiatry, where the South Italian psychiatrist Biagio Gioacchino Miraglia proposed a new classification of mental illness based on brain functions as they were conceived in Gall's phrenology.

== Legacy ==
In spite of many problems associated with his work, Gall made significant contributions to the field of neurological science. He died in Paris, on 22 August 1828. Although married, he remained childless. Some direct descendants of his brothers lived in Germany until 1949. A collection of his skulls can be seen at the Rollett Museum in Baden bei Wien, Austria, where several of his relatives now live.

Today, phrenology is thought of as a huge mis-step by the scientific community. The idea that a person's personality could be determined by the shape of their skull has been repeatedly disproven. But at the time, Gall's arguments were persuasive and intriguing. Even though phrenology is now known to be incorrect, Gall did set the groundwork for modern neuroscience by spreading the idea of functional localization within the brain.

The misuse of Gall's ideas and work to justify discrimination were deliberately furthered by his associates, including Johann Spurzheim. Later, others tried to improve on his theories with systems such as characterology.

Gall's theories had an influence both on the Italian criminologist Cesare Lombroso and on his French rival, Alexandre Lacassagne. He also influenced the French anatomist, Paul Broca. His work inspired the American Henry Shipton Drayton.
