= Maureilhan =

- Commune
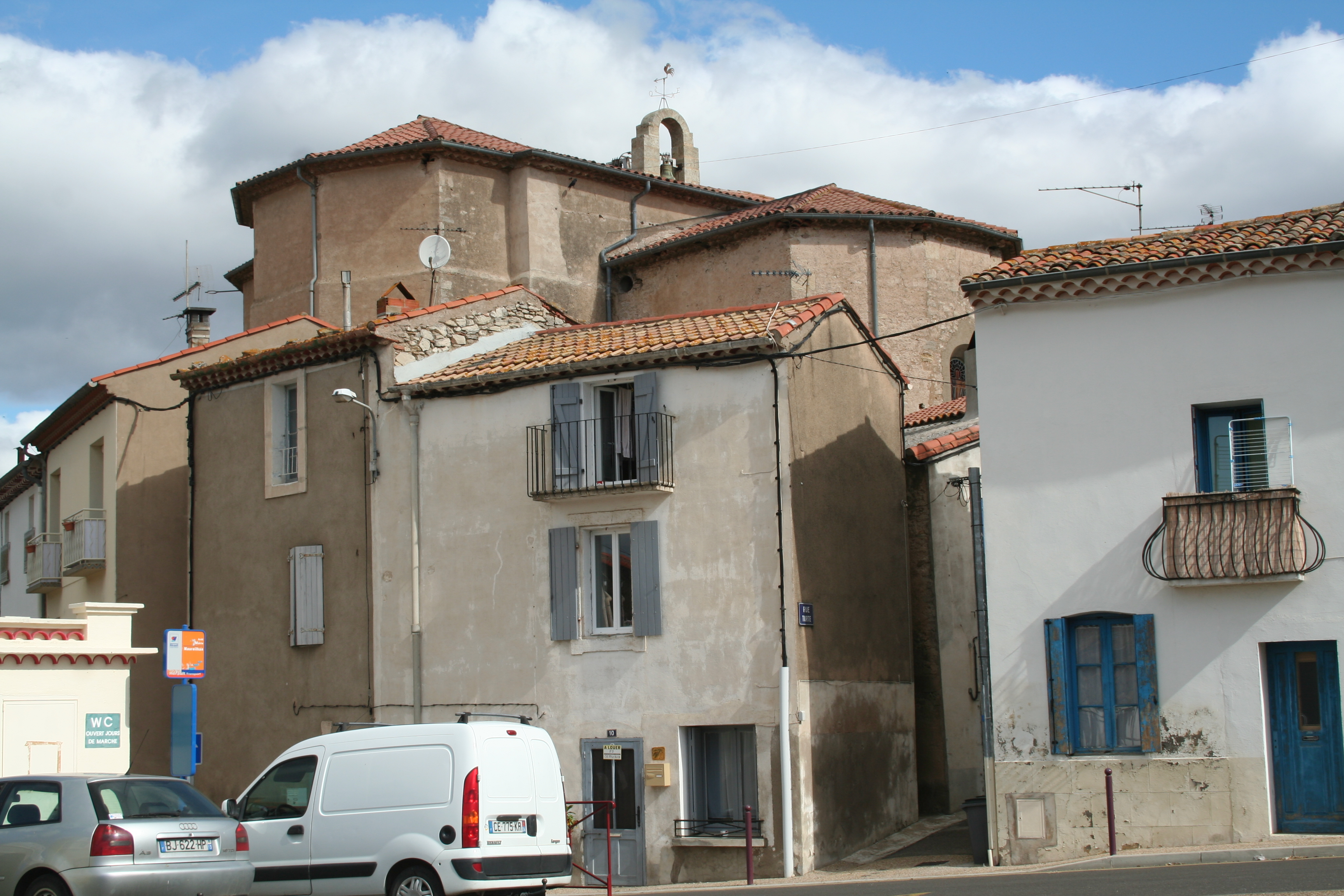
- A view within Maureilhan

- Coat of arms
- Location of Maureilhan
- Location within France Location within Occitanie
- Coordinates: 43°21′29″N 3°07′15″E
- Country: France
- Region: Occitania
- Department: Hérault
- Arrondissement: Béziers
- Canton: Cazouls-lès-Béziers
- Intercommunality: Domitienne

Government
  - Mayor (2020–2026): Christian Seguy
- Area^{1}: 10.55 km^{2} (4.07 sq mi)
- Elevation: 56 m (184 ft)
- Highest elevation: 85 m (279 ft)
- Lowest elevation: 34 m (112 ft)
- Population (2023): 2,495
  - Density: 236.5/km^{2} (612.5/sq mi)
- Time zone: UTC+01:00 (CET)
  - Summer (DST): UTC+02:00 (CEST)
- INSEE/Postal code: 34155 /34370
- ^{1} French Land Register data, which excludes lakes, ponds, glaciers > 1 km^{2} (0.386 sq mi or 247 acres) and river estuaries.

Maureilhan (French pronunciation: [moʁɛjɑ̃]; Occitan: Maurelhan) is a commune in the Hérault department in southern France.

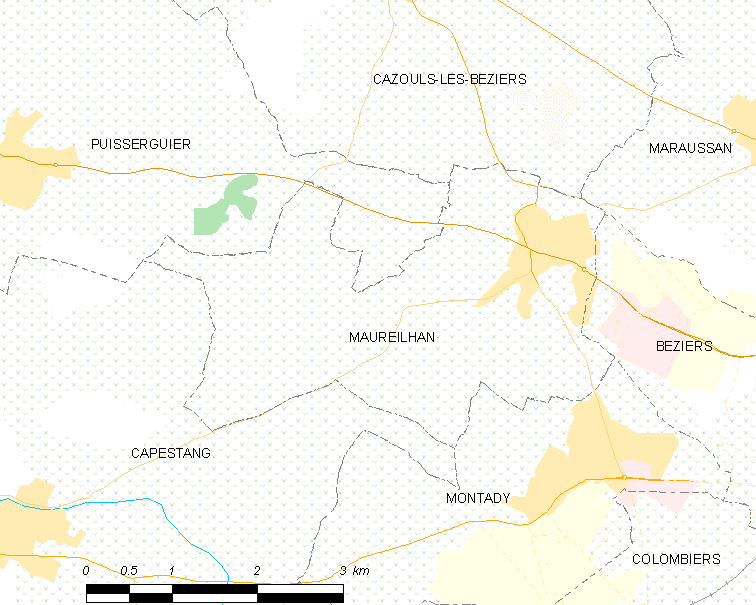
Map

== Population ==
Historical population
Year	Pop.	±% p.a.
1968	1,172	—
1975	1,335	+1.88%
1982	1,298	−0.40%
1990	1,412	+1.06%
1999	1,430	+0.14%
2007	1,716	+2.31%
2012	1,963	+2.73%
2017	2,095	+1.31%
2023	2,495	+2.96%
Source: INSEE

== See also ==
- Communes of the Hérault department
- Musical video clip created by Aurore LASTRE to find 3 general practitioners in the town :
