= Phrenology =

Pseudoscientific study of human skull shape

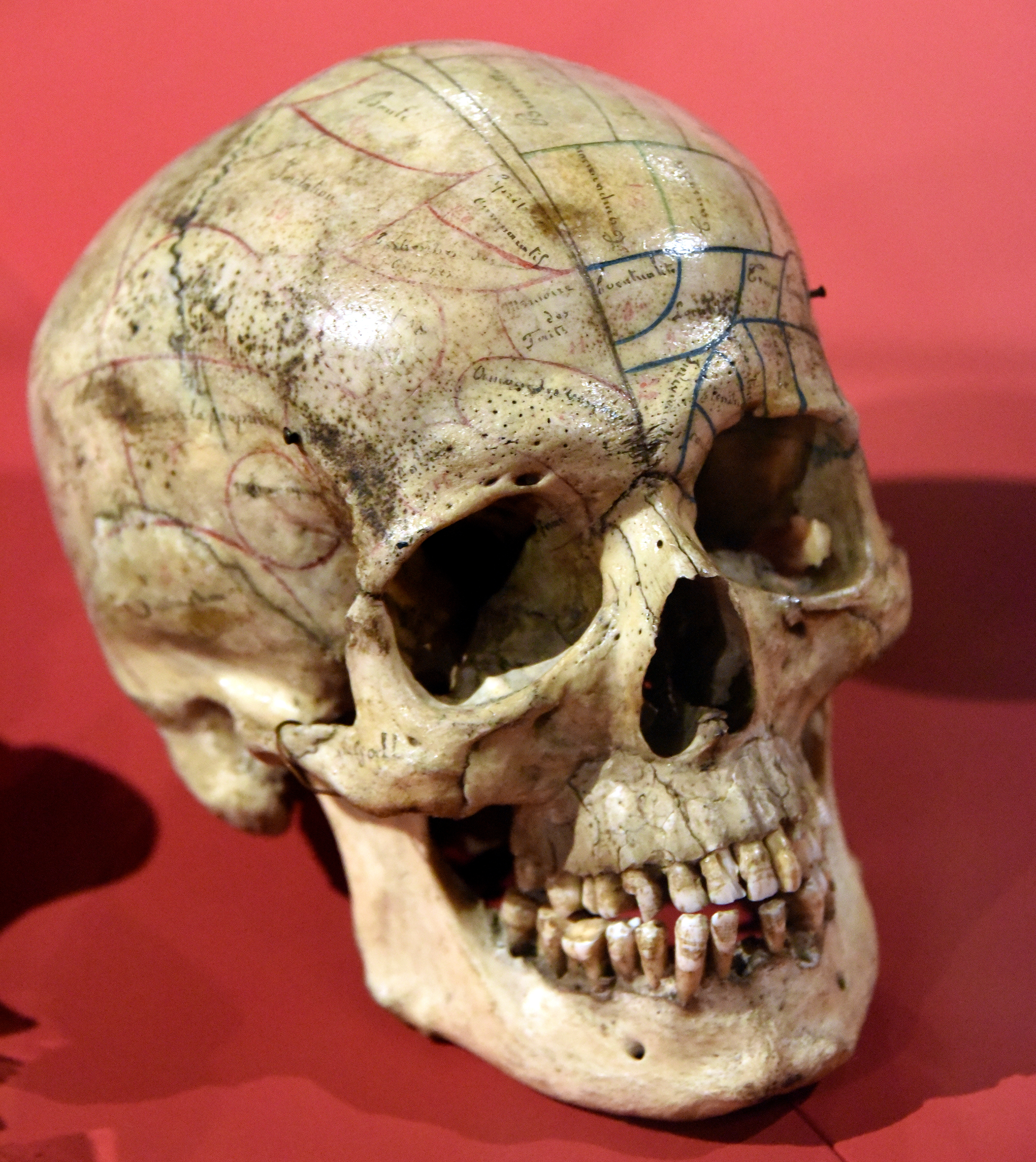
Phrenological skull, European, 19th century. Wellcome Collection, London

Phrenology is a pseudoscience that involves the measurement of bumps on the skull to predict mental traits. It is based on the concept that the brain is the organ of the mind, and that certain brain areas have localized, specific functions or modules. It was said that the brain was composed of different muscles, so those that were used more often were bigger, resulting in the different skull shapes. This provided reasoning for the common presence of bumps on the skull in different locations. The brain "muscles" not being used as frequently remained small and were therefore not present on the exterior of the skull. Although both of those ideas have a basis in reality, phrenology generalizes beyond empirical knowledge in a way that departs from science. The central phrenological notion that measuring the contour of the skull can predict personality traits is discredited by empirical research. Developed by German physician Franz Joseph Gall in 1796, the discipline was influential in the 19th century, especially from about 1810 until 1840. The principal British centre for phrenology was Edinburgh, where the Edinburgh Phrenological Society was established in 1820.

Phrenology is today recognized as pseudoscientific. The methodological rigor of phrenology was doubtful even for the standards of its time, since many authors already regarded phrenology as pseudoscience in the 19th century. There have been various studies conducted that discredited phrenology, most of which were done with ablation techniques. Marie Jean Pierre Flourens demonstrated through ablation that the cerebrum and cerebellum accomplish different functions. He found that the impacted areas never carried out the functions that were proposed through phrenology. Paul Broca also discredited the idea when he discovered and named the "Broca's area": the patient's ability to produce language was lost while their ability to understand language remained intact, due to a lesion on the left frontal lobe. He concluded that this area of the brain was responsible for language production. Between Flourens and Broca, the claims to support phrenology were dismantled. Phrenological thinking was influential in the psychiatry and psychology of the 19th century. Gall's assumption that character, thoughts, and emotions are located in specific areas of the brain is considered an important historical advance toward neuropsychology. He contributed to the idea that the brain is spatially organized, but not in the way he proposed. There is a clear division of labor in the brain but none of which even remotely correlates to the size of the head or the structure of the skull. It contributed to some advancements in understanding the brain and its functions.

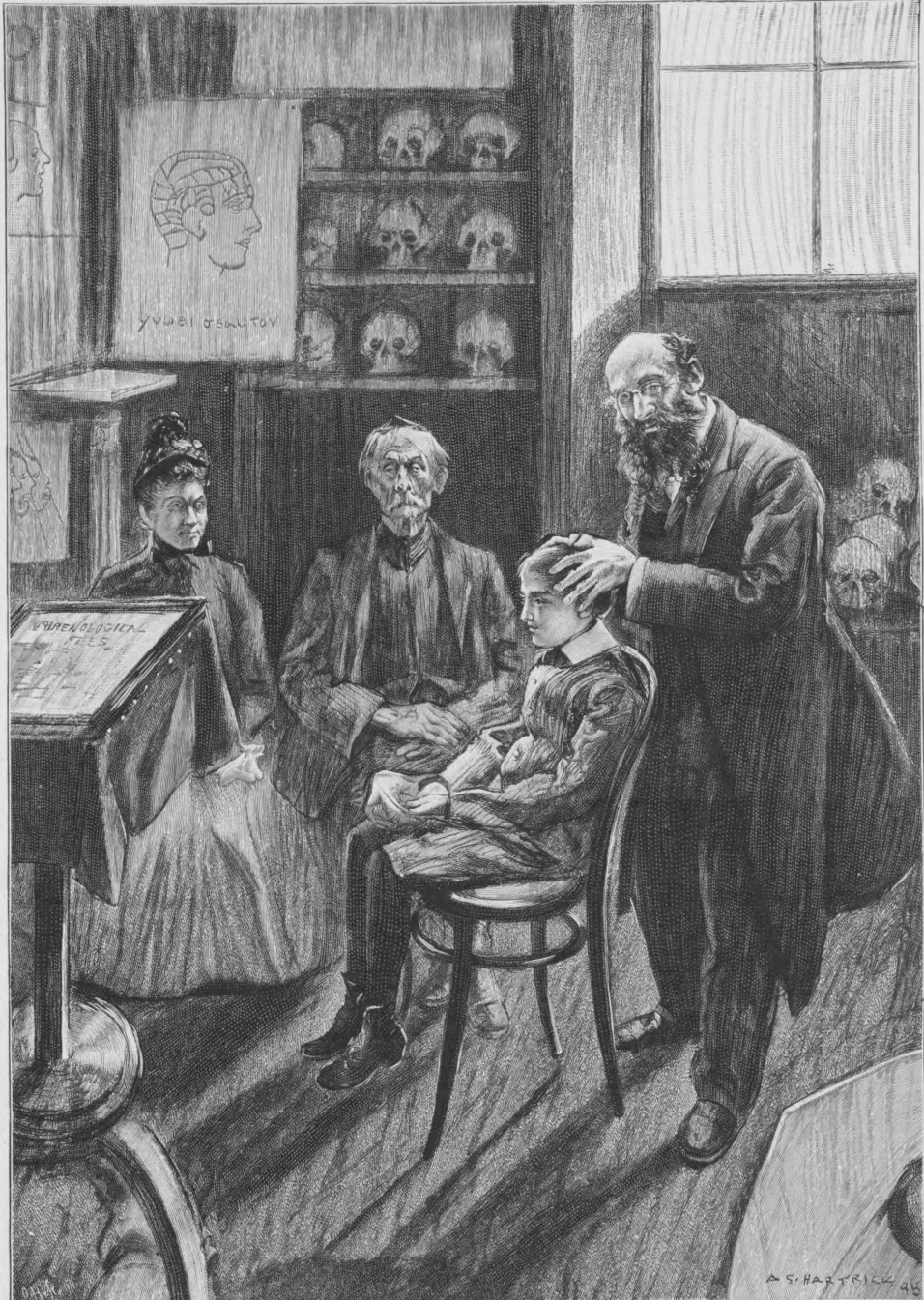
The Phrenologist, a sketch by A.S. Hartrick, 1895

While phrenology itself has long been discredited, the study of the inner surface of the skulls of archaic human species allows modern researchers to obtain information about the development of various areas of the brains of those species, and thereby infer information about their cognitive and communicative abilities, and possibly even about their social lives. Due to its limitations, this technique is sometimes criticized as "paleo-phrenology."

== Etymology ==
The term phrenology, from Ancient Greek φρήν (phrēn) 'mind' and λόγος (logos) 'knowledge', was used in the early 19th century to refer to what would now be considered psychology: a broader study of the mind and human mental faculties. This meaning has been eclipsed by the more specific study of the skull shape to infer psychological traits.

Other terms historically used to discuss this specific relationship between the skull and the mind, and especially Gall's study of them, include craniology, cranioscopy, zoonomy, organology, bumpology and functionalism. Craniology and cranioscopy became detached from the specific sense of phrenology, and were later used to refer merely to the study of the skull, as in anthropology. Many of the other words had or have meanings in other sciences, and their use to refer to the study of phrenology is now archaic.

== Mental faculties ==
Phrenologists believe that the human mind has a set of various mental faculties, each one represented in a different area of the brain. For example, the faculty of "philoprogenitiveness", from the Greek for "love of offspring", was located centrally at the back of the head (see illustration of the chart from Webster's Academic Dictionary).

These areas were said to be proportional to a person's propensities. The importance of an organ was derived from relative size compared to other organs. It was believed that the cranial skull—like a glove on the hand—accommodates to the different sizes of these areas of the brain, so that a person's capacity for a given personality trait could be determined simply by measuring the area of the skull that overlies the corresponding area of the brain.

Phrenology, which focuses on personality and character, is distinct from craniometry, which is the study of skull size, weight and shape, and physiognomy, the study of facial features.

== Method ==
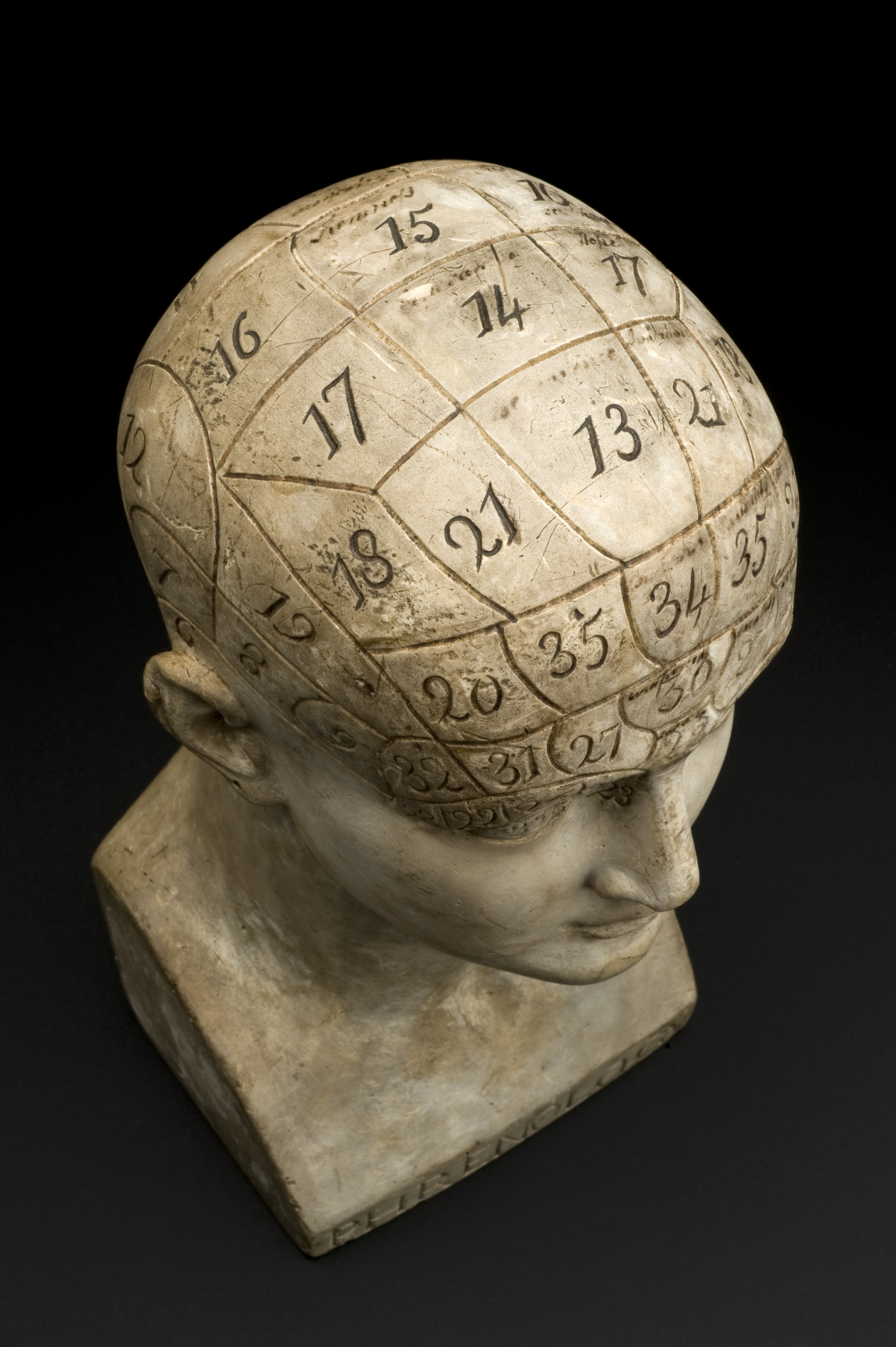
Numbered phrenological bust

Phrenology is a process that involves observing and/or feeling the skull to determine an individual's psychological attributes. Franz Joseph Gall believed that the brain was made up of 27 individual organs that determined personality, the first 19 of these "organs" he believed to exist in other animal species. Phrenologists would run their fingertips and palms over the skulls of their patients to feel for enlargements or indentations. The phrenologist would often take measurements with a tape measure of the overall head size and more rarely employ a craniometer, a special version of a caliper. In general, instruments to measure sizes of cranium continued to be used after the mainstream phrenology had ended. The phrenologists put emphasis on using drawings of individuals with particular traits, to determine the character of the person and thus many phrenology books show pictures of subjects. From absolute and relative sizes of the skull the phrenologist would assess the character and temperament of the patient.

Gall's list of the "brain organs" was specific. An enlarged organ meant that the patient used that particular "organ" extensively. The number—and more detailed meanings—of organs were added later by other phrenologists. The 27 areas varied in function, from sense of color, to religiosity, to being combative or destructive. Each of the 27 "brain organs" was located under a specific area of the skull. As a phrenologist felt the skull, he would use his knowledge of the shapes of heads and organ positions to determine the overall natural strengths and weaknesses of an individual. Phrenologists believed the head revealed natural tendencies but not absolute limitations or strengths of character. The first phrenological chart gave the names of the organs described by Gall; it was a single sheet, and sold for a cent. Later charts were more expansive.

== History ==
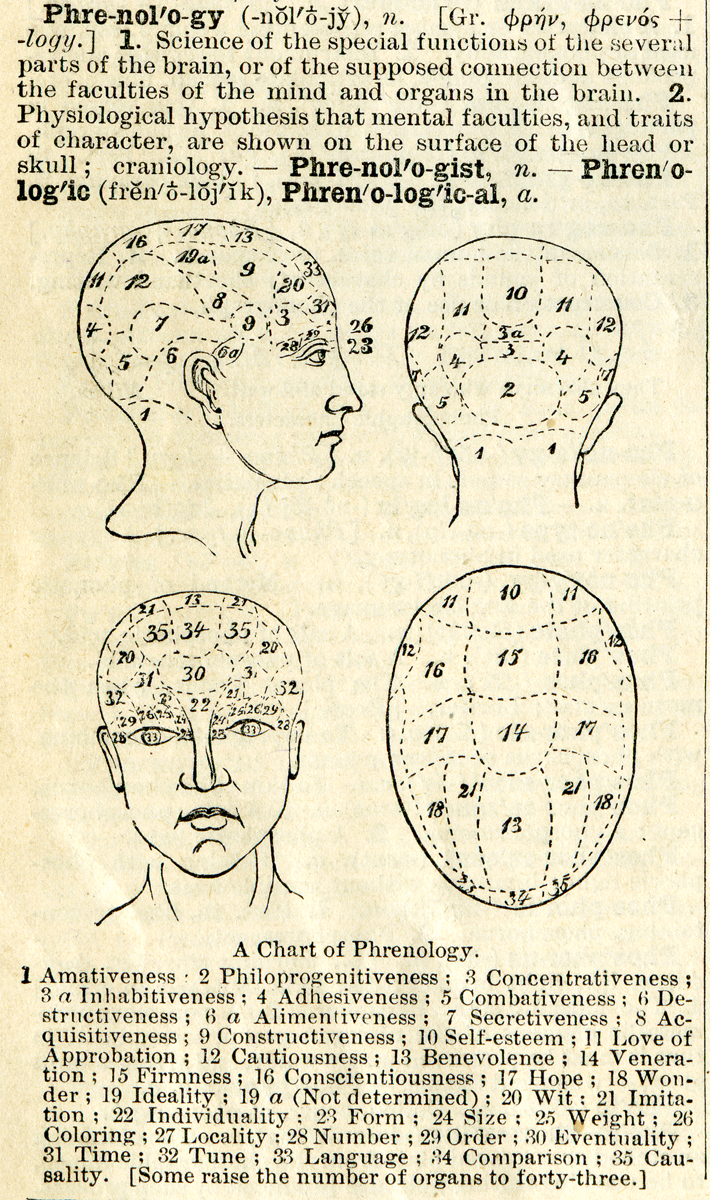
A definition of phrenology with chart from Webster's Academic Dictionary, c. 1895

Among the first to identify the brain as the major controlling center for the body were Hippocrates and his followers, inaugurating a major change in thinking from Egyptian, biblical and early Greek views, which based bodily primacy of control on the heart. This belief was supported by the Greek physician Galen, who concluded that mental activity occurred in the brain rather than the heart, contending that the brain, a cold, moist organ formed of sperm, was the seat of the animal soul—one of three "souls" found in the body, each associated with a principal organ.

The Swiss pastor Johann Kaspar Lavater (1741–1801) introduced the idea that physiognomy related to the specific character traits of individuals, rather than general types, in his Physiognomische Fragmente, published between 1775 and 1778. His work was translated into English and published in 1832 as The Pocket Lavater, or, The Science of Physiognomy. He believed that thoughts of the mind and passions of the soul were connected with an individual's external frame.

Of the forehead, When the forehead is perfectly perpendicular, from the hair to the eyebrows, it denotes an utter deficiency of understanding. (p. 24)

In 1796 the German physician Franz Joseph Gall (1758–1828) began lecturing on organology: the isolation of mental faculties and later cranioscopy which involved reading the skull's shape as it pertained to the individual. It was Gall's collaborator Johann Gaspar Spurzheim who would popularize the term "phrenology".

In 1809 Gall began writing his principal work, The Anatomy and Physiology of the Nervous System in General, and of the Brain in Particular, with Observations upon the possibility of ascertaining the several Intellectual and Moral Dispositions of Man and Animal, by the configuration of their Heads. It was not published until 1819. In the introduction to this main work, Gall makes the following statement in regard to his doctrinal principles, which comprise the intellectual basis of phrenology:

- The brain is the organ of the mind
- The brain is not a homogenous unity, but an aggregate of mental organs with specific functions
- The cerebral organs are topographically localized
- Other things being equal, the relative size of any particular mental organ is indicative of the power or strength of that organ
- Since the skull ossifies over the brain during infant development, external craniological means could be used to diagnose the internal states of the mental characters

Through careful observation and extensive experimentation, Gall believed he had established a relationship between aspects of character, called faculties, with precise organs in the brain.

Johann Spurzheim was Gall's most important collaborator. He worked as Gall's anatomist until 1813 when for unknown reasons they had a permanent falling out. Publishing under his own name Spurzheim successfully disseminated phrenology throughout the United Kingdom during his lecture tours through 1814 and 1815 and the United States in 1832 where he would eventually die.

Gall was more concerned with creating a physical science, so it was through Spurzheim that phrenology was first spread throughout Europe and America. Phrenology, while not universally accepted, was hardly a fringe phenomenon of the era. George Combe would become the chief promoter of phrenology throughout the English-speaking world after he viewed a brain dissection by Spurzheim, convincing him of phrenology's merits.

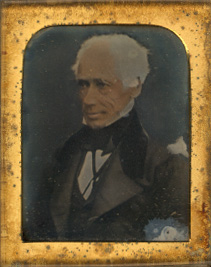
George Combe

The popularization of phrenology in the middle and working classes was due in part to the idea that scientific knowledge was important and an indication of sophistication and modernity. Cheap and plentiful pamphlets, as well as the growing popularity of scientific lectures as entertainment, also helped spread phrenology to the masses. Combe created a system of philosophy of the human mind that became popular with the masses because of its simplified principles and wide range of social applications that were in harmony with the liberal Victorian world view. George Combe's book On the Constitution of Man and its Relationship to External Objects sold more than 200,000 copies through nine editions. Combe also devoted a large portion of his book to reconciling religion and phrenology, which had long been a sticking point. Another reason for its popularity was that phrenology balanced between free will and determinism. A person's inherent faculties were clear, and no faculty was viewed as evil, though the abuse of a faculty was. Phrenology allowed for self-improvement and upward mobility, while providing fodder for attacks on aristocratic privilege. Phrenology also had wide appeal because of its being a reformist philosophy not a radical one. Phrenology was not limited to the common people, and both Queen Victoria and Prince Albert invited George Combe to read the heads of their children.

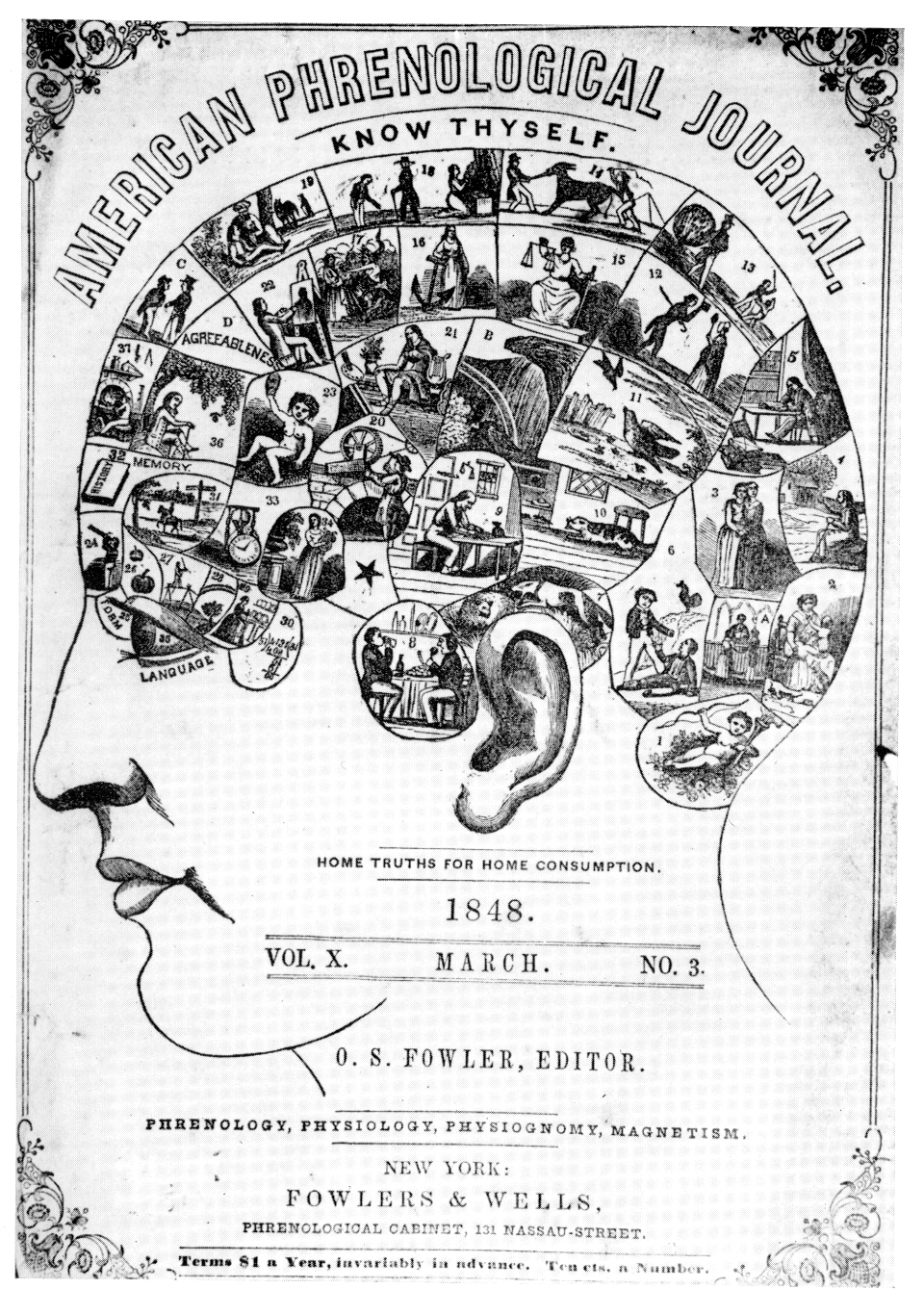
1848 edition of American Phrenological Journal published by Fowlers & Wells, New York

The American brothers Lorenzo Niles Fowler (1811–1896) and Orson Squire Fowler (1809–1887) were leading phrenologists of their time. Orson, together with associates Samuel Robert Wells and Nelson Sizer, ran the phrenological business and publishing house Fowlers & Wells in New York City. Meanwhile, Lorenzo spent much of his life in England, where he initiated the famous phrenological publishing house L. N. Fowler & Co. and gained considerable fame with his phrenology head (a china head showing the phrenological faculties), which has become a symbol of the discipline. Orson Fowler was known for his octagonal house.

Phrenology came about at a time when scientific procedures and standards for acceptable evidence were still being codified. In the context of Victorian society, phrenology was a respectable scientific theory. The Phrenological Society of Edinburgh founded by George and Andrew Combe was an example of the credibility of phrenology at the time, and included a number of extremely influential social reformers and intellectuals, including the publisher Robert Chambers, the astronomer John Pringle Nichol, the evolutionary environmentalist Hewett Cottrell Watson, and asylum reformer William A. F. Browne. In 1826, out of the 120 members of the Edinburgh society an estimated one third were from a medical background. By the 1840s there were more than 28 phrenological societies in London with more than 1,000 members. Another important scholar was Luigi Ferrarese, the leading Italian phrenologist. He advocated that governments should embrace phrenology as a scientific means of conquering many social ills, and his Memorie Riguardanti La Dottrina Frenologica (1836), is considered "one of the fundamental 19th-century works in the field".

Traditionally the mind had been studied through introspection. Phrenology provided an attractive, biological alternative that attempted to unite all mental phenomena using consistent biological terminology. Gall's approach prepared the way for studying the mind that would lead to the downfall of his own theories. Phrenology contributed to development of physical anthropology, forensic medicine, knowledge of the nervous system and brain anatomy as well as contributing to applied psychology.

John Elliotson was a brilliant but erratic heart specialist who became a phrenologist in the 1840s. He was also a mesmerist and combined the two into something he called phrenomesmerism or phrenomagnatism. Changing behaviour through mesmerism eventually won out in Elliotson's hospital, putting phrenology in a subordinate role. Others amalgamated phrenology and mesmerism as well, such as the practical phrenologists Collyer and Joseph R. Buchanan. The benefit of combining mesmerism and phrenology was that the trance the patient was placed in was supposed to allow for the manipulation of his/her penchants and qualities. For example, if the organ of self-esteem was touched, the subject would take on a haughty expression.

Phrenology has been psychology's great faux pas.

— J.C. Flugel (1933)

Phrenology was mostly discredited as a scientific theory by the 1840s. This was due only in part to a growing amount of evidence against phrenology. Phrenologists had never been able to agree on the most basic mental organ numbers, going from 27 to over 40, and had difficulty locating the mental organs. Phrenologists relied on cranioscopic readings of the skull to find organ locations. Jean Pierre Flourens' experiments on the brains of pigeons indicated that the loss of parts of the brain either caused no loss of function, or the loss of a completely different function than what had been attributed to it by phrenology. Flourens' experiment, while not perfect, seemed to indicate that Gall's supposed organs were imaginary. Scientists had also become disillusioned with phrenology since its exploitation with the middle and working classes by entrepreneurs. The popularization had resulted in the simplification of phrenology and mixing in it of principles of physiognomy, which had from the start been rejected by Gall as an indicator of personality. Phrenology from its inception was tainted by accusations of promoting materialism and atheism, and being destructive of morality. These were all factors that led to the downfall of phrenology. Recent studies, using modern day technology like Magnetic Resonance Imaging have further disproven phrenology claims.

During the early 20th century, a revival of interest in phrenology occurred, partly because of studies of evolution, criminology and anthropology (as pursued by Cesare Lombroso). The most famous British phrenologist of the 20th century was the London psychiatrist Bernard Hollander (1864–1934). His main works, The Mental Function of the Brain (1901) and Scientific Phrenology (1902), are an appraisal of Gall's teachings. Hollander introduced a quantitative approach to the phrenological diagnosis, defining a method for measuring the skull, and comparing the measurements with statistical averages.

In Belgium, Paul Bouts (1900–1999) began studying phrenology from a pedagogical background, using the phrenological analysis to define an individual pedagogy. Combining phrenology with typology and graphology, he coined a global approach known as psychognomy. Bouts, a Roman Catholic priest, became the main promoter of renewed 20th-century interest in phrenology and psychognomy in Belgium. He was also active in Brazil and Canada, where he founded institutes for characterology. His works Psychognomie and Les Grandioses Destinées individuelle et humaine dans la lumière de la Caractérologie et de l'Evolution cérébro-cranienne are considered standard works in the field. In the latter work, which examines the subject of paleoanthropology, Bouts developed a teleological and orthogenetical view on a perfecting evolution, from the paleo-encephalical skull shapes of prehistoric man, which he considered still prevalent in criminals and savages, towards a higher form of mankind, thus perpetuating phrenology's problematic racializing of the human frame. Bouts died on March 7, 1999. His work has been continued by the Dutch foundation PPP (Per Pulchritudinem in Pulchritudine), operated by Anette Müller, one of Bouts' students.

During the 1930s, Belgian colonial authorities in Rwanda used phrenology to explain the purported superiority of Tutsis over Hutus.

== Application ==
=== Racism ===
Some scientists believed phrenology affirmed European superiority over other races. By comparing skulls of different ethnic groups it was thought to allow for ranking of races from least to most evolved. Broussais, a disciple of Gall, proclaimed that the Caucasians were the most beautiful, while peoples like the Australian Aboriginal and Māori would never become civilized since "they had no cerebral organ for producing great artists". Few phrenologists argued for the emancipation of the slaves, while many used it to advocate for slavery. Instead they argued that through education and interbreeding the "lesser peoples" could improve. Another argument was that the natural inequality of people could be used to situate them in the most appropriate place in society.

=== Gender stereotyping ===
Gender stereotyping was also common with phrenology. Women, whose heads were generally larger in the back with lower foreheads, were thought to have underdeveloped organs necessary for success in the arts and sciences while having larger mental organs relating to the care of children and religion. While phrenologists did not contest the existence of talented women, this minority did not provide justification for citizenship or participation in politics.

The popularly held phrenological belief in the Victorian era was that women's brains were smaller and weaker than those of men and as such were incapable of being practitioners themselves. Evidence from letters written by the phrenologists Johann Spurzheim to his wife, Honorine Spurzheim, suggest that he had a number of women attending his lectures that were interested in phrenology. He held the belief that women did not have necessary "superiority of intellectual powers". Despite this, many middle class women were just as captivated by the pseudoscience as their male counterparts. Contributions to the field of phrenology would be made by prominent figures such as Lydia Folger Fowler, the second American woman ever to receive a medical degree, who created character charts and lectured extensively on the subject.

Phrenology had an appeal to middle class women as a chance to understand their own minds and "know thyself" by creating charts that were very clear evidence for the organs of intellect being just as prominent in their brains as they were in men's.

=== Education ===
One of the considered practical applications of phrenology was education. Due to the nature of phrenology people were naturally considered unequal, as very few people would have a naturally perfect balance between organs. Thus education would play an important role in creating a balance through rigorous exercise of beneficial organs while repressing baser ones. One of the best examples of this is Félix Voisin, who, for approximately ten years, ran a reform school in Issy for the express purpose of correction of the mind of children who had suffered some hardship. Voisin focused on four categories of children for his reform school:

- Slow learners
- Spoiled, neglected, or harshly treated children
- Willful, disorderly children
- Children at high risk of inheriting mental disorders

=== Criminology ===
Phrenology was one of the first to bring about the idea of rehabilitation of criminals instead of vindictive punishments that would not stop criminals, only with the reorganizing a disorganized brain would bring about change. Voisin believed along with others the accuracy of phrenology in diagnosing criminal tendencies. Diagnosis could point to the type of offender, the insane, an idiot or brute, and by knowing this an appropriate course of action could be taken. A strict system of reward and punishment, hard work and religious instruction, was thought to be able to correct those who had been abandoned and neglected with little education and moral ground works. Those who were considered intellectually disabled could be put to work and housed collectively while only criminals of intellect and vicious intent needed to be confined and isolated. Phrenology also advocated variable prison sentences, the idea being that those who were only defective in education and lacking in morals would soon be released while those who were "mentally deficient" could be watched and the truly abhorrent criminals would never be released. For other patients phrenology could help redirect impulses, one homicidal individual became a butcher to control his impulses, while another became a military chaplain so he could witness killings. Phrenology also provided reformist arguments for the lunatic asylums of the Victorian era. John Conolly, a physician interested in psychological aspects of disease, used phrenology on his patients in an attempt to use it as a diagnostic tool. While the success of this approach is debatable, Conolly, through phrenology, introduced a more humane way of dealing with the mentally ill. The first phrenological testimony in a court of law was solicited by American lawyer John Neal in Portland, Maine, in 1834. Neal argued unsuccessfully that the jury should take leniency on his client because the part of his brain associated with violent behavior was inflamed.

=== Psychiatry ===
In psychiatry, phrenology was proposed as a viable model in order to the disciplinary field. The South Italian psychiatrist Biagio Miraglia proposed a new classification of mental illness based on brain functions as they were described by Gall. In Miraglia's view, madness is consequent to dysfunctions of the cerebral organs: "The organs of the brain that may become ill in isolation or in complex get their activities infected through energy, or depression, or inertia or deficiency. So the madness can take the appearance of these three characteristic forms; i.e. for enhanced activity, or for depressed activity, or for inertia or deficiency of brain activities".

=== Psychology ===
In the Victorian era, phrenology as a psychology was taken seriously and permeated the literature and novels of the day. Many prominent public figures, such as the Reverend Henry Ward Beecher (a college classmate and initial partner of Orson Fowler) promoted phrenology actively as a source of psychological insight and self-knowledge. In Europe and the United States, many people visited phrenologists to have their heads analysed. After such an examination, clients received a written delineation of their character or a standardized chart with their score, combined with advice on how to improve themselves. People also consulted phrenologists for advice in matters such as hiring personnel or finding suitable marriage partners. As such, phrenology as a brain science waned but developed into the popular psychology of the 19th century.

== Reception ==
=== Great Britain ===
Phrenology was introduced at a time when the old theological and philosophical understanding of the mind was being questioned and no longer seemed adequate in a society that was experiencing rapid social and demographic changes. Phrenology became one of the most popular movements of the Victorian Era. In part phrenology's success was due to George Combe tailoring phrenology for the middle class. Combe's book On the Constitution of Man and its Relationship to External Objects was one of the most popular of the time, selling over two hundred thousand copies in a ten-year period. Phrenology's success was also partly because it was introduced at a time when scientific lectures were becoming a form of middle-class entertainment, exposing a large demographic of people to phrenological ideas who would not have heard them otherwise. As a result of the changing times, new avenues of exposure and its multifaceted appeal, phrenology flourished in popular culture although it was discredited as scientific theory by 1840.

=== France ===
While still not a fringe movement, there was not popular widespread support of phrenology in France. This was not only due to strong opposition to phrenology by French scholars but also once again accusations of promoting atheism, materialism and radical religious views. Politics in France also played a role in preventing rapid spread of phrenology. In Britain phrenology had provided another tool to be used for situating demographic changes; the difference was there was less fear of revolutionary upheaval in Britain compared with France. Given that most French supporters of phrenology were liberal, left-wing or socialist, it was an objective of the social elite of France, who held a restrained vision of social change, that phrenology remain on the fringes. Another objection was that phrenology seemed to provide a built in excuse for criminal behaviour, since in its original form it was essentially deterministic in nature.

=== Ireland ===
Phrenology arrived in Ireland in 1815, through Spurzheim. While Ireland largely mirrored British trends, with scientific lectures and demonstrations becoming a popular pastime of the age, by 1815 phrenology had already been ridiculed in some circles priming the audiences to its skeptical claims. Because of this the general public valued it more for its comic relief than anything else; however, it did find an audience in the rational dissenters who found it an attractive alternative to explain human motivations without the attached superstitions of religion. The supporters of phrenology in Ireland were relegated to scientific subcultures because the Irish scholars neglected marginal movements like phrenology, denying it scientific support in Ireland. In 1830 George Combe came to Ireland, his self-promotion barely winning out against his lack of medical expertise, still only drawing lukewarm crowds. This was due to not only the Vatican's decree that phrenology was subversive of religion and morality but also that, based on phrenology, the "Irish Catholics were sui generis a flawed and degenerate breed". Because of the lack of scientific support, along with religious and prejudicial reasons, phrenology never found a wide audience in Ireland.

=== United States ===
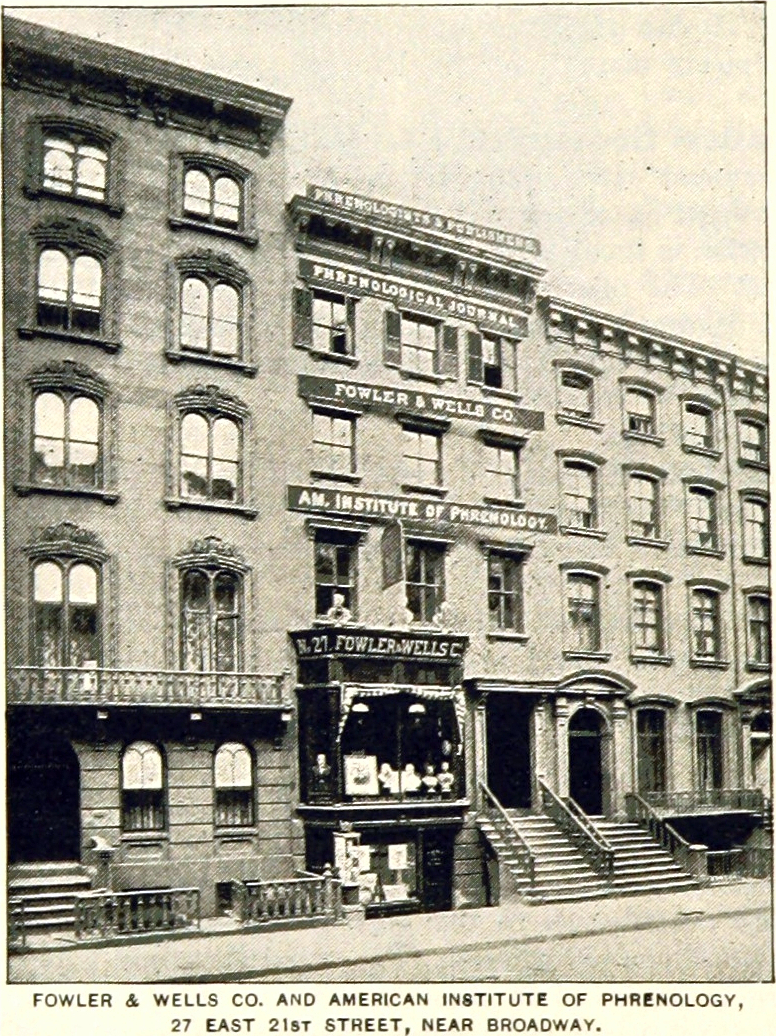
American Institute of Phrenology (New York, 1893)

The first publication in the United States in support of phrenology was published by John Bell, who reissued Combe's essays with an introductory discourse, in 1822. The following year, John G. Wells of Bowdoin College "commenced an annual exposition, and recommendation of its doctrines, to his class". In 1834, John D. Godman, professor of anatomy at Rutgers Medical College, emphatically defended phrenology when he wrote:

It is, however, allowable to take as a principle, that there will be a relation betwixt vigour of intellect and perfection of form; and that, therefore, history will direct us to the original and chief family of mankind. We therefore ask, which are the nations that have excelled and figured in history, not only as conquerors, but as forwarding, by their improvements in arts and sciences, the progress of human knowledge?

Phrenological teachings had become a widespread popular movement by 1834, when Combe came to lecture in the United States. Sensing commercial possibilities men like the Fowlers became phrenologists and sought additional ways to bring phrenology to the masses. Though a popular movement, the intellectual elite of the United States found phrenology attractive because it provided a biological explanation of mental processes based on observation, yet it was not accepted uncritically. Some intellectuals accepted organology while questioning cranioscopy. Gradually the popular success of phrenology undermined its scientific merits in the United States and elsewhere, along with its materialistic underpinnings, fostering radical religious views. There was increasing evidence to refute phrenological claims, and by the 1840s it had largely lost its credibility. In the United States, especially in the South, phrenology faced an additional obstacle in the antislavery movement. While phrenologists usually claimed the superiority of the European race, they were often sympathetic to liberal causes including the antislavery movement; this sowed skepticism about phrenology among those who were pro-slavery. The rise and surge in popularity in mesmerism, phrenomesmerism, also had a hand in the loss of interest in phrenology among intellectuals and the general public.

John Brown Jr., son of the abolitionist John Brown, travelled for a time as a lecturer on phrenology.

=== South Africa ===
Upon arrival in South Africa, phrenology clashed with the liberalist Cape residents, among whom were missionaries, merchants, and middle class, that held staunch beliefs in the equality of the human race in all varieties. They were advocates for theories of environmental racial differences rather than the phrenological held belief in innate differences of the mind between Africans and Europeans. Nonetheless, South Africa became the place where a lot of phrenologists, particularly in Britain, were receiving subjects to study the heads of Africans. Thomas Pringle was a friend of Combe and Mackenzie who was sending the skulls of Xhosa and Bushman indigenous tribes-people back to a friend in London, John Epps while doing field research in the Cape. Pringle was just one of many medical and military men on the frontier of the South Africa territory that were taking sample of local Africans and sending them back to Britain as patrons of phrenology. Liberals of South Africa would continue to remain skeptical of the validity of phrenology as it pertained to the pre-determining of ones character based on organs in their brain. Editor A.J. Ardine for the periodical A Catechism of Phrenology would add that he "remained unconvinced by the new science".

While residents of the Western coastal urban regions of South Africa were skeptical of the ideological beliefs behind phrenology, those on the inland frontier were very receptive to the ideas of "biological determinism". Andrew Smith, better known as the founder of zoology, as well as Robert Knox were among these frontiersmen who were supportive and adherent to the ethnological implications of phrenology. Many phrenologists who came to South Africa, or took example from the native people there, would use findings to fuel more racist implications of the pseudoscience. Bushmen and other African people that had the misfortune of living on the frontier were subject to being remarked as similar "to that of the monkey" in facial structure. They had effectively become targets for European imperialist that sought to prove the superiority of their civilization through one sided field work. The inherent issue with their world view was that they conceived these ideas in Europe before coming to Africa on a mission to seek confirmation bias for their rhetoric.

== Specific phrenological modules ==
From Combe:

=== Propensities ===
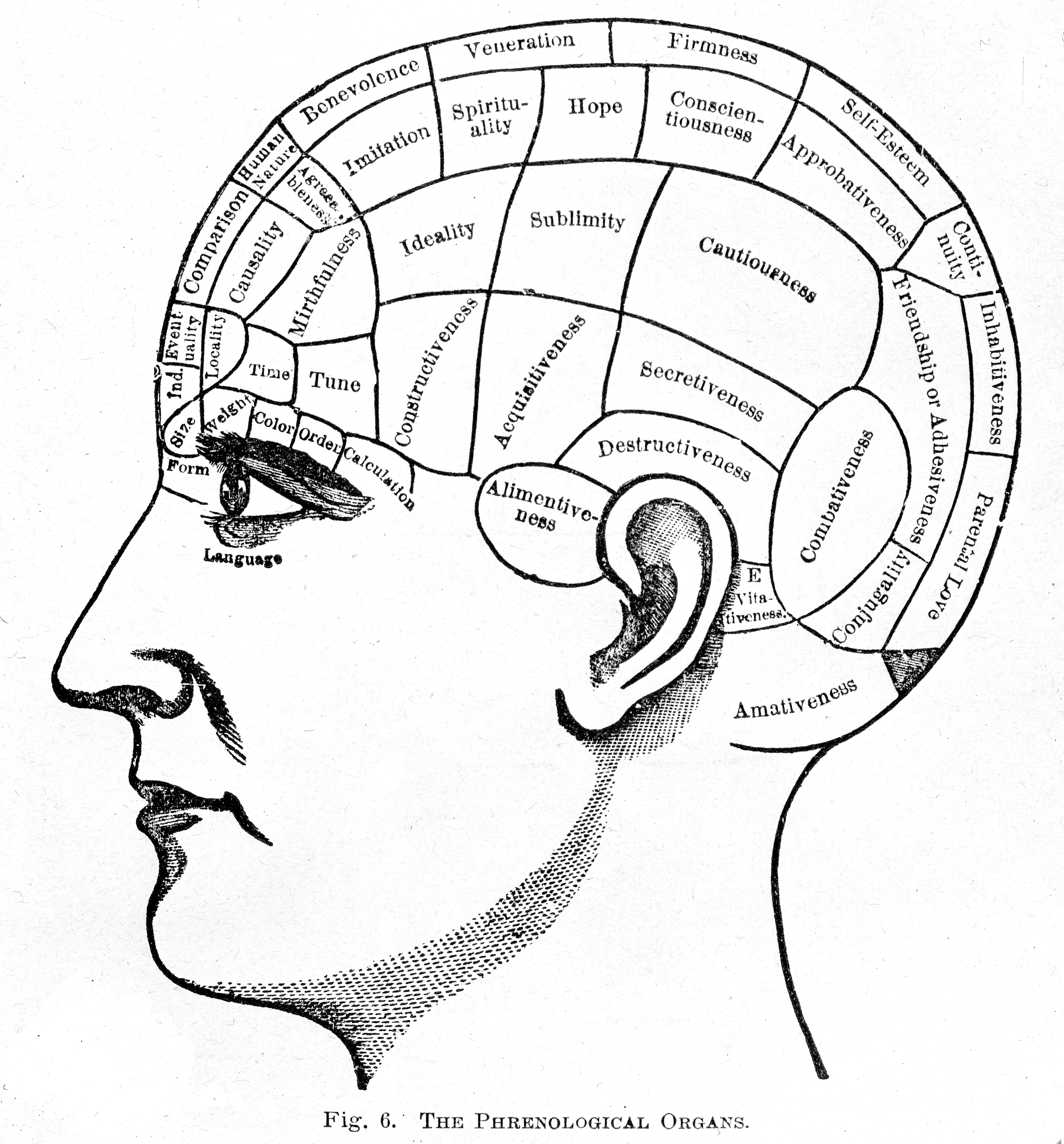
An 1887 phrenology chart

Propensities do not form ideas; they solely produce propensities common to animals and man.

- Adhesiveness
- Alimentiveness
- Amativeness
- Acquisitiveness
- Causality
- Cautiousness
- Combativeness
- Concentrativeness
- Constructiveness
- Destructiveness
- Ideality
- Love of life
- Philoprogenitiveness
- Secretiveness

=== Sentiments ===
Lower sentiments

These are common to man and animal.

- Cautiousness
- Love of approbation
- Self-esteem
- Truthfulness

Superior sentiments

These produce emotion or feeling lacking in animals.

- Benevolence
- Conscientiousness
- Firmness
- Hope
- Ideality
- Imitation
- Veneration
- Wit or Mirthfulness
- Wonder

=== Intellectual faculties ===
These are to know the external world and physical qualities.

- Coloring
- Eventuality
- Form
- Hearing
- Individuality
- Language
- Locality
- Number
- Order
- Sight
- Size
- Smell
- Taste
- Time
- Touch
- Tune
- Weight

=== Reflecting faculties ===
These produce ideas of relation or reflect. They minister to the direction and gratification of all the other powers:

- Causality
- Comparison

== Phrenology as popular science ==
Part of phrenology's rise in popularity was the availability of ideas from scholars that were shared throughout the nineteenth century. Various societies all over Europe and in the United States kept the middle class well informed on the developments in the pseudoscientific field of research by way of regularly publishing journals.

One of the earliest publications of phrenology was George Combe's Phrenological Journal which sat among other books, pamphlets, and articles he published in order to popularize the pseudoscience. As mentioned previously, phrenology had a wide reach and a multi-faceted appeal from nobility to working class, and this would be his breakthrough publication in Great Britain. The most compelling argument Combe would make for the superiority of European nations and people over that of the rest of the world would be in an article he published titled "On the Cerebral Development of Nations". In this publication he determined that the reason Africa, Asian, and American Indians had never had a superior civilization due to "their inherent mental deficiencies".

The Edinburgh Phrenological Society had their own scholarly journal called the Phrenological Journal and Miscellany which ran from 1823 to 1847. This was highly influential and the most highly sought after publication to read on phrenology in the British provinces in the early nineteenth century.

== Influences on popular culture ==
Several literary critics have noted the influence of phrenology (and physiognomy) in Edgar Allan Poe's fiction.

Phrenology (2002) by the Roots was named so after group member Black Thought saw an article in a scientific journal and the group "appropriated the term, not only for its political irony ..."

Phrenology, as well as physiognomy appears in a number of popular Victorian-era media and journal publications such as Dracula and The Picture of Dorian Gray. In both of these works, the villains are shown to have the face of evil and it is heavily implied that the facial structure of characters can lead to some sort of conclusion as to the nature of their character. Works such as these gave the pseudoscience validation, and shows how far spread and influential its implications about the way people act being connected to their head structure truly were.

In Django Unchained (2012), plantation owner Calvin Candie uses the pseudoscientific practice of phrenology to justify white supremacy and the enslavement of Black people.

== Phrenology's decline in popularity ==
A popular contemporary argument for the decline of phrenology was an inherent problem with its wider reach to groups of people that construed it for their own agenda. Each new iteration that it went through, as it was constantly being picked up and interpreted, it strayed farther from scientific structure.

As early as the 1840's, phrenology had its fair share of critics from other scientists and philosophical thinkers of the time. Clergymen in particular protested against the human mind being reduced to a secular, materialistic thing that could be understood without the notion of a soul.

== See also ==
- Anthropometry – Measurement of the human individual
- Boston Phrenological Society
- Brodmann's areas – 52 distinct regions of the brain's cerebral cortex
- Characterology – Academic study of character
- Localization of brain function – Theory that regions of the brain are specialized for functions
- Metoposcopy – Art of divining a person's future from the lines on their forehead
- Moral insanity – Obsolete term for type of mental disorder
- Neuroepistemology – Field of study
- Neuro-imaging – Set of techniques to measure and visualize aspects of the nervous system
- Onychomancy – Form of divination using fingernails
- Palmistry – Foretelling the future through the study of the palm
- Pathognomy – Study of expressed emotions
- Phreno-magnetism – Pseudo-scientific phenomenon discovered by Robert Hanham Collyer in 1839
- Psychograph – Phrenology machine
- Racial policy of Nazi Germany – Set of laws implemented in Nazi Germany
- The Zoist – Academic journal devoted to pseudoscientific concepts
