= St. Mark's Episcopal Church (Hoosick Falls, New York) =

Historic church in New York, United States

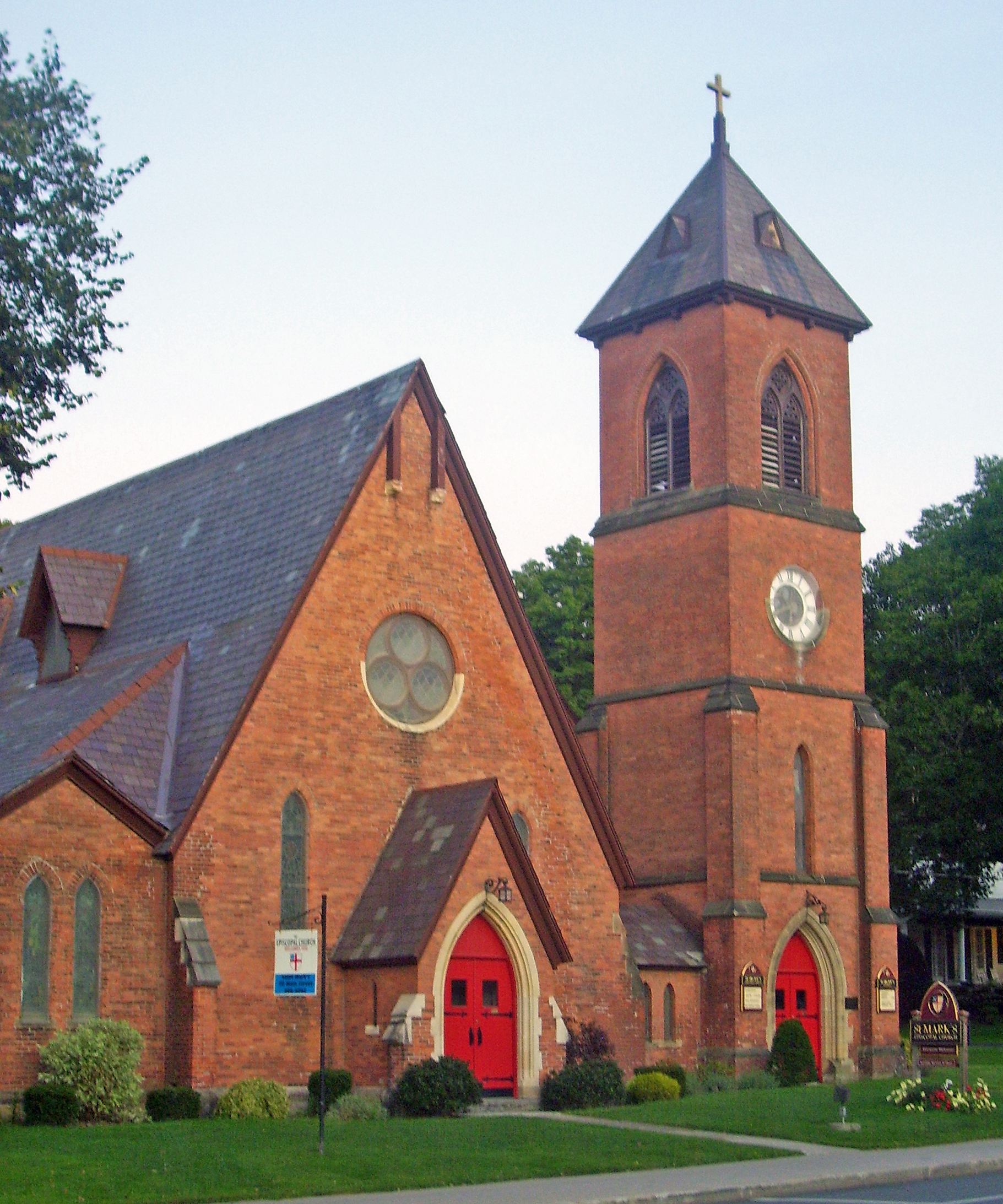
- West elevation and tower, 2008

Religion
- Affiliation: Episcopal Church in the United States of America
- Leadership: Interim
- Year consecrated: 1860

Location
- Location: Hoosick Falls, NY
- Interactive map of St. Mark's Episcopal Church
- Coordinates: 42°53′59″N 73°21′0″W

Architecture
- Architect: Henry Dudley
- Style: Gothic Revival
- Groundbreaking: 1858
- Completed: 1860

Specifications
- Direction of façade: west
- Capacity: 250
- Materials: brick, stone, stucco, slate

U.S. National Register of Historic Places
- Added to NRHP: July 27, 2000
- NRHP Reference no.: 00000836

St. Mark's Episcopal Church is located on Main Street in Hoosick Falls, New York, United States. It is a mid-19th century brick building. The congregation itself was founded in the 1830s.

Architect Henry Dudley designed it according to the Ecclesiological principles of Episcopal church design, after English country parish churches, which they held to be the ideal for churches of that denomination. Uncharacteristically, he used brick rather than stone. He was probably commissioned by local industrial magnate Walter A. Wood, a member of the church.

Several additions and renovations were made to the original building in the decades after its construction, most notably a parish hall in the early 20th century. In 2000 it was listed on the National Register of Historic Places.

== Building ==
The church is on a small lot on the west side of Main Street, just south of a village park and a short distance from the post office opposite. It is two blocks south of downtown. It is on a small flat lot, set back slightly with a hedge and lawn in front and mature trees around it. A driveway on the south leads to a small parking lot in the rear. Behind it is the only section of a cast iron fence that once surrounded the entire property.

There are three sections to the building itself: the nave, a freestanding bell tower with hyphen connecting it to the nave, and a parish house attached on the south. The first two are brick while the third is stucco over wood frame.

The nave has a steeply pitched gable roof shingled in slate. It has corner buttresses. Its west (front) facade has a small enclosed porch with a similar roof and buttresses. Two lancet windows are on either side; a rose window is above. A shallow molded cornice is at the roofline; two ornamental brackets are at the peak. The main entrance has double wood doors with wrought iron decorative hinges and a pointed arch limestone surround.

On the sides sympathetic later enlargements have covered the original walls. Two lancet windows remain on the south, and there are roof dormers on either side. The north side's addition, which allowed for a side aisle in the sanctuary, has paired lancets and a shed roof. A transept with lancets and a steep roof similar to the church's main block is at the rear. The one-and-a-half-story parish hall projects from the south. It also has a steep gabled roof, and is decorated with hood moldings on the windows.

Narrow lancets also light the single-story connector to the bell tower. It has four stages, all delineated by sandstone trim. Corner buttresses rise two stories. The first has an entrance similar to the front. The second has another lancet on the east and west, the third a clock and the fourth a pointed arch louvered opening with Meneely chimes. The hipped roof is pierced by triangular vents and topped by a cross.

Inside, the sanctuary has a hammerbeam roof with trusses of dark stained wood. Plaster walls, original pews, a lectern with brass eagle and stained glass from different periods complete the trim. In the chancel are a marble altar originally from another church and an elaborate oak reredos.

== History ==
The St. Mark's parish was founded in 1833. It held services first in the local schoolhouse, then in a meetinghouse where the village's Baptist Church is now. Two decades after its founding, it had a congregation big enough to build its own church.

Walter A. Wood, later to become the village's major industrialist through the manufacture of mechanical mowers and reapers, played a major part in building the church. He visited Troy, the county seat, frequently and was familiar with Henry Dudley's work there, such as St. John's Episcopal Church (now a contributing property to the Central Troy Historic District) and some of the buildings at Oakwood Cemetery. Dudley also designed and built Wood's Tudor Revival house (no longer extant) on the hillside behind the church.

Dudley, an English immigrant, was a member of the New York Ecclesiological Society. Its members advocated that Episcopal churches be modeled on English country parish churches, particularly in small country towns, where they felt that form was more harmonious with the surrounding rural landscape than the white frame Greek Revival churches that had dominated American church architecture at the time. They also called for simplicity, since it was not necessary for a church to be elaborately decorated to fulfill its purpose. Most churches designed by Ecclesiologists thus featured steeply pitched roofs, axial plans, and clearly defined separations between the various functional spaces.

The only unusual aspect of St. Mark's among Dudley's work is its use of brick rather than stone. It is not known why, although perhaps that material was available in enough quantity in Hoosick Falls at the time to make it economical to build the church of it.

Construction began on the main block in 1858; it was completed and consecrated two years later. Dudley designed the later additions, the north aisle and transept, in 1865. In the next two decades, the chimes would be added to the tower and the altar windows installed. The church underwent a major refurbishing in 1880 without any effect on the design. Ten years later the chancel was enlarged.

The last significant addition was the construction of the parish hall, in 1912–13, almost 20 years after Dudley's death. Its original large single hall on the first floor was divided into classrooms in the mid-20th century. Since then the church has remained unchanged.

== See also ==
- National Register of Historic Places listings in Rensselaer County, New York
