= Walloomsac =

Walloomsac may refer to:

- Walloomsac, New York, a location in New York State
- Walloomsac River, a tributary of the Hoosic River
