= Stuyvesant Plaza =

Shopping center in Guilderland, New York

Coordinates: 42°41′6″N 73°50′26.55″W

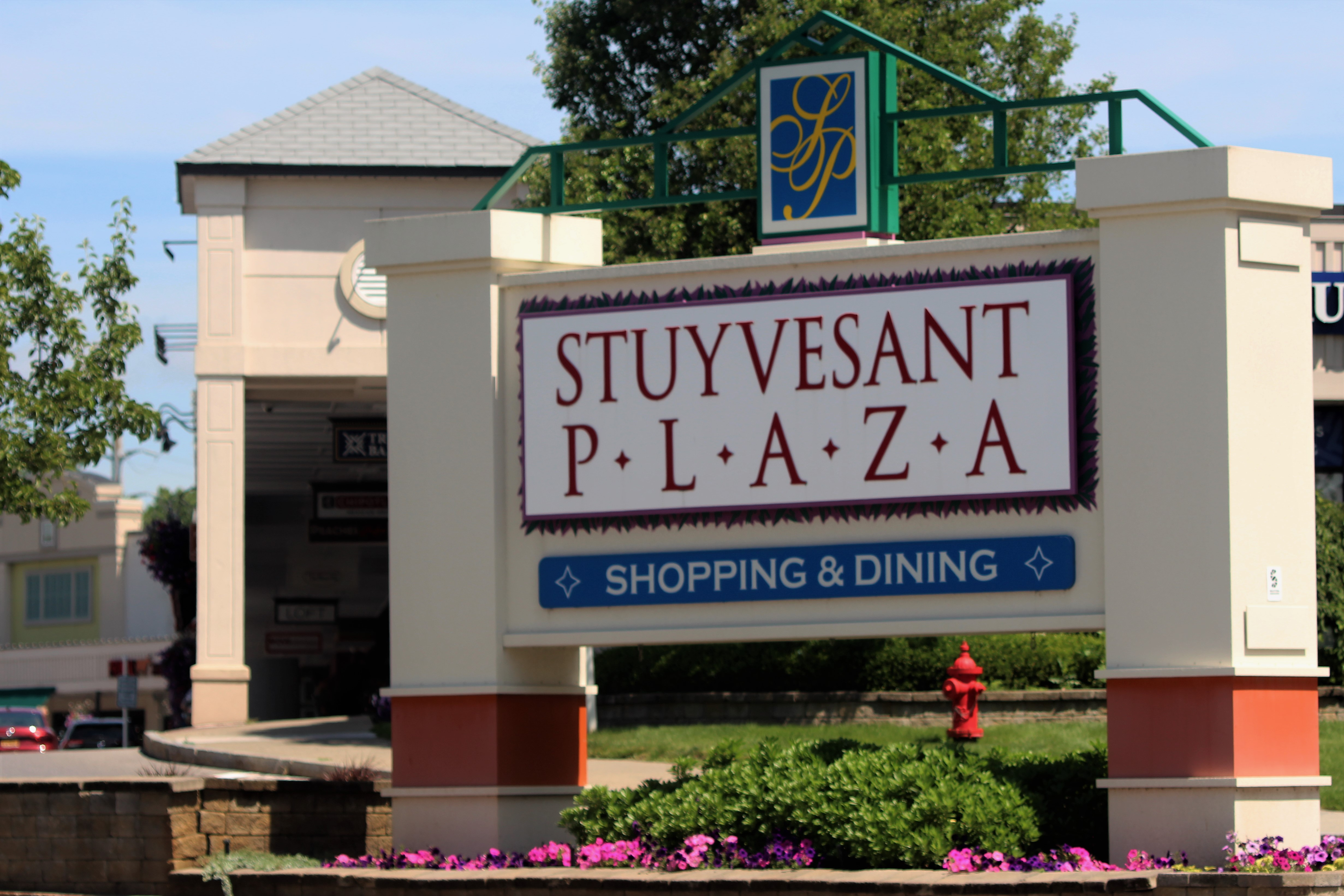
- Location: Guilderland, New York
- Opened: 1959
- Developer: Lewis A. Swyer
- Owner: Stuyvesant Plaza Inc. and WS Development
- Num. of stores: 65
- Num. of anchor tenants: 0
- Floor area: 240,000 sq ft (22,000 m^{2})
- Floors: 1

Stuyvesant Plaza is an upscale shopping plaza and office complex located in the Albany suburb of Guilderland, on Western Avenue (US 20), near the south end of the Adirondack Northway. The complex includes a number of high and low rise office buildings near the shopping center. The shopping plaza opened in 1959, making it the third oldest in the Capital Region, after Latham Corners Shopping Center in 1957. Stuyvesant Plaza offers a mix of locally-owned and national retailers.

== History ==
The plaza was built by Lewis A. Swyer and opened on November 4, 1959. The original 18 tenants included a clothing store, two supermarkets, a pharmacy, an auto-parts store, and a Howard Johnson's restaurant in a 170,000 square feet (16,000 m^{2}), L-shaped complex. In the 1960s, Stuyvesant Plaza had expanded to 35 stores and formed its current U-shape, fueled by the rise in businesses attributed to white flight. This allowed Stuyvesant Plaza to serve the booming suburbs of Colonie, Bethlehem, and Guilderland. The popularity of the shopping plaza spurred the construction of Colonie Center in 1966 and Crossgates Mall in 1984, which offered primarily national brands and anchor stores.

By 1981, Stuyvesant Plaza as a shopping center was performing poorly with no serious distinction. Consultants suggested the complex focus on discount retailers. However, the complex ended up focusing on small, non-chain retailers. Renovations completed by the mid 1980s made the strip mall one of the top performers along the East Coast. By early 1987, there were 62 specialty retail stores at the plaza.

The fourth Chipotle Mexican Grill in the Capital Region opened in Stuyvesant Plaza in 2010. In 2022, WS Development, a Massachusetts-based real estate developer acquired majority ownership of Stuyvesant Plaza. In the years following the acquisition, several tenants left, including TGI Friday's. Soon after, Anthopologie, Warby Parker, Athleta, and Vineyard Vines opened locations within the plaza. Stuyvesant Plaza added eight new retailers in 2025, with half of the brands debuting in the Capital Region. In 2026, Madewell, Tempur-Pedic, Kendra Scott, and Shake Shack opened locations at Stuyvesant Plaza, with Abercrombie & Fitch and abercrombie kids opening in 2027.

== Ownership ==
Ed Swyer serves as President of Stuyvesant Plaza Inc. and has continued ownership of the Executive Park portion of the plaza. WS Development has assumed oversight of the plaza's operations and management, with Rachel Ferluge named as its General Manager.

== Size ==
As of 1987, the plaza consisted of 240,000 square feet (22,000 m^{2}).
