= Hoosick Falls Armory =

- U.S. National Register of Historic Places
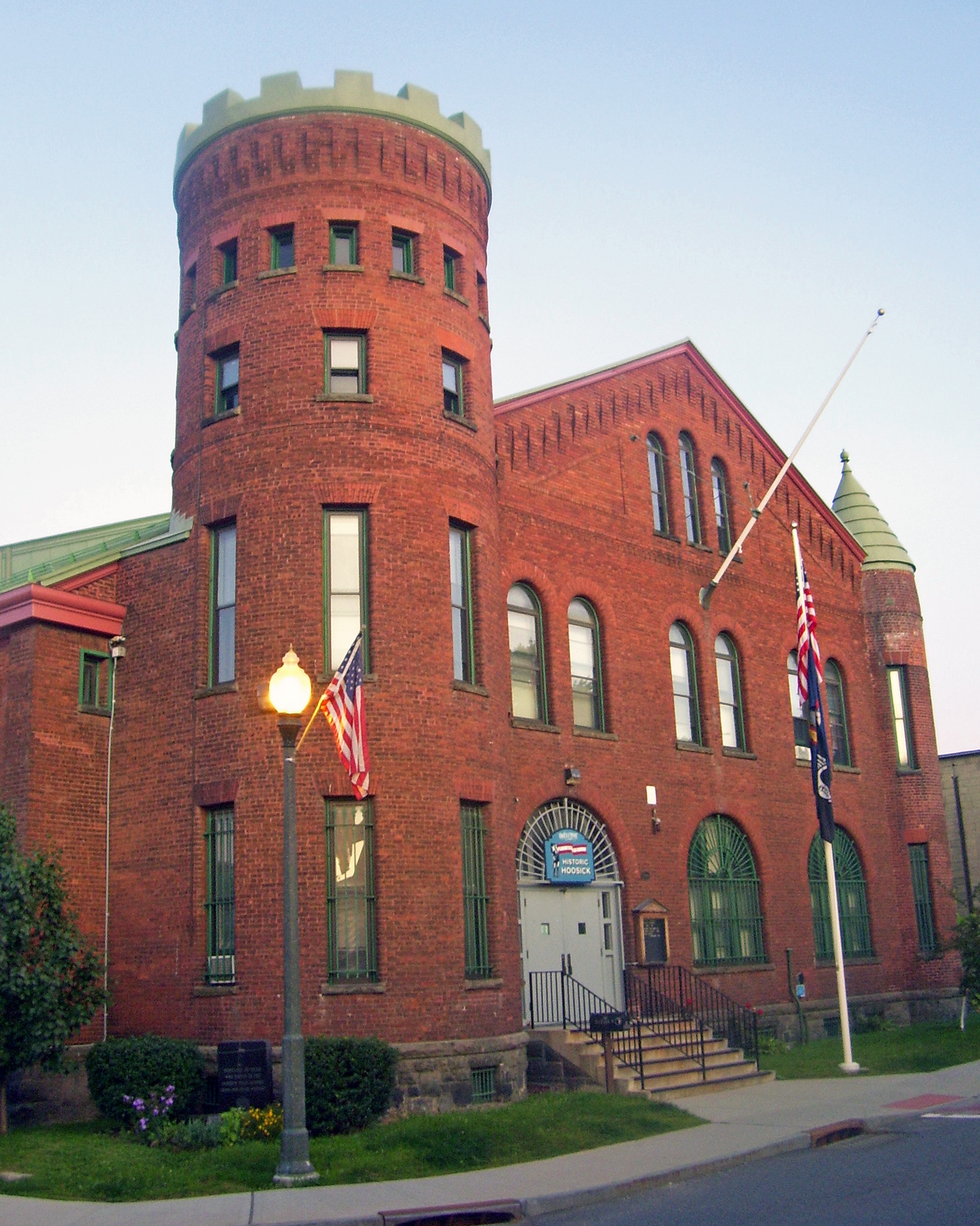
- West elevation, 2008
- Location: Hoosick Falls, New York
- Coordinates: 42°53′58″N 73°21′5″W
- Area: 0.3 acres (0.12 ha)
- Built: 1889
- Architect: Isaac G. Perry
- Architectural style: Richardson Romanesque
- MPS: Army National Guard Armories in New York State MPS
- NRHP reference No.: 95000086
- Added to NRHP: March 2, 1995

The Hoosick Falls Armory is located along Church Street (NY 22) in Hoosick Falls, New York, United States. It is a red brick building with castellated tower dating to the late 19th century.

One of many armories in New York designed by state architect Isaac G. Perry, it is one of his earlier armories, more restrained and less imposing than those he built later in his career. It has remained mostly intact since its construction. The military units of the New York National Guard based there, first mustered during the American Civil War, have fought in the 1916 Mexican Border Campaign, in Belgium during World War I, and the Battle of Saipan during World War II. It is closed as a military facility and currently houses the Hoosick Armory Youth Center and Community Coalition, abbreviated as HAYC3, which runs community events and provides studio and office space to small area businesses.

In 1995 the armory was listed on the National Register of Historic Places. With the 2009 auction of the 18th Separate Company Armory in Glens Falls, and the purchase and conversion of the Hoosick Falls Armory into a community center, the Gloversville armory is the only one still in military use in the Capital District.

== Building ==
The armory is located on a flat lot roughly a quarter-acre (1,000 m^{2}) at the northeast corner of the Church and Elm Street intersection, southwest of downtown. The neighborhood around the armory has a mix of commercial and residential properties. There are houses on the other side of Church; to the south is a car dealership and Immaculate Conception Church is behind the armory. A chain-link fence is on the south, a parking lot in the rear and the front has a small lawn.

The building itself is a large rectangular gable-roofed brick building. The load-bearing walls rest on a rusticated limestone foundation. The two-and-a-half-story west (front) section serves as administrative offices; the two-story, eight-bay rear is the drill shed. All sections of the building have seamed metal roofs.

On the front, two towers flank the three-bay facade. The main entrance, located on the northernmost bay of the first story, has a large steel double door with half sidelights topped by a round fanlight with protective iron grille. The other two bays have tripartite round-arched windows. On the second story the windows are similar but paired, and a single group of three windows is in the apex of the gable. At the roofline the cornice is machicolated between a corbeled string course.

The two-story southwest tower has narrow windows with stone sills, flared brick lintels and a conical roof. The taller northwest tower has similar windows that get much shorter on the third and attic stories, topped by a crenelated parapet and machicolated cornice.

On the north and south facades of the drill shed, brick pilasters separate the windows, given a similar treatment to those on the first story. Two bays have double-doored entrances. The rear facade is blank. Three shed dormer windows pierce the roof on either side.

Within the armory some original features remain. In the front hall, these include the oak staircase, lockers and some door trim. The second-floor offices are intact but modern paneling has been installed over the original plaster. The attic has been heavily altered. Some original pressed-metal ceilings remain in the basement, but otherwise it has been completely redone. In the drill shed, the original hardwood floors, brick walls, exposed steel trusses and wainscoted ceiling remain.

== History ==
A volunteer militia unit had been based in Hoosick Falls since 1835. It fought in the Civil War at both First and Second Bull Run, the Peninsula Campaign, Manassas Gap, Fredericksburg and Chancellorsville. In 1885 it was organized as the 32nd Separate Company.

It moved into the armory, one of 20 in New York known to have been designed by state architect Isaac G. Perry, in 1889. It was one of Perry's earlier works. Like his later armories it shows the influence of medieval military architecture and the contemporary Richardson Romanesque style, but unlike the later ones it is more restrained and less imposing on its surroundings.

In 1892 the unit was called to active duty during the Switchman's Strike in Buffalo. Six years later, the members volunteered to serve in the Spanish–American War and became Company M of the 2nd New York Infantry. They wound up being garrisoned in Florida for the duration of hostilities as transportation to Cuba was not available; while there many became sick with tropical diseases and two succumbed to typhoid fever.

The unit next saw action when they were among the 100,000 National Guardsmen federalized in 1916 by President Woodrow Wilson in response to Pancho Villa's cross-border raids into New Mexico and Arizona. This heightened state of readiness helped them mobilize for World War I the following year. They were combined with a unit from Troy and attached to the 27th Division as Company M of the 105th Infantry. The unit served in Belgium with British troops attacking the Hindenburg Line and sustained heavy casualties. One of them was First Lieutenant William B. Turner, who was posthumously awarded the Medal of Honor for his actions in singlehandedly taking out enemy machine gun placements. The bodies of the dead lay in state in the armory upon their return to Hoosick Falls.

In October 1940, the unit, now Company A of the 105th, was mobilized again in anticipation of possible war. Its soldiers did not see combat until 1943, when they accompanied the 165th Infantry at Makin Atoll in the Gilbert Islands. Later they fought alongside the Marines at Saipan and Okinawa. In December 1945, a few months after the war ended, they were restored to state control.

The 27th became an armored unit, and the 105th accordingly became the 205th Armored, with the Hoosick Falls unit as Company C. In 1970 the 205th was absorbed into the new 210th Armored. Dwindling membership in the unit and low community use of the building led to the closure of the armory for one year in 1980. It reopened due to the need for community space. In 1993 the 210th was reorganized as the 101st Cavalry (Armor). 101st Cavalry was deactivated in 2006 shortly after the unit returned from deployment to Iraq.

== See also ==
- National Register of Historic Places listings in Rensselaer County, New York
