= Estabrook Octagon House =

Historic house in New York, United States

- U.S. National Register of Historic Places
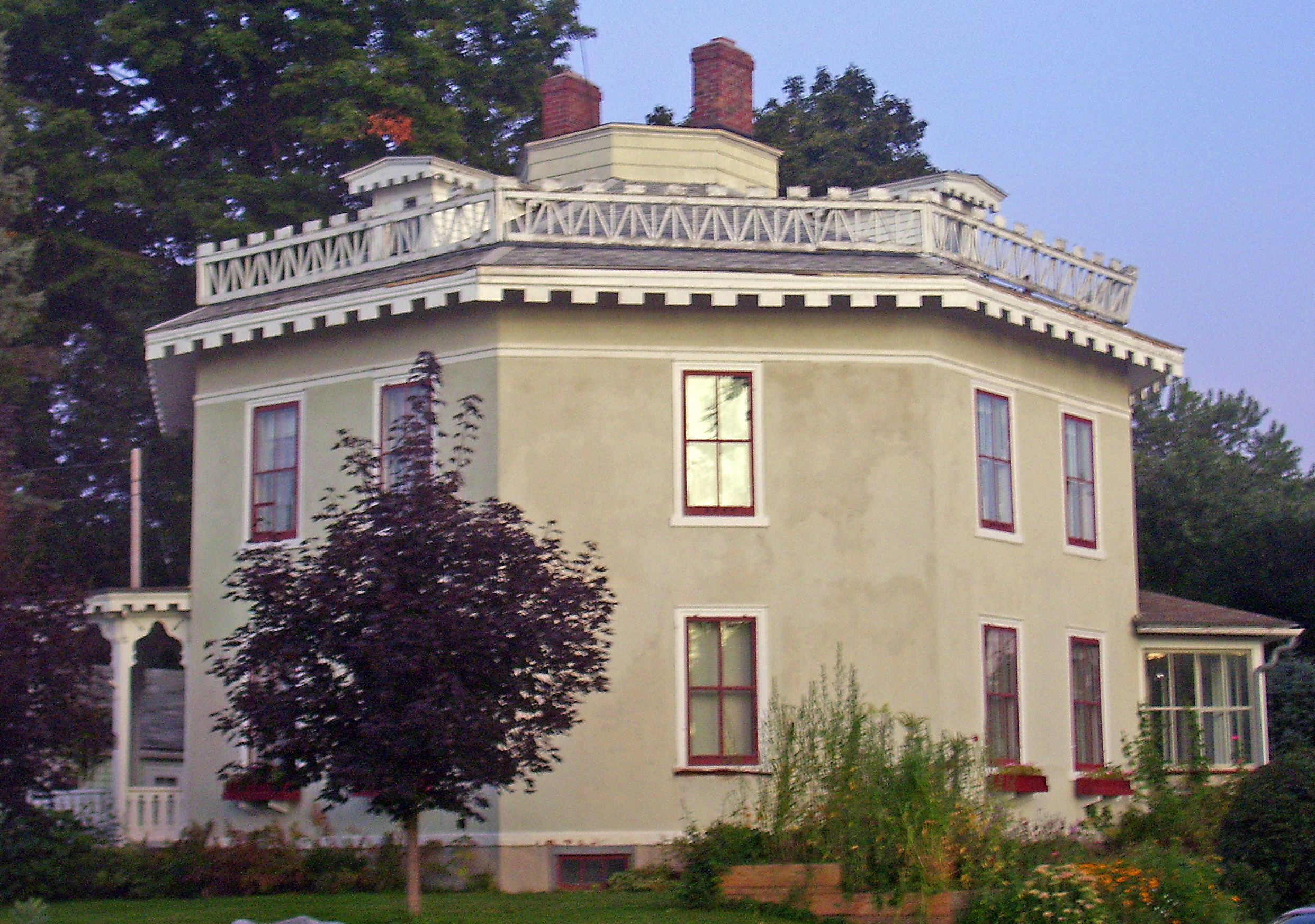
- Northwest corner, 2008

- Location within New York Location within the United States
- Interactive map showing the location of Estabrook Octagon House
- Location: 8 River St., Hoosick Falls, New York
- Nearest city: Bennington, VT
- Coordinates: 42°53′47″N 73°21′11″W
- Area: 2 acres (8,000 m²)
- Built: 1853–54
- Architect: Estabrook, Ezra
- Architectural style: Octagon Mode
- NRHP reference No.: 80002755
- Added to NRHP: February 8, 1980

The Estabrook Octagon House, built in 1853 by Ezra Robinson Estabrook, is a historic octagonal house located at 8 River Street (NY 22) in Hoosick Falls, New York. It was constructed in strict accordance with the theories of Orson Squire Fowler, author of A Home for All.

It is preserved intact, and is one of the few remaining octagon houses that was built exactly as Fowler advocated. On February 8, 1980, it was added to the National Register of Historic Places.

The house has been altered slightly, however. It was a pleasing feature of the house that the balustrade design, which appears on the roof of the house, had been repeated in different scales also on the roof of the porch and on the cupola.

== Building ==
The house is on a two-acre (8,000 m^{2}) lot at the corner of River Street and the tracks laid down by the Boston and Maine Railroad. The neighborhood is residential, with most other houses dating to the 19th century as well.

It is two stories high, faced in stucco over walls built of a mixture of grout and Rosendale cement. A small square porch projects from the east side. The facets have an alternating fenestration of one and two windows. The roofline is decorated with a dentiled bargeboard. Above it is an intricate wood crest, and behind it several small dormer windows with trim similar to the roofline. Two chimneys rise from the similarly trimmed cupola in the center of the hipped roof.

The interior plan has four large rooms on each level with the staircase around the central post. The smaller rooms serve support functions, such as bathrooms and closets.

== History ==
Ezra Estabrook was inspired to build the house by Orson Squire Fowler's A Home for All, or a Cheap, Convenient and Superior Mode of Building, which came out in a revised edition in 1853. Fowler, a phrenologist who dabbled in architecture, was intrigued by polygonal forms found in nature and adapted for use by man. In his book he advocated the octagonal form since it could be built by the homeowner at a low cost.

Estabrook followed Fowler's advice and did most of the building work himself. He followed Fowler's plan exactly, including the cupola and alternating one-two fenestration. His only change was the material. Fowler had called for the wall to be made of a mixture of water, lime and an aggregate, since they were widely available around the country. The Estabrooks chose the Rosendale cement-grout mixture along with coarse local gravel since it was locally available and had proven more durable. Ezra Estabrook kept a diary during construction, in which he records pouring as much as one foot (25 cm) a day of the mixture between wooden forms.

His descendants lived in the house for almost a century, until 1943. There have been very few alterations to the interior. It is one of the few surviving octagon houses built as Fowler had originally intended.

Today the home has been converted from residential to the home of Marker's Octagon Realty, which caterers to the Hoosick Falls area.

== See also ==
- List of octagon houses
- National Register of Historic Places listings in Rensselaer County, New York
