= Hoosick Falls, New York =

Hoosick Falls
- Village
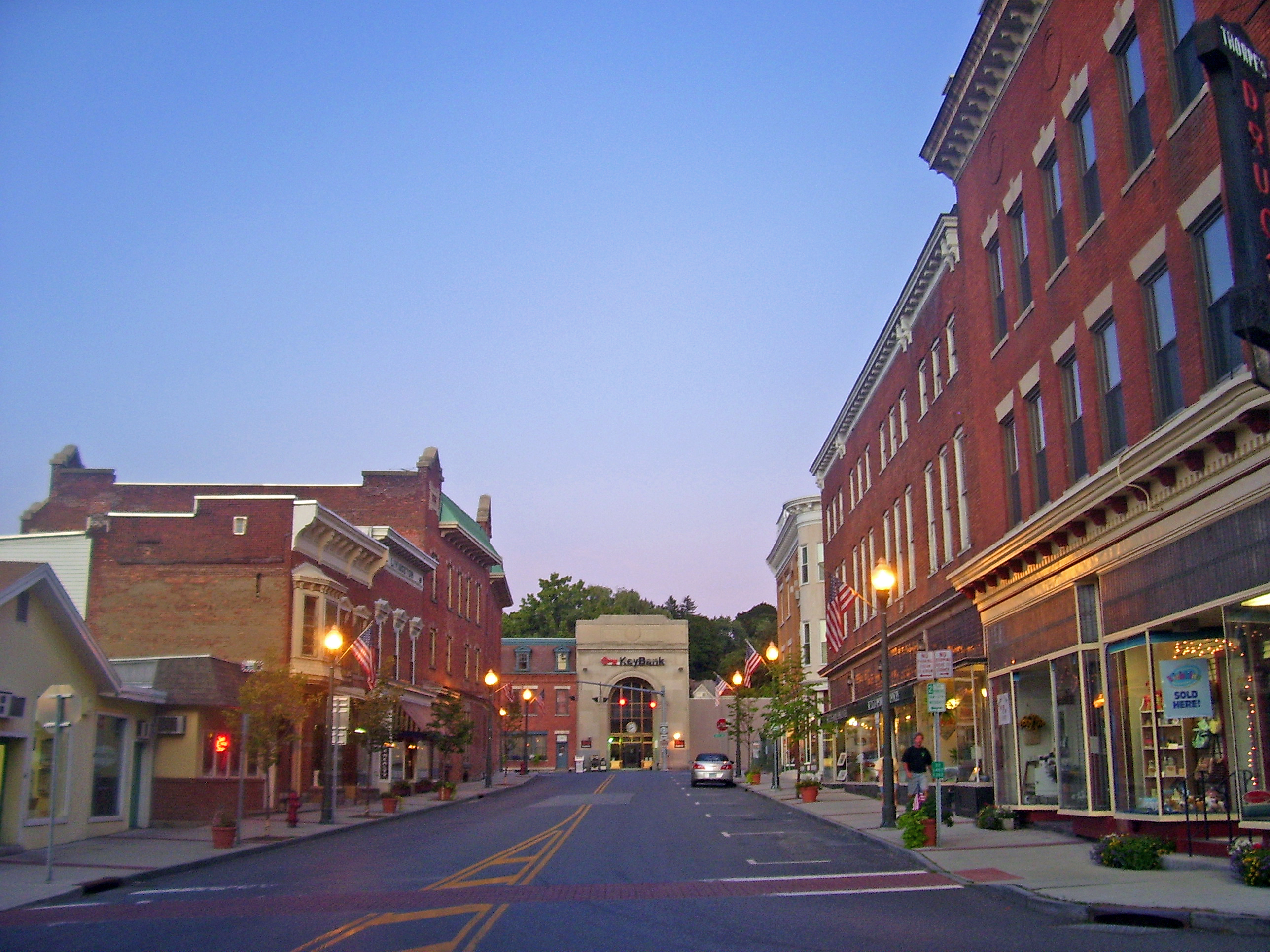
- Downtown Hoosick Falls
- Etymology: Falls on adjacent river
- Location in Rensselaer County and the state of New York.

- Location within New York Location within the United States
- Coordinates: 42°54′2″N 73°21′9″W
- Country: United States
- State: New York
- County: Rensselaer
- Founded: 1827

Government
  - Mayor: Dan Schuttig

Area
  - Total: 1.60 sq mi (4.14 km^{2})
  - Land: 1.60 sq mi (4.14 km^{2})
  - Water: 0 sq mi (0.00 km^{2})
- Elevation: 443 ft (135 m)
- Highest elevation (SE corner of village): 760 ft (230 m)
- Lowest elevation (Hoosick River at N boundary): 380 ft (120 m)

Population (2020)
  - Total: 3,216
  - Density: 2,012.5/sq mi (777.04/km^{2})
- Time zone: UTC-5 (Eastern (EST))
  - Summer (DST): UTC-4 (EDT)
- ZIP Code: 12090
- Area code: 518
- FIPS code: 36-35474
- GNIS feature ID: 0953177
- Website: www.villageofhoosickfalls.com

Hoosick Falls is a village in Rensselaer County, New York, United States. As of the 2020 census, Hoosick Falls had a population of 3,216. During its peak, in 1900, the village had a population of approximately 7,000.

The village of Hoosick Falls is near the center of the town of Hoosick on NY 22. The village center, listed on the National Register of Historic Places as Hoosick Falls Historic District, has a thriving early-20th century downtown commercial district, and many of the buildings have been restored. Recent commercial additions include a bakery/sandwich shop, a French restaurant, a coffee roastery, an art gallery and bistro, and a barbecue joint with a live music venue.

Painter Grandma Moses is buried in the village. The site of the British entrenchments at the Battle of Bennington, August 6, 1777, is nearby and is maintained as Bennington Battlefield State Historic Site.

== History ==
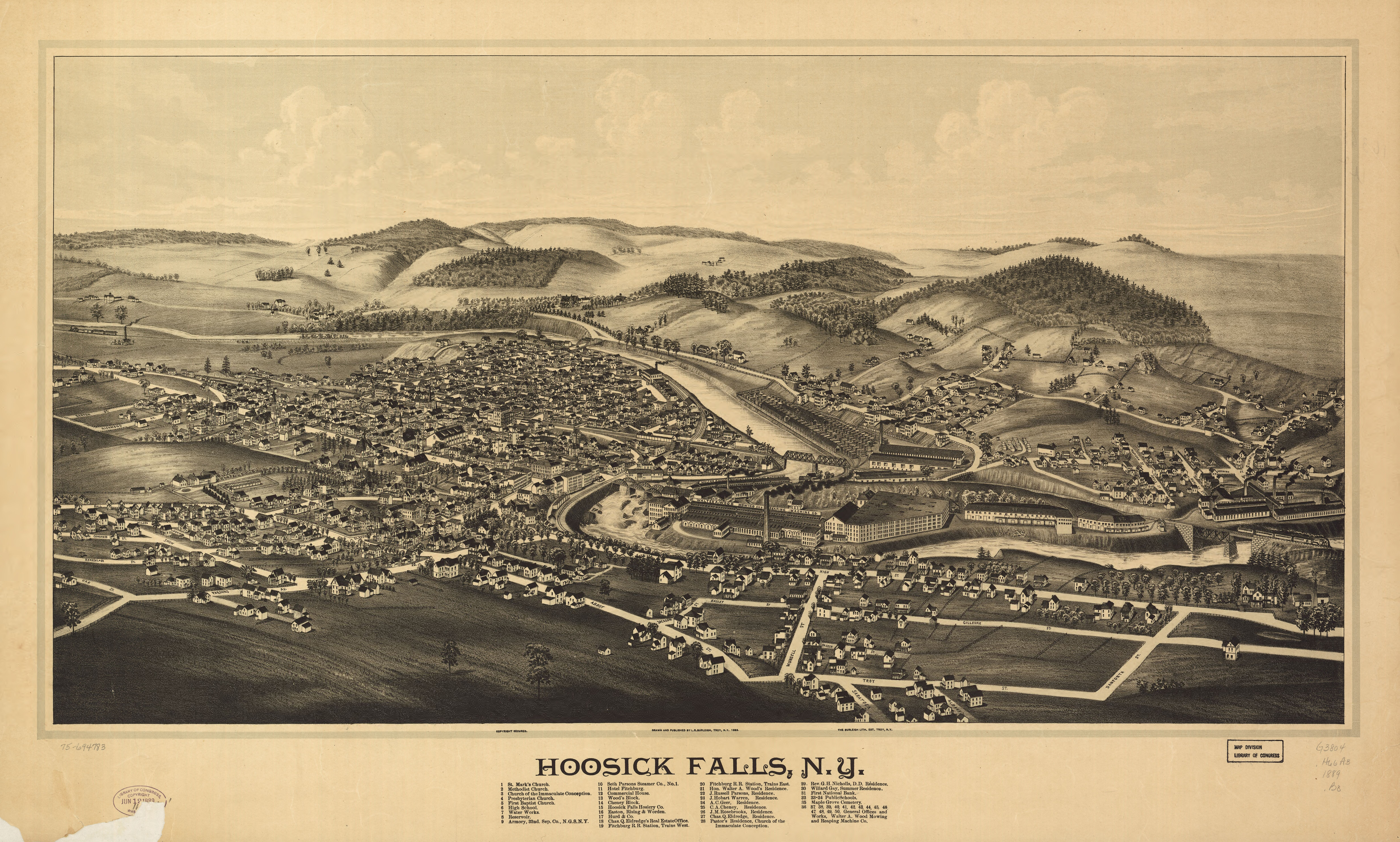
Perspective map of Hoosick Falls from 1889 by L.R. Burleigh with a list of landmarks

Although this has been an issue of considerable debate, it's believed the first documented settlers came to Hoosick Falls, on the Hoosic River, around 1746. The French drove the settlers out in 1754 and most of the settlement was burned, but they returned and rebuilt after the French & Indian War ended. Hoosick Falls was incorporated as a village in 1827.

=== Walter A. Wood Mowing and Reaping Machine Co. ===
In 1852, a blacksmith named Walter A. Wood began manufacturing a reaper in Hoosick Falls. By the 1890s, the Walter A. Wood Mowing & Reaping Company was the largest farm machinery manufacturer in the world, taking up 85 acres (340,000 m2) on the west bank of the river. The Wood Company closed in 1924, mainly due to the introduction of John Deere's revolutionary self propelled farm equipment. Most of these facilities were used by the Colasta Corporation, a radio parts manufacturer, from the mid-1920s until the late 1950s. Later, parts of this site were used as a lumber yard/hardware store. A rash of arson fires in the mid and late 1970s consumed the entire complex. The only buildings still in use today are outside of the main complex, the Interface Solutions Plant (formerly the Wood-Flong Paper Mill), which was Walter A Wood's steel foundry. The original Office Building is still present also.

Along with the Walter Wood plant, Hoosick Falls was a boomtown in the 19th century. Many other businesses came to town, creating growth and prosperity. Hoosick Falls once had factories that made paper, small numbers of appliances, glass, and some nominal soda and beer bottling plants. A large number of rich Victorian homes were built during this period and are still there today, most in good shape. Hoosick Falls also served as a regional center of trade and export. Local farmers and manufacturers would come to town to sell their goods and load them on rail cars bound for New York City or abroad. These goods consisted of manufacturers, grain, milk, livestock, construction materials (mostly slate and brick), paper & pulp, timber and beverages.

=== Historic Sites ===
The Estabrook Octagon House, Hoosick Falls Armory, Hoosick Falls Historic District, St. Mark's Episcopal Church, and United States Post Office are listed on the National Register of Historic Places.

== The arts ==
Hoosick Falls and the region has long been a landing place for artists of various interests. Grandma Moses, the American folk artist who rose to fame after her work was discovered in Thorpe's Pharmacy in downtown Hoosick Falls by a passing New York City art dealer, was born close by and is buried in the Maple Grove Cemetery. Jose De Creeft, the Spanish-born artist and sculptor best known for his sculpture of Alice in Wonderland in New York's Central Park kept a home in the village and is buried there. Jenny Holzer, the American conceptual artist, has lived just outside of the Village for years. Yucel Erdogan, the NYC artist and photographer, operates the 3rd Eye Gallery in a renovated department store in the downtown commercial district.

=== Murals ===
Hoosick Falls is noted for its murals and outdoors art displays. The downtown hosts two significant murals, one by local artist Roger Weeden, that depicts the Grandma Moses painting, "Wagon Repair Shop". The second is by regional artist Katie May Erskine, depicting an owl, reflecting the indigenous people's name for the location of the village: The Valley of the Owl.

== Industry and manufacturing ==
=== Plastics Industry ===
A local company, Dodge Fibers Corporation, started producing Teflon-based products in 1955. This business was quite successful and later sold to larger companies. However, the industry generated chemical pollution, especially PFOA. Concern developed locally in 2014, and in December 2015, the Village advised residents to use bottled water provided for free by Saint-Gobain, the current owner of the plastics facilities. In 2017, the Village constructed a reverse-osmosis carbon filtration water treatment system, and has since provided PFOA-free water to all residents, The NYSDEC unveiled a proposal on December 3, 2021, to construct two new water wells for the town at an estimated cost of $9.7 million. These wells will be located to the south of the town and connected to the existing water treatment plant.

== PFOA crisis ==
The contamination of Hoosick Falls’ water was originally discovered by resident Michael Hickey following the death of his father from an aggressive kidney cancer, which was diagnosed after his retirement from the Saint-Gobain Performance Plastics plant. Hickey noted the elevated rate of cancer diagnoses and deaths in their village, and began looking into the effects of the chemicals used in local manufacturing plants.

Over the years, several manufacturing plants in the area released waste containing perfluorooctanoic acid (PFOA) into the surrounding environment. PFOA, which belongs to a group of chemicals called per- and polyfluoroalkyl substances (PFAS) used to make household and commercial products, has been shown to cause reproductive, developmental, liver, kidney, and immunological effects in laboratory animals. Much of the focus of investigation and litigation has been on the Saint-Gobain Performance Plastics facility, which is located next to the village water treatment plant and began manufacturing with PFOA in 1999.

Hickey tested water samples from his kitchen sink and businesses in the village, and discovered a PFOA level of 540 parts per trillion, exceeding the existing EPA guideline at the time of 400 ppt by 35%. In 2016, the EPA guideline was updated to 70 ppt following updated studies of the effects on animals and exposed human populations, the amounts in Hoosick exceeded this by 671%. As of June 2022, the EPA lowered the advised levels for PFOA to .004 ppt. The levels of PFOA present in Hoosick Falls’ water in 2014 exceeded this level by almost 135,000%.

The Village Board, which had allegedly denied requests from Hickey to test the water, did not issue a warning to the citizens of Hoosick Falls about the water until 16 months after Hickey's findings. The EPA issued an advisory against drinking or cooking with the public water supply in November 2015. In December 2015, the Village advised residents to use bottled water provided for free by Saint-Gobain, the current owner of the plastics facilities and the party responsible for the pollution mitigation.

In February 2016 New York State added the Saint-Gobain facility to their Registry of Hazardous Waste Disposal Sites as a Class 2 site. In July 2017, the EPA added the site to the Superfund National Priorities List (NPL), which lists priority sites in the United States in need of long-term cleanup efforts.

The New York State Department of Environmental Conservation (NYSDEC) is leading the investigation and cleanup of the McCaffrey Street site, with support from the EPA. In June 2016 Saint-Gobain Performance Plastics and Honeywell International were deemed “potentially responsible parties” for the contamination, and entered into a consent order with the NYSDEC. As an interim remedial measure to address the contamination, the two companies installed a granulated activated carbon (GAC) filtration system on the public water supply wells to treat the water in 2016. In 2019, they built a groundwater interceptor trench at the McCaffrey Street site to prevent contaminated groundwater from reaching public water wells.

In order to address the contamination to over 800 private wells, the state installed point-of-entry treatment systems (POET), which treat the water entering the building, reducing contaminants for safe drinking.

While the interim remedial measures addressed the immediate concerns of contaminated water, the corporations were also required to perform a remedial investigation and feasibility study (RI/FS) at the site in order to determine the nature and extent of the contamination and identify and evaluate cleanup alternatives. The NYSDEC reviewed a study submitted by the companies, which proposed five potential long-term water supplies, and opened up the proposal to public comment in the fall of 2019 through email, letters, and two public meetings. On December 3, 2021, the NYSDEC published their decision regarding the long-term water replacement, with two new groundwater supply wells to be developed and existing test wells south of Hoosick Falls to be converted to production wells at an estimated cost of $9.7 million.

In addition to the consent order, a class-action lawsuit was filed against Saint-Gobain and Honeywell, with 3M and DuPont Co. later being accused as well. In July 2021 a preliminary settlement of $65.25 million was reached with Saint-Gobain, which provides current and former residents with compensation for potential health impacts due to exposure, compensation for the loss of property value following the addition of the area to the Superfund National Priorities List, compensation to those who had a private well contaminated ($7.7 million, 12% of total), case expenses and attorney fees ($13.4 million, 20% of total), compensation for the ten main plaintiffs that contributed significantly to the case ($250,000, .4% of total), and establishes a 10-year medical monitoring program ($23 million, 35% of total).

Throughout the court proceedings attorneys for Saint-Gobain and Honeywell moved for the case to be dismissed, claiming that “mere accumulation of elevated levels of PFOA in the blood did not constitute physical injury” and that “in the absence of physical damage, 532 Madison, 96 N.Y.2d 280, 727 9 N.Y.S.2d 49, precludes recovery in tort for harm that is exclusively economic, and that because ‘groundwater is not private property,’ plaintiffs could not base property damage claims on ‘alleged injury to groundwater’. Defendants also urged dismissal of all property claims of plaintiffs who rented their homes, on the theory that they lacked ownership interest, and dismissal of all claims of nuisance, on the theory that private nuisance is by definition a tort that threatens one or a few persons, not one that impacts the whole community”. These motions were denied by U.S. District Senior Judge Lawrence E. Kahn, when the defendants appealed, the denials were upheld by the U.S. Second Circuit Court of Appeals.

Following the settlement, Lia T. LoBello, as spokesperson for the company, submitted the following statement:

"Saint-Gobain is pleased to have reached a settlement agreement with the plaintiffs in the New York class action lawsuit. Since first learning about the issue of PFAS in Hoosick Falls, the company took a leadership position on this issue and we believe this agreement is indicative of that commitment. The health, safety and wellbeing of both our employees and the communities in which we operate are important to us, and we take that responsibility very seriously."

== Geography ==
According to the United States Census Bureau, the village has a total area of 1.7 square miles (4.4 km^{2}), all land.

The village is divided by the Hoosic River.

Hoosick Falls is bisected by NY Route 22. Public transportation to and from the village is provided between Albany and Bennington, Vermont by Yankee Trails World Travel's weekday-running Albany-Bennington Shuttle bus.

== Demographics ==
Historical population
| Census | Pop. | Note | %± |
|---|---|---|---|
| 1880 | 4,530 | | — |
| 1890 | 7,014 | | 54.8% |
| 1900 | 5,671 | | −19.1% |
| 1910 | 5,532 | | −2.5% |
| 1920 | 4,896 | | −11.5% |
| 1930 | 4,755 | | −2.9% |
| 1940 | 4,279 | | −10.0% |
| 1950 | 4,297 | | 0.4% |
| 1960 | 4,023 | | −6.4% |
| 1970 | 3,897 | | −3.1% |
| 1980 | 3,609 | | −7.4% |
| 1990 | 3,490 | | −3.3% |
| 2000 | 3,436 | | −1.5% |
| 2010 | 3,501 | | 1.9% |
| 2020 | 3,216 | | −8.1% |
3399 U.S. Decennial Census

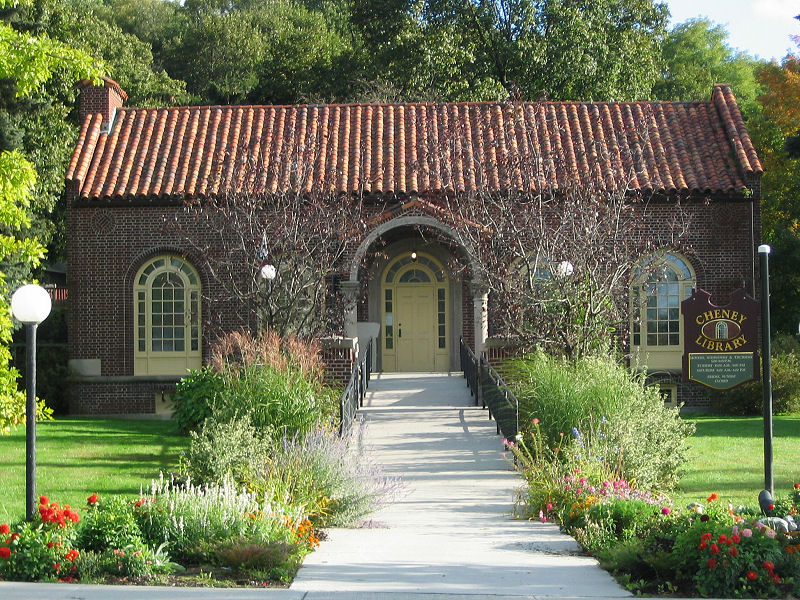
The Cheney Library, located on Classic Street in Hoosick Falls

=== 2020 census ===
As of the 2020 census, Hoosick Falls had a population of 3,216. The median age was 42.6 years. 20.6% of residents were under the age of 18 and 20.0% of residents were 65 years of age or older. For every 100 females there were 89.0 males, and for every 100 females age 18 and over there were 87.2 males age 18 and over.

0.0% of residents lived in urban areas, while 100.0% lived in rural areas.

There were 1,377 households in Hoosick Falls, of which 25.9% had children under the age of 18 living in them. Of all households, 36.9% were married-couple households, 19.5% were households with a male householder and no spouse or partner present, and 32.8% were households with a female householder and no spouse or partner present. About 34.8% of all households were made up of individuals and 16.8% had someone living alone who was 65 years of age or older.

There were 1,601 housing units, of which 14.0% were vacant. The homeowner vacancy rate was 2.1% and the rental vacancy rate was 5.1%.

Racial composition as of the 2020 census
| Race | Number | Percent |
|---|---|---|
| White | 2,940 | 91.4% |
| Black or African American | 26 | 0.8% |
| American Indian and Alaska Native | 8 | 0.2% |
| Asian | 8 | 0.2% |
| Native Hawaiian and Other Pacific Islander | 3 | 0.1% |
| Some other race | 24 | 0.7% |
| Two or more races | 207 | 6.4% |
| Hispanic or Latino (of any race) | 82 | 2.5% |

=== 2000 census ===
As of the census of 2000, there were 3,436 people, 1,382 households, and 880 families residing in the village. The population density was 1,998.8 persons per square mile (771.3/km^{2}). There were 1,553 housing units at an average density of 903.4 per square mile (348.8/km^{2}). The racial makeup of the village was 97.58% White, 0.55% African American, 0.41% Native American, 0.49% Asian, 0.06% Pacific Islander, 0.32% from other races, and 0.58% from two or more races. Hispanic or Latino of any race were 0.99% of the population.

There were 1,382 households, out of which 32.1% had children under the age of 18 living with them, 47.5% were married couples living together, 12.4% had a female householder with no husband present, and 36.3% were non-families. 30.9% of all households were made up of individuals, and 15.4% had someone living alone who was 65 years of age or older. The average household size was 2.43 and the average family size was 3.05. In the village, the population was spread out, with 25.9% under the age of 18, 8.4% from 18 to 24, 28.2% from 25 to 44, 19.5% from 45 to 64, and 18.0% who were 65 years of age or older. The median age was 38 years. For every 100 females, there were 89.7 males. For every 100 females age 18 and over, there were 85.8 males.

The median income for a household in the village was $36,731, and the median income for a family was $45,829. Males had a median income of $33,750 versus $23,313 for females. The per capita income for the village was $18,062. About 5.1% of families and 6.6% of the population were below the poverty line, including 8.6% of those under age 18 and 4.6% of those age 65 or over.

== Notable people ==
- Jose de Creeft, Spanish sculptor who created the famous statue of Alice in Wonderland in New York City's Central Park, had a house just outside Hoosick Falls. His ashes are buried beneath one of his sculptures in a park along Main street.
- Bob Eberly and Ray Eberle, brothers and Big Band singers.
- Private Harris S. Hawthorn, received the Medal of Honor for capturing Gen. Custis Lee (the son of Gen. Robert E. Lee) on April 6, 1865, at the Battle of Sailor's Creek, Virginia; he is buried in the Maple Grove Cemetery.
- Harriet Hoctor, ballerina, dancer, Broadway theatre and Hollywood actress was born in the village.
- Jenny Holzer, the conceptual artist, lives and works here.
- Grandma Moses, renowned folk artist, lived here in the latter part of her life. Her work was first discovered by an art collector who noticed one of her paintings, many of which depicted Hoosick Falls and its surroundings, hanging in a local drug store.
- Alexander Ney, the Soviet emigre artist currently lives and works here.
- Jill Reeve, Former member of the United States women's national field hockey team
- Harry Van Surdam, who "devised one of the first legal forward pass plays ever used by a college team," according to the Oklahoma Daily, in a 1966 article. In 1972, he was placed in the National Football Hall of Fame; the award hangs in the foyer of the Hoosick Falls Central School.
- Lewis A. Swyer, owner of a construction company that built many historic Albany landmarks, was born and spent early childhood in Hoosick Falls. His company, L.A. Swyer Co. Inc., built Albany landmarks including the Hilton Hotel, Ten Eyck Plaza, Twin Towers, State Street Centre, Bleecker Terrace Apartments, Albany Law School library and Temple Beth Emeth.
- George Verschoor, Verschoor developed, produced and directed the first four seasons of MTV's groundbreaking series The Real World, which launched the modern non-fiction genre and is one of the longest-running reality programs in history.
