= United States Post Office (Hoosick Falls, New York) =

- U.S. Post Office
- U.S. National Register of Historic Places
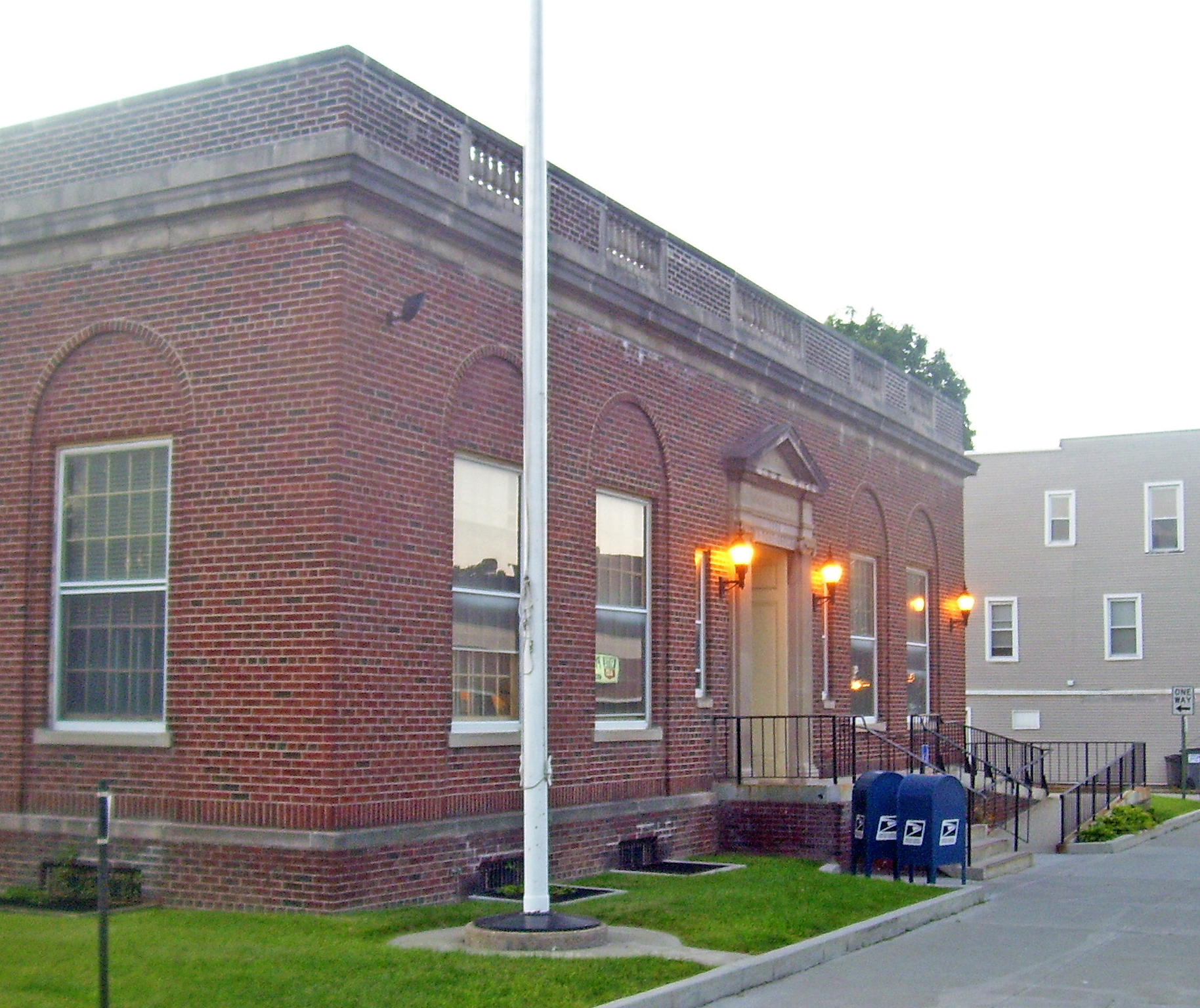
- East elevation and partial south profile, 2008

- Location within New York Location within the United States
- Interactive map showing the location for U.S. Post Office, Hoosick Falls
- Location: Hoosick Falls, NY
- Nearest city: Bennington, VT
- Coordinates: 42°54′2″N 73°21′3″W
- Area: less than one acre
- Built: 1925
- Architect: Louis A. Simon; Office of the Supervising Architect under James A. Wetmore
- Architectural style: Colonial Revival
- MPS: US Post Offices in New York State, 1858-1943, TR
- NRHP reference No.: 88002506
- Added to NRHP: November 17, 1988

The U.S. Post Office in Hoosick Falls, New York, is located on Main Street a block south of downtown. It is a brick building erected in the mid-1920s, serving the 12090 ZIP Code, which covers the village of Hoosick Falls and surrounding portions of the Town of Hoosick.

It took the government nine years to build after the land was acquired. One of several similar post offices in New York built at that time, it has retained its historic integrity better than some of the others. In 1988 it was listed on the National Register of Historic Places, the only post office in Rensselaer County besides Troy's with that distinction.

== Building ==
The post office is located two blocks from downtown Hoosick Falls, just outside the village's historic district. It is also located on the west side of Main Street, across from a small park and Hoosick Falls's village hall. A three-story mixed-use building, a contributing property to the historic district, is to the north. To the south, on the opposite corner of a small street, is a residence converted to commercial use. The post office's parking lot is on its west, with a small strip of lawn and flagpole between it and Main on the east. The ground slopes gently to the west.

It is a one-story, five-by-five-bay building of wire-cut brick, rectangular with a non-contributing loading dock added to the rear. Its raised foundation is also brick, with a stone water table. At the roofline a limestone cornice is topped with a brick parapet with limestone balusters above the front bays.

The east (front) facade has a centrally located main entrance flanked by two windows on either side set in shallow arched recesses. The entrance has a modern aluminum double door with original wooden transom inside a pair of fluted limestone Ionic pilasters topped by a plain entablature in which "U.S. POST OFFICE HOOSICK FALLS, N.Y. 12090" is carved. Two small windows are on either side. Above it is a denticulated triangular limestone pediment. Concrete steps with iron railings lead up to the entrance, with a wheelchair ramp coming in from the north.

On the north and south, the center bays have paired windows with segmental arches and brick lintels. The corner windows are identical to those on the front. Window wells let light into the basement. The rear has three original windows and the flat-roofed central wing with the loading platform.

Inside, the lobby, reached through a long vestibule with bulletin boards, is minimally decorated. The mosaic tile floor is white with a green border. Above black marble baseboards, the walls have wooden wainscoting rising to a plaster cornice at the high ceiling. Two single-paned windows with top and bottom pivots are located just below the ceiling. There are two original wooden tables with glass tops.

== History ==
In 1913 Congress authorized the construction of the new post office in Hoosick Falls, which had grown extensively during a late-19th century period of industrialization as factories and textile mills tapped the power of the Hoosic River flowing through the village. It had previously been in rented quarters on Church Street (NY 22), a block from its current location.

The authorization was followed by appropriations in the next Congresses, through 1919, making a total of $80,000 ($1,486,000 in contemporary dollars) available. After the first one, the federal government purchased the land in 1916 for $13,451 ($397,977 in contemporary dollars).

It took seven years until the post office was designed in 1923. Construction began the following year, and the new building was opened in 1925. The design is credited to the Office of the Supervising Architect under James A. Wetmore, and chief architect Louis A. Simon.

The Hoosick Falls post office is one of a group of six similar post offices built in New York State around the mid-1920s. They all show the strong classical influences on the style, with symmetrical front facades with recessed arcading and pediments and pilasters as ornamentation. Two of them — Owego and Waterloo — are listed on the Register as well, while the other three (Cohoes, Saranac Lake and Walden) are not due to loss of integrity. A similar design was used for the Lyons post office six years later.

In 1956, the loading dock was added to the rear. Other than that, there have been no other significant additions to the building.

== See also ==
- National Register of Historic Places listings in Rensselaer County, New York
