= Hoosick Falls Historic District =

Historic district in New York, United States

- U.S. National Register of Historic Places
- U.S. Historic district
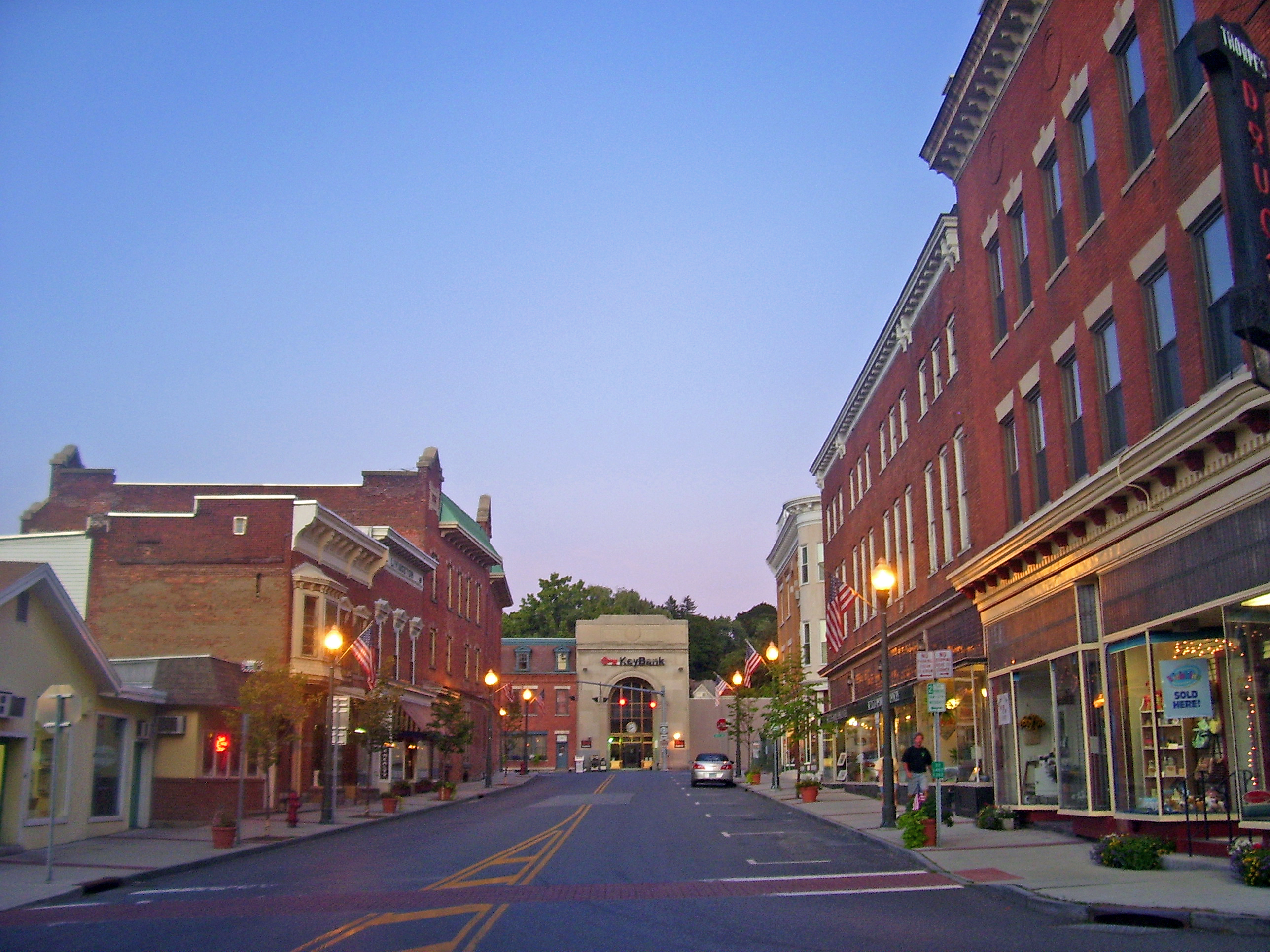
- View from Church Street along John Street to Main Street, 2008

- Location within New York Location within the United States
- Location: Hoosick Falls, NY
- Nearest city: Bennington, VT
- Coordinates: 42°54′5″N 73°21′3″W
- Area: 8 acres (3.2 ha)
- Built: late 19th-early 20th century
- Architectural style: Italianate, Second Empire
- NRHP reference No.: 80004280
- Added to NRHP: December 3, 1980

The Hoosick Falls Historic District is located in the downtown section of the village of that name in New York, United States. It is an eight-acre (3.2-ha) area concentrated along Church, Classic and John streets (NY 22) south of the Hoosick River.

Most of its 40 buildings remain largely intact from the late 19th and early 20th centuries, a period when Hoosick Falls was economically prosperous due to the mills and factories that drew on the river and its power. In 1980 it was recognized as a historic district and added to the National Register of Historic Places.

== Geography ==
The district is shaped roughly like an upside down letter "L", around the axis of the three streets Route 22 follows through that area of the village. It starts in the south with the properties at 59 and 60 Church Street, a few lots north of Elm Street. Just north of the post office it moves west to take in the properties on the west side of Main Street, then the properties on the east side of Main at the John Street intersection.

It continues along the south side of Classic Street to the east line of the properties one lot west of where High Street carries 22 north toward Cambridge. From there it continues north to the river, then west along its bank to Church Street. At Classic it extends westward to include the properties on the west side, and then returns to where it began.

In this area there are 40 buildings. Many are commercial or mixed-use multistory structures dating from the 1880s to the 1920s. Only one is a modern intrusion. Most are in the predominant styles of their era, primarily Italianate and Second Empire, with a few Georgian Revival structures from the 20th century. The few residences are mostly in the Stick-Eastlake style of the late 19th century. Open space consists of a few vacant lots and one parking lot.

== History ==
Hoosick Falls was first settled by two men from Connecticut just before the Revolutionary War. After the war, they built a gristmill on the river and the first bridge. In 1827, a half-century after its founding, the settlement was incorporated as a village.

Other entrepreneurs from New England came to the village to set up textile mills along the river as well. The most prominent manufacturer in the village, Walter A. Wood, came in 1836. He patented a mower 17 years later, in 1853, and began manufacturing both mowers and reapers. After the Civil War, his company, the Walter A. Wood Mowing and Reaping Machine Manufactory, moved into an old cotton factory on the north side of the Hoosick. Four years later a new facility had to be built.

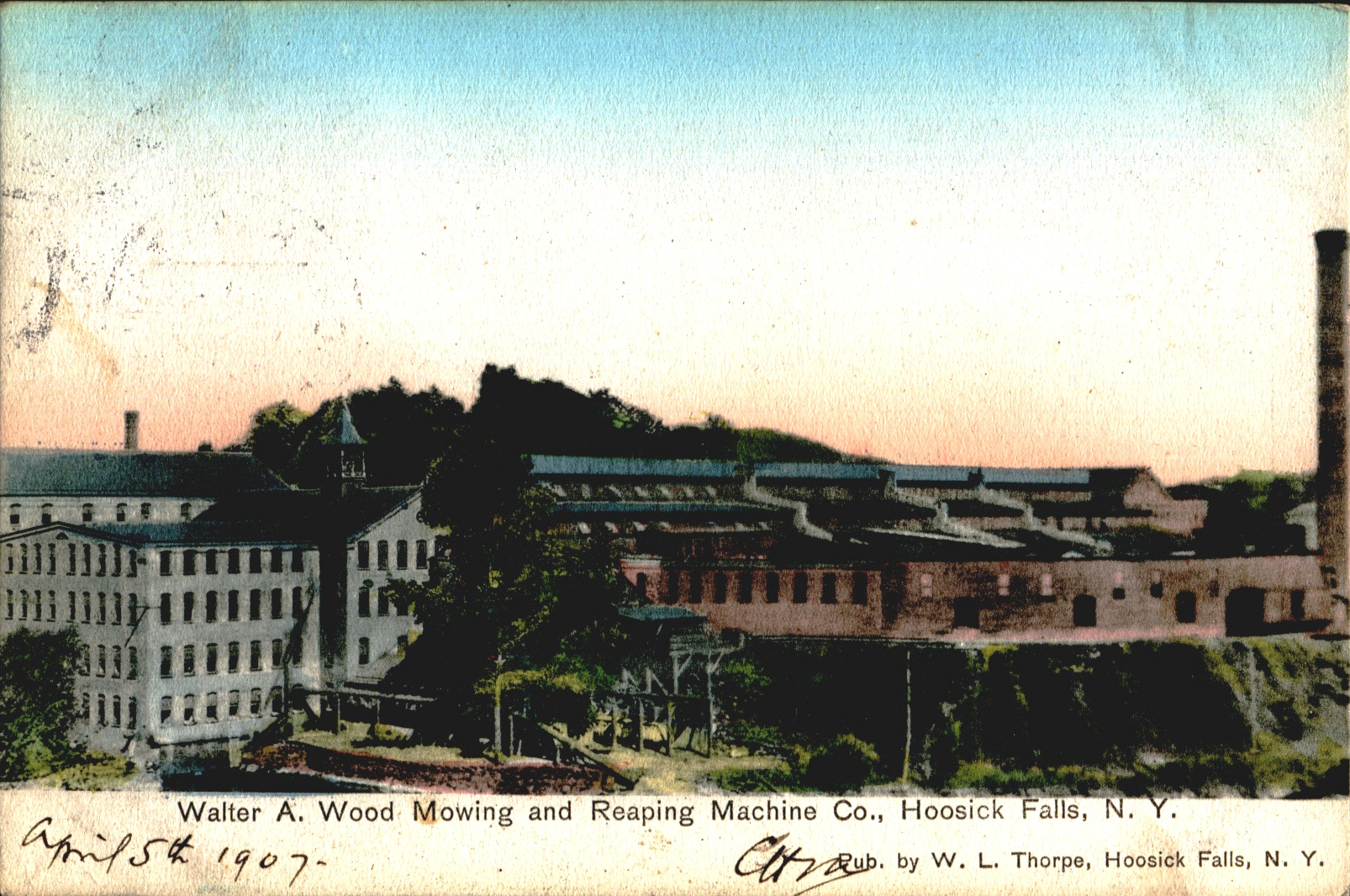
Wood Factory

Wood's company became the world's leading manufacturer in its product line by the end of the century. At its peak it employed 2,000 local residents, and Wood served two terms as a member of the House of Representatives for the district. He built the large three-story Wood Block, which dominates downtown Hoosick Falls. The company eventually closed in 1924 after competition from John Deere's motorized equipment, fires and other means of generating power for business made it less profitable.

== See also ==
- National Register of Historic Places listings in Rensselaer County, New York
