= Walter A. Wood =

American politician

Walter Abbott Wood
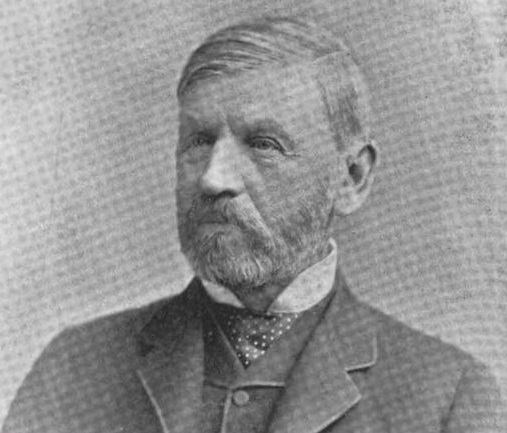

Member of the U.S. House of Representatives from New York's 17th district
- In office March 4, 1879 – March 3, 1883
- Preceded by: Martin I. Townsend
- Succeeded by: Henry G. Burleigh

Personal details
- Born: October 23, 1815 Mason, New Hampshire, U.S.
- Died: January 15, 1892 (aged 76) Hoosick Falls, New York, U.S.
- Resting place: Maple Grove Cemetery; Hoosick Falls, New York
- Party: Republican
- Spouse(s): Bessie A. Parsons Wood; Elizabeth Nicholls Wood
- Children: James T. Wood; Lyn P. Wood; Walter A. Wood; Julia Wood Blackinton
- Profession: Inventor; Manufacturer; Politician; Farmer

Walter Abbott Wood (October 23, 1815 – January 15, 1892) was an American politician and a U.S. Representative representing New York’s 17th congressional district from 1879 to 1883.

== Early life ==
Born in Mason, New Hampshire, Wood moved to New York in 1816 with his parents, who settled in Rensselaerville. He attended the common schools.

== Career ==
Wood moved to Hoosick Falls in 1835, and worked in the blacksmithing department of the manufacturing establishment of Parsons and Wilder for four years.

After working in a carriage factory in Nashville, Tennessee, Wood returned to Hoosick and in partnership with John White manufactured iron mould-board plows (patented by a kinsman, Jethro Wood).

In 1852 Wood organized the firm of Wood and Parsons and manufactured mowing and reaping machines under the patents of John H. Manny. By invention and improvement, and patent, he perfected the Walter A. Wood Mower and Reaper. His firm grew from the manufacture of only two machines in 1852 to more than 8,000 in 1865. The machine won him more than 1,200 different prizes including gold and silver medals. In 1867 he was decorated by Napoleon III with the Cross of the Legion of Honor; and in Vienna in 1878 he was decorated by the Emperor with the Imperial Order of Franz Joseph. In 1873, Wood built a large mansion on more than 1,000 acres that extended into East Hoosick. He operated a large farm.

Elected as a Republican to the Forty-sixth and Forty-seventh Congresses representing the seventeenth district of New York, Wood served from (March 4, 1879 – March 3, 1883). He returned to Hoosick Falls, New York, and resumed his former pursuits. He served as president of the village of Hoosick Falls and as president of the board of education.

== Death ==
Wood died of pneumonia in Hoosick Falls, New York, on January 15, 1892 (age 76 years, 84 days). He is interred in Maple Grove Cemetery, Hoosick Falls, New York.

== Family life ==
Wood was the son of Aaron and Rebecca Wood and married Bessie A. Parsons in 1842 and they had two sons. Bessie died in 1886 and he married Elizabeth Warren in 1888 with whom he had a son, Walter A. Wood, Jr., and a daughter, Julia N. Wood.

U.S. House of Representatives
Preceded by Martin I. Townsend	Member of the U.S. House of Representatives from New York's 17th congressional district 1879–1883	Succeeded by Henry G. Burleigh
