= Lewis A. Swyer =

American businessman

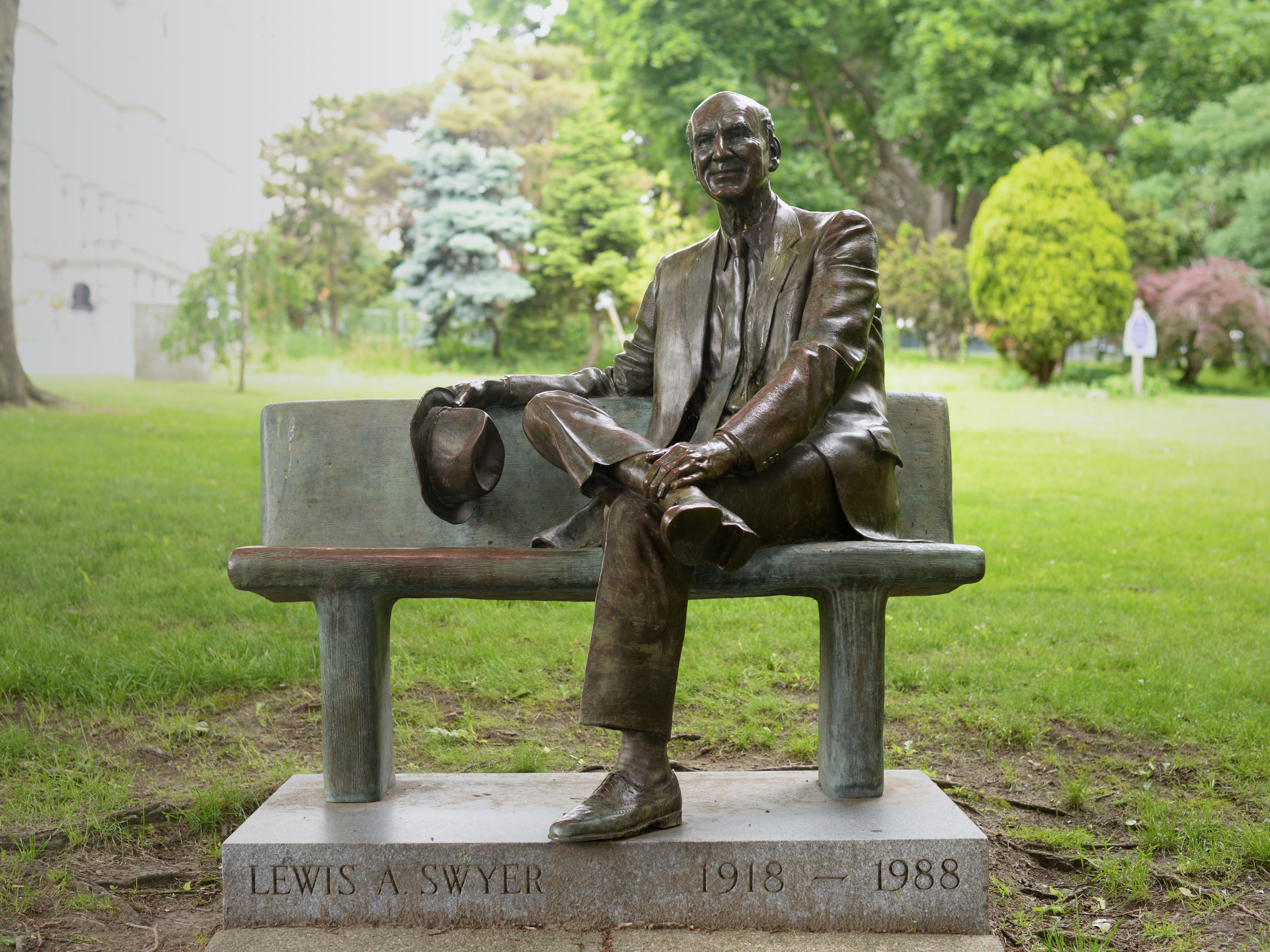
- Statue of Swyer near the New York State Capitol in Albany
- Born: June 9, 1918; Hoosick Falls, New York, U.S.
- Died: December 25, 1988 (aged 70); Albany, New York, U.S.
- Occupations: Businessman; construction executive
- Known for: Founder of the L. A. Swyer Construction Company

Lewis A. Swyer (June 9, 1918 – December 25, 1988) was an American businessman who founded the L. A. Swyer Construction Company.

== Biography ==
Born in Hoosick Falls, New York, Swyer served in the U.S. Navy during World War II and established his construction firm in Albany in 1947. His company was known for several building projects, including synagogues, churches, and hotels.

Swyer also held positions as the chairman of the Saratoga Performing Arts Center and was a board member for institutions such as the State University of New York at Albany and Skidmore College. He died at age 70 in St. Peter's Hospital, Albany.
