= Walloomsac, New York =

Historic location in Rensselaer County, New York, United States

Coordinates: 42°55′27″N 73°19′25″W

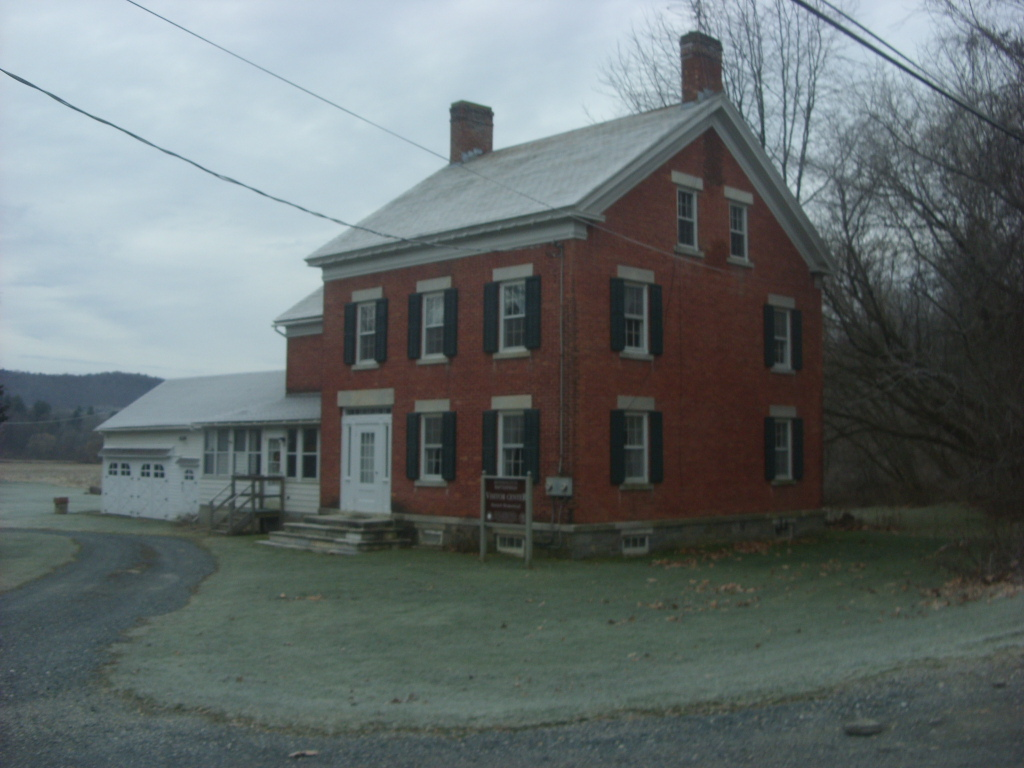
House in Walloomsac

Walloomsac, New York is a location in the northeast part of the Town of Hoosick, in Rensselaer County, New York on the Walloomsac River. It is to the east, and upstream, from North Hoosick, New York. It includes the Bennington Battlefield, which was fought on both sides of the river and listed on the National Register of Historic Places in 1966.
