= Boonton Historic District =

- U.S. National Register of Historic Places
- U.S. Historic district
- New Jersey Register of Historic Places
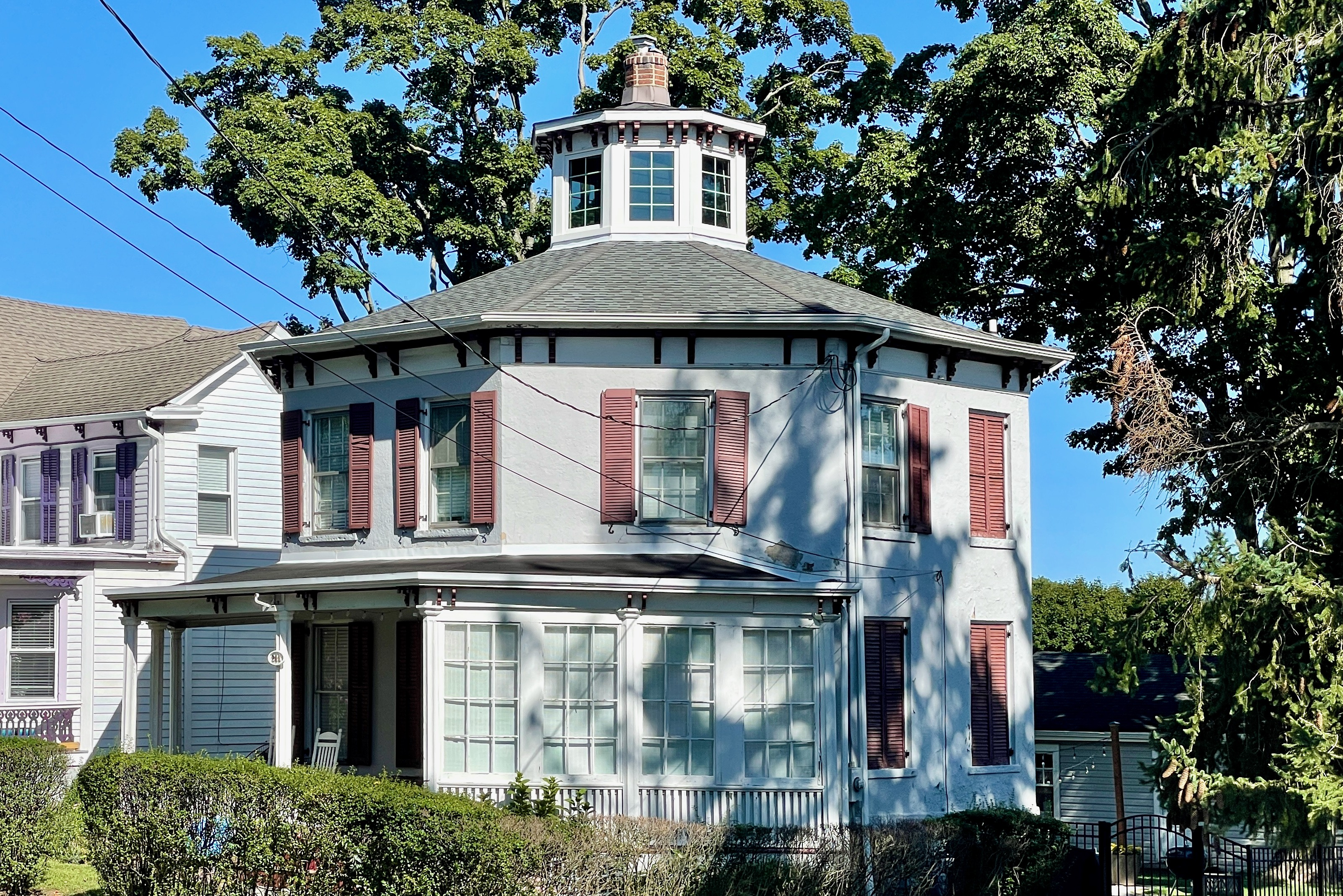
- Garret Rickards House, an octagon house

- Location within Morris County, New Jersey Location within New Jersey Location within the United States
- Location: Main, Church, Birch, Cornelia, and Cedar Streets; Boonton, New Jersey
- Coordinates: 40°54′22″N 74°24′37″W
- Area: 9 acres (3.6 ha)
- Architect: Richard Upjohn, others
- Architectural style: Greek Revival, Italianate
- NRHP reference No.: 80002509
- NJRHP No.: 2085

Significant dates
- Added to NRHP: September 29, 1980
- Designated NJRHP: January 14, 1980

The Boonton Historic District is a 9-acre (3.6 ha) historic district along Main, Church, Birch, Cornelia, and Cedar Streets in the town of Boonton in Morris County, New Jersey. It was added to the National Register of Historic Places on September 29, 1980, for its significance in architecture. The district has 22 contributing buildings, including the Boonton Public Library, which was previously listed individually on the NRHP.

== History and description ==
The development of Boonton began with the construction of the Morris Canal along the Rockaway River from 1829 to 1830. The New Jersey Iron Company was organized and bought 200 acres (81 ha) of land here to construct an ironworks and company town. The district encompasses a residential section of the town and includes buildings that show the architectural changes from 1830 to 1890. In 1833, three houses had been built on Church Street, one of the first streets running uphill from Main Street. The public library was built c. 1849 and features Greek Revival architecture. The Garret Rickards House, at 211 Cornelia Street, is one of two octagon houses in the district. It was built c. 1854 based on the designs by Orson Squire Fowler and shows Italianate style. The First Presbyterian Church on the corner of Church and Birch Streets was built 1859–1860 and features Greek Revival and Gothic Revival styles. St. John's Episcopal Church on Cornelia Street was designed by architect Richard Upjohn. It was built in 1863 with Carpenter Gothic style. The other octagon house, the Nathaniel Myers House, at 224 Cornelia Street, also built c.1854, was acquired by St. John's Episcopal to serve as a rectory.

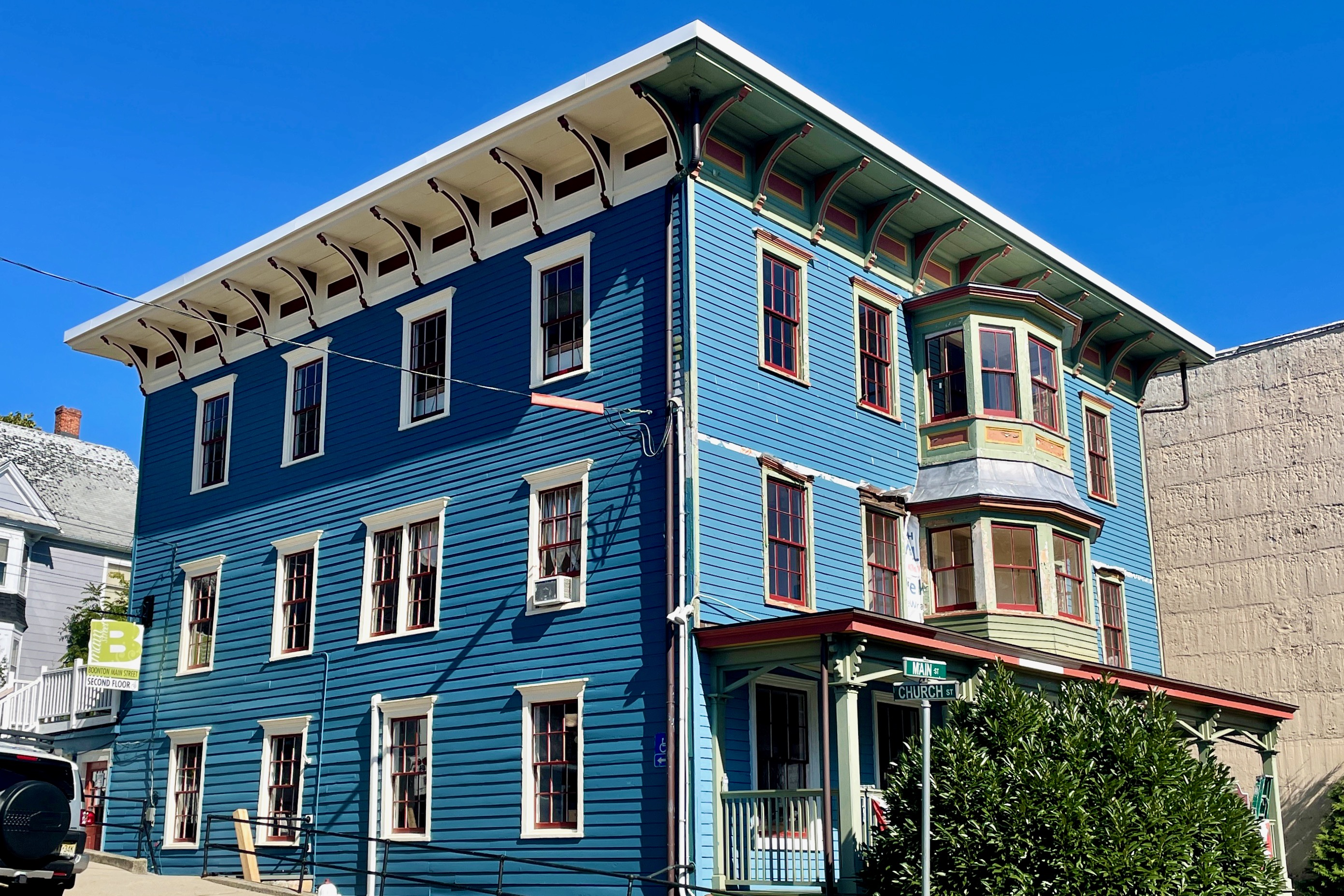
Boonton Public Library

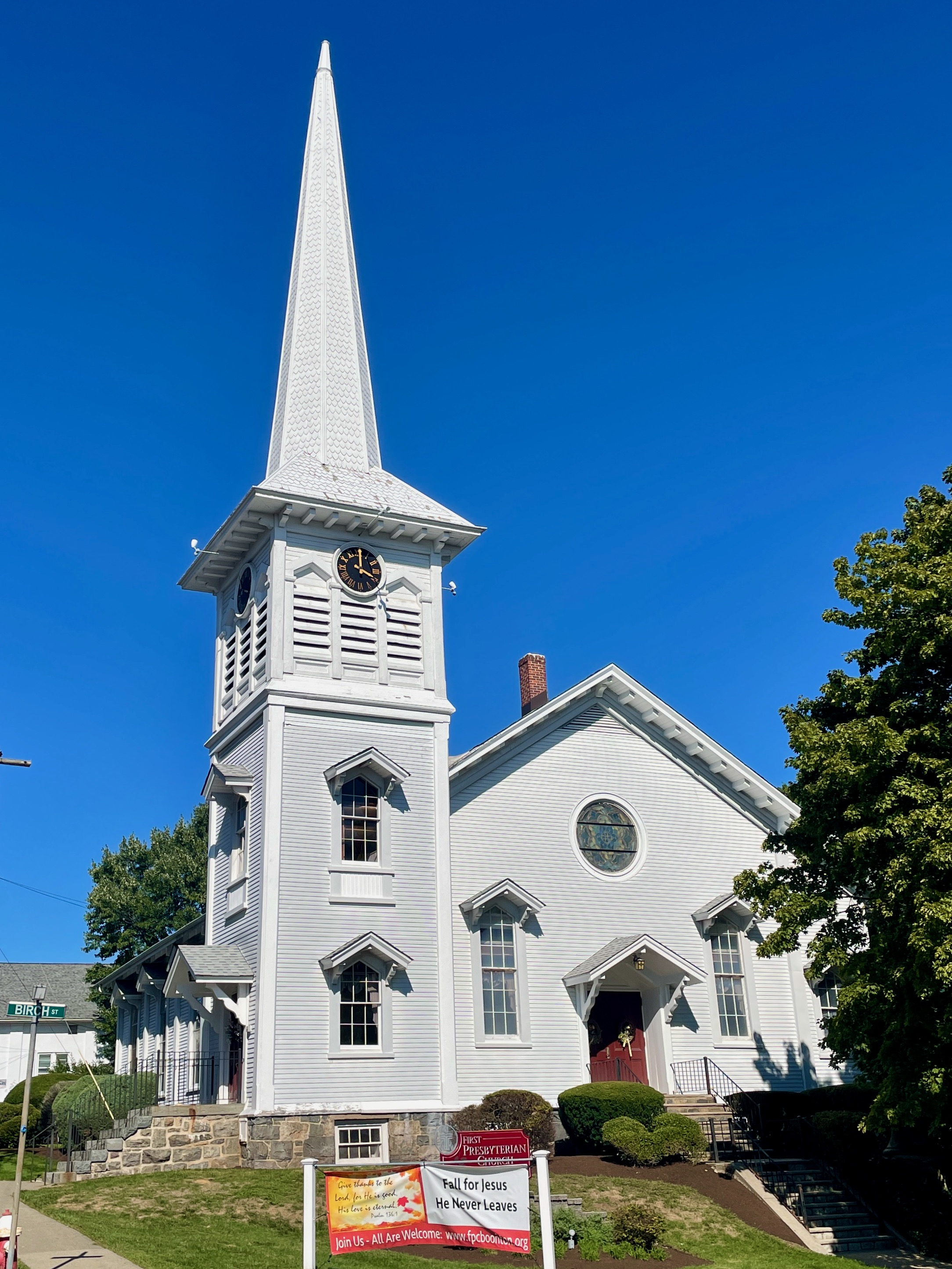
First Presbyterian Church

== See also ==
- National Register of Historic Places listings in Morris County, New Jersey
- List of octagon houses
- Boonton Historical Society and Museum
