= Boonton Public Library =

Historic library building in New Jersey, United States

- U.S. National Register of Historic Places
- U.S. Historic district – Contributing property
- New Jersey Register of Historic Places
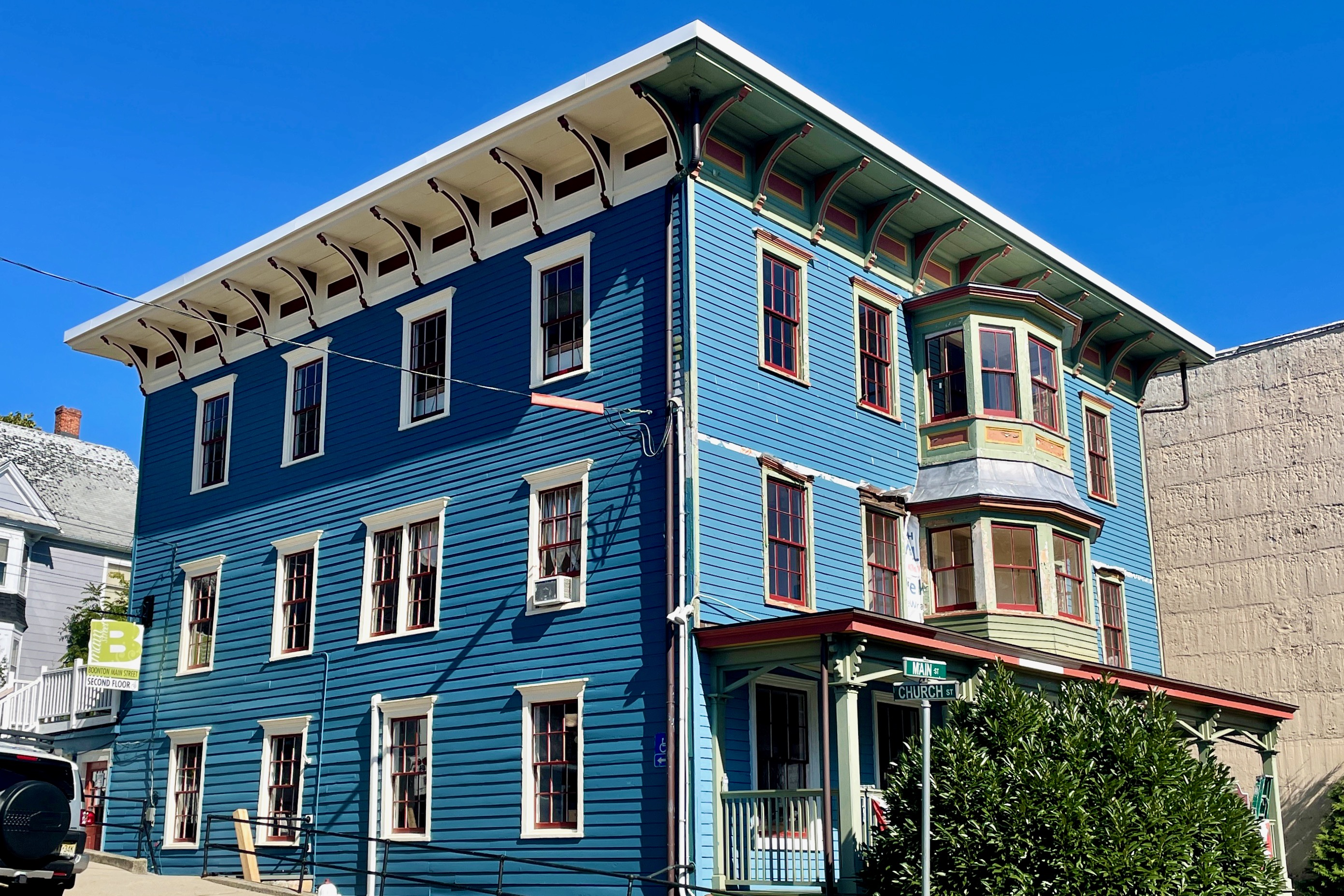
- The Holmes Library in 2022

- Location within Morris County, New Jersey Location within New Jersey Location within the United States
- Location: 619 Main Street; Boonton, New Jersey
- Coordinates: 40°54′19″N 74°24′39″W
- Built: 1849
- Architectural style: Greek Revival
- Part of: Boonton Historic District (ID80002509)
- NRHP reference No.: 72000804
- NJRHP No.: 2086

Significant dates
- Added to NRHP: November 13, 1972
- Designated CP: September 29, 1980
- Designated NJRHP: October 26, 1972

The Boonton Public Library, also known as the Holmes Library, is located at 619 Main Street in the town of Boonton in Morris County, New Jersey. Built c. 1849, the Greek Revival building was purchased by James Holmes in 1856 and became the public library in 1893. It was added to the National Register of Historic Places on November 13, 1972, for its significance in communications, education, and social history. It was added as a contributing property to the Boonton Historic District on September 29, 1980.

== History and description ==
In 1849, Eliza Ann Scott purchased the lot on the corner of Main and Church streets from the New Jersey Iron Company and soon built a two-story building, which was apparently used for commerce. In 1856, she sold it for $5,000 to James Holmes (1815–1893), who was superintendent of the Taylor & Lord Nail Factory and one of the wealthiest individuals in the community. He then used the building as his residence and c. 1874 added a third story. Upon his death in 1893, the property was bequeathed to the Boonton Public Library Association, along with $8,000 to fund its operation. Since the building was larger than the library needed, the extra space was rented to various organizations. In 1895, printing presses for The Boonton Times were installed in the basement. The library has been serving the town since 1894.

== See also ==
- National Register of Historic Places listings in Morris County, New Jersey
