= Boonton Historical Society and Museum =

Coordinates: 40.90186°N 74.40695°W

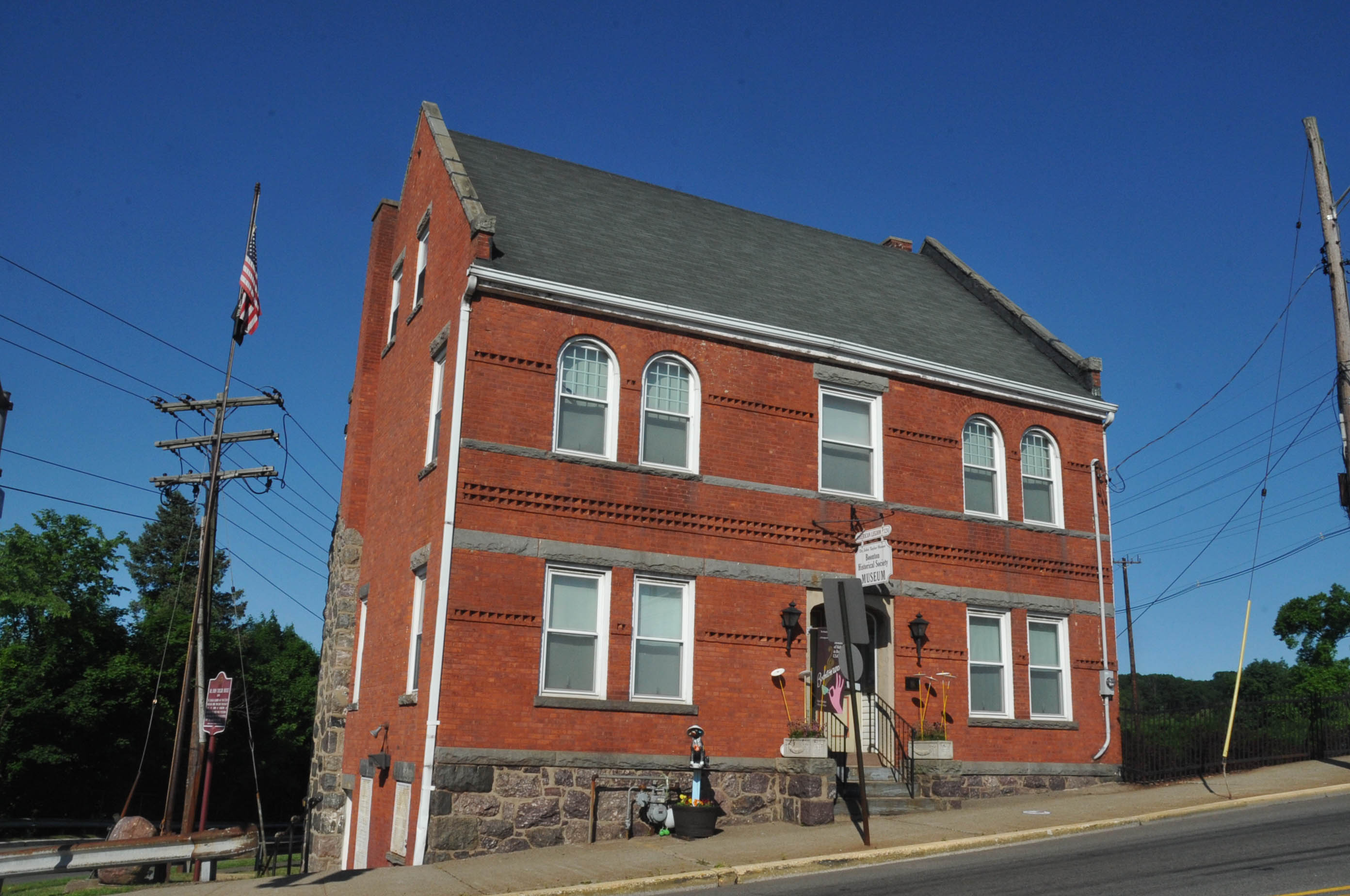
Boonton Historical Society and Museum

The Boonton Historical Society and Museum, is located at 210 Main Street in Boonton, New Jersey. The building was constructed in 1898 as a private residence for Dr. John Taylor and his wife Adelaide Kanouse. Since 1959, the building has served as local history museum beneath the auspices of the Boonton Historical Society.

== History ==
In 1897, John L. Kanouse gave the lot on which the house now stands as a Christmas gift to his daughter Adelaide T. Kanouse and her husband, Dr. John Taylor. Some believe this gift may have been intended to encourage the couple to depart their residence of 15 years in Succasunna and Mount Arlington, to move closer, which they subsequently did in 1898 with Dr. Taylor continuing his medical practice at the location.

The brick building is 4 stories tall, built on a hill with steps leading up to the living levels on the front and ground level access to what was one time basement space at the rear. As was common during this era, parts of the home were used as office space for Taylor's medical practice, perhaps one reason why a lot located on Main Street was selected.

In 1901, Adelaide Kanouse's ailing parents moved into the home. This arrangement was short-lived because her father died in 1905 and her mother in 1908.

The structure moved out of Taylor's hands in 1917 as Dr. Taylor moved to Chula Vista, California and his associate, Dr. Peck departed to serve in World War I and thus did not take over the practice.

At the close of the war, American Legion Post #124 was formed of returning veterans who utilized the structure and subsequently the Mayor and Alderman formally purchased the structure for dedication as that organization's headquarters.

On November 11, 1980, the Boonton Historical Society opened the doors to its museum on the 2nd floor, courtesy of the American Legion Post #124.

In 1990, the building was closed for restoration and reopened in 1997, serving the region as Boonton's local history museum ever since.

== See also ==
- Boonton Historic District
