= Feusier Octagon House =

Historic house in California, United States

- U.S. National Register of Historic Places
- San Francisco Designated Landmark
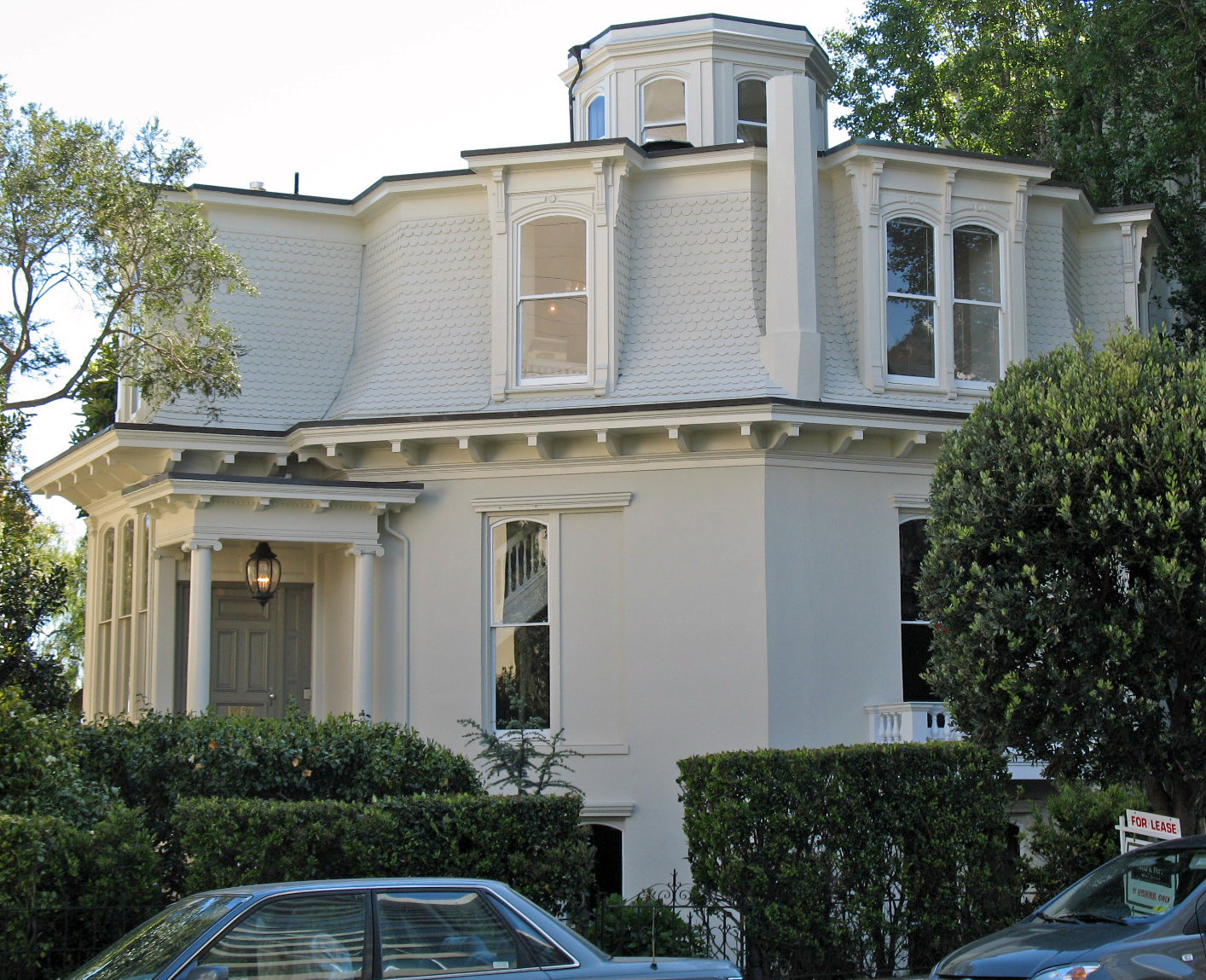
- Feusier Octagon House

- Location within San Francisco County Location within California Location within the United States
- Location: 1067 Green Street, San Francisco, California
- Coordinates: 37°47′54″N 122°24′56″W
- Built: 1857
- Architectural style: Octagon Mode
- NRHP reference No.: 74000554
- SFDL No.: 36

Significant dates
- Added to NRHP: March 24, 1974
- Designated SFDL: October 1, 1970

The Feusier Octagon House is an historic octagonal house built in c. 1857, and located in the Russian Hill neighborhood of San Francisco, California.

It was listed as a San Francisco Designated Landmark on October 1, 1970, and was added to the National Register of Historic Places on March 24, 1974. The house is also part of the Russian Hill-Paris Block Architectural District.

== History ==
The Feusier Octagon House is located at 1067 Green Street in San Francisco. It was built between 1857 and 1858 by George Kenny, who sold it in 1870 to Louis Feusier. The house was later expanded with a third story, mansard roof, and cupola.

As of 2018 it was a rental house, before being put up for sale in 2021 for US$8.6 million.

The Feusier Octagon House, McElroy Octagon House, and the Marine Exchange Lookout Station at Land's End are the only three remaining octagon houses in the city.

Image	Name	Address
	Feusier Octagon House	1067 Green Street, San Francisco
	McElroy Octagon House	2645 Gough Street, San Francisco
	the Marine Exchange Lookout Station	Land's End, San Francisco

== See also ==
- McElroy Octagon House
- List of San Francisco Designated Landmarks
