= McElroy Octagon House =

Historic house in California, United States

- U.S. National Register of Historic Places
- San Francisco Designated Landmark
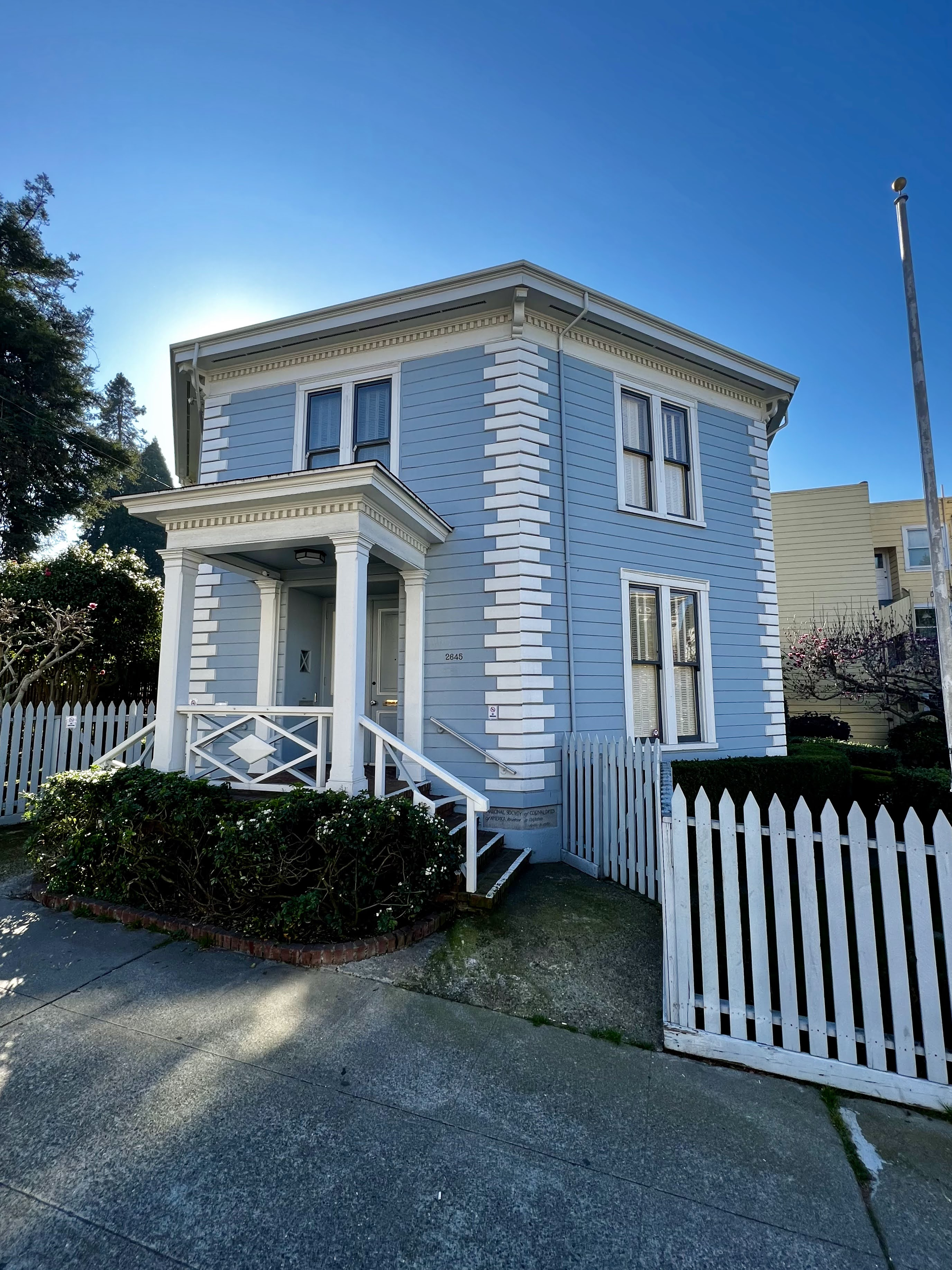
- The McElroy Octagon House in Gough St. San Francisco, California; structural concrete construction (built 1861)

- Location within San Francisco County Location within California
- Location: San Francisco, California
- Coordinates: 37°47′52″N 122°25′39″W
- Built: 1861
- Architectural style: Octagon Mode
- NRHP reference No.: 72000250
- SFDL No.: 17

Significant dates
- Added to NRHP: February 23, 1972
- Designated SFDL: February 3, 1969

The McElroy Octagon House, also known as the Colonial Dames Octagon House, is a historic octagonal house now located at 2645 Gough Street at Union Street in the Cow Hollow neighborhood of San Francisco, California, United States.

It was listed as a San Francisco Designated Landmark on February 3, 1969, and was added to the National Register of Historic Places on February 23, 1972.

The house is open to the public for tours.

== History ==
William C. McElroy (?–1869) and his spouse Harriet Shober (1816–1899) bought the lot across the street from the house's current location on Gough Street in 1859. McElroy was a wood miller by trade and he built the house between 1860 and 1861. Originally the house was designed with two floors (four rooms on each floor) with a winding staircase in the middle of the building. The McElroy family lived in the house until around the 1880s when the house became a rental property. Daniel O’Connell, a co-founder of the Bohemian Club, was one of the rental tenants. In April 1906 the house was badly damaged during the 1906 Earthquake. By 1909 the house was no longer owned by the McElroy family and it changed ownership many times.

The house was vacant and neglected in 1951 when the National Society of the Colonial Dames of America in California bought it, moved it across the street and began its restoration. The house was restored by the University of California, Berkeley's former Dean of Architecture, Warren C. Perry. During the restoration, the original layout of the house was changed so it would be more functional as an event space. By 1953 the building opened as a museum.

The original location of the house (across the street) contains condominiums that were built on the property in 1955.

McElroy Octagon House, Feusier Octagon House, and the Marine Exchange Lookout Station at Land's End are the only three remaining octagon houses in the city.

== See also ==
- List of San Francisco Designated Landmarks
- National Register of Historic Places listings in San Francisco
- Nathanial Brittan Party House
