= Nathanial Brittan Party House =

- Nathaniel Brittan Party House
- U.S. National Register of Historic Places
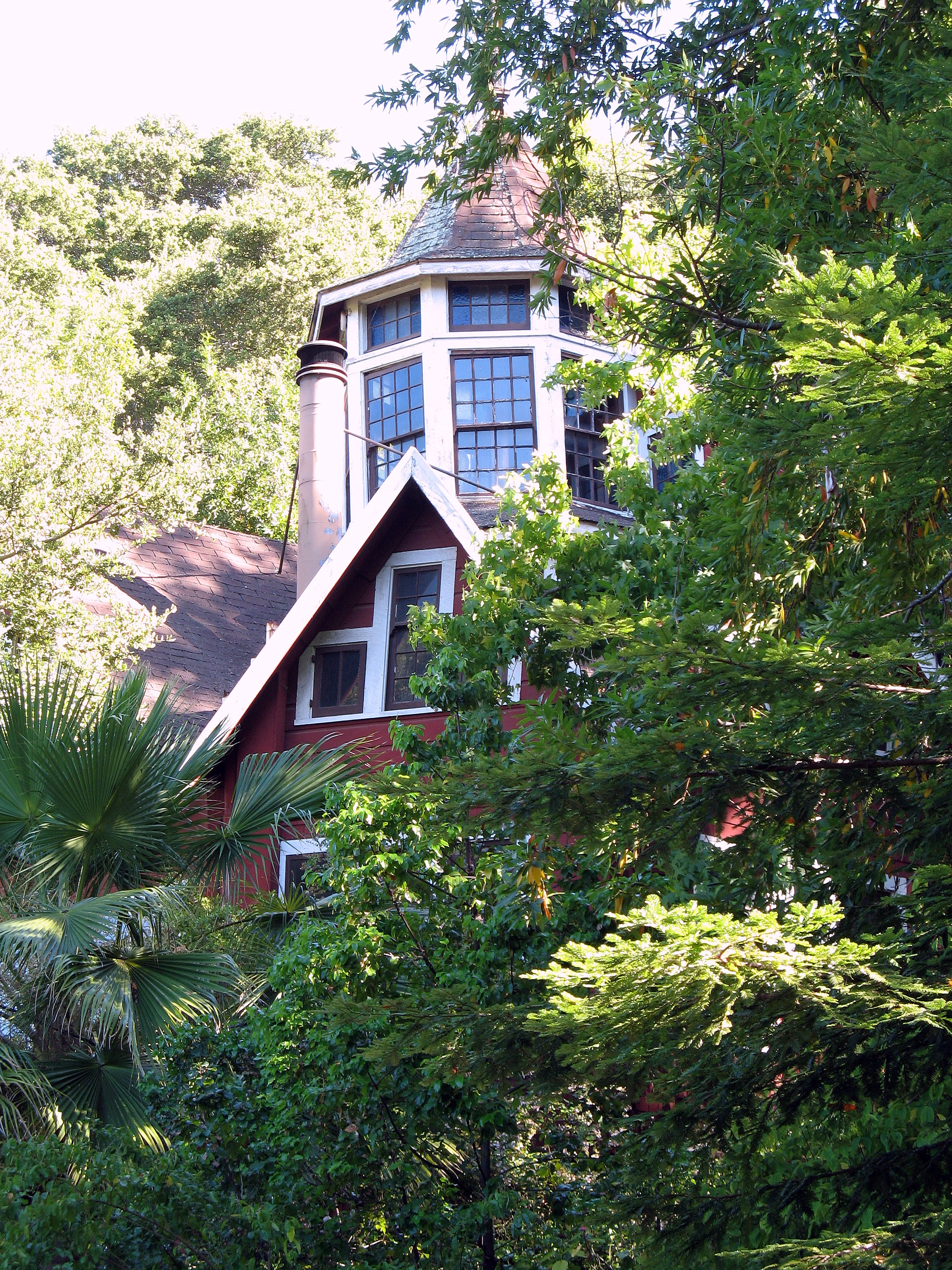

- Location within San Francisco Bay Area Location within California Location within the United States
- Location: 125 Dale Ave., San Carlos, California
- Coordinates: 37°30′01.5″N 122°16′19.9″W
- Area: less than 1 acre (4,000 m^{2})
- Built: 1872
- Architectural style: Octagon Mode
- NRHP reference No.: 94001500
- Added to NRHP: December 29, 1994

The Nathanial Brittan Party House, also known as Nathaniel Brittan Party House, the Brittan Party House, and the Brittan Lodge, is located at 125 Dale Avenue in San Carlos, California, and was built in 1872. It was listed on the National Register of Historic Places in 1994.

== History ==
John Wesley Brittan (1812–1872), owner of Brittan & Holbrook, was a successful hardware store merchant during the gold rush in San Francisco. John Brittan bought 3,000 acres (1,200 ha) of the Rancho de las Pulgas, in what is now San Carlos, and it was named "Brittan Ranch". His son Nathaniel Jones Brittan (1848–1912) inherited approximately one third of his father's estate, an early settler in San Carlos where he kept his "country house".

Nathaniel Brittan co-founded the Bohemian Club of San Francisco in 1872, and by 1892 Brittan was the president of the club. He built the Nathaniel Brittan Party House in order to entertain his friends from the club and to use as a hunting lodge. The Brittan Manor House (1888), Brittan's former residence, is located about a half-block away at 40 Pine Avenue.

The Nathaniel Brittan Party House was built in 1872, as a Victorian-style, two-and-a-half story redwood framed structure with an octagonal folly. There is a shiplap exterior siding that appears to go in multiple directions. The building has steep gables and an octagonal windowed cupola. It is one of the few remaining examples of nineteenth century Octagon Mode buildings in the San Francisco Bay Area.

== See also ==
- National Register of Historic Places listings in San Mateo County, California
- McElroy Octagon House
