= Robert Waugh House =

Historic house in Illinois, United States

- U.S. National Register of Historic Places
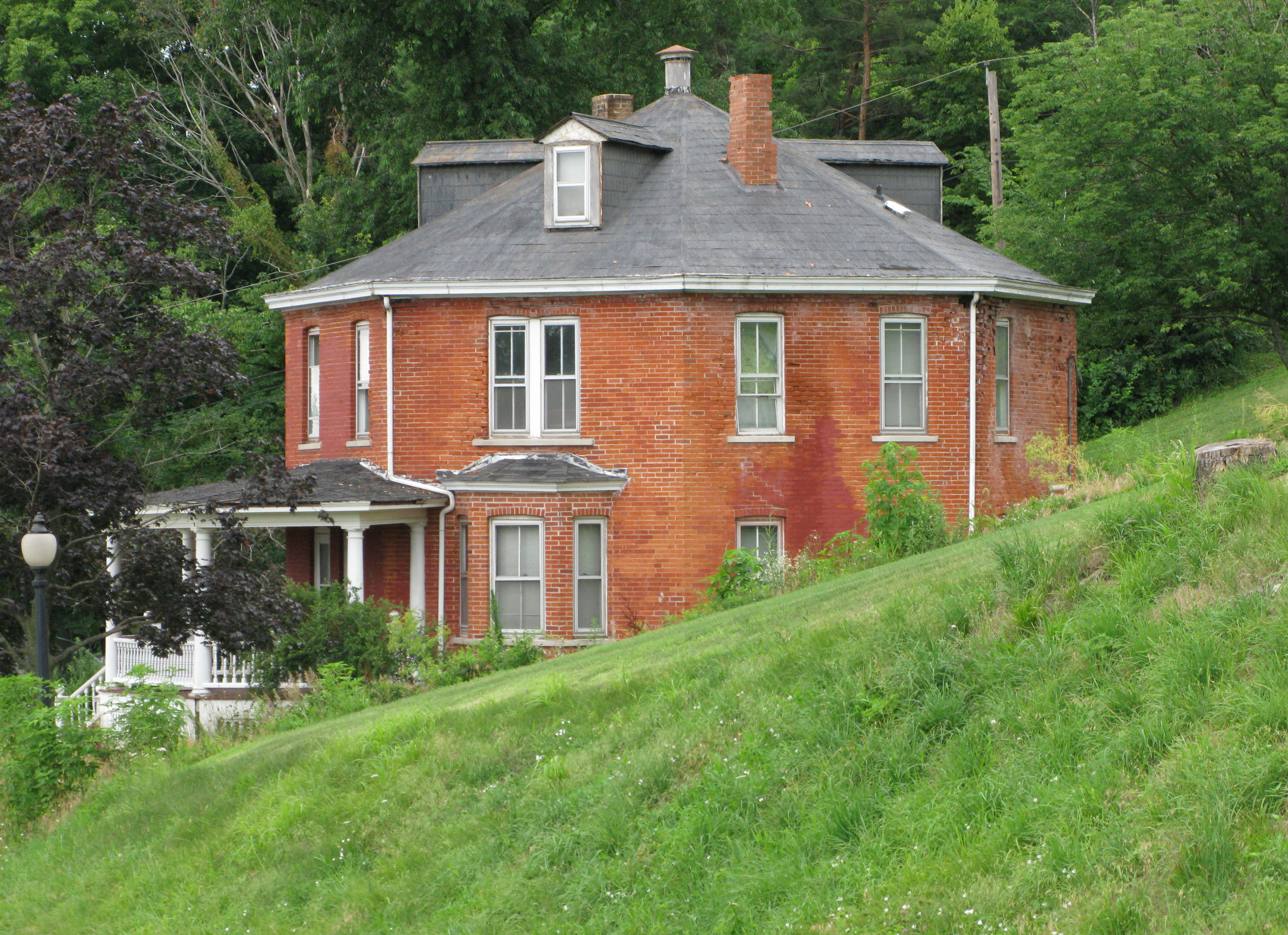

- Location within Illinois Location within the United States
- Interactive map showing the location of Robert Waugh House
- Location: 202 School St., Sparland, Illinois
- Coordinates: 41°1′45.5″N 89°26′25.8″W
- Area: less than one acre
- Built: 1887
- NRHP reference No.: 78001170
- Added to NRHP: October 4, 1978

The Robert Waugh House, also known as the Sparland Octagonal House, is located in the Marshall County village of Sparland, Illinois, on a steep hillside overlooking the Illinois River. The house has been listed on the National Register of Historic Places since October 1978. The house was built by Robert Waugh, on land purchased for the sum of 25 dollars. It is the only site in Marshall County listed in the Register. It is a private residence and has "pie-shaped rooms around a central spiral staircase".

== History ==
Robert Waugh was born in Selkirkshire, Scotland in 1838 and immigrated to the United States in 1850. He settled in Marshall County, Illinois in 1853. In 1870, Waugh opened a dry goods store on Ferry Street in the town of Sparland. Waugh initially lived in the apartment above his store. In 1886, he purchased a property and commissioned an octagon house. It is uncertain why Waugh chose this relatively obscure style, although it is possible that he was aware of another octagon house approximately 10 miles (16 km) southeast of Sparland. Marshall moved in upon its completion in 1887 and lived there until 1913. At this point, Waugh's business partner, Andrew Aitchison, purchased the property. The house remained in the Aitchison family until 1973. As of 1978, it was one of only ten remaining octagon houses in Illinois; the Waugh House is the only remaining one made of brick. Furthermore, the Waugh House is one of the few that is unaltered since completion. On October 4, 1978, the house was recognized by the National Park Service with a listing on the National Register of Historic Places.

== Architecture ==
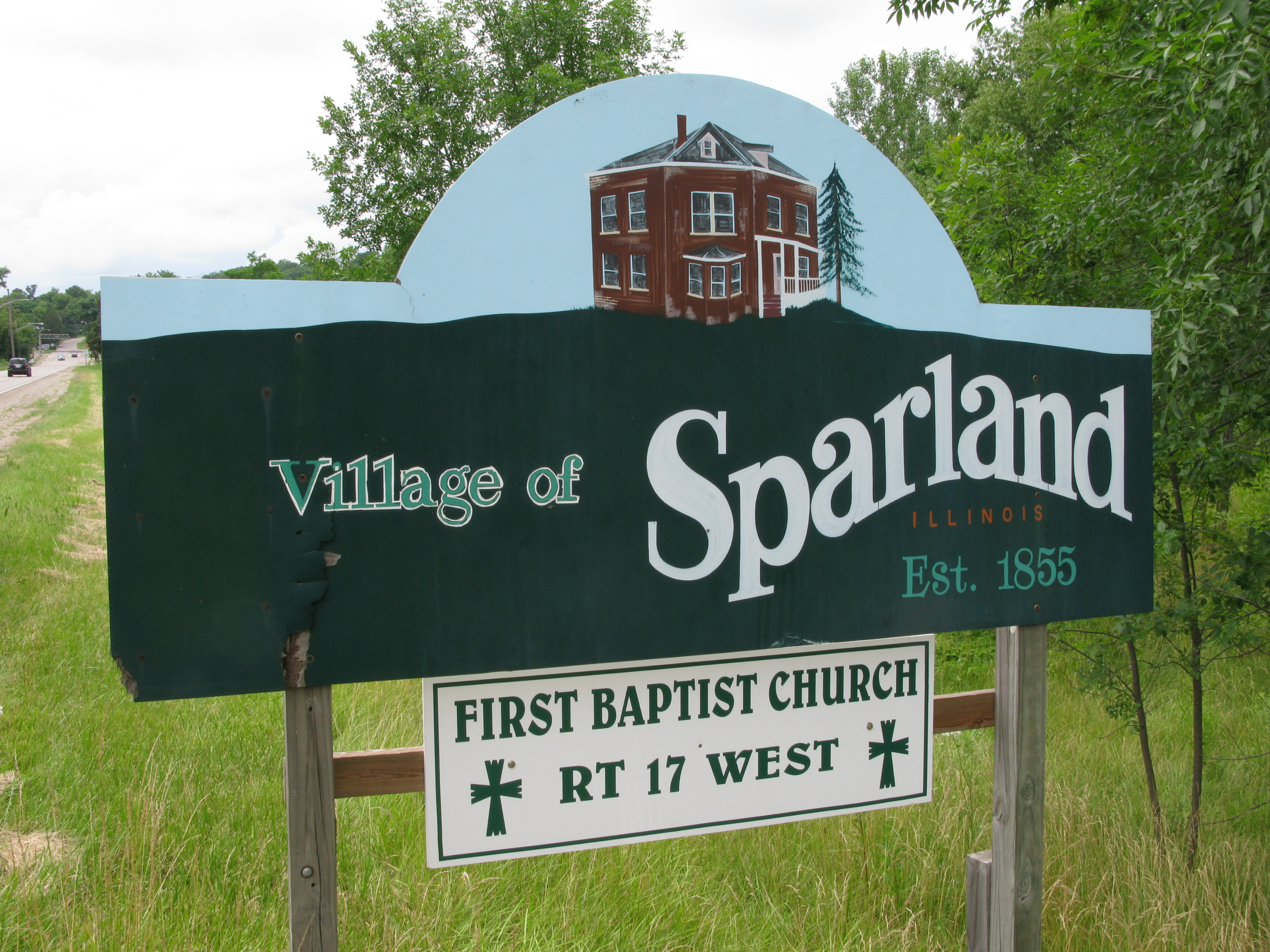
Sparland signboard featuring the octagon house

The Robert Waugh House is a two and a half story octagonal house. The red brick house sits on a coursed limestone foundation. All eight facades are 16 feet (4.9 m) long. The roof is low pitched and has three gabled dormers. The main facade faces east toward School Street and has a single-story hexagonal porch. The porch has six doric order columns and a simple balustrade. The adjacent facades (northeast and southeast) feature a first-story three-windowed bay. Above these bays are a grouped pair of double hung windows. The other five facades have two-over-two double hung windows. All windows have stone stills and have a shallow brick arch. The house is relatively simple and lacks ornamentation.

== See also ==
- List of octagon houses
