= Octagon house =

North American house style briefly popular in the 1850s

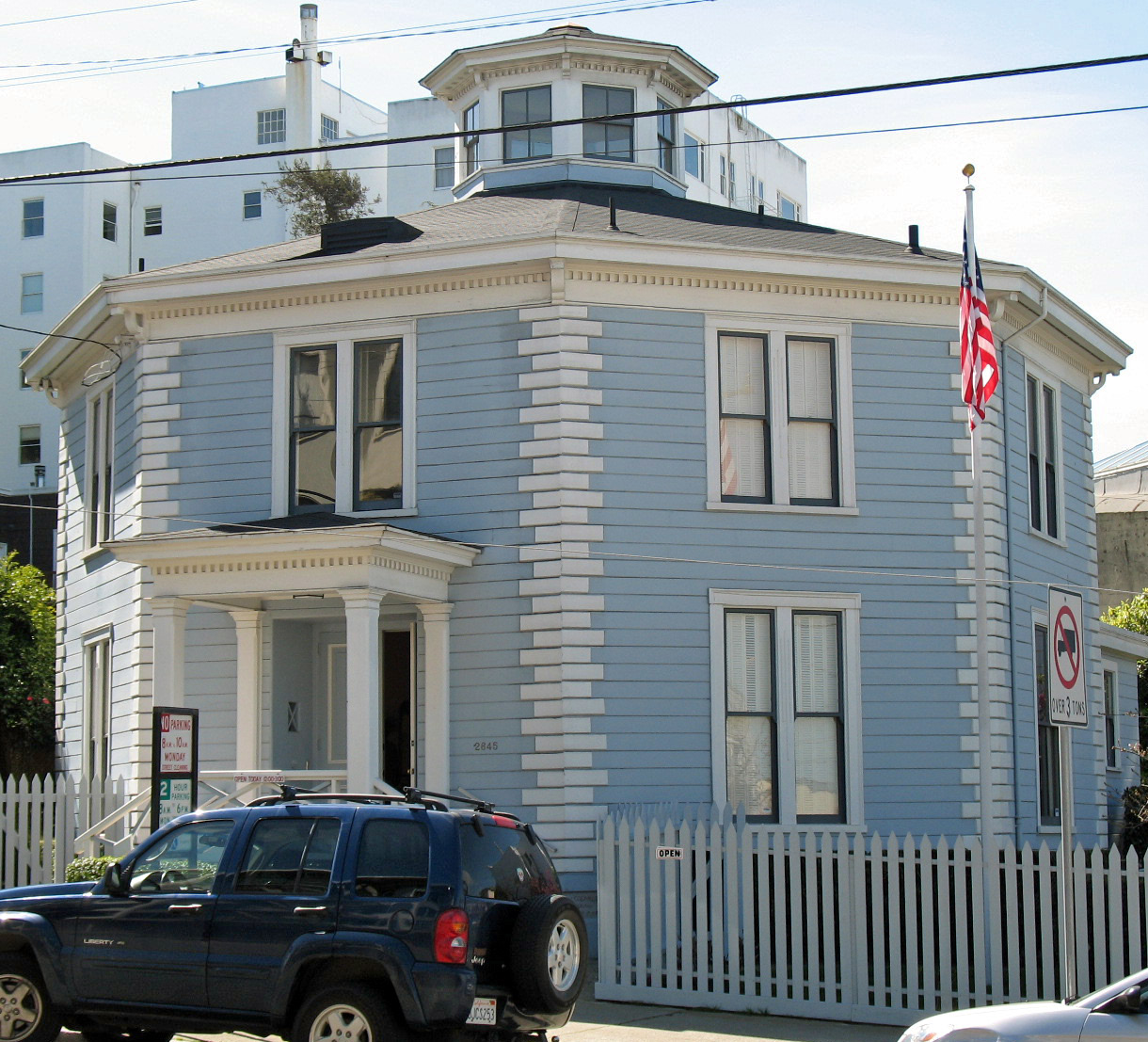
The McElroy Octagon House on Gough St. San Francisco, California; structural concrete construction (built 1861)

Octagon houses are eight-sided houses that were popular in the United States and Canada mostly in the 1850s. They are characterized by an octagonal (eight-sided) plan and often feature a flat roof and a veranda that encircles the house. Their unusual shape and appearance, quite different from the ornate pitched-roof houses typical of the period, can generally be traced to the influence of amateur architect and lifestyle pundit Orson Squire Fowler. Although there are other octagonal houses worldwide, the term octagon house usually refers to octagonal houses built in North America during this period, and up to the early 20th century.

== Orson Squire Fowler ==
The leading proponent of octagonal houses was Orson Squire Fowler. Fowler was America's foremost lecturer and writer on phrenology, the pseudoscience of defining an individual's characteristics by the contours of the skull. In the middle of the 19th century, Fowler made his mark on American architecture when he touted the advantages of octagonal homes over rectangular and square structures in his widely publicized book, The Octagon House: A Home For All, or A New, Cheap, Convenient, and Superior Mode of Building, printed in 1848. As a result of this popular and influential publication, a few thousand octagonal houses were erected in the United States, mostly in the Midwest, the East Coast and in nearby parts of Canada.

== Design principles ==
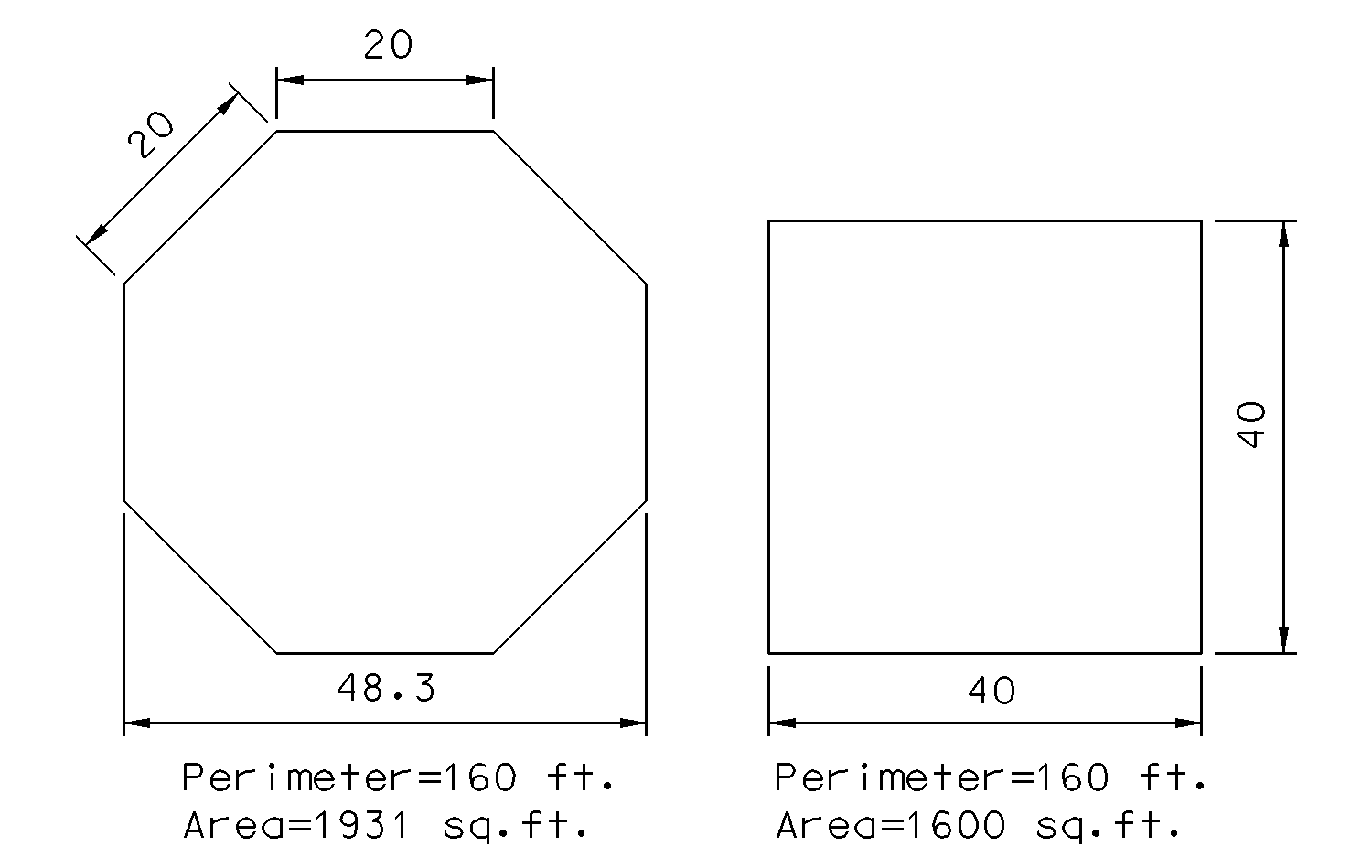
Compared with a square, an octagon encloses approximately 20% additional space with the same perimeter

According to Fowler, an octagon house was cheaper to build, allowed for additional living space, received more natural light, was easier to heat, and remained cooler in the summer. These benefits all derive from the geometry of an octagon: the shape encloses space efficiently, minimizing external surface area and consequently heat loss and gain, building costs, etc. A circle is the most efficient shape but is difficult to build and awkward to furnish, so an octagon is a sensible approximation. Victorian builders were used to building 135° corners, as in the typical bay window, and could easily adapt to an octagonal plan.

Fowler's The Octagon House is sometimes incorrectly referred to as a pattern book, but the popularity of his book lies in the way Fowler suggests some general principles and encourages readers to invent the details for themselves. Only a few examples are offered, and apart from plans, the book has only two illustrations.

Fowler first shows some methods of subdividing an octagonal floor plan. Next is Howland's octagonal plan, a small house designed by Morgan and Brothers architects. There follows A description of the author's own residence, now known as Fowler's Folly, at Fishkill, New York. Finally, A superior plan for a good sized house, which is a development of the Fishkill plans, apparently proposed by his engraver. The main feature of his plans is a desire to eliminate unnecessary circulation space, sometimes to the point that the main staircase is inconvenient, and the external veranda is the best way to get around the house.

Other design proposals include:

- a flat roof to collect rainwater, with cisterns built-in to collect and distribute the water.
- Rainwater filtering, using filter beds made up of alternating layers of sand and activated charcoal.
- Central heating by distributing hot air from a furnace in the basement.
- Flues, air ducts and speaking tubes built into the thickness of walls.

=== Masswall construction ===
Stacked board construction is recommended in the first edition of A Home for All, but the third edition, printed in 1853, has the subtitle: A Home For All, or The Gravel Wall and Octagon Mode of Building, and is distinguished by Fowler's enthusiasm for concrete construction. At the time, concrete construction was not widely used as Portland cement was only recently discovered.

Fowler knew gravel and lime were available in unlimited quantities in the prairies and advocated the use of "gravel wall" construction for the walls. This was an experimental technique at the time, forming crudely loadbearing walls without the use of rebar. Although some were built that way, most octagon houses were built the same way as ordinary houses, of timber frame, brick or stone.

== Examples ==
Estimates vary, but hundreds of these Victorian-era homes are still standing across the United States and Canada. One estimate puts the number at 2,077. Even in their heyday, octagon houses were never mainstream. The largest remaining octagon homes in the United States are Longwood in Natchez, Mississippi, and the Octagon House in Watertown, Wisconsin. In eastern Washington one still sits where it was moved to in 1993 to Bridgeport near the Columbia River.

=== Fowler's Folly ===
To quote Fowler "...those studies which have eventuated in this work were instituted primarily in order to erect this very house". Construction on his house began in 1848, the same year his book was first published, and took five years to complete. The house was large, 42 feet (13 m) to each side of the octagon or 100 feet (30 m) across, and built on a hilltop overlooking the Hudson River, where it could be seen for miles around. Fowler removed the top of the hill to create a level site and to provide material for his "gravel walls". This grand residence had four huge reception rooms which can be interconnected depending on the size of event, allegedly 60 rooms (counting small dressing rooms as well as proper rooms) and a glass-enclosed cupola rising to 70 feet (21 m) above ground. Fowler's favorite writing room was an internal room on the third floor, lit by the cupola via a fanlight over the door. The house had no central staircase, so visitors entered one of the main rooms through a small lobby, while family and staff used the basement entrance. There were verandas all round the house at first-, second- and third-floor levels, linked by two outside stairs.

The house was built using concrete. The walls were built up a few feet at a time, by pouring a mixture of gravel and lime into timber shuttering. As the concrete cured, the shuttering could be taken down and moved up to the next level. Fowler used large stones to reinforce corners, but he used no other reinforcement and was therefore restricted to walls. The roof, floors, and verandas are all of timber construction.

The financial panic of 1857 led Fowler to rent out the house, which subsequently went through a series of owners. Fowler's Folly fell into disrepair, and finally—condemned as a public hazard—it was razed in 1897.

=== Variations ===
Within the central idea of the octagonal plan, these houses show a wide variety of both construction and outward form. They range from the modest two-storey Bevis-Tucker House, to the grandiose Armour-Stiner House.

A full octagon house has eight equal sides, although slight variations in length are not unusual. In some cases the basic octagon is partially obscured by additions, either all round as at the Zelotes Holmes House, or by adding a functional wing out of sight at the rear. The House of the Seven Gables in Mayo, Florida, has gables on seven sides while the eighth side is extended to the rear. The Richard Peacon House in Key West, Florida, appears to be a full octagon from the street but the rear portion is squared off.

A moral community headed by Henry S. Clubb tried to establish Octagon City in 1856 in Kansas. It was intended to have an octagonal square with eight roads and octagonal farmhouses and barns. Most settlers had left after the winter.

=== Gallery ===
The following are examples of the 'true' octagon houses and the range of design variations to be found.

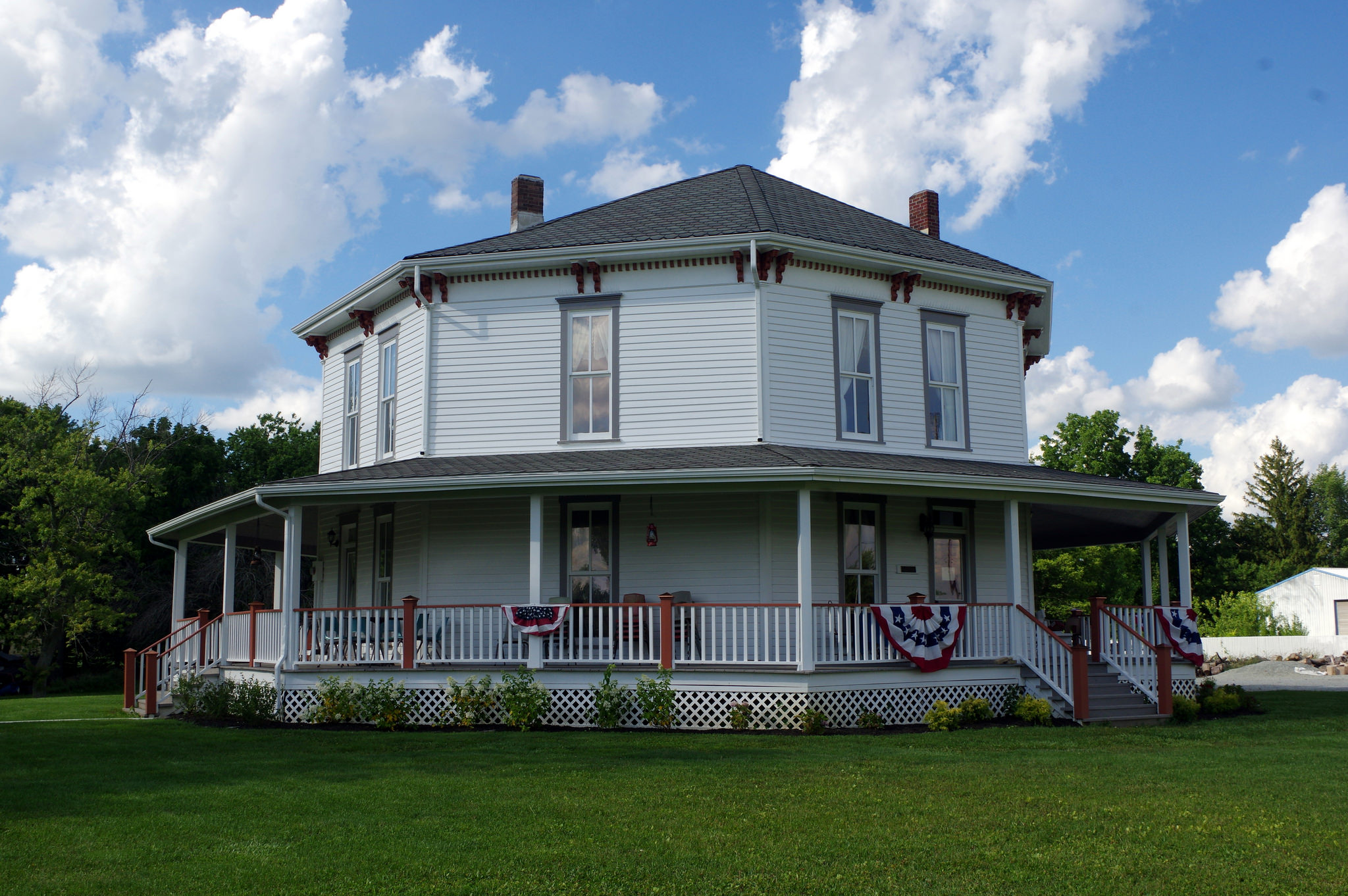
Jane Ross Reeves Octagon House in Shirley, Indiana. Built in 1879, moved and restored in 1997.

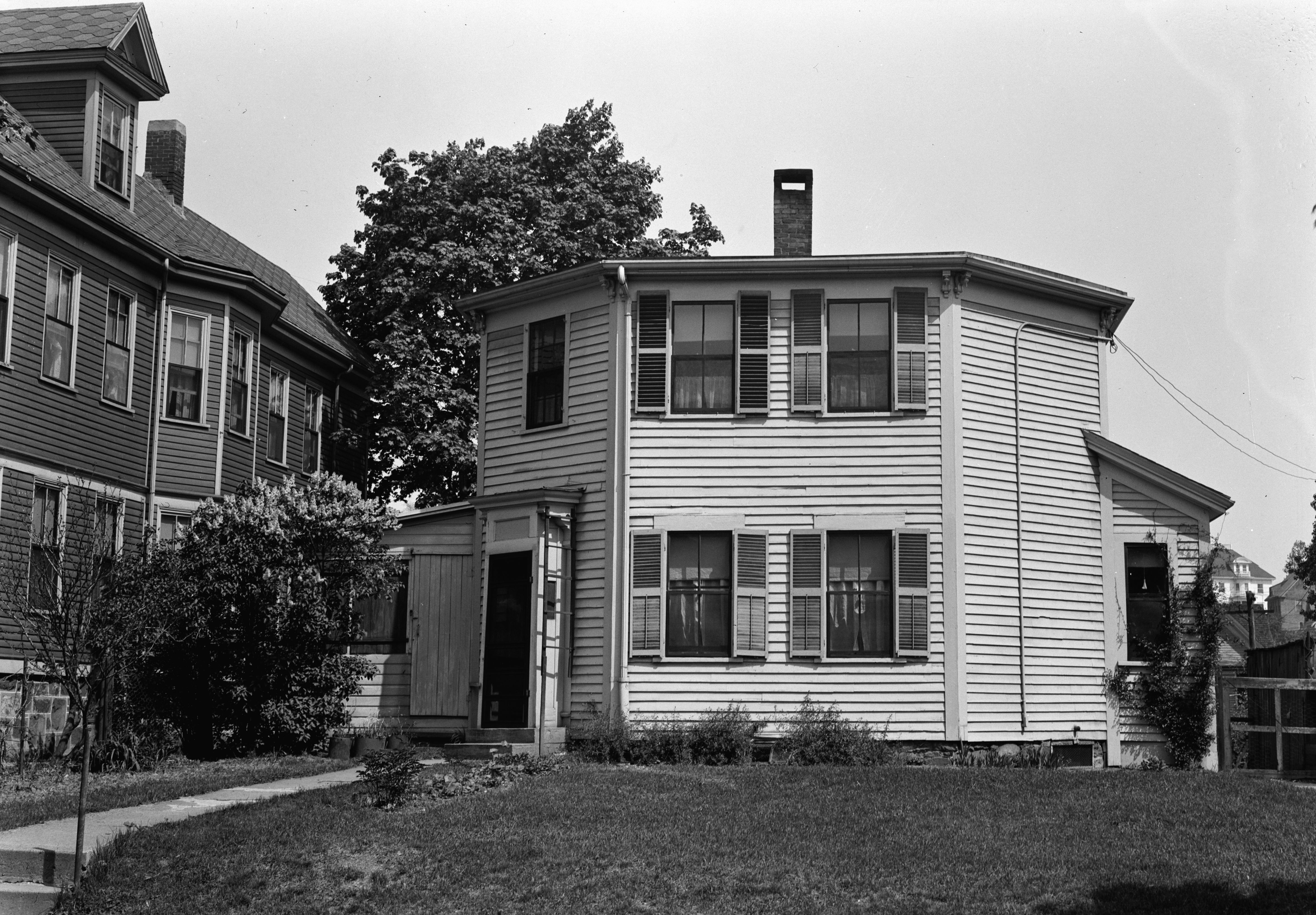
Bevis Tucker House in Chelsea, Massachusetts, a timber frame house with a flat roof.

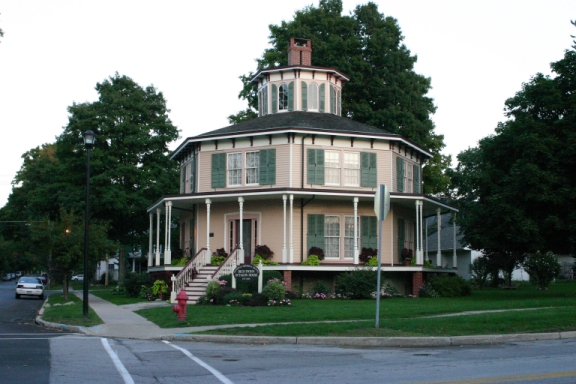
Rich-Twinn Octagon House in Akron, New York a timber frame house with pitched roof and lantern, veranda all round. Arched windows and window shutters add to the decorative effect.

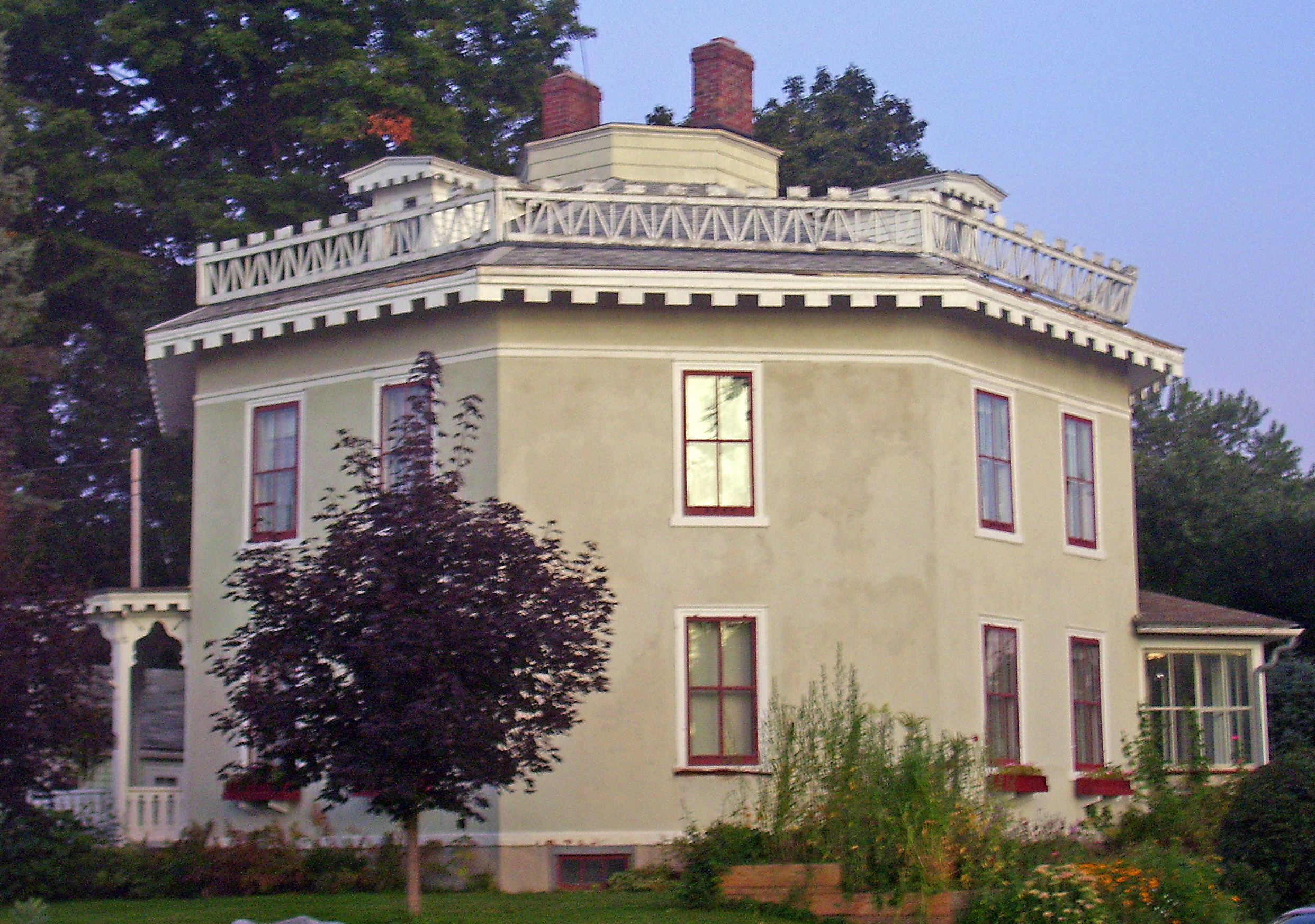
Stucco Estabrook Octagon House in Hoosick Falls, New York (built 1853-1854).

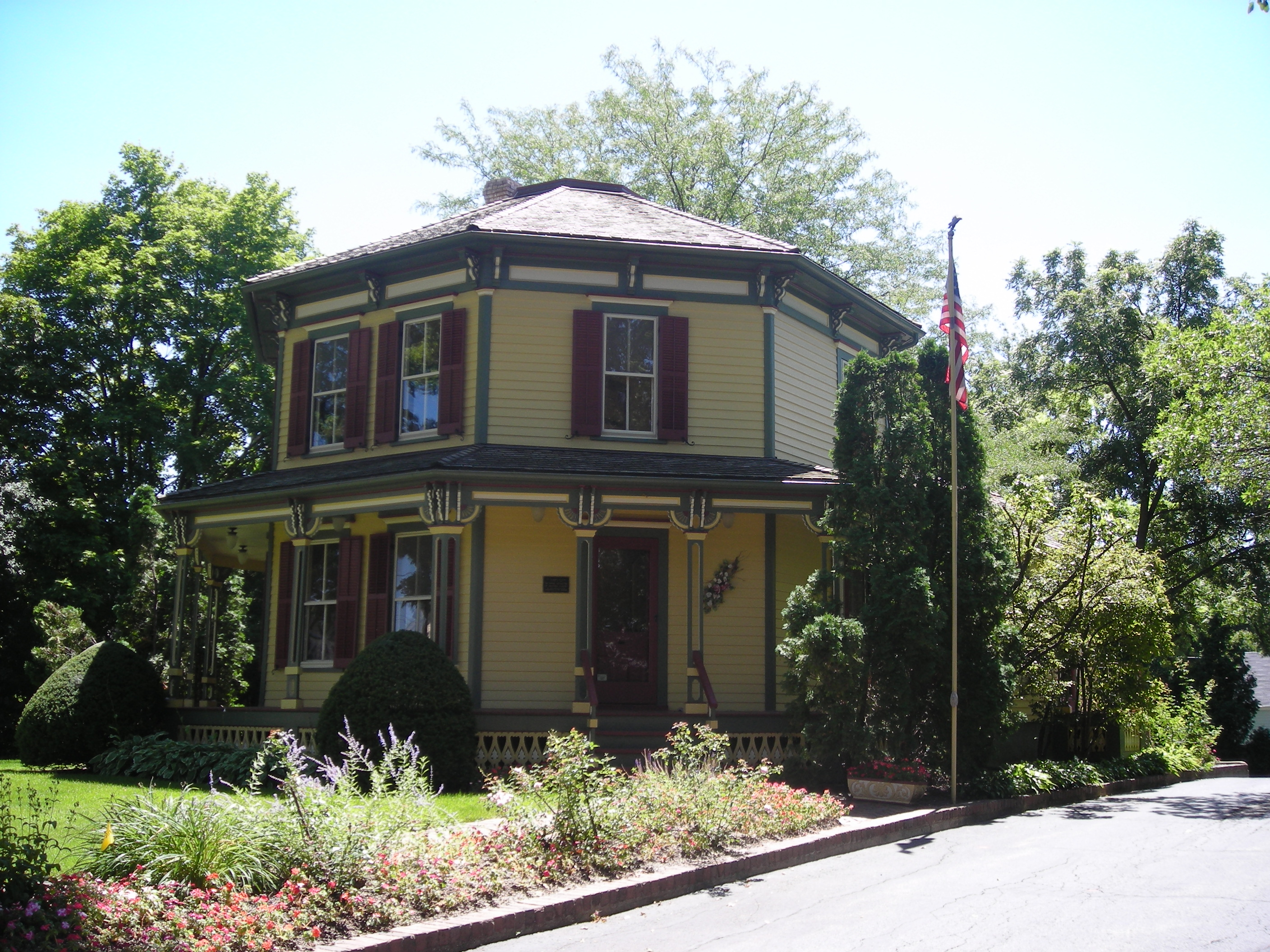
Octagon House in Barrington, Illinois (built 1860), timber frame house, seen here painted in 'heritage' colors which may reflect the original color scheme.

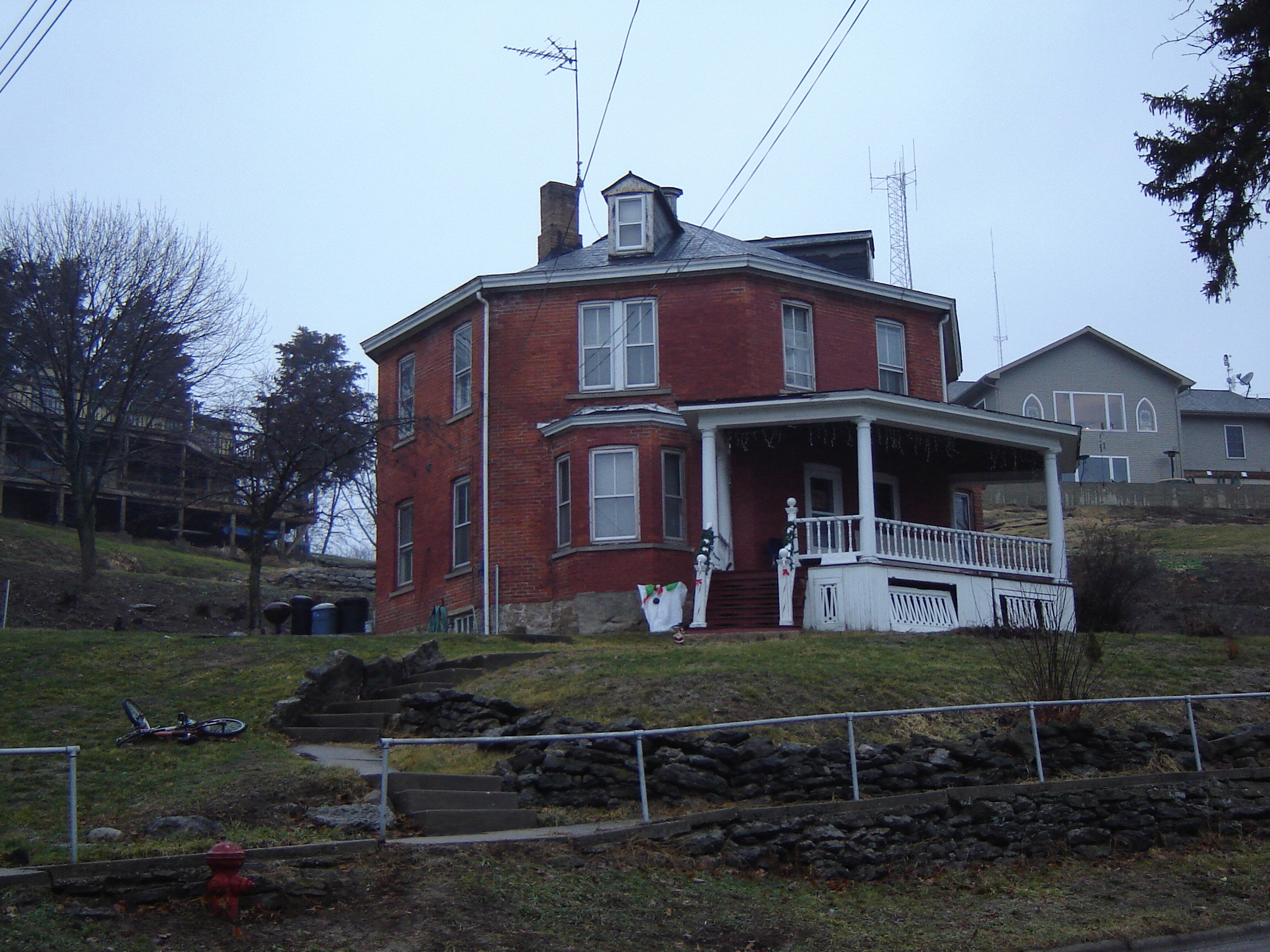
Robert Waugh House in Sparland, Illinois (built in 1886), brick house with no decorative features except a modest front veranda.

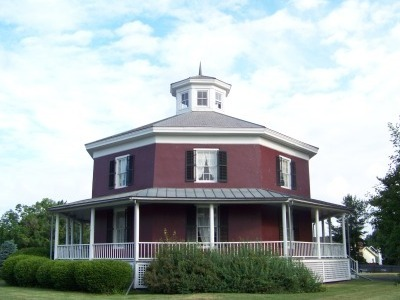
Wilcox Octagon House in Camillus, New York (built 1856), brick house with veranda, pitched roof and lantern.

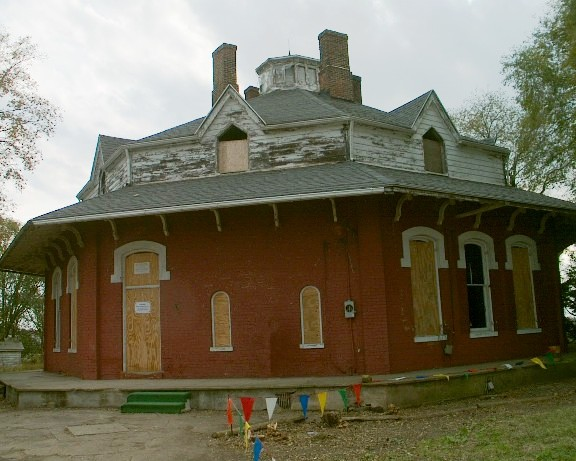
Gregg-Crites Octagon House in Circleville, Ohio (built 1855–1856), brick house with the timber frame second floor built into the roof structure.

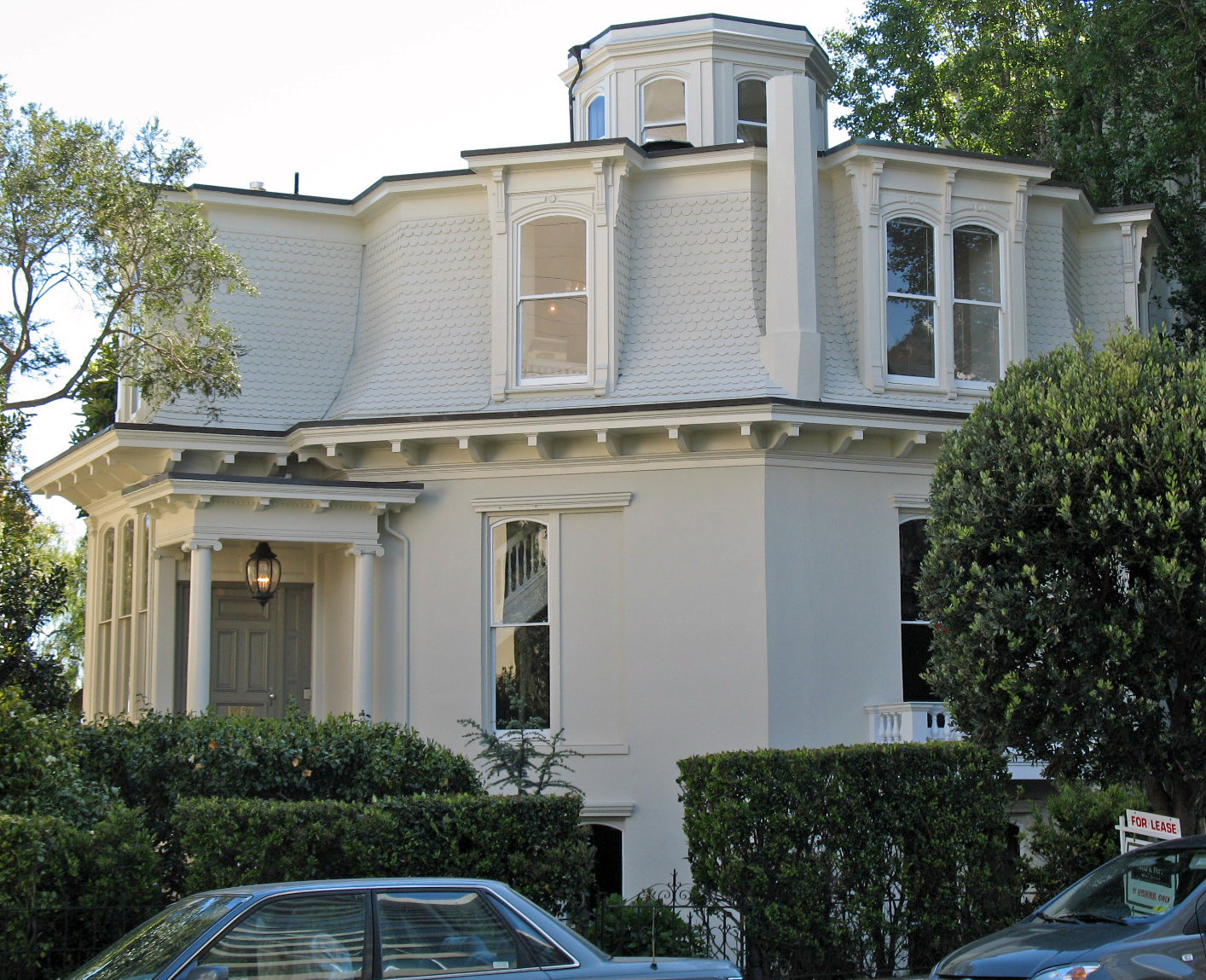
Feusier Octagon House in San Francisco, California (built 1857), using a masonry ground floor and timber frame second floor, built in a decorative style typical of San Francisco.

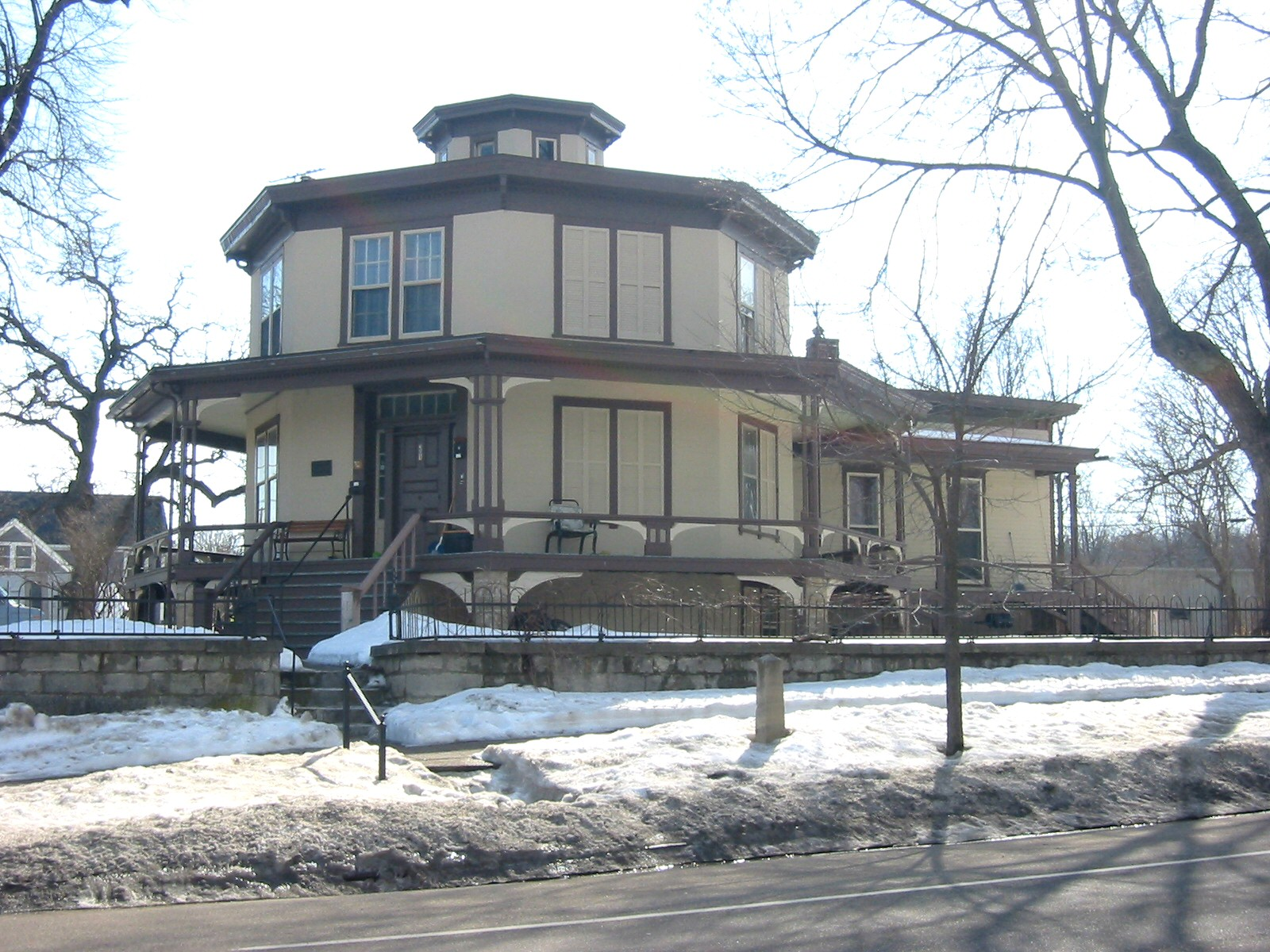
Norrish House in Hastings, Minnesota (built 1857-1858), limestone walls finished with cement render, including a veranda all around, flat roof and central lantern.

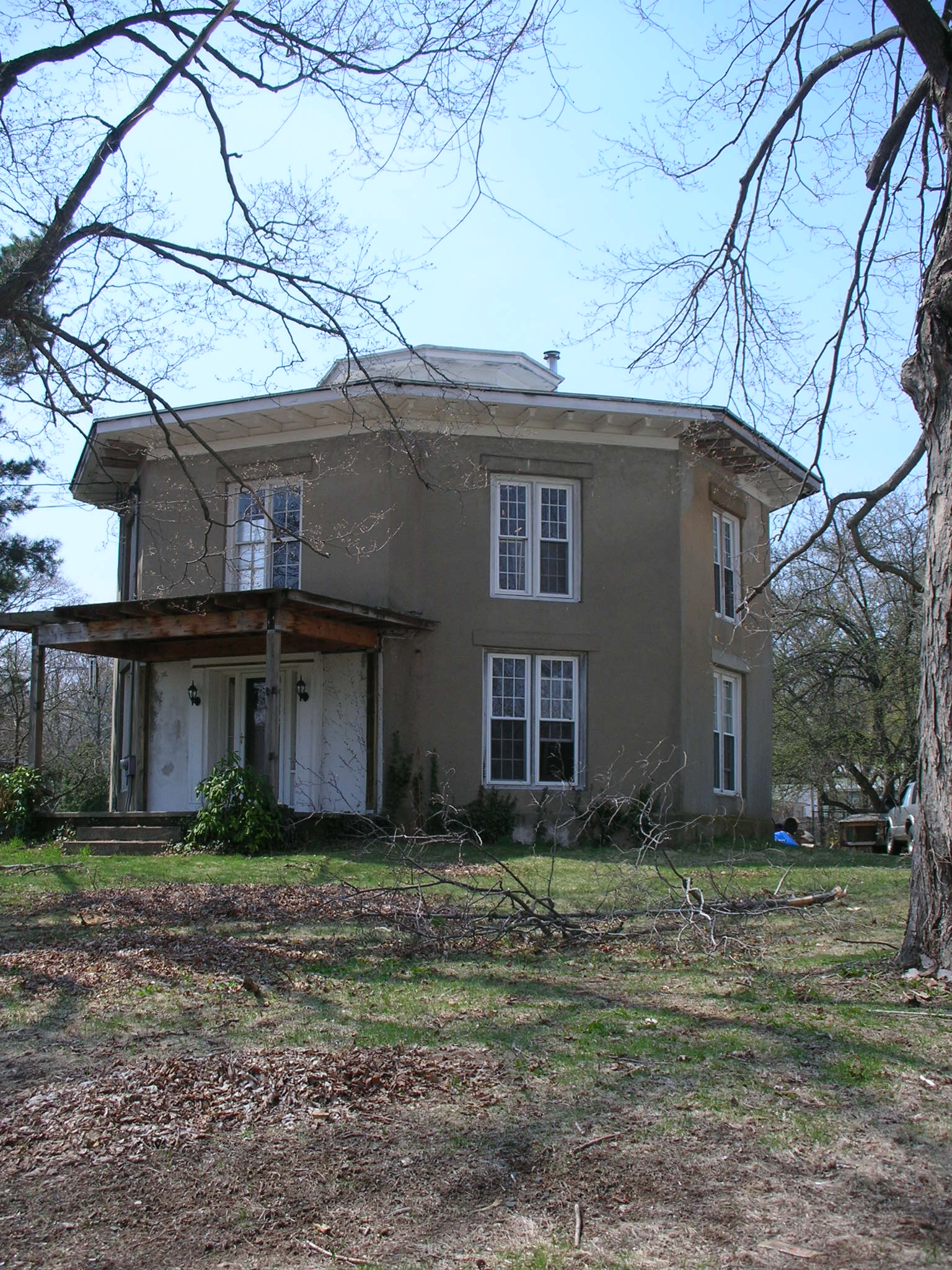
Octagon house in Wallingford, Connecticut (built 1850s), with no veranda, just a front porch.

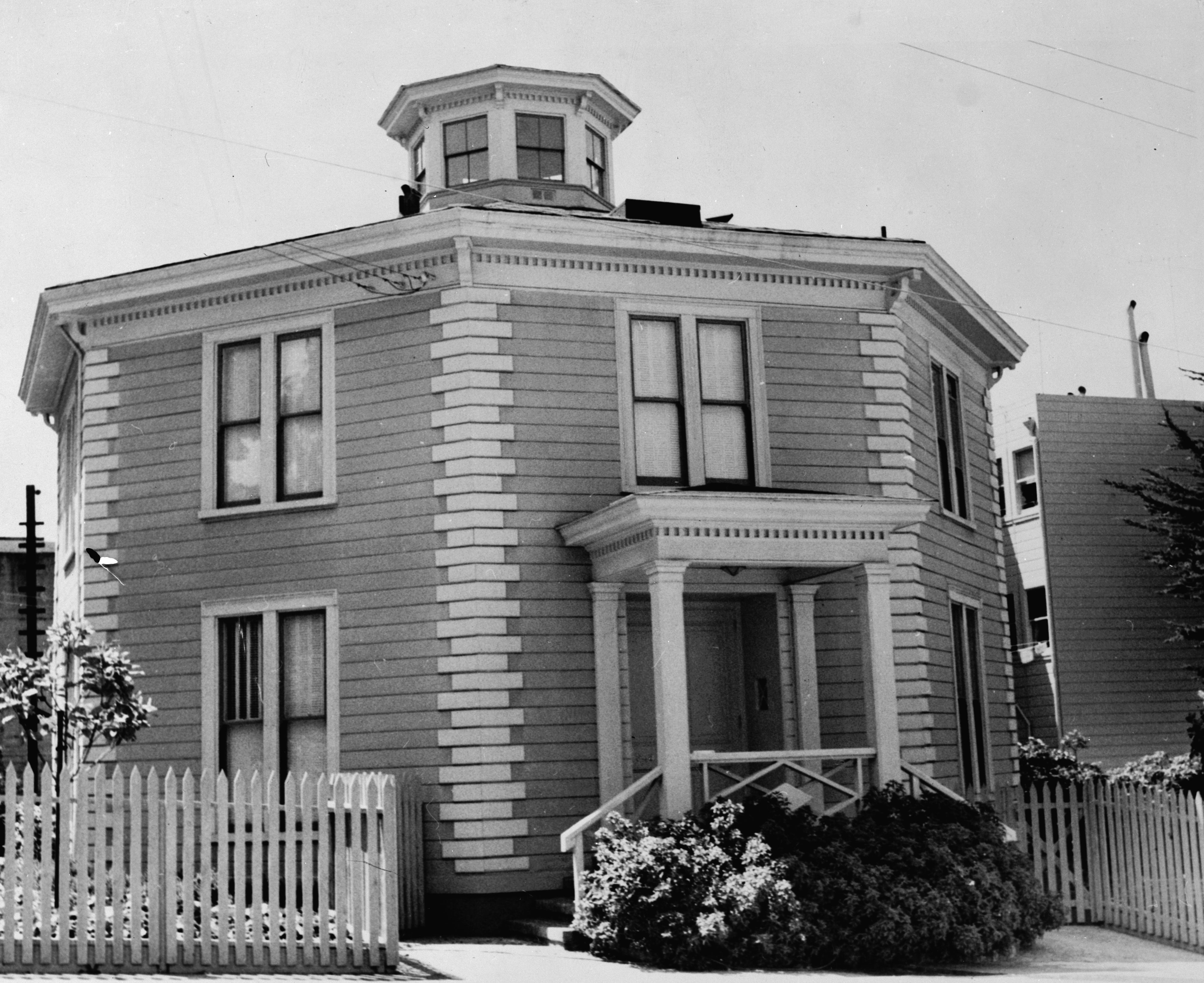
McElroy Octagon House in San Francisco (built 1861), concrete house with "gravel wall" construction. The cement render is scored to look like masonry.

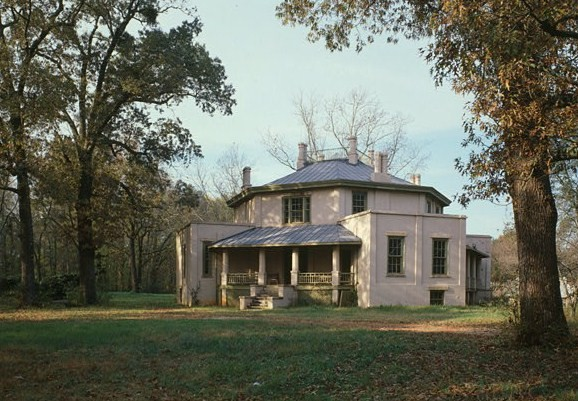
Zelotes Holmes Housein Laurens, South Carolina (built 1859), concrete construction. A variation on the pure octagon plan, with square wings extending on four sides.

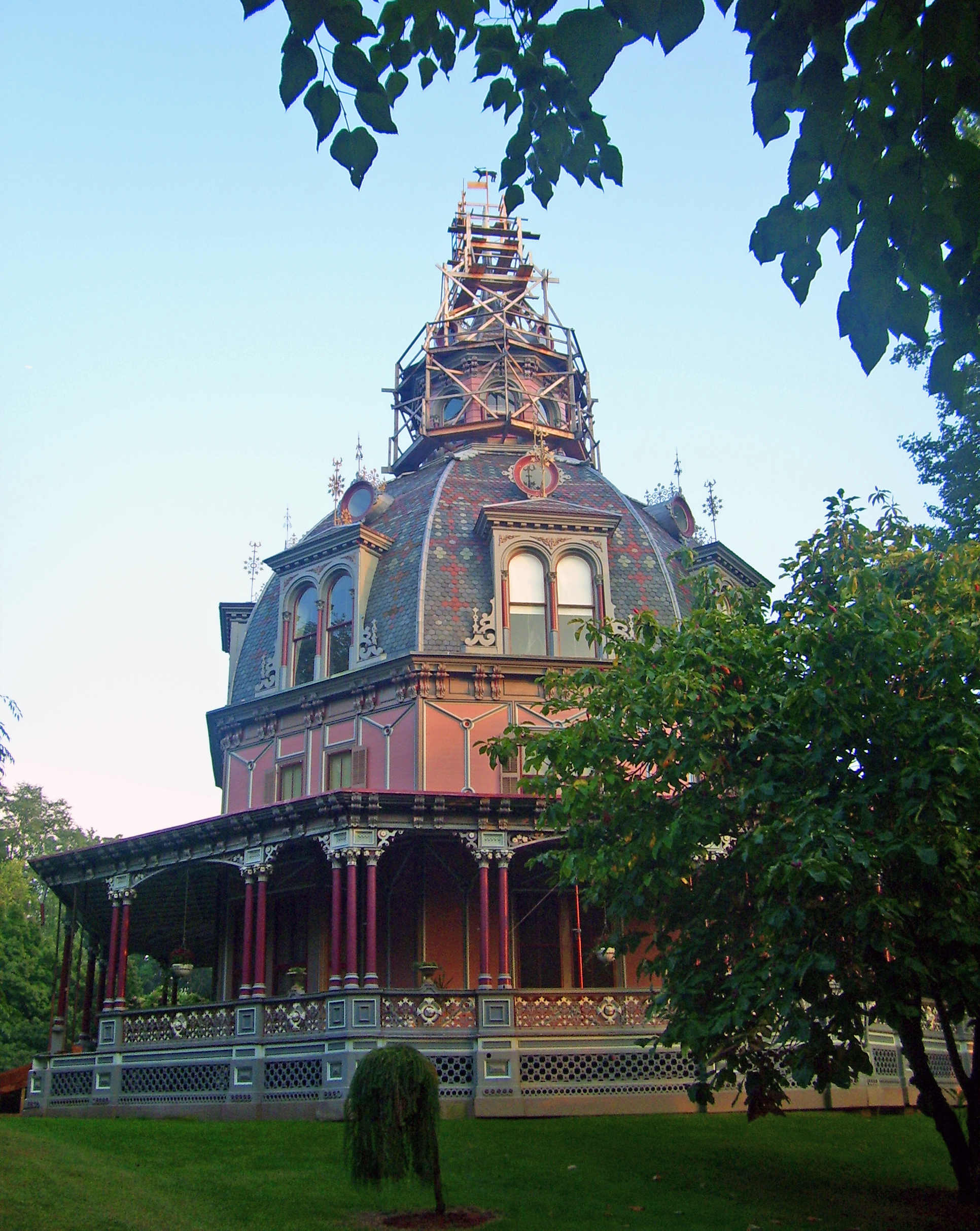
Armour–Stiner House in Irvington, New York(built in 1860), with ornate decoration.

=== Watertown Octagon House ===
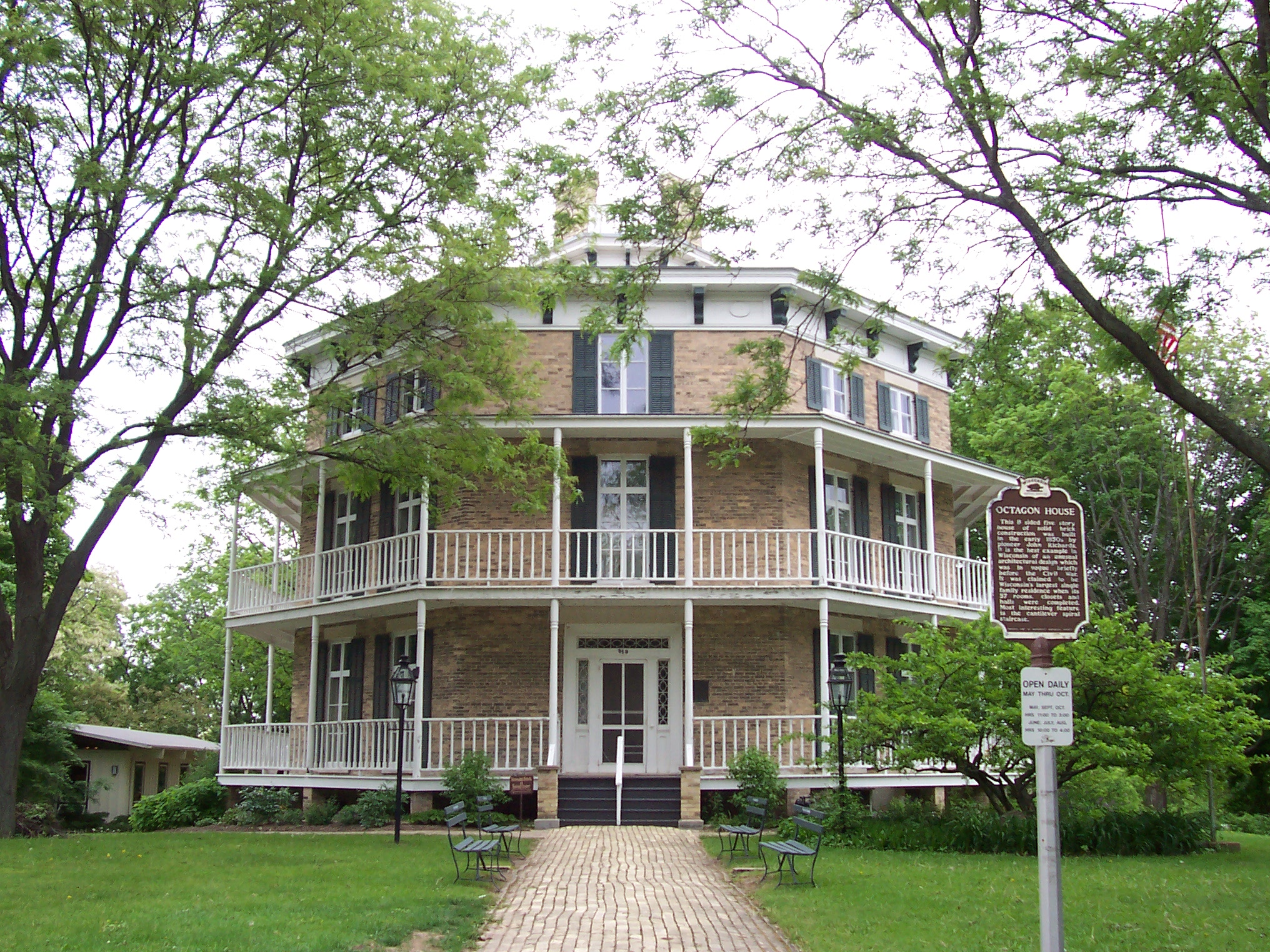
The Octagon House in Jefferson County, Watertown, WI (built c. 1854), photographed in 2007

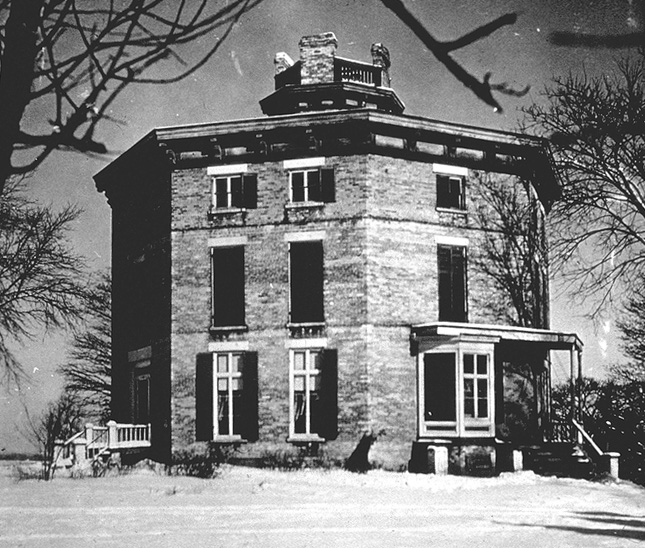
Photograph, date unknown. When record drawings were made, the house was dilapidated with the verandas missing: only an entrance porch can be seen here. The verandas were reinstated in 1973.

Although one of the largest, the Watertown house is midway between the grandest and most modest surviving examples. It is well documented, has been carefully restored, and is open to the public as a museum. Construction was completed 1854.

==== Construction and innovations ====
- The plan is a 50-foot (15 m) octagon, with a 4-foot-8-inch (1.42 m) veranda all round at first- and second-floor levels.
- The house is built on 17-inch-thick (430 mm) stone foundations, with external walls of brickwork 13 inches (330 mm) thick.
- The central square is made up of two 4-inch (100 mm) leaves of brickwork with a 4-inch (100 mm) cavity, which is used for chimney flues and warm air ducting, to heat rooms without fireplaces. The double wall eliminates the need for projecting chimney breasts.
- The battlement effect at the top of the cupola is actually the four chimneys.
- A furnace in the basement heats water, and warm air is ducted into the twelve main rooms, i.e. those adjoining the central square.
- An elegant spiral staircase links all the floors. It is self-supporting on the inside and built into the walls on the outside of the stairwell. There is also a servants' staircase.
- The house has a flat roof, sloping gently towards the center.
- Rainwater from the roof was collected in a reservoir at third-floor level, and overflows into a cistern next to the kitchen in the basement.
- Publications regularly state the house has 57 rooms; however this includes every closet and passage. The number of habitable rooms is 29, including the octagonal room in the cupola.
- Despite having 15 bedrooms there is just a single bathroom.

==== Architectural style ====
The house was inspired by Fowler's book, and is a good example of his theories put into practice. Features which are directly linked to his ideas, apart from the octagonal plan, are the central spiral staircase, symmetrical arrangement of rooms with interconnecting doors, the verandas running all round the building, and the flat roof surmounted by a cupola. In accordance with Fowler's theories, the detailing is relatively plain for the period. Openings are simply framed by moldings. The covered verandas lack excess detail, having modest turned balustrade spindles and supporting posts. The decorative effect of the house comes from the basic design features: the octagonal shape and the external verandas.

There are four generously sized rooms on each floor, nearly 18 foot square, with connecting doors all round. The subsidiary rooms are less satisfactory, being triangular. The arrangement of rooms is rigidly the same on all floors because the partition walls are of 9-inch (230 mm) brickwork, so they must stack one above the other. The central spiral stair is compact, but leaves one side of the house without direct access to the landings, so there are bedrooms only accessible through another bedroom - in the worst case, through two other bedrooms. Fowler's own house had external staircases and the verandas were used for circulation and access to the rooms.

==== Record drawings ====
Below are drawings of the Watertown Octagon House dated March 28, 1935, prepared by the Historic American Buildings Survey. At that time the verandas were missing, removed when they became dangerously rotten. The survey drawings are a reconstruction of the house as it was originally built.

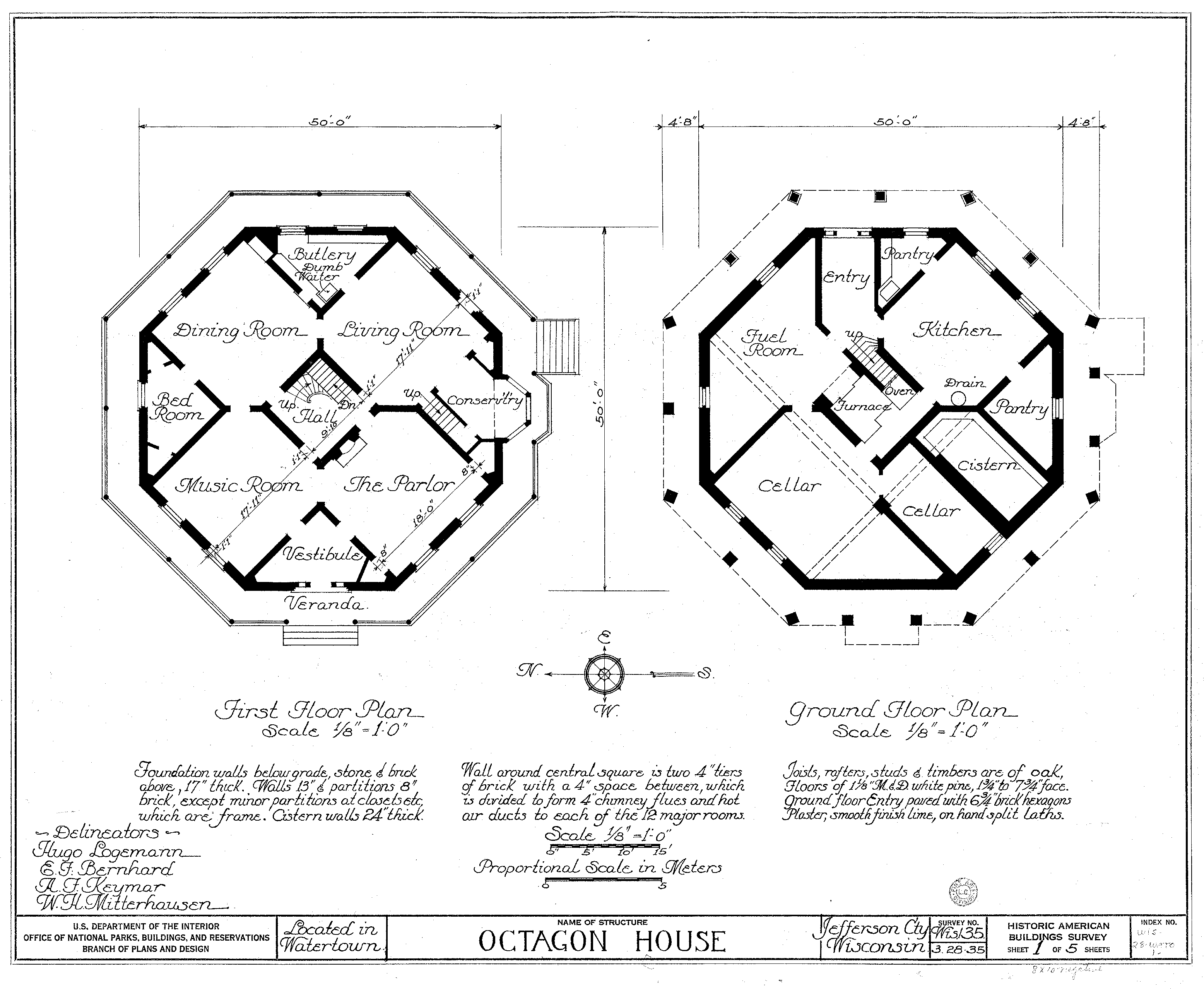
Ground floor (basement) and first floor plans.

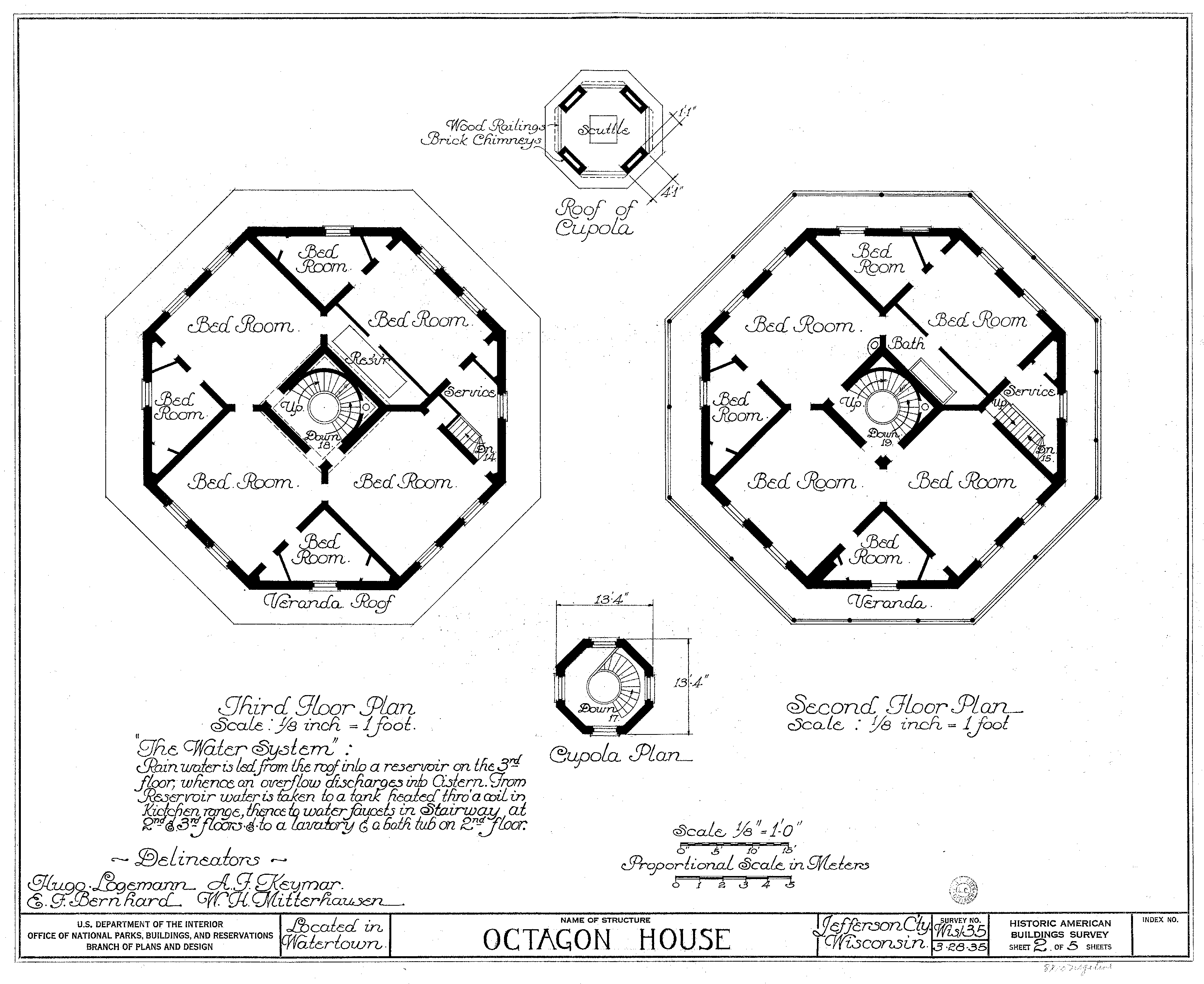
Second and third floor plans.

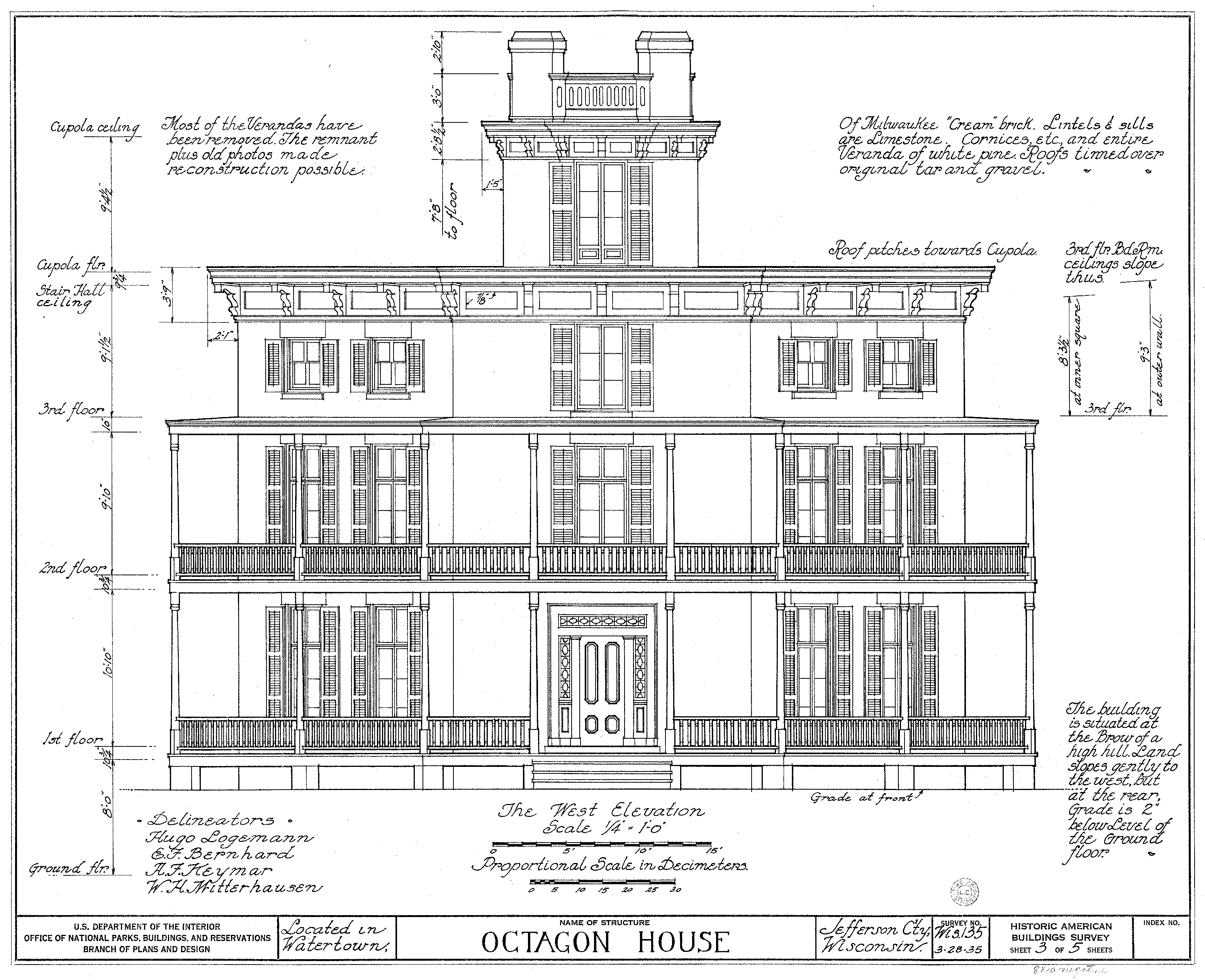
Front elevation.

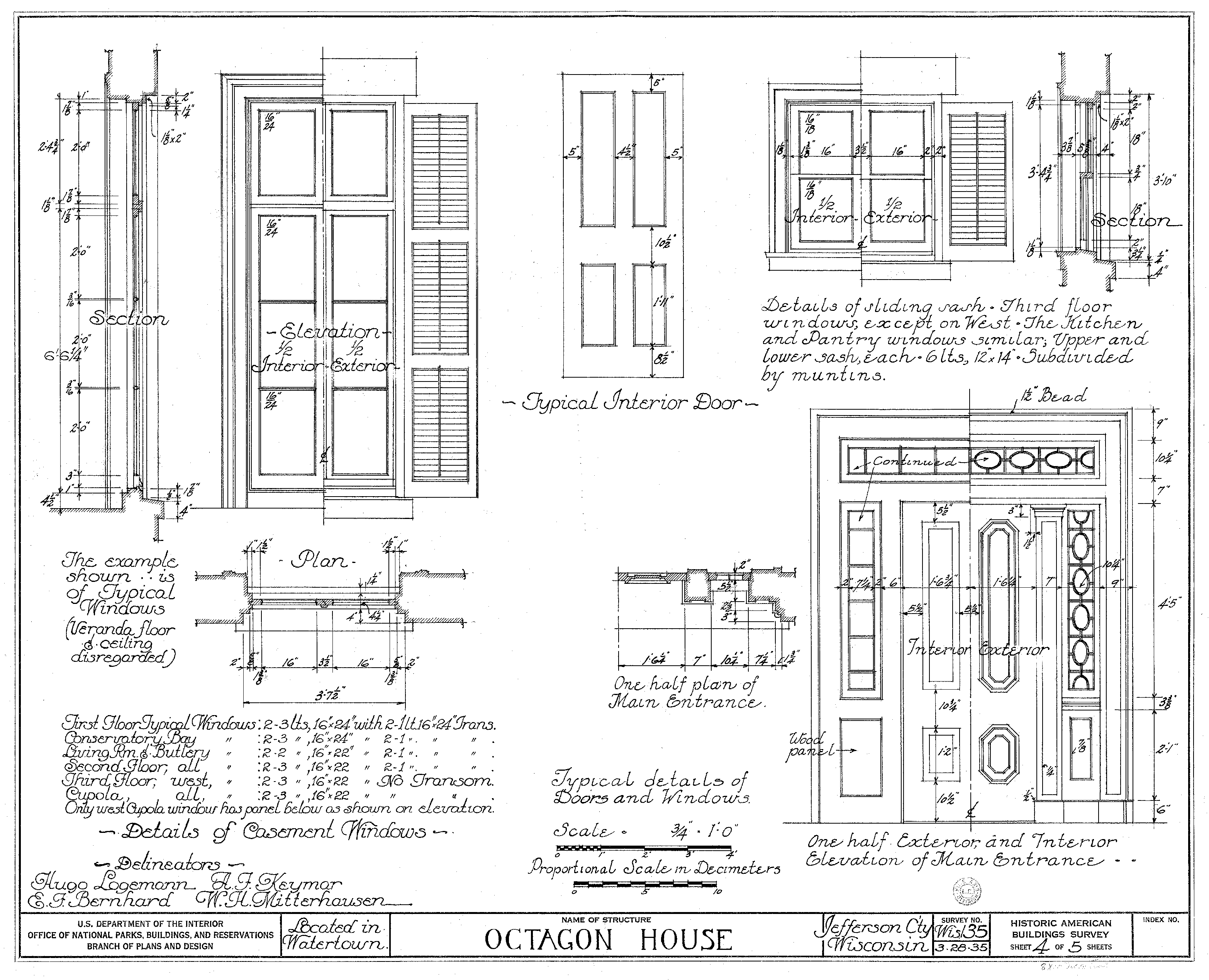
Exterior details: front door and windows.

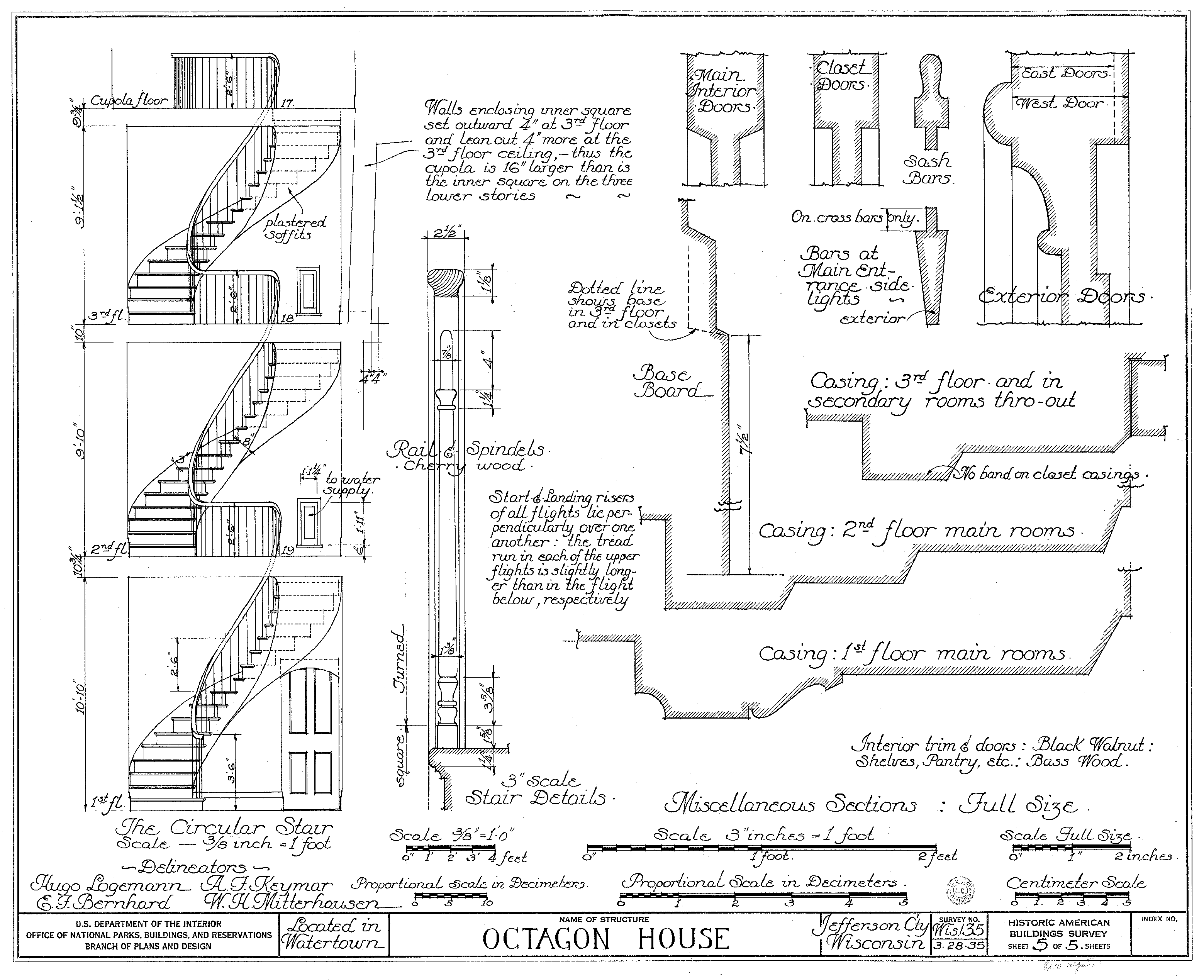
Interior details: the main spiral staircase, door casings and base boards.

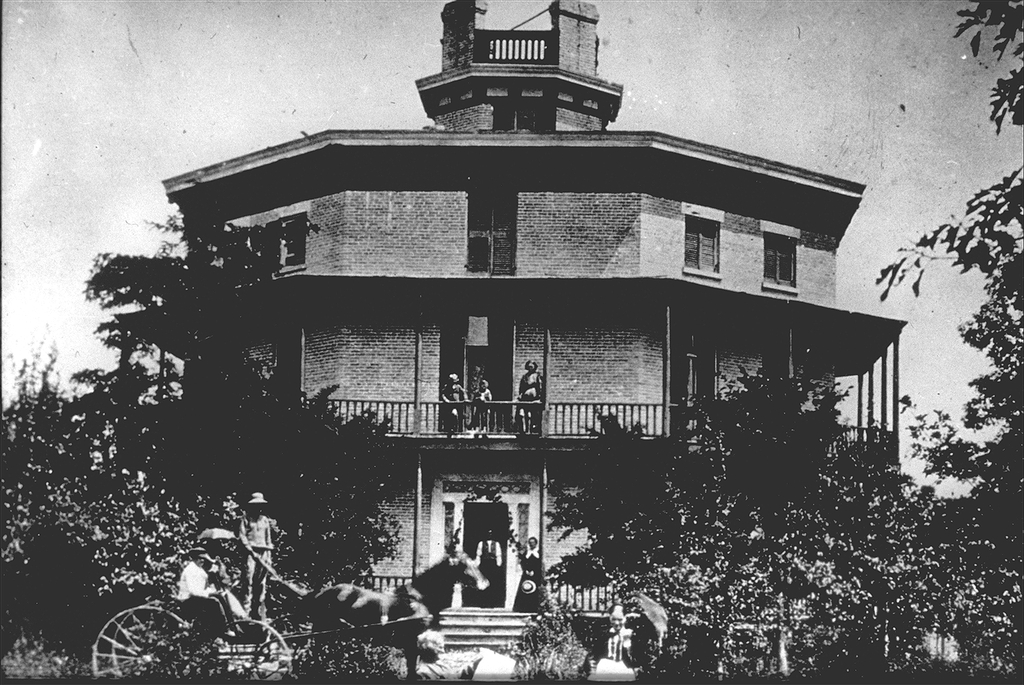
Photograph, possibly as early as 1856, showing the house in its original state.

== Other octagonal buildings ==
Worldwide, there are many other octagonal structures that are not associated with Fowler: houses, barns, schoolhouses, churches, and in Canada, octagonal "dead houses". Some early examples include:

- Poplar Forest, Thomas Jefferson's private retreat and plantation house near Lynchburg, Virginia.
- William Thornton's John Tayloe III House, more commonly called The Octagon House in Washington, D.C. After the White House was burned by the British during the War of 1812, President James Madison stayed in the Octagon House, and it was here that the Treaty of Ghent (ending the War of 1812) was signed. It is now the headquarters of the American Institute of Architects. While known as "The Octagon", it is worth noting that this particular building is not actually octagonal.

== See also ==
- List of octagon houses
- List of octagonal buildings and structures
