= River Street Historic District =

River Street Historic District can be one of three listed on the U.S. National Register of Historic Places

- River Street Historic District (New Haven, Connecticut), part of the Fair Haven section of that city
- River Street Historic District (Troy, New York), now part of the Central Troy Historic District
  - Northern River Street Historic District, another Troy neighborhood
- River Street Historic District (Wilkes-Barre, Pennsylvania).
