= McCarthy Building (Troy, New York) =

- U.S. National Register of Historic Places
- U.S. Historic district – Contributing property
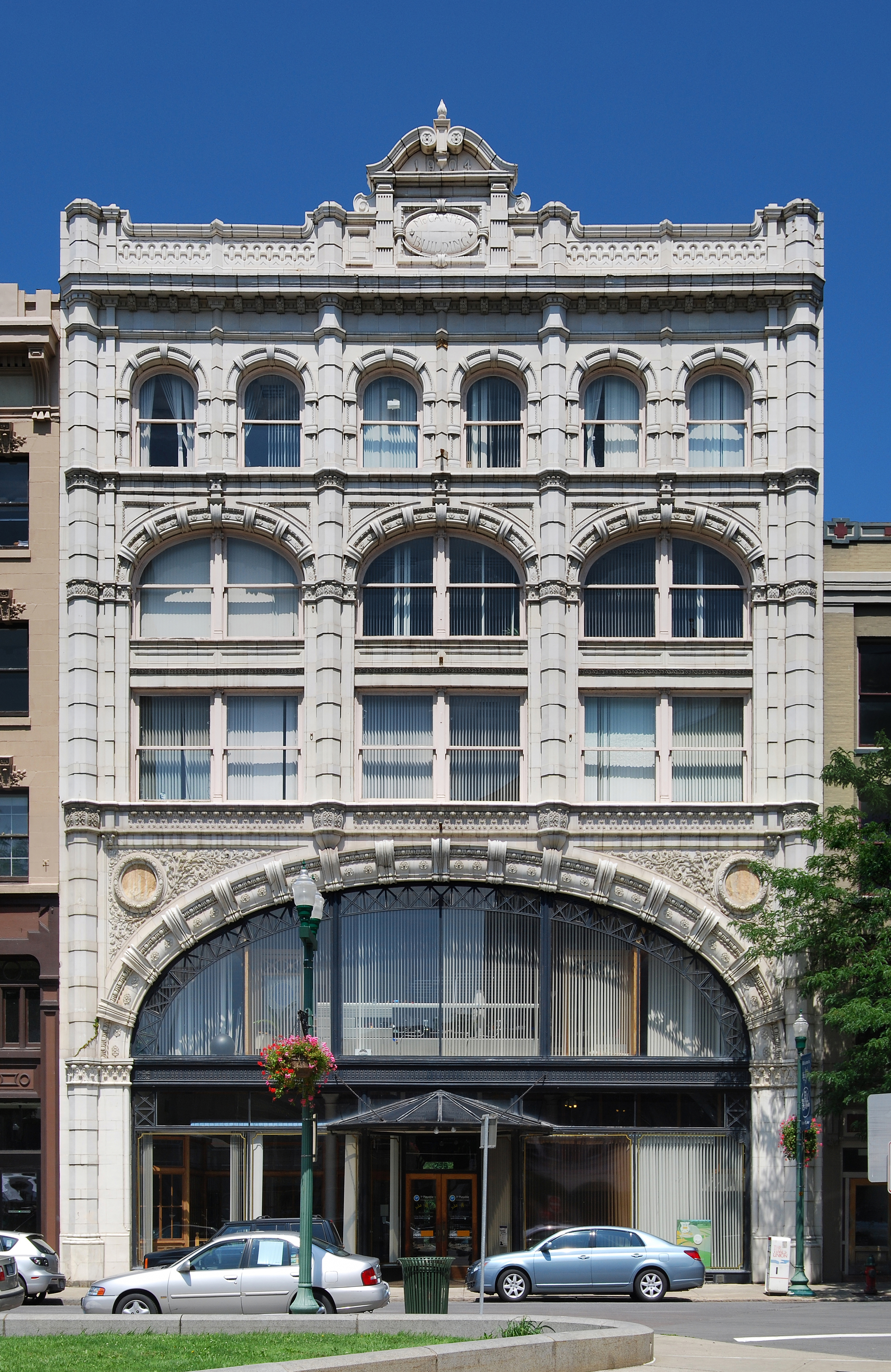
- Front (east) elevation, 2008
- Location: Troy, NY
- Coordinates: 42°43′54″N 73°41′30″W
- Built: 1904
- Architect: Charles Boland
- Part of: Central Troy Historic District (ID86001527)
- NRHP reference No.: 70000430
- Added to NRHP: 1970

The McCarthy Building is located on River Street on the west side of Monument Square in Troy, New York, United States. It was built in 1904 by Peter McCarthy, president of Troy Waste Manufacturing Co., and remains in use as a commercial building. In 1970 it was added to the National Register of Historic Places in 1970, along with the nearby Cannon Building. Since 1986 it has also been a contributing property to the Central Troy Historic District.

It is five stories tall and three bays wide. The eastern (front) facade is done in terra cotta with details in iron and glass. The latter two materials are combined to create the building's most distinctive feature, the proscenium-style arched window across the bottom two stories.

The building was constructed in 1904 during an early 20th-century building boom in downtown Troy. It originally housed the R.C. Reynolds home furnishing store. The store's grand opening on September 16, 1904 was attended by a crowd of thousands. An article in the Troy Times praised the building calling it "one of the most attractive show buildings in the city". It was almost demolished during urban renewal efforts in the late 1960s, but protests from residents and its listing on the Register helped to save it. In the 2000s, it became home to Light & Power Communications Ltd., a Capital District media company. In 2020, the McCarthy Building was converted to luxury apartments.
