= Congregation Berith Sholom =

Reform synagogue in Troy, New York, US

- Location in New York

Religion
- Affiliation: Reform Judaism
- Ecclesiastical or organizational status: Synagogue
- Leadership: Rabbi Debora S. Gordon
- Status: Active

Location
- Location: 167 Third Street, Troy, Rensselaer County, New York 12180
- Country: United States
- Interactive map of Congregation Berith Sholom
- Coordinates: 42°43′34″N 73°41′30″W

Architecture
- Architect: Marcus Cummings (attrib.)
- Type: Synagogue
- Style: Romanesque Revival; Italianate
- Established: 1866 (as a congregation)
- Completed: 1870

Website
- berithsholom.org

Congregation Berith Sholom (transliterated from Hebrew as "Covenant of Peace") is a Reform Jewish synagogue located at 167 Third Street, in Troy, Rensselaer County, New York, in the United States.

The synagogue is the oldest continuously used synagogue in the state of New York, the second oldest house of worship in the state outside of the city of New York, and one of the oldest synagogue buildings in the United States.

== History ==
The congregation was formally founded in 1866 by members of two other congregations, and its name was originally spelled Baris Sholem. The building, which is still in use, was built in the summer of 1870, and finished in time for the High Holy Days. Reform ritual was adopted around 1890 and the congregation joined the Union of American Hebrew Congregations in 1920. Rabbi Jacob S. Raisin served as rabbi from 1912 to 1915. Around 1953 an addition was built to house the religious school. The building is part of the Central Troy Historic District.

The design of the Romanesque Revival and Italianate synagogue building is attributed to Marcus Cummings.
