= Soldiers and Sailors Monument (Troy, New York) =

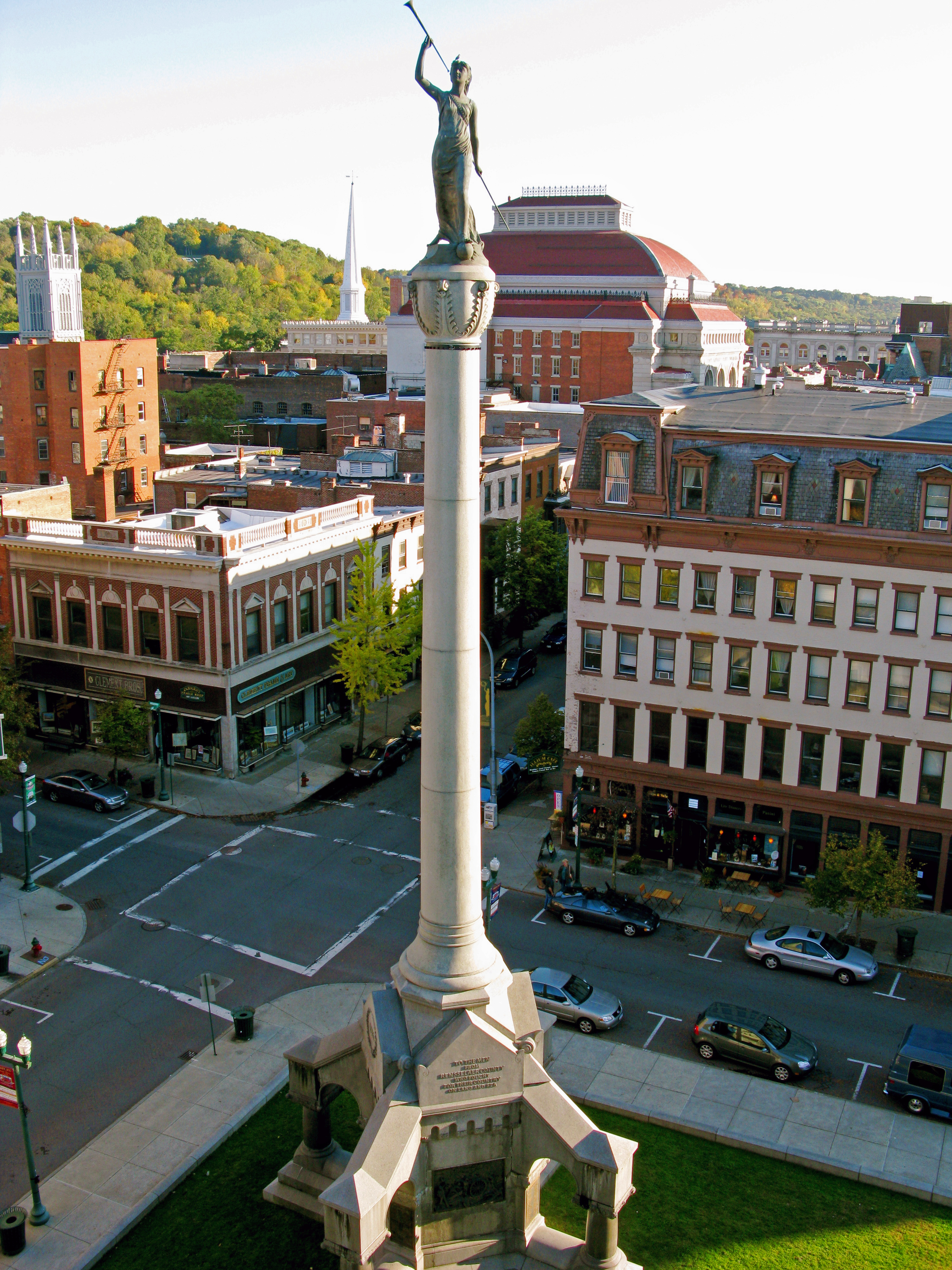
- Location: Central Troy Historic District, Monument Square, Broadway & 2nd Street
- Coordinates: 42°43′53.83″N 73°41′30″W
- Designer: Fuller & Wheeler
- Height: 93 ft (28 m)
- Beginning date: May 30, 1890
- Dedicated date: September 15, 1891

The Soldiers and Sailors Monument is a war monument in Monument Square, at Broadway and 2nd Street in Troy, New York, United States. It honors those from Rensselaer County who served in the Revolutionary War, the War of 1812 and the American Civil War.

The monument is a contributing object in Central Troy Historic District.

== Description ==
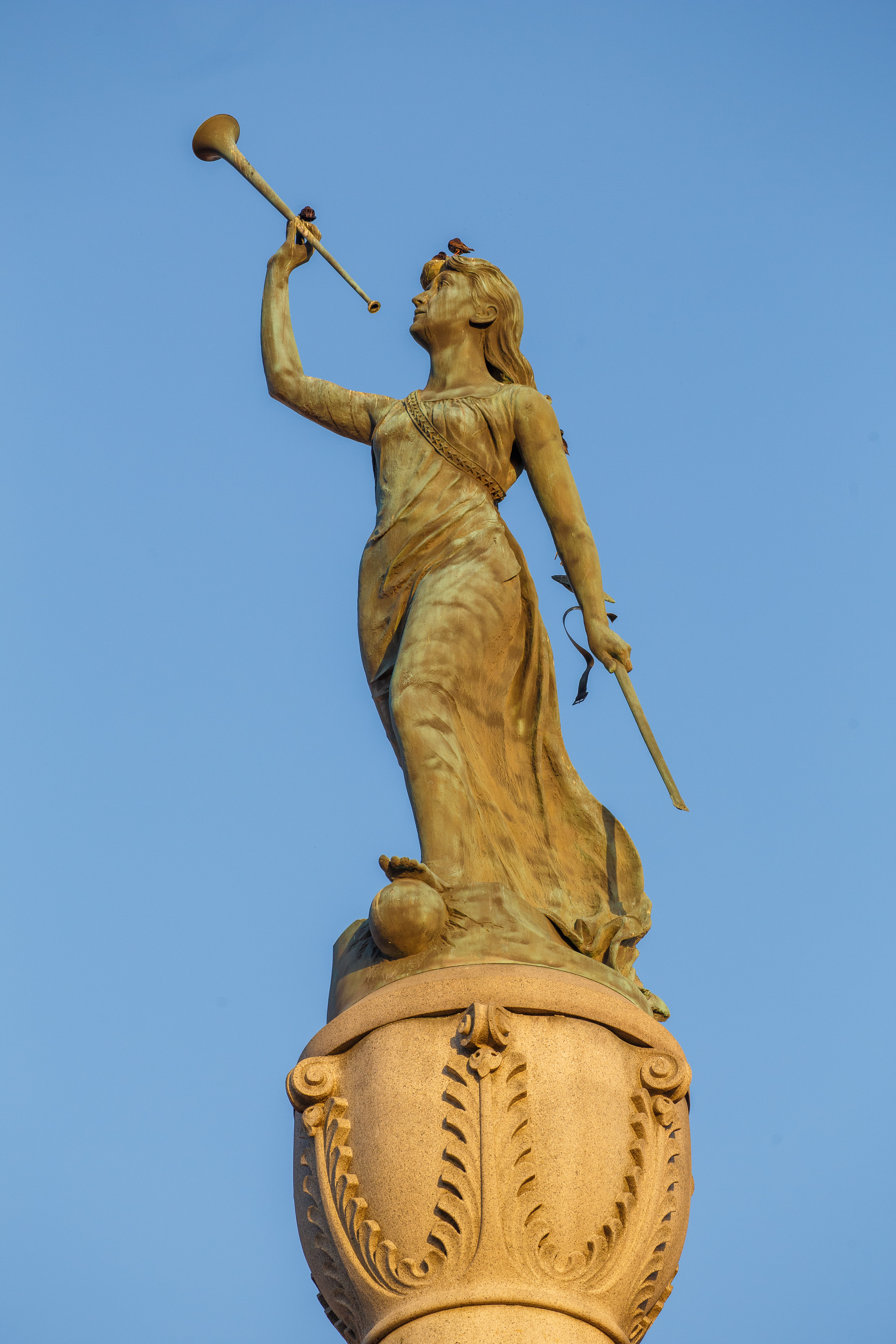
The Call to Arms.

The monument features a 50-foot granite column crowned by The Call to Arms, a 17-foot bronze statue of the Goddess Columbia. She stands facing north, with her foot on a cannon ball, a sword in one hand and a trumpet in the other.

The granite base is designed in a vigorous Neo-Grec style. Architectural elements such as scrolls, acroterions and guttae are recognizable, but abstracted. Instead of traditional piers, four buttresses form attached arches that are supported by compressed Byzantine columns. Four slightly-projecting gables support the great column. Three are adorned with a carved laurel wreath encircling a date – "1776," "1812," "1861-65" – and the fourth features the monument's dedication: "To the Men from Rensselaer County who fought for Their Country on Land and Sea."

Bronze relief panels on the base depict battle scenes of the Infantry, Cavalry and Artillery. The Navy is represented by a sea battle between ironclad warships – The Monitor and The Merrimack. This has a local connection, the iron plates that covered the USS Monitor were forged in Troy. Bronze plaques list the names of major battles from each war.

The monument was designed by the architectural firm of Fuller & Wheeler (1883–1897) of Albany, New York. The stone was quarried and fabricated by Frederick & Field of Quincy, Massachusetts. The bronze figure of Columbia was modeled by James E. Kelly, and the bronze relief panels were modeled by Caspar Buberl. The sculpture was cast by the Henri-Bonnard Bronze Company of New York City.

The monument was rededicated in September 1991.

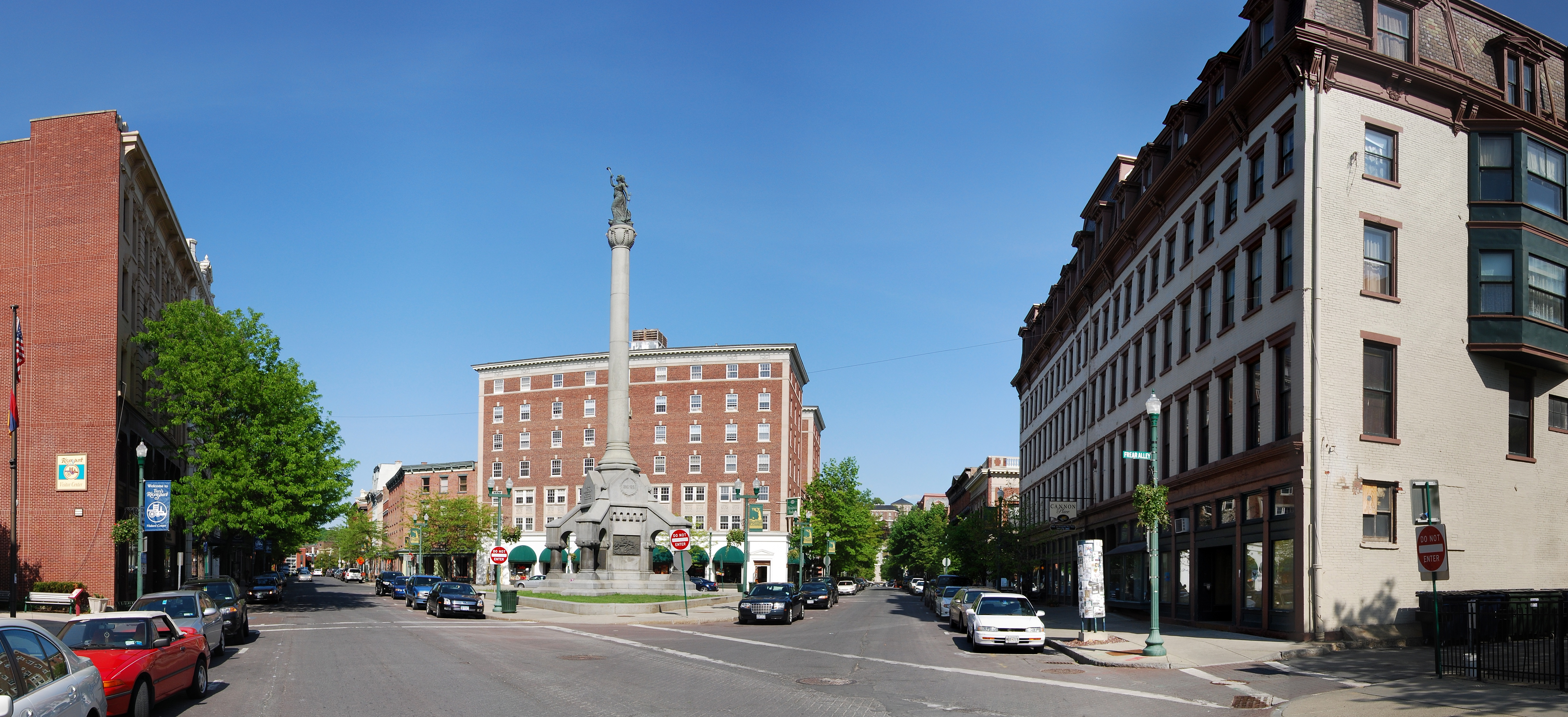
Panorama of Monument Square.
