= Troy Public Library =

Library

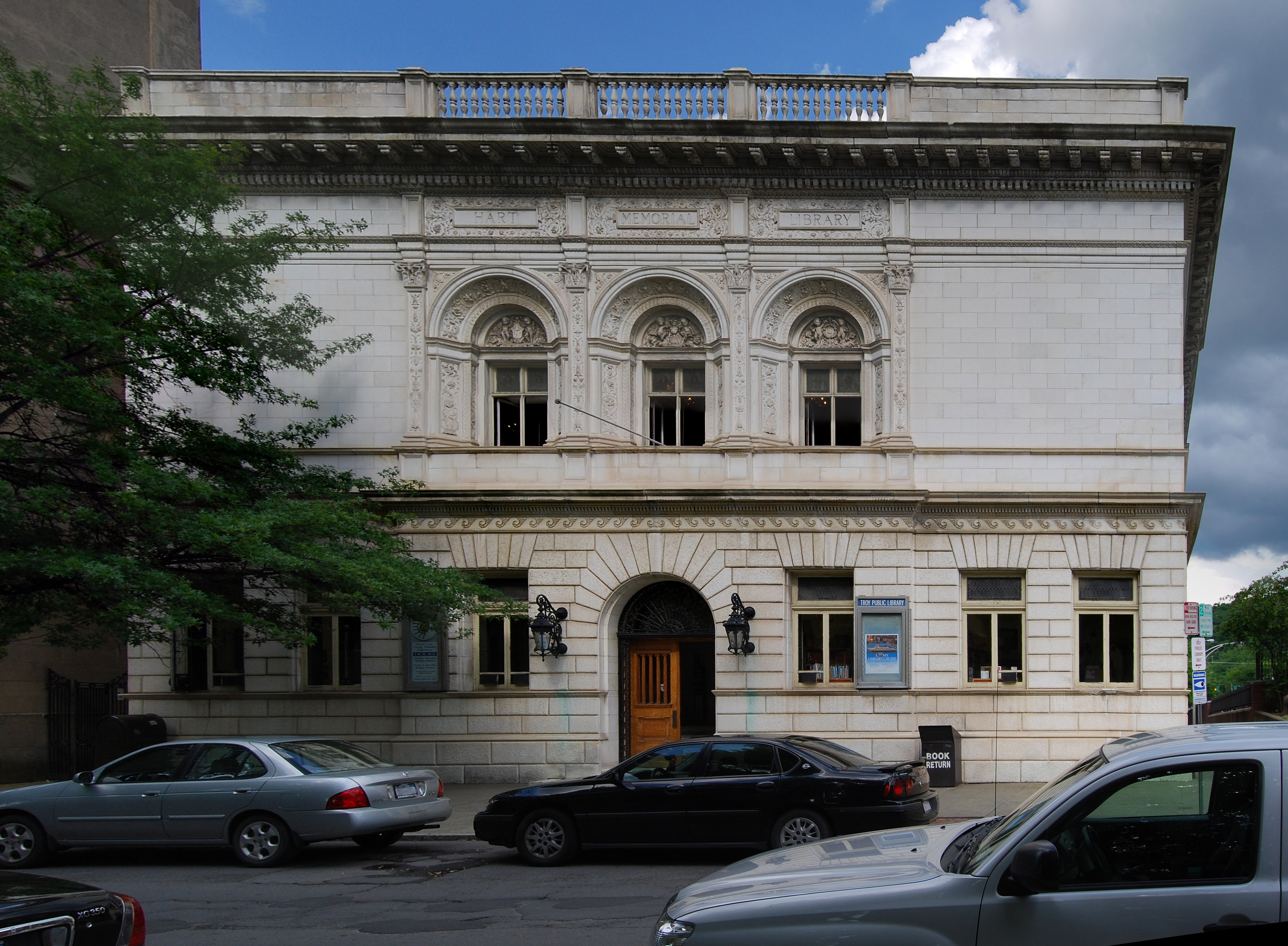
- 42°43′40.5″N 73°41′31.1″W
- Location: 100 Second Street, Troy, New York 12180
- Established: 1799-1800
- Branches: 3

Other information
- Budget: $800,000
- Website: http://www.thetroylibrary.org
- Troy Public Library
- U.S. National Register of Historic Places
- U.S. Historic district – Contributing property
- Location within New York Location within the United States
- Location: 100 2nd St., Troy, New York
- Coordinates: 42°43′40.5″N 73°41′31.1″W
- Area: less than one acre
- Built: 1896
- Architectural style: Italian Renaissance
- NRHP reference No.: 73001258
- Added to NRHP: January 17, 1973

The Troy Public library is the main public library building in the city of Troy, New York, and is located across the street from Russell Sage College in downtown Troy. Currently, the library has one other location, the Lansingburgh Branch, located at 27 114th Street in Troy. The Sycaway branch was closed in January 2009 but has been closed permanently since 2011. The first library began in 1799.

== History ==
The current building was completed in 1897 and is listed on the National Register of Historic Places, both in its own right and as a contributing property to the Central Troy Historic District.

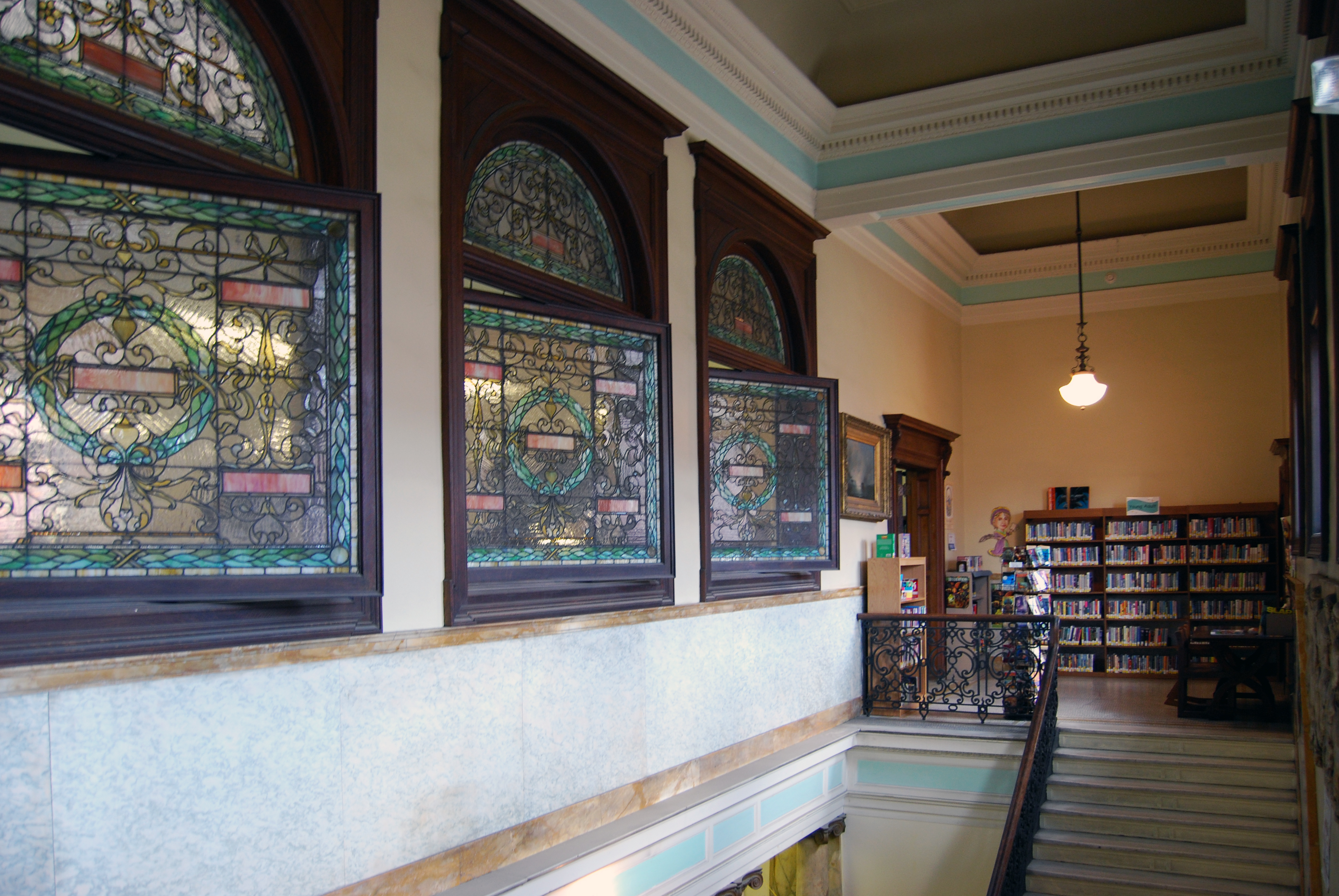
Interior of the library

It is one of the oldest cultural institutions in Troy and was established by the Young Men’s Association. Funds to construct the downtown library, the Hart Memorial Building, were donated by Mary E. Hart to honor her late husband, William Howard Hart. Designed by the New York City architectural firm of Barney and Chapman, the library is an example of the American Renaissance style, which had evolved with the success of the 1893 World's Columbian Exposition in Chicago. Other examples of the style include the Villard Houses (1886), The Low Library at Columbia University (1894) and the Boston Public Library The official opening of the Lansingburgh branch of the Troy Public Library was on November 22, 1980. The Hart Memorial Building was occupied by the Troy Public Library and was constructed in 1896-97 and was at the time, “one of the finest examples of Italian Renaissance.” On January 26, 1946, Dr. Ray Palmer Baker(Dean of Rensselaer Polytechnic Institute at the time) was elected president of the board of directors of Troy’s Public Library at an annual meeting. January 29, 1946, books that were added totaled 1,869 and over 1,000 books withdrawn because they were either outdated or worn out. There were around 75,446 volumes in the library at this time. On February 26, 1946, Henry Christman ran a Rensselaer County Historical Society meeting where he discussed the “Anti-rent Movement in Rensselaer County. At around 1953, the Troy Public Library received approximately $50,000 per year from the city of Troy which was stated to be a municipal budget. The library received a grant in 1959 from the City of Troy in order to fulfil operating costs. On December 6th, 1980, the library representatives requested a $40,000 increase for the operating costs but it remained at $160,000 for the year. On December 9th, 1980, the Troy Public Library was at risk of closing due to unfulfilled funding requests to maintain the Library and its services for the community. For many years prior to 1980, the Lansingburgh branch of the Troy Public Library was housed at an old academy building at 144th street and 4th ave. The building was owned by the Lansingburgh School District. It was soon sold to the City. The library's operating expenses began increasing through 1971 at 15 cent per cent a year with the same influx of income. Under these conditions the Library was at risk of closing.(1887).

== Exterior Description ==
Rendering of the Library, 1894

The exterior west and south walls of the Troy Public Library are constructed of white Vermont marble. The walls are rusticated on the first story, and are contrasted with dressed stones, Ashler Masonry, on the upper story. The facades are articulated carved stone courses, water table, and cornice. The ornament surrounding the three windows on the Second Street side are highly detailed. The Ferry Street side of the building is a five bay loggia at the second story level. This building is topped by a stone parapet, with a balustrade over the entrance. The building was described in the 1972, as "one of the finest examples of Italian Renaissance style in this country". The building also boasts a tiffany glass window depicting the Venetian scholar and printer Aldus Manutius.
