= Jacob S. Raisin =

Belarusian-born Jewish-American rabbi

Jacob Salmon Raisin (October 19, 1878 – January 11, 1946) was a Belarusian-born Jewish-American who served as rabbi in Charleston, South Carolina for nearly 30 years.

== Life ==
Raisin was born on October 19, 1878, in Nesvizh, Russia, the son of Rabbi Aaron Shlomo Raisin and Taube Slutsky. He was the descendant of a long line of rabbis and communal workers, including Rabbi Solomon Zalman of Mir and Koenigsberg, Rabbi Meir Katzenellenbogen of Padua, and Rashi. His brother was Rabbi Max Raisin.

Raisin immigrated to America in 1892. He studied at the College of the City of New York from 1894 to 1897, and in 1900 he graduated from the University of Cincinnati and was ordained a rabbi by Hebrew Union College. He also received a D.D. from Hebrew Union College in 1913, a Ph.D. from the University of Denver in 1911, and an LL.B. from Albany Law School in 1915. In 1900, he was elected rabbi of Temple Gemiluth Chessed in Port Gibson, Mississippi. By 1903, he wrote "Life and Work of George Eliot" in Hebrew, "Beginning of the Renaissance among Russian Jews," "A Glimpse into Jewish Science," and "The Maskilim in America."

In 1905, Raisin was elected rabbi of Congregation B'nai Israel in Butte, Montana. In 1907, he became rabbi of Congregation Montefiore in Las Vegas, New Mexico. He resigned from the Congregation in 1911 and moved to Brooklyn, New York to be with his mother, who was in poor health. In 1912, he was named rabbi of Congregation Berith Sholom in Troy, New York. In 1915, he became rabbi of Kahal Kadosh Beth Elohim (KKBE) in Charleston, South Carolina. There, he became a local leader in educational and civic affairs and for the Jewish community. After retiring from KKBE, he was awarded the title of "Rabbi Emeritus" of the congregation in 1944. He was selected to serve as a delegate to the Southern Congress for a League of Nations in 1919. A lecturer for the board of education, he served as commissioner of education from 1924 to 1928 and was again appointed to the position in 1940. He was also chairman of the Charleston Community Chest, a member of the Board of Trustees of the Charleston County School District, a local member of the National Recovery Administration and the Federal Housing Committee. He wrote Twice-Told Talmud Tales in 1928 and articles for The Jewish Encyclopedia, the Hebrew encyclopedia Otzar Yisrael, and The Universal Jewish Encyclopedia.

Raisin wrote Sect, Creed and Custom in Judaism in 1907, The Haskalah Movement in Russia in 1913, and Centennial Booklet Commemorating the Introduction of Reform Judaism in America in 1925. Gentile Reactions to Jewish Ideals was posthumously published in 1953. He served as state field representative of the Jewish Welfare Board from 1917 to 1943. He was also a board member of the Inter-Racial Committee, a director of the local Service Men's Club and the United Service Organization, a 33rd Degree Mason, an advisory board member of the American Jewish Relief Committee, and a member of the Theological Club of Charleston, the American Jewish Historical Society, B'nai B'rith, the Hebrew Benevolent Society, the Hebrew Orphan Asylum, the Histadrut Ivrit, and the American Academy for Jewish Research. He supported Jewish communities during and after World War I, and received certificates for his "wartime efforts" by the Four Minute Men and the United States Army and Navy.

Throughout his life, Raisin demonstrated a commitment to community service, civil, and women's rights. In 1945, Raisin sent a telegram to Senator Carl Hatch in support of the Equal Rights Amendment. He was also an outspoken advocate for women's suffrage and anti-racism.

In 1917, Raisin married Jane Levy Lazarus, daughter of Marks Hubert Lazarus.Their children were Mordecai Lazarus, Rachel Marla, and Aaron Spinoza.

Raisin died in Charleston on January 11, 1946.
