= Cannon Building (Troy, New York) =

- U.S. National Register of Historic Places
- U.S. Historic district – Contributing property
- New York State Register of Historic Places
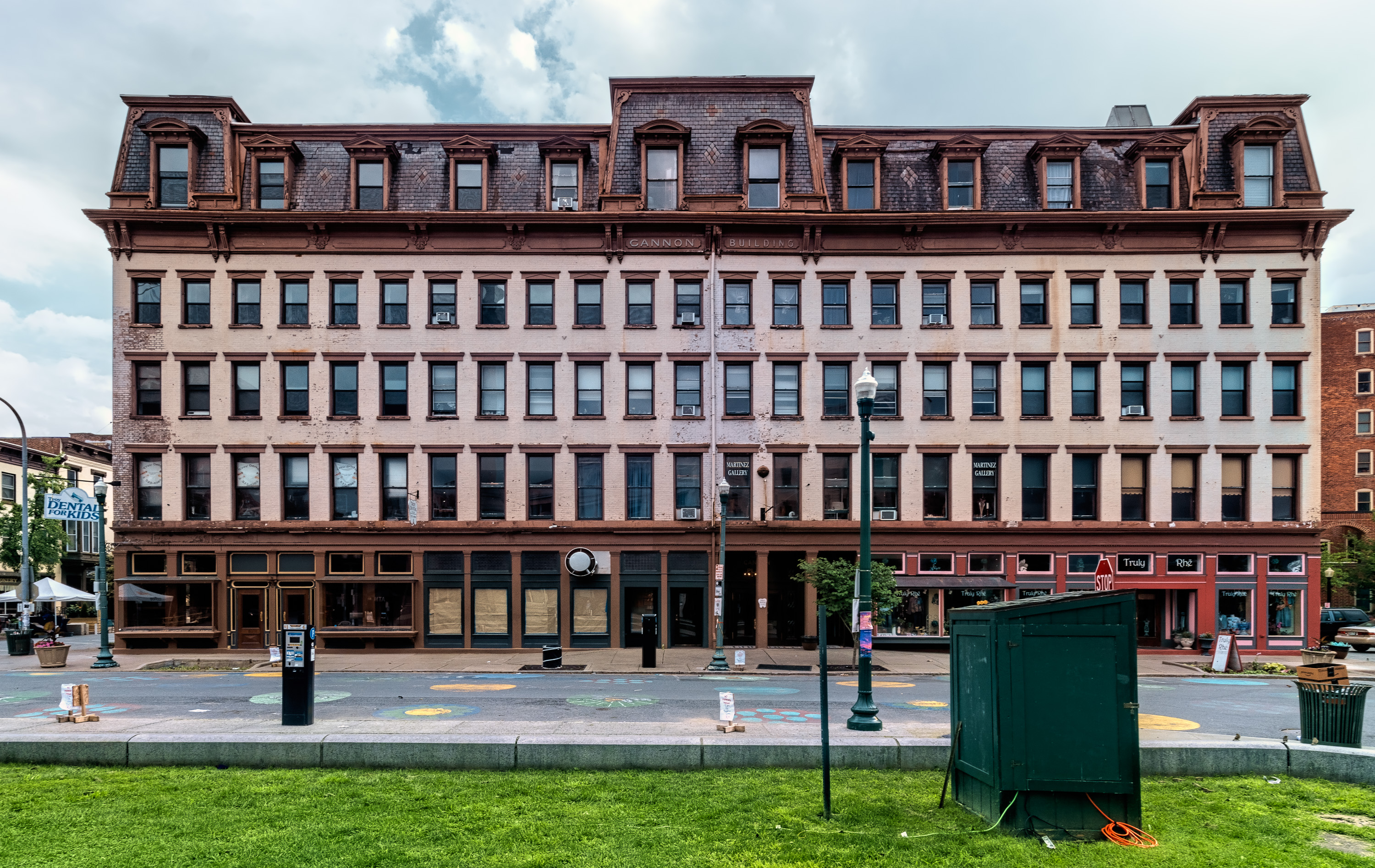
- Front (north) elevation, 2021

- Location within New York Location within the United States
- Interactive map showing the Cannon Building’s location
- Location: Troy, NY
- Coordinates: 42°43′53″N 73°41′32″W
- Built: 1835
- Architect: Alexander Jackson Davis, Ithiel Town
- Architectural style: Greek Revival
- Part of: Central Troy Historic District (ID86001527)
- NRHP reference No.: 70000427
- NYSRHP No.: 08340.000963

Significant dates
- Added to NRHP: March 5, 1970
- Designated CP: August 13, 1986
- Designated NYSRHP: June 23, 1980

The Cannon Building in Troy, New York is located on Broadway between First and State streets. It is the oldest building on Monument Square. It was designed by Alexander Jackson Davis and built in 1835. In 1970 it was listed on the National Register of Historic Places. It is also a contributing property to the Central Troy Historic District, listed on the Register in 1986.

Davis, who collaborated with Ithiel Town on the building, used the then-popular Greek Revival style to produce one of the rare surviving large-scale commercial buildings in that style. After two fires in the years after the Civil War, a mansard roof, usually associated with that era's Second Empire style, was added to the top of the building to create an unusual combination. It continues to be used as a retail-office building, although a developer is redoing the upper floors as an extended-stay hotel.

== Building and history ==
The Cannon Building is five stories high, 22 bays wide by five deep. It is made of load-bearing brick augmented by wooden floor joists inside. The upper story is a mansard roof with bracketed cornice and pedimented dormers.

Originally, it was four stories in height. The mansard roof was added in 1870 during reconstruction in the wake of two fires. The easternmost storefronts are original. In the later 19th century, the building was home to Frear's Troy Bazaar, at the time one of the city's premier retailers. A piano manufacturer and jewelry store were among the later tenants.

In the early 2000s film producer and developer Sandy Horowitz was looking for properties to buy to offset, for tax purposes, the sale of others he had owned in New York City. A broker led him upstate to Troy, where he bought Cannon and several other Monument Square properties. Which he now owes Troy $323,000 in back taxes. He redeveloped the upper three floors into 30 units named Cannon Place for an extended-stay hotel, seeing visiting faculty at nearby Rensselaer Polytechnic Institute and Russell Sage College who wanted to live within walking distance of those institutions as a target market. He also added amenities such as a spa and Internet cafe to the ground floor. In September 2009, the ground floor restaurant was closed for back taxes.
