= Northern River Street Historic District =

Historic district in New York, United States

- U.S. National Register of Historic Places
- U.S. Historic district
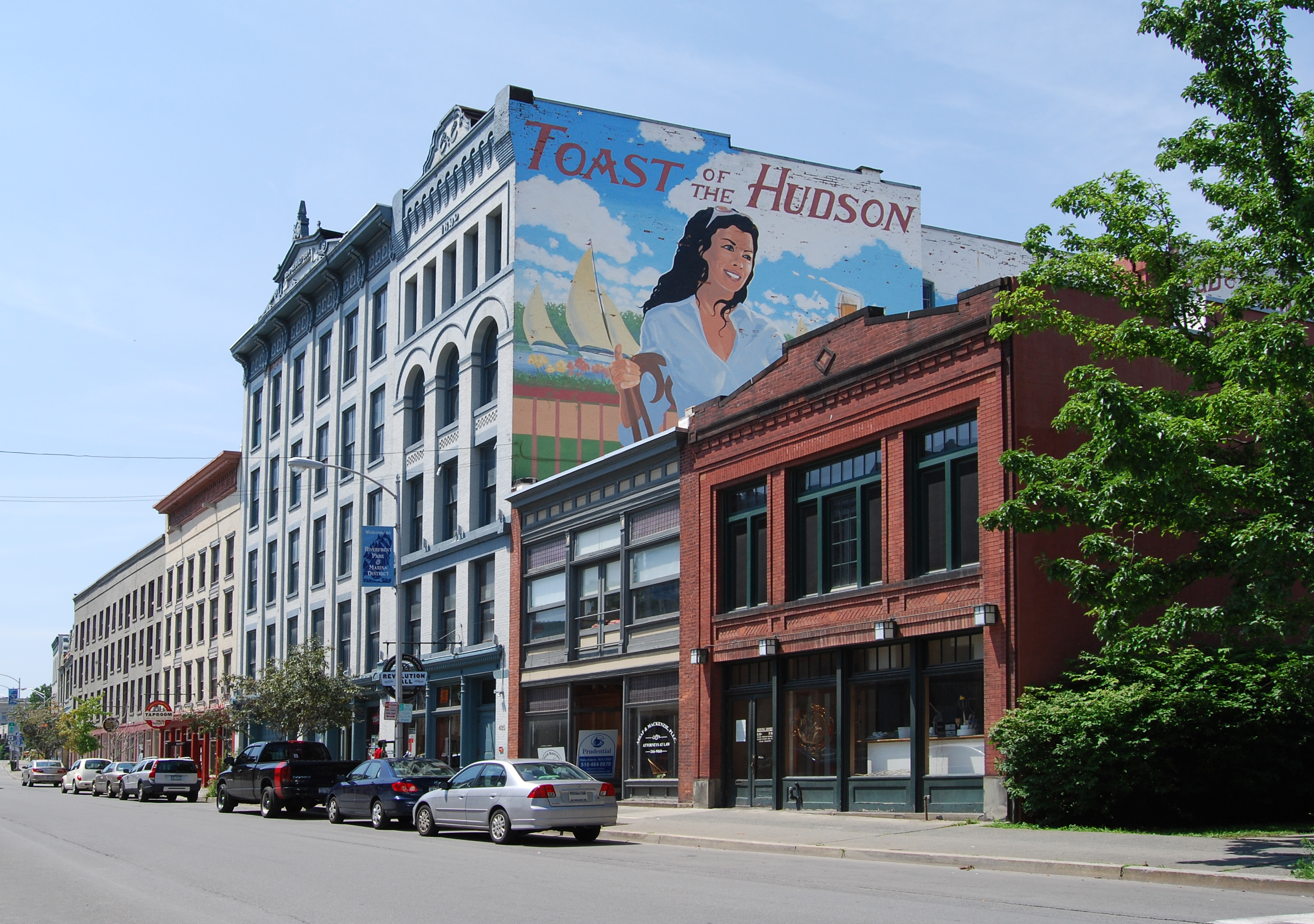
- Looking southwest from the corner of Jacob and River Streets

- Location within New York Location within the United States
- Interactive map showing Northern River Street Historic District
- Location: Troy, NY
- Coordinates: 42°44′07″N 73°41′12″W
- Area: 2 acres (0.81 ha)
- Built: ca. 1840-1910
- Architectural style: Greek Revival, various other contemporary styles
- NRHP reference No.: 88000630
- Added to NRHP: May 19, 1988

The Northern River Street Historic District is located along River Street (southbound US 4 at that point) north of Federal Street, one block east of the Green Island Bridge, in Troy, New York, United States. It was added to the National Register of Historic Places in 1988, as the Northern River Street District, to distinguish it from Troy's previously existing River Street Historic District, which had been one of five superseded by the Central Troy Historic District to the south two years earlier.

Its two acres (8,000 m^{2}) include 13 brick industrial and commercial buildings erected from the mid-19th to early 20th centuries. They were cut off from the rest of downtown due to the construction of the Rensselaer and Saratoga Railroad, and as a result became a production center for the city's major industries, primarily textiles. When those industries declined in the mid-20th century, they were further isolated from the city's center by expansion of Federal Street to provide access to the bridge, and various urban renewal efforts. As a result, they have not seen much redevelopment and remain mostly intact.

== Geography ==
The district is defined by building addresses: 403-429 River Street on the west side, and 420-430 River Street on the east. The resulting district is irregularly shaped, taking in all of the west side between Federal and Jacob streets but only the northern half on the east side.

== Buildings ==
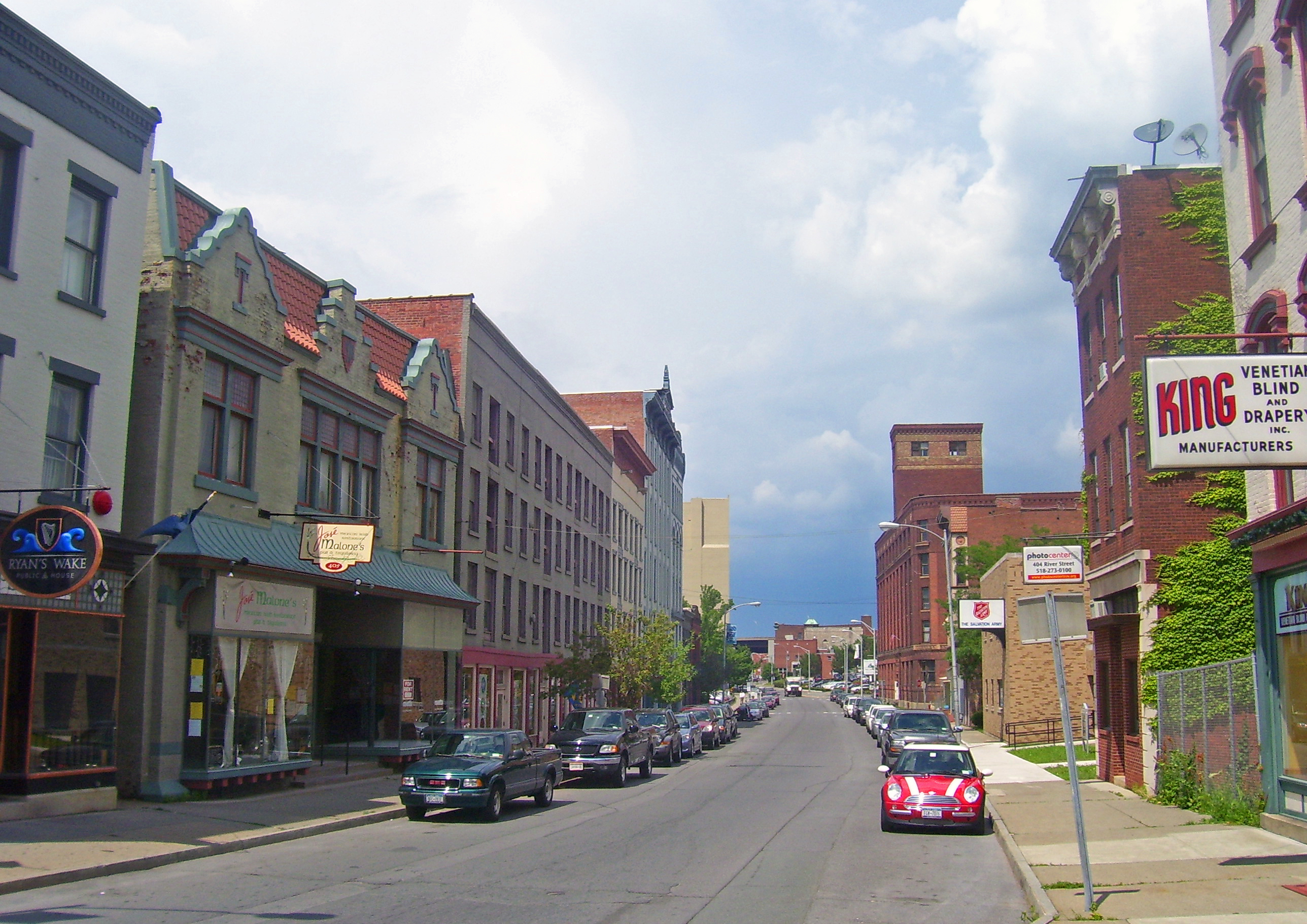
Looking north along River Street from Federal Street

The west side is dominated by 409-415 River Street, a four-story six-bay former warehouse that dates to the 1840s, making it the oldest building in the district. The brownstone pilasters on the storefronts attest to the lingering influence of Greek Revival architecture at the time it was built. Nest door, 417-419 River Street is as tall but only three bays wide, built a decade later with similar design. Next to it is 421-423 River Street, the 1885 Cleminshaw Building of the H.C. Curtis Collar Co. At six bays and five stories, it is the largest building in the district. It boasts an ornate pressed metal cornice with a pediment reading "1868 REBUILT 1884".

At the north end of this row is 425 River Street, a narrower 1892 five-story building showing later influences, with a corbeled brick cornice and molded pediment. The top floor windows are arched; a brick pilaster comes up from beneath to create a rounded arcade. A decorative brick course as well as molded string runs around the building. To its north are two smaller buildings, dating to around 1910, the newest buildings in the district.

To the south of the large warehouses are smaller buildings. At 403 River Street is a three-story building dating to the same period as the warehouses, but 405–407, originally built as the Gaiety Theatre in 1888 and rebuilt with Dutch Colonial Revival stepped gables after a fire twenty years later.

The west side is dominated by three large three-story brick warehouses all built around 1885. To their north, at 428-430 River Street, is a two-story brick building from ten years later.

== History ==
The neighborhood was isolated from downtown by the construction of the Rensselaer and Saratoga Railroad in the 1830s, which ran into Troy on a route paralleling Federal Street from a now-demolished bridge. This, and the river's nearby water power, made it a more desirable location for the commercial detachable-collar factories and warehouses that were opening up as what had been a local cottage industry became the mainstay of the local economy and the product that gave the city an enduring nickname.

Space in the area was limited, and later expansions and additions to the industry found even better facilities available in the city's long northern extension. The railroad tracks were eventually removed when that industry declined along with the collar factories in the 20th century, but the road was expanded to include their right of way. Some of the properties were expanded for different purposes in the 1950s. Local urban renewal efforts in the next two decades also further isolated the area from downtown, but left the remaining River Street buildings intact, preserving them as a transitional block between commercial Troy to the south and industrial Troy to the north.

Today it is not only on the Register, but included as part of the city's Riverfront Historic District. Special zoning ordinances are in place to protect its historic character. It has been redeveloped with small retail outlets and restaurants, such as the River Street Café, upstairs in 429 River Street overlooking the river.
