= Marcus F. Cummings =

American architect

- Born: Marcus Fayette Cummings; March 11, 1836; Utica, New York
- Died: 1905 (aged 68–69)

Marcus Fayette Cummings (March 11, 1836 – 1905) was an American architect active in the Capital District region of the U.S. state of New York. Born in Utica, he later established his practice in the city of Troy, where many of his buildings are located in the Central Troy Historic District and listed on the National Register of Historic Places. Firm listed as Cummings & Brit in the Gazetteer and Business Directory of Rensselaer County, N. Y., for 1870–71. In 1891 he made his son, Frederick, a partner in the office, and promptly retired to Vineyard Haven, Massachusetts, on Martha's Vineyard. He maintained only a financial interest in the office of M. F. Cummings & Son, which would last into the 1930s.

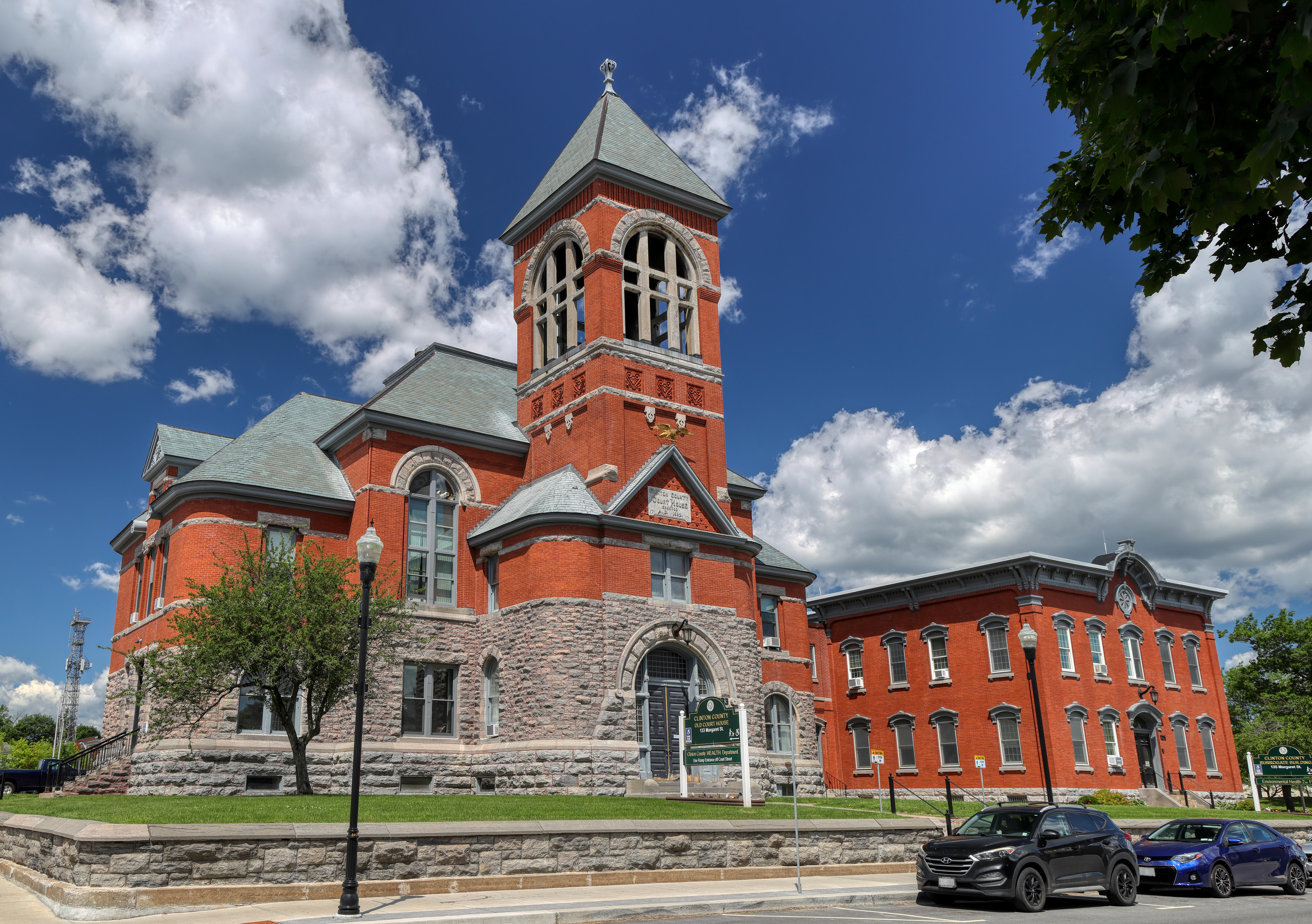
Clinton County Courthouse, Plattsburgh, New York

== Buildings ==
- Verbeck House – Ballston Spa, New York
- Glens Falls Insurance Company Building – Glens Falls, New York
- Rockwell House Hotel – Glens Falls
- North Adams Public Library – North Adams, Massachusetts (built 1865-67 as a mansion for Sanford Blackinton)
- Johnson Manufacturing Company – North Adams (1872)
- Saratoga Springs Town Hall; Saratoga Springs, NY (1871)
- Clinton County Courthouse – Plattsburgh, New York
- Washington County Courthouse – Salem, New York
- Stillwater United Church – Stillwater, New York
- National State Bank Building – Troy, New York
- Ilium Building – Troy
- Rensselaer County Courthouse – Troy
- Mt. Ida Presbyterian Church – Troy
- School 1 Building – Troy
- Jewett House (1872) at 199 East Main Street in North Adams. Eclectic brick and stone trim

== Gallery ==
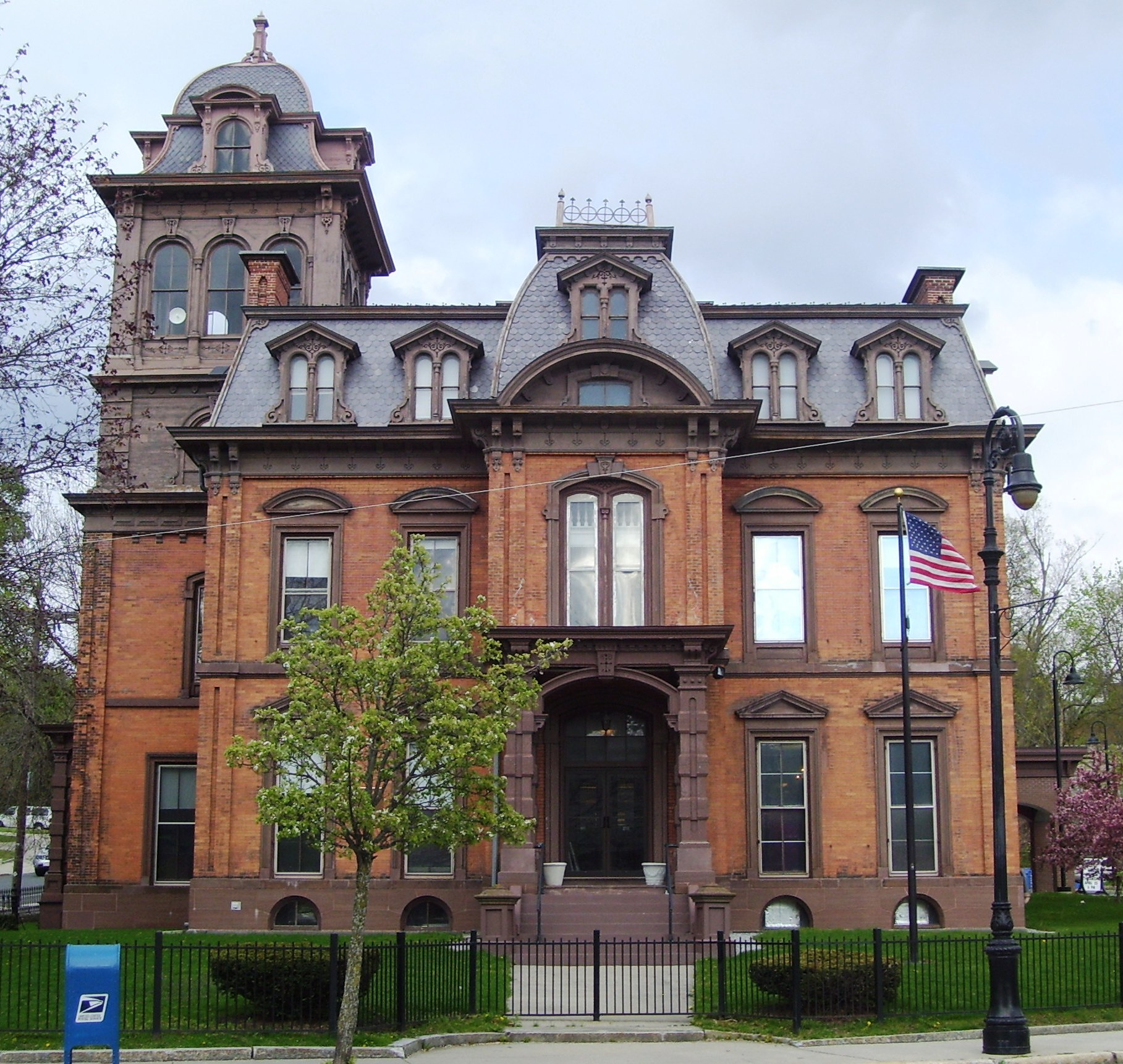
Public Library, North Adams, Massachusetts

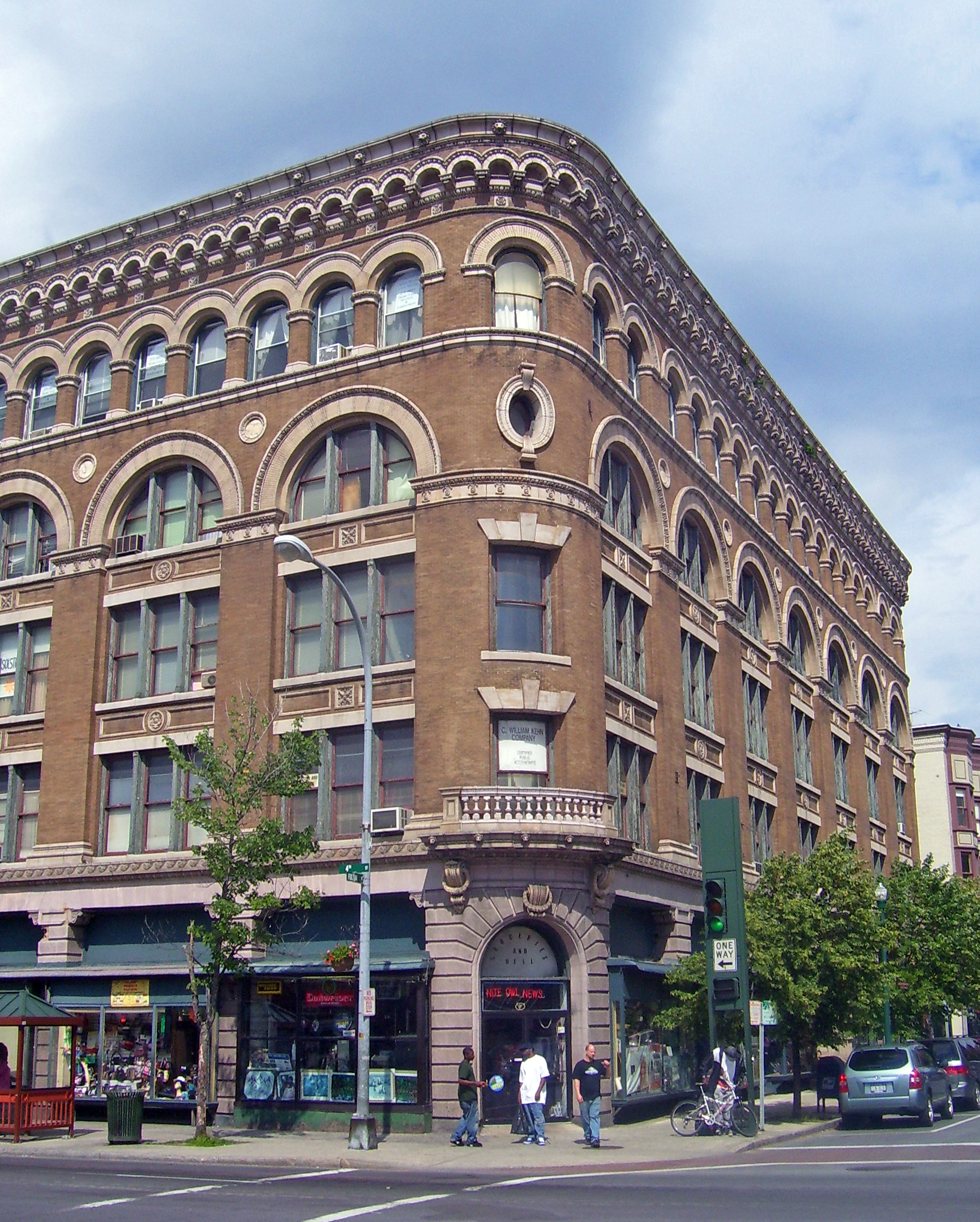
Ilium Building, Troy, New York

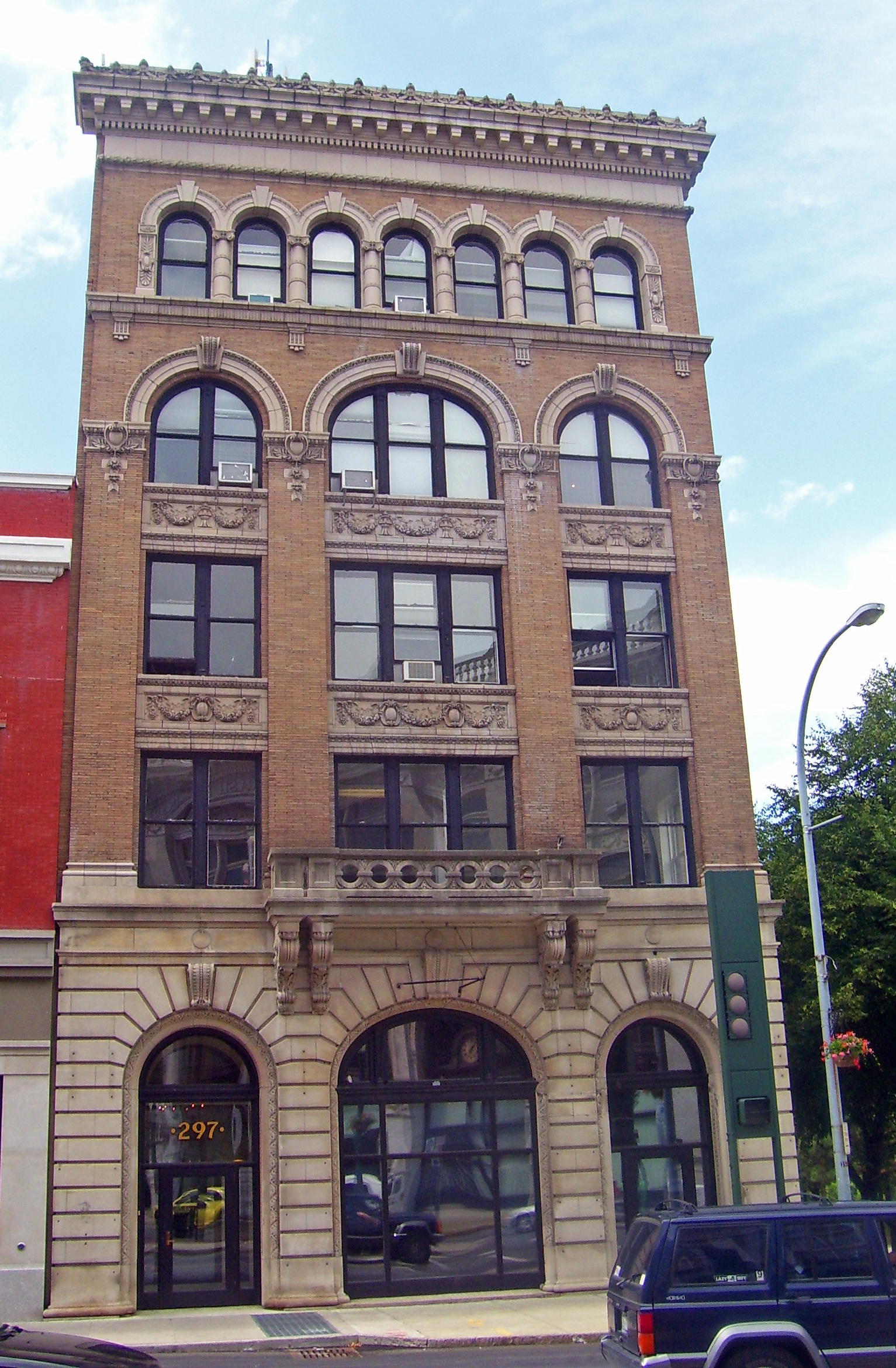
National State Bank Building, Troy

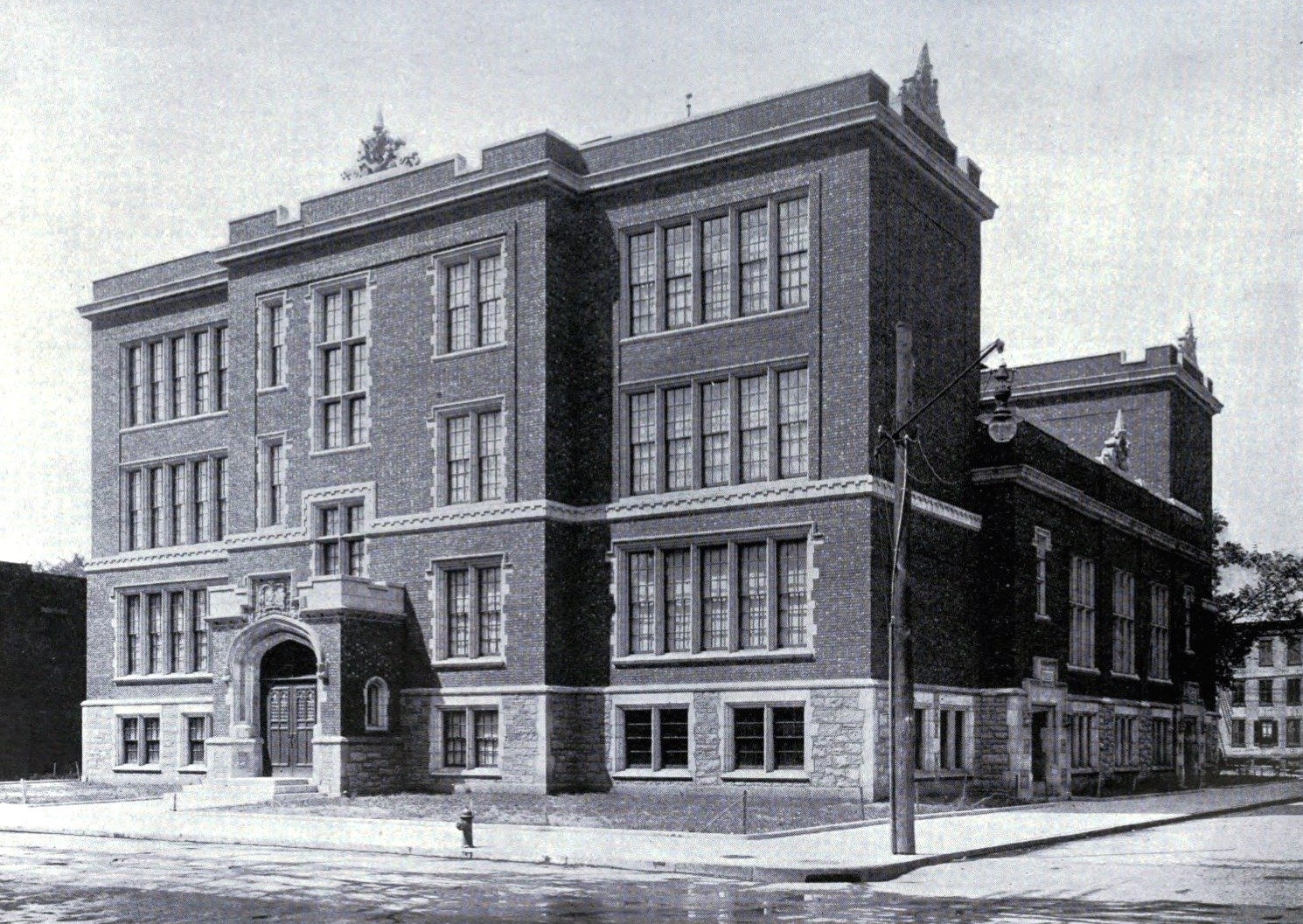
School 1, Troy

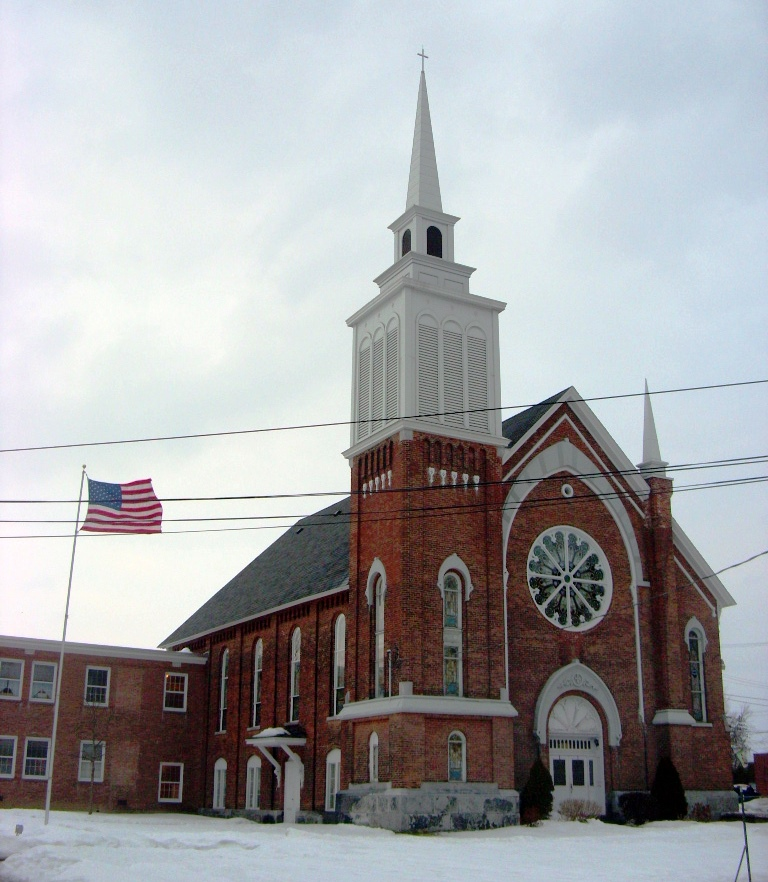
Stillwater United Church, Stillwater, New York
