= Brookside Museum =

Historic house in New York, United States

- Brookside
- U.S. National Register of Historic Places
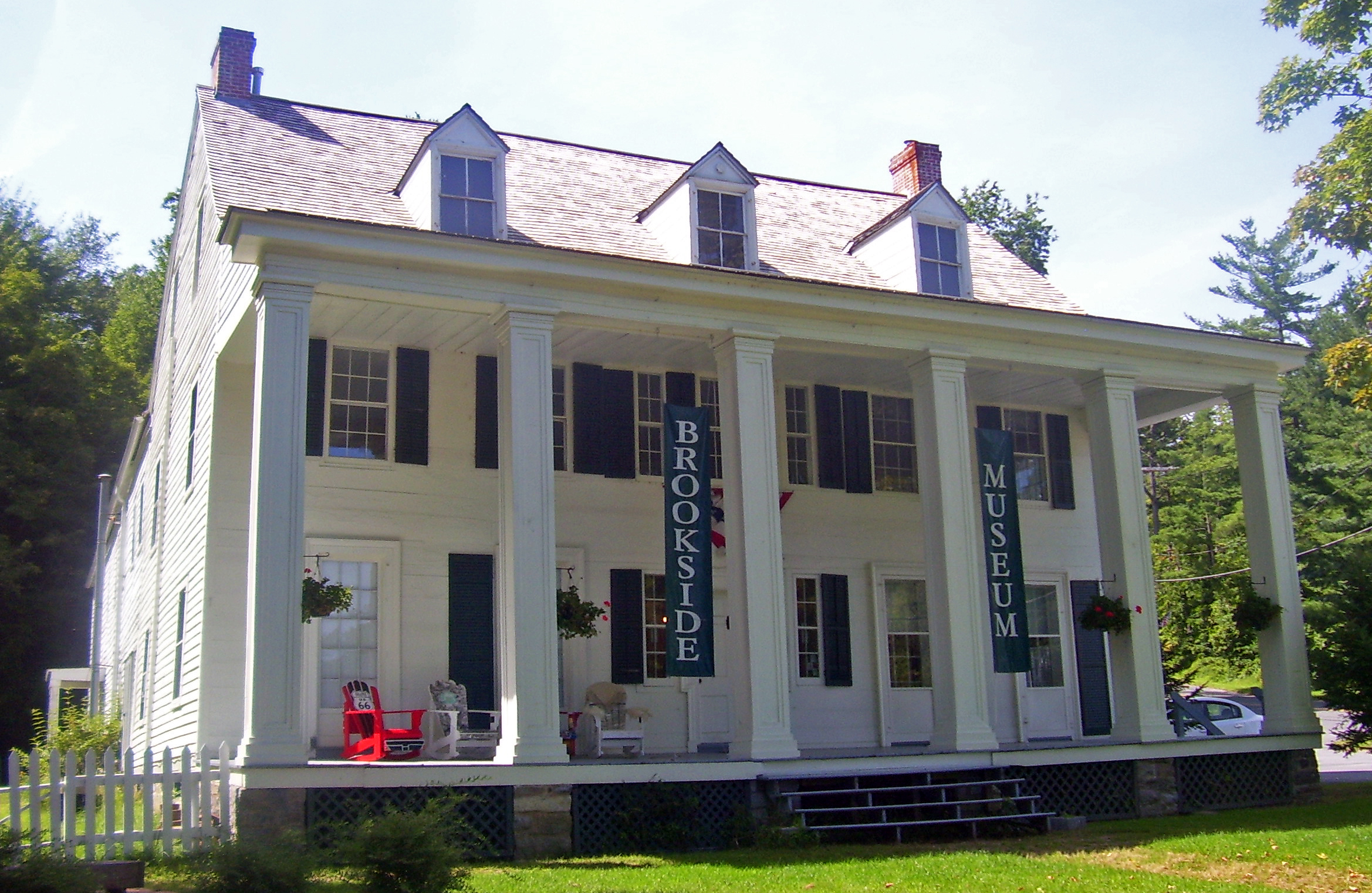
- East elevation and south profile, 2008

- Location within New York Location within the United States
- Location: Ballston Spa, New York
- Nearest city: Saratoga Springs
- Coordinates: 43°0′7″N 73°51′18″W
- Area: 1.5 acres (6,100 m^{2})
- Built: 1793
- Architectural style: Greek Revival
- NRHP reference No.: 75001223
- Added to NRHP: 1975

Brookside Museum, sometimes known as the Aldridge House, is located on the western edge of downtown Ballston Spa, New York, United States. It is a wooden house built in 1792, one of the oldest in the village, but modified since then.

It was originally used as an inn for visitors to the spring waters that gave the village its name, very near its location. The inn had several famous guests; for example, James Fenimore Cooper is said to have written some of The Last of the Mohicans during his stay. The building has been a boys' school, a private residence, a boarding house, a sanatorium, and apartments. In 1970, the Saratoga County Historical Society purchased the building and opened it as a museum.

In 1975 it was listed on the National Register of Historic Places, the first of four properties in the village to be listed.

== Building ==
It is located on the triangular 1.5-acre (6,100 m^{2}) lot where Front Street splits into Charlton and Fairground avenues. The land to the west is wooded, with a small creek flowing north–south across the land. There are some other residences in the area. Downtown Ballston Spa is to the east along Front Street. There is a small dirt parking area on the south side.

The house itself is a two-and-a-half–story, five-by-nine-bay building constructed in stages. The main block in front accounts for three of the lengthwise bays. On the rear is a long extension half the width of the front block, with a two-story shed-roofed section on its own rear.

It is a frame building on a fieldstone foundation sided in clapboard. The steeply pitched gabled roof is covered in cedar shingles pierced by three dormer windows and two brick chimneys at the ends. The two rear sections are covered in asphalt shingles.

Four square pillars support the full-height front porch. Inside, there is little original hardware or woodwork. The staircase, which has simple brackets and a railing with narrow balusters and turned newels, dates to 1860. The framing here is hand-hewn, and the ceilings are low.

== History ==
Local Indian tribes had long known of the benefits of the spring and its naturally carbonated waters. In 1767, they shared it with Sir William Johnson, the British general who had led troops in the region during King George's War and later the French and Indian War. At the time the nearest European settlement was at Ballston Lake.

Later visitors included a team surveying the Kayaderosseras Patent, George Washington and Elkanah Watson. They all spoke and wrote of the curative powers of the spring. After the Revolutionary War, Benajah Douglas, grandfather of Stephen A. Douglas, bought a hundred acres (40 ha) on the west side of the creek opposite the spring to take advantage of the growing tourist trade.

He built a rudimentary log cabin on the site of the present house, the only dry clearing in an otherwise swampy area, where visitors had been camping since Indian times. Later a separate cottage was built for housekeeping.

In 1791, another entrepreneur, Micajah Benedict, built a more luxurious guest house a mile (1.6 km) away. Douglas responded by building the main block of the current structure two years later. It had a columned piazza, though not the current one. He was so successful that others built in the vicinity, beginning the development of Ballston Spa.

Johnson reaped the benefits of his investment and sold to a Joseph Wescot two years later. He, in turn, sold to Josiah Aldridge in 1798. During nearly four decades of ownership, Aldridge would change not only the house but the growing village, which incorporated in 1807.

On the house, he built the rear wing and a north wing (since removed and rebuilt as a residence) with a ballroom. He replaced the piazza with the current colonnade, adding a Greek Revival touch to a mostly Georgian-Federal building. He reworked the inside heavily. And as a trustee of the new village, he worked to improve the area around the spring.

Later in his life, in 1835, the spring finally failed, probably because of the many new ones that had been dug in the area. The next year, Aldridge's family sold the house. Ten years later, in 1846, its owners began to use it as a full-time residence exclusively, ending its days as a hotel. The next year, a new spring was dug just north of the house. It was called the Old Iron Spring, and continues to flow today.

By that time Saratoga Springs, a short distance to the north, had begun to become a bigger attraction for bathers, offering other recreational facilities and thoroughbred horse racing. Ballston Spa's economy switched to industry, with a number of small textile mills opening up in the area.

In 1859, with the Civil War looming, Brookside became a military academy. In 1864, with peace in the offing, it reverted to residential use, first as a single-family residence and later as an apartment house. It was eventually acquired by the Saratoga County Historical Society for use both as a historic house museum and its own headquarters. In addition to exhibits on its own history the museum holds craft classes and hosts an annual Oktoberfest fundraiser

== See also ==
- List of museums in New York
- National Register of Historic Places listings in Saratoga County, New York
