= Peter McCarthy =

Peter McCarthy may refer to:

- Peter McCarthy (film producer), American film producer, director, screenwriter, and actor
- Peter McCarthy (industrialist) (1845–1919), American manufacturer, businessman and philanthropist from Troy, New York
- Pete McCarthy (1951–2004), English comedian, radio and television presenter and travel writer.
- Peter McCarthy, drummer with Big Tom and The Mainliners
