= Peter McCarthy (industrialist) =

American businessman

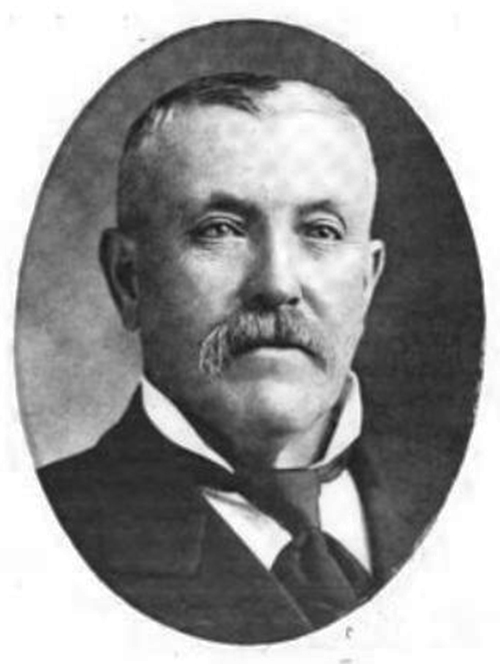
Peter McCarthy.

Peter McCarthy (24 November 1845 – 29 May 1919) was an American manufacturer, businessman and philanthropist from Troy, New York.

== Biography ==
=== Early life ===
Peter McCarthy was born in Troy, New York, on November 24, 1845, to Catholic Irish immigrants Florence McCarthy and Mary Crowley. McCarthy grew up poor. He was educated in Troy's public school system. After graduating Troy High School in 1863, he worked in the sash and bind business in Troy. In 1864 McCarthy traveled west to Clinton, Iowa, and lived there for two years. He then moved to Durham, Pennsylvania, and was employed by the safe manufacturer Lewis P. Lillie. When he returned to Troy, New York, Peter and his brother Charles McCarthy founded C. & P. McCarthy and began trading in waste, rags, wool and cotton. C. & P. McCarthy was located on Riverstreet.

=== Marriage and personal life ===
On April 22, 1879, McCarthy married Julia F. Haley of Troy. They had ten children. McCarthy was also a member of the Catholic Club of New York and gave to Catholic Charities.

=== Textile industry and Troy Waste Manufacturing ===
The Troy Waste Manufacturing Company developed out of C. & P. McCarthy. The company obtained scraps from the local mills and processed them into new materials It was incorporated in February 1883. He served as president of the Troy Waste Manufacturing Company and Faith Knitting Company. He was treasurer of the Hope Knitting Company of Cohoes, the Clover Knitting Company of Waterford, and the Wayside Knitting Company of Troy. He was treasurer of the Troy Knitting Company. In addition to dealing paper, wool, and cotton waste, Troy Waste Co. began manufacturing shoddies and cotton batting.

=== Railroads and other business ventures ===
After his success with the Troy Waste Manufacturing Company, he began to branch out into the Railroad industry. He served as director for the Hudson Valley Railroad, Troy and Cohoes Railroad Company, Columbus, Marion and Bucyrus Railroad Company, and the Lansingburgh and Cohoes Railroad. By 1900 he was director for the Troy Gas Light Company, National State Bank of Troy, International Pulp Company, Troy and West Troy Bridge Company, and Federal Signal Company. He was vice-president of the Troy Trust Company.

=== The McCarthy Building ===
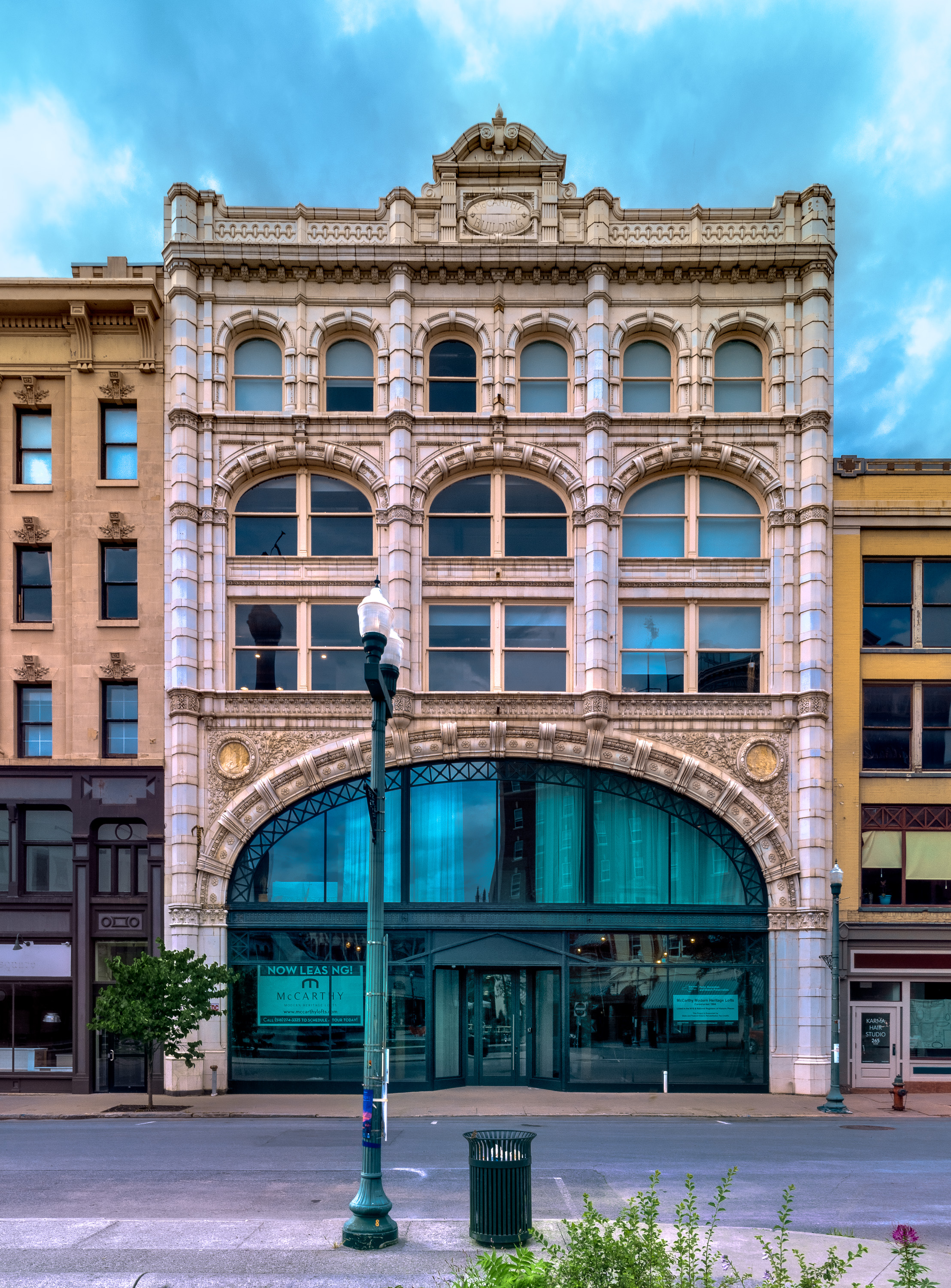
McCarthy Building, Troy New York

In 1883 he built the McCarthy Building. It was destroyed by a fire in 1903, and he rebuilt the current McCarthy Building in the Central Troy Historic District in 1904.

=== Philanthropy and the McCarthy Charities Inc. ===
McCarthy was a philanthropist and contributor to many charities in Troy, particularly to organizations focused on orphans and the poor. He built the Seton Day Home run by the Sisters of Charity and the McCarthy Memorial Chapel. He was a notable benefactor of Saint Peter's Parish of Troy. In 1917, two years before his death, he founded and endowed the McCarthy Charities, Incorporated to be a lasting fund.

=== Death ===
McCarthy died on May 28, 1919, in his home on 1827 Fifth Avenue Troy. at age 74; he is buried in St. Peter's Catholic Cemetery in Troy.

== Politics ==
McCarthy was a republican and served in the United States Electoral College. He was Presidential Elector for New York in the 29th 1900 United States presidential election for William McKinley for President and for Theodore Roosevelt for Vice President of the United States.

== Legacy ==
The McCarthy Charities, Incorporated is a family foundation focused on improving the quality of life in Rensselaer County, especially in education, social services and housing. It is operated today by a Board of Directors composed of Peter McCarthy's direct descendants.
