= United States Post Office (Ballston Spa, New York) =

- U.S. Post Office
- U.S. National Register of Historic Places
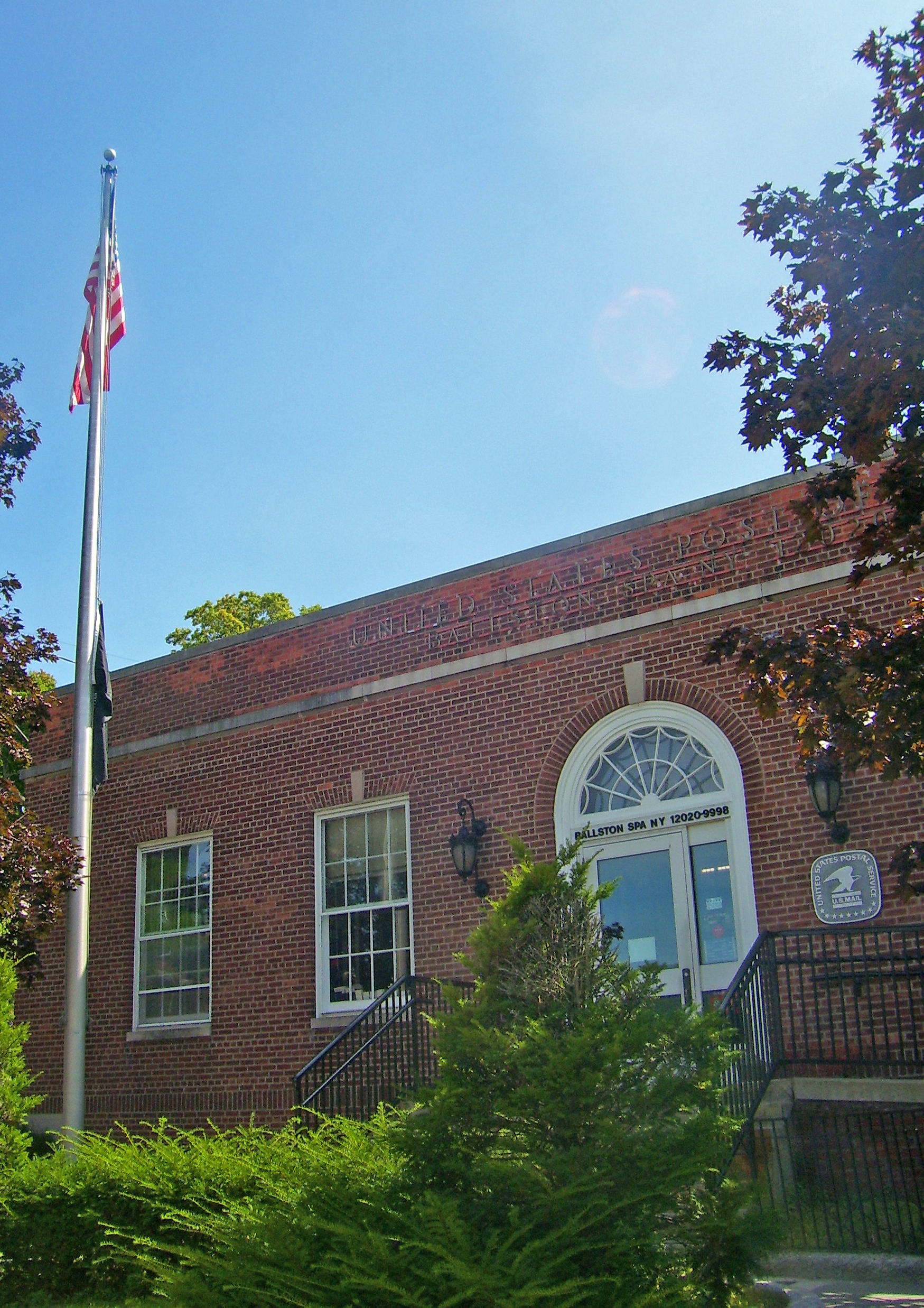
- North elevation, 2008

- Location within New York Location within the United States
- Interactive map showing the location of the U.S. Post Office, Ballston Spa
- Location: 1 Front Street, Ballston Spa, NY, 12020
- Nearest city: Saratoga Springs
- Coordinates: 43°0′8″N 73°50′56″W
- Area: less than one acre
- Built: 1936
- Architect: Louis A. Simon
- Architectural style: Colonial Revival
- MPS: US Post Offices in New York State, 1858-1943, TR
- NRHP reference No.: 88002468
- Added to NRHP: November 17, 1988

The U.S. Post Office in Ballston Spa, New York, is located on Front Street in the village's commercial center. It is a brick building constructed in the mid-1930s, serving the 12020 ZIP Code, which covers the village and the surrounding areas of the Town of Ballston, Town of Milton, and Town of Malta

Designed by Louis A. Simon, supervising architect of the Treasury Department, it uses an extremely restrained version of the Colonial Revival architectural style common on most post offices in small towns from that period. Only one other post office in New York is similar to it. In 1988 it was listed on the National Register of Historic Places.

== Building ==
The post office is located on the south side of Front Street at the corner of Milton Avenue (NY 50/67), Ballston Spa's main street. It is raised slightly above street grade and set back slightly, with some shrubbery in the front. Two large maple trees are at the corners. Across both Front and Milton are two- and three-story commercial buildings. On its west is a driveway leading to the loading dock in back.

It is a one-story, five-by-seven-bay steel frame structure on a raised foundation with a vertical brick watercourse. A wing with the loading dock extends to the west from the rear. The brick is laid in common bond rising to a flat roof and parapet with stone coping.

The north (front) facade is centered around the round-arched main entrance, with modern aluminum and glass doors framed by a carved wooden fanlight surmounted by a vertical brick archivolt and keystone. "BALLSTON SPA N.Y. 12020-9998" is written in black lettering above the door. The windows on the front and lobby sections (the front three bays) on the sides have splayed brick lintels, keystones and stone sills. A stone course goes around the building above the top of the entrance archivolt. "UNITED STATES POST OFFICE BALLSTON SPA, NEW YORK 12020" is spelled out in bronze lettering above the course.

Two sets of stairs lead up from the sidewalk to a curved walk with the main entrance steps in the center. They are stone with iron railings. At the top a wheelchair ramp comes in from the west. The entrance is flanked by two original bracketed lanterns.

The door opens onto a glazed metal vestibule with glazed wooden doors leading into the lobby, which has been altered since the post office was built from an L shape to strictly rectangular. It is floored in ceramic tile and has a coved plaster ceiling. An original wooden dado remains on the east and north walls. Wooden framing remains on the bulletin boards and the entrance to the postmaster's office has a wood surround with denticulated cornice.

== History ==
Following its incorporation as a village in 1807, Ballston Spa's post office was located in several different buildings, including at one point the Sans Souci opera house almost across the street from the present location. Eventually, given its role as the Saratoga county seat, pressure grew for a permanent, dedicated postal facility in the village.

Congress did not authorize one for Ballston Spa until 1931, as part of an early relief program at the outset of the Great Depression. Since it was necessary to acquire the land, on which four buildings stood, it took until 1935 before it was built by a New York City-based general contractor within Congress's $85,000 ($2 million in contemporary dollars) limit and opened.

Treasury Department Supervising Architect Louis A. Simon was in charge of the design. Like many post offices in small towns built during that period, it was a brick Colonial Revival building, following Treasury policy. Simon's design is an unusually restrained version of that style, with minimal use of its decorative features, compared to other contemporary New York state post offices such as the one in Scotia. Only one other Simon-designed post office from that era, the one in Ilion, shows similar restraint, down to the flat roof.

The interior was later altered slightly, with the L-shaped lobby converted into a merely rectangular one and the dado removed from two of the walls. The teller windows were replaced with modern ones and aluminum lockboxes added. Other than that there have been no significant additions to the building.

== See also ==
- National Register of Historic Places listings in Saratoga County, New York
