= Stillwater United Church =

Historic church in New York, United States

- U.S. National Register of Historic Places
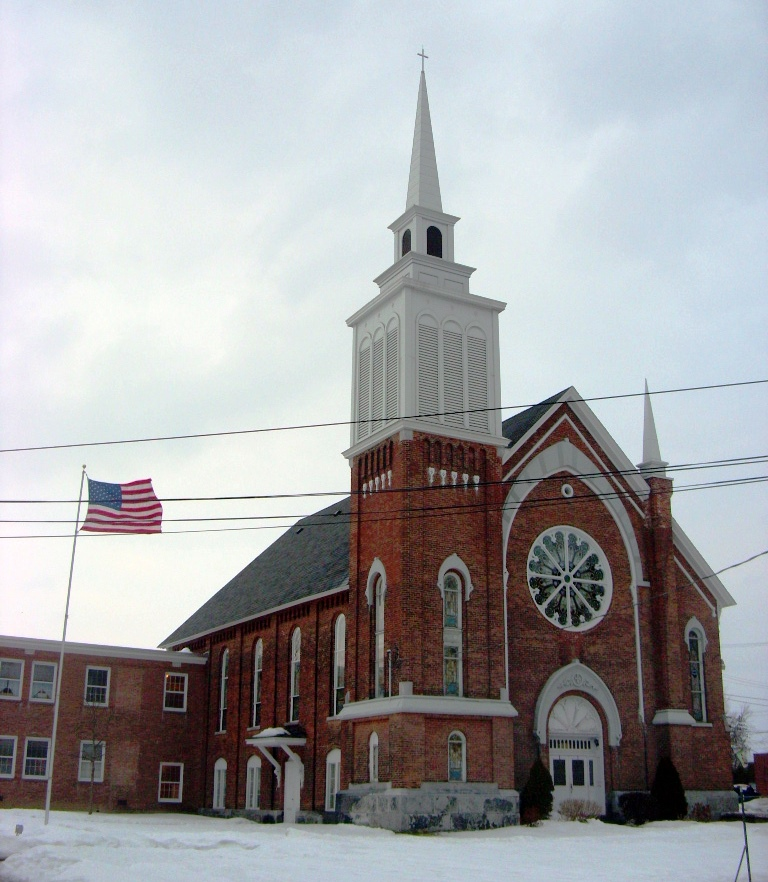
- Stillwater United Church, February 2009

- Location within New York Location within the United States
- Location: 135 Hudson Ave., Stillwater, New York
- Coordinates: 42°56′20″N 73°39′15″W
- Area: less than one acre
- Built: 1873
- Architect: Cummings, Marcus F.
- Architectural style: Italianate
- NRHP reference No.: 06000887
- Added to NRHP: September 28, 2006

Stillwater United Church, formerly known as Second Baptist Church, is a historic church at 135 Hudson Avenue in Stillwater, Saratoga County, New York. It was designed by architect Marcus F. Cummings and built in 1873. It has a rectangular, gable roofed sanctuary above a raised basement of cut limestone blocks in an early Romanesque or Northern Italianate style. It features an engaged brick bell tower culminating in a belfry and topped by a tall spire. A two-story brick education wing was added in 1952.

It was listed on the National Register of Historic Places in 2006.
