= Verbeck House =

Historic house in New York, United States

- U.S. National Register of Historic Places
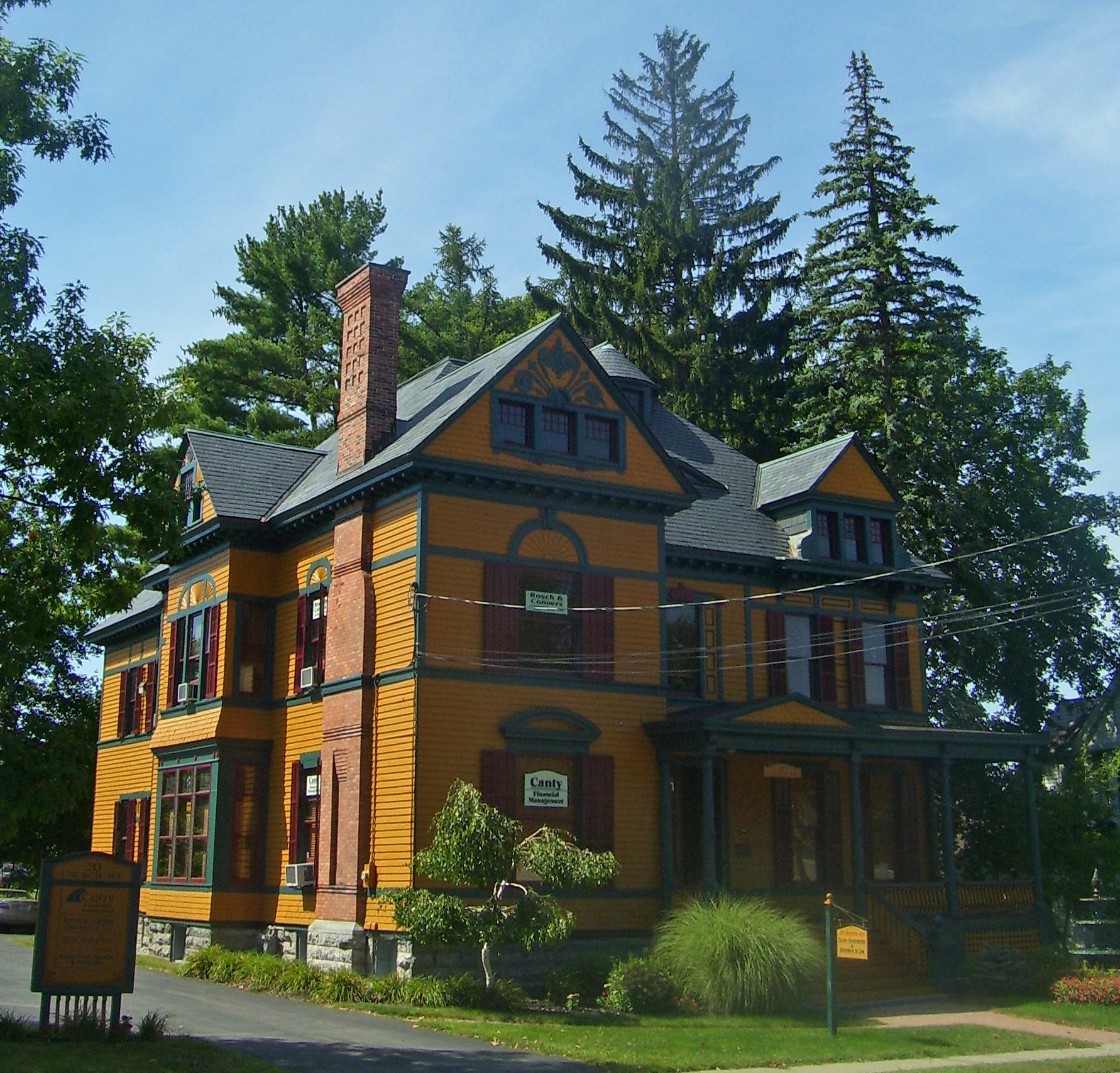
- East elevation and south profile, 2008

- Location within New York Location within the United States
- Location: Ballston Spa, New York
- Nearest city: Saratoga Springs
- Coordinates: 43°0′0″N 73°50′56″W
- Area: less than one acre
- Built: 1889
- Architect: Marcus F. Cummings
- Architectural style: Queen Anne
- NRHP reference No.: 83001790
- Added to NRHP: April 7, 1983

The Verbeck House is located on Church Street (NY 50) just south of downtown Ballston Spa, New York, United States. It is a frame house built in the late 19th century.

It was one of the last buildings designed by regionally important architect Marcus F. Cummings. The building is one of the few houses he designed late in his career, and one of his few in the Queen Anne architectural style. It retains much of its ornate period interior decorations.

In 1983 it was listed on the National Register of Historic Places. It was used for a time afterwards as the National Bottle Museum, which obtained a state matching grant to restore it. The museum later moved to larger quarters in the village's downtown following a legal dispute with its parent organization. Today the house is home to some professional offices.

== Building ==
The house sits on a small lot on the west side of the street, just south of High Street (NY 67), partially shaded by tall trees. A parking lot has been built on the south side to serve the offices. The surrounding neighborhood is mostly residential.

It is a two-and-a-half-story, four-by-six-bay house on a stone foundation, mostly sided in narrow clapboard with bands and panels emphasizing the structural supports. The slate roof is surrounded by a modillioned cornice. There are projecting two-story bays on the south and east, with a one-story raised balustraded porch on the east at the main entrance. Windows have decorative lintels. A corbeled brick chimney rises on the south end.

The main entrance is a six-panel wooden door with stained glass sidelight and transom. It opens onto a central hall, decorated with early Art Nouveau style wallpaper in an embossed floral pattern, running nearly the length of the house, giving access to parlors and other rooms paneled in cherry. A walnut staircase with turned balusters rises to the second floor. Doors at the west end of both hallways have stained glass in the pattern of the hall decoration.

On the floor, the oak in a parquet pattern is original. The house also has rare chandeliers that can support either gas or electric lights, functional steam radiators and an intact butler's pantry. It does not appear to have ever had any outbuildings.

== History ==
The house was designed for James Verbeck, a prominent local attorney. It was one of the last houses built by Cummings, an architect known primarily for his commercial buildings in downtown Troy, before he retired in 1891. Most of his previous houses were built before 1869, in the wake of a devastating fire in Troy, and those were in the Italianate and Second Empire styles. His use of elements of the Queen Anne style here is a strong contrast to his earlier residential work.

Verbeck's descendants owned the house until 1978, maintaining it and its furnishings near their original state. The next year, it was donated to the Federation of Historical Bottle Clubs, and converted into the National Bottle Museum. In 1989, the museum obtained a $46,000 state grant to restore the house, repainting it in the original colors, ascertained through paint chip analysis. The museum celebrated its ten-year anniversary in the house and the house's centenary with several events, including a bottle collectors' gathering and auction.

Three years later, during a dispute between the federation and the museum, run by the National Bottle Museum Society, the museum was evicted. A covenant in the deed by which the Verbecks donated the house provided that if it were not used as a museum, ownership would revert to the family. As a condition of the grant that restored the house, which required that the house continue to be used as a museum for at least 23 years, the covenant was lifted. The federation put the house on the market. It is now the offices of a local insurance agency. and financial management firm.

== See also ==
- National Register of Historic Places listings in Saratoga County, New York
