= St. Mary's Church (Ballston Spa, New York) =

Coordinates: 43°0′20.22″N 73°50′58.67″W

- St. Mary's Church
- Location: 167 Milton Avenue; Ballston Spa, New York
- Country: United States
- Denomination: Roman Catholic
- Website: www.stmarysbspa.org

History
- Status: Active
- Dedication: Saint Mary

Architecture
- Completed: 1867

Administration
- Province: New York
- Diocese: Albany

Clergy
- Archbishop: Timothy Cardinal Dolan
- Bishop: Edward Bernard Scharfenberger
- Pastor: Fr. Francis R. Vivacqua

St. Mary's Church is a Catholic parish located in Ballston Spa, New York. It is located within the Roman Catholic Diocese of Albany. Father Francis R. Vivacqua is the current pastor. St. Mary's is the fourth oldest parish in the Diocese. St. Mary's of Ballston Spa has a mission church, St. Mary's of Galway.

== School ==
St. Mary's Catholic School is located next to the church in Ballston Spa. Students grades K–5 are enrolled at the school, and there is also a pre-school. The current principal is Katie Fleming.
