= National Bottle Museum =

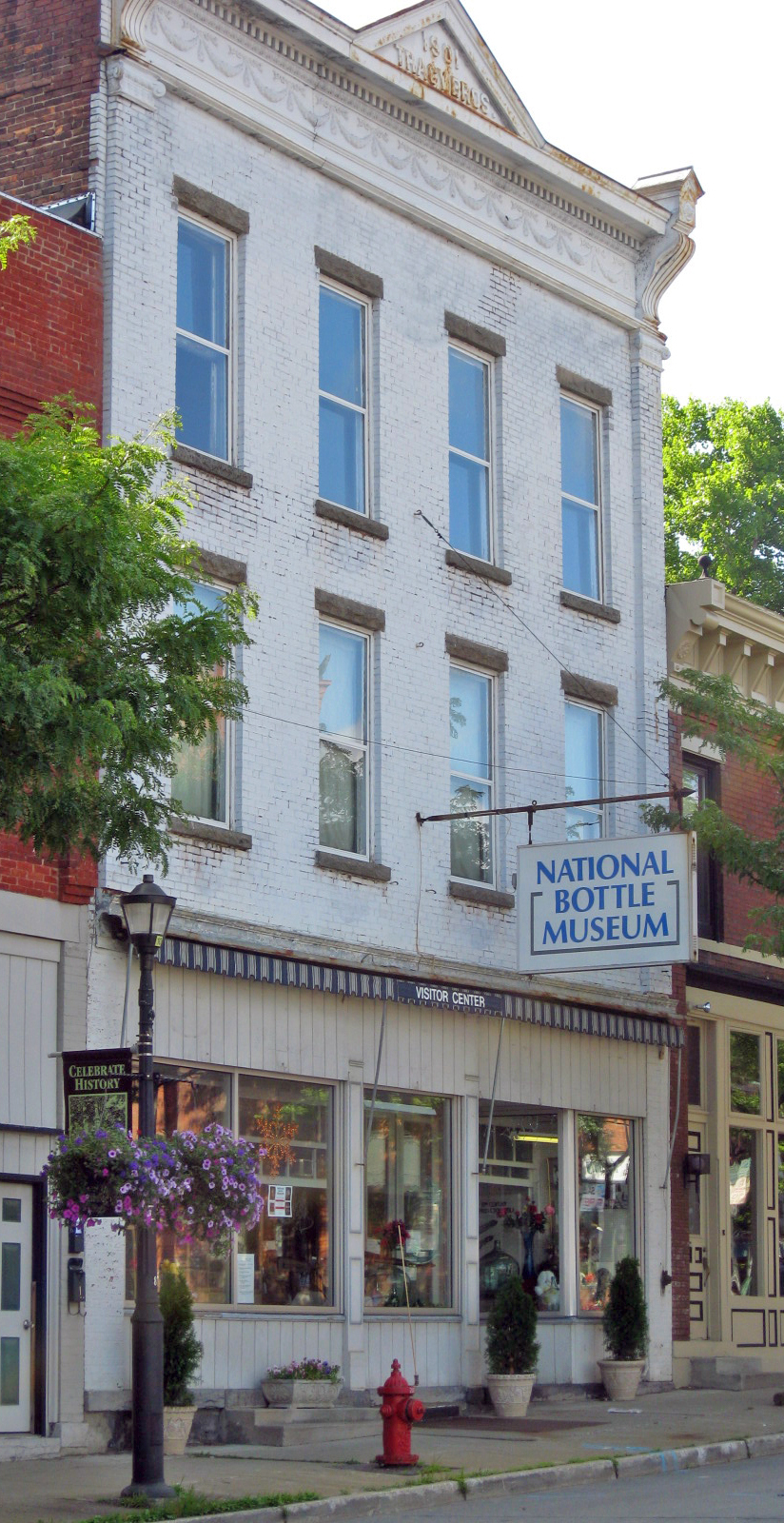
- Museum building on Main Street in Ballston Spa
- Established: 1978
- Location: 76 Milton Avenue, Ballston Spa, NY, USA
- Coordinates: 43.0032757°N 73.8488444°W
- Type: Historical museum
- Collection size: 2,000 handmade glass bottles
- Visitors: 3,500
- Website: National Bottle Museum

The National Bottle Museum is located on Milton Avenue (NY 50/67) in downtown Ballston Spa, New York, United States. Established in 1978, it has a collection of over 3,700 antique bottles, most made prior to industrialization of the process in 1903. It has moved from its original location, a historic house which it restored, after a legal dispute with its founding organization.

In 1996 it received a charter from the state Board of Regents. The museum also exhibits the tools of early bottle making.

== History ==
In 1978 the Federation of Historic Bottle Clubs, an umbrella organization of antique bottle collector groups all over the country, pooled their resources to create the museum. The idea had come from Bernard Puckhaber, a German immigrant and the longtime Ballston Spa village clerk. The village had been an early center for bottle manufacture because of the naturally carbonated mineral water from its nearby springs, which also attracted tourists who bathed in the waters and gave the future village its name. Water from Ballston Spa was shipped all over the world. A factory in nearby Greenfield employed hundreds of workers and glassblowers during its years of peak production during the mid-19th century.

The museum's original home was the historic Verbeck House, also in Ballston Spa. The federation bought the house from the descendants of its original owner, and renovated it for use as a museum. Later they moved to the current location.

The new location, a three-story storefront in downtown Ballston Spa, allowed the museum to take advantage of its proximity to the only two of Ballston Spa's original springs still flowing. The former Sans Souci hotel, on one of the springs, is across the street, and the Old Iron Springs, which flow year-round, is nearby.

A 1901 house nearby has also been used as a demonstration glassworks in the past, complete with an electric furnace, but the museum has had to stop using it because of the high electric bills.

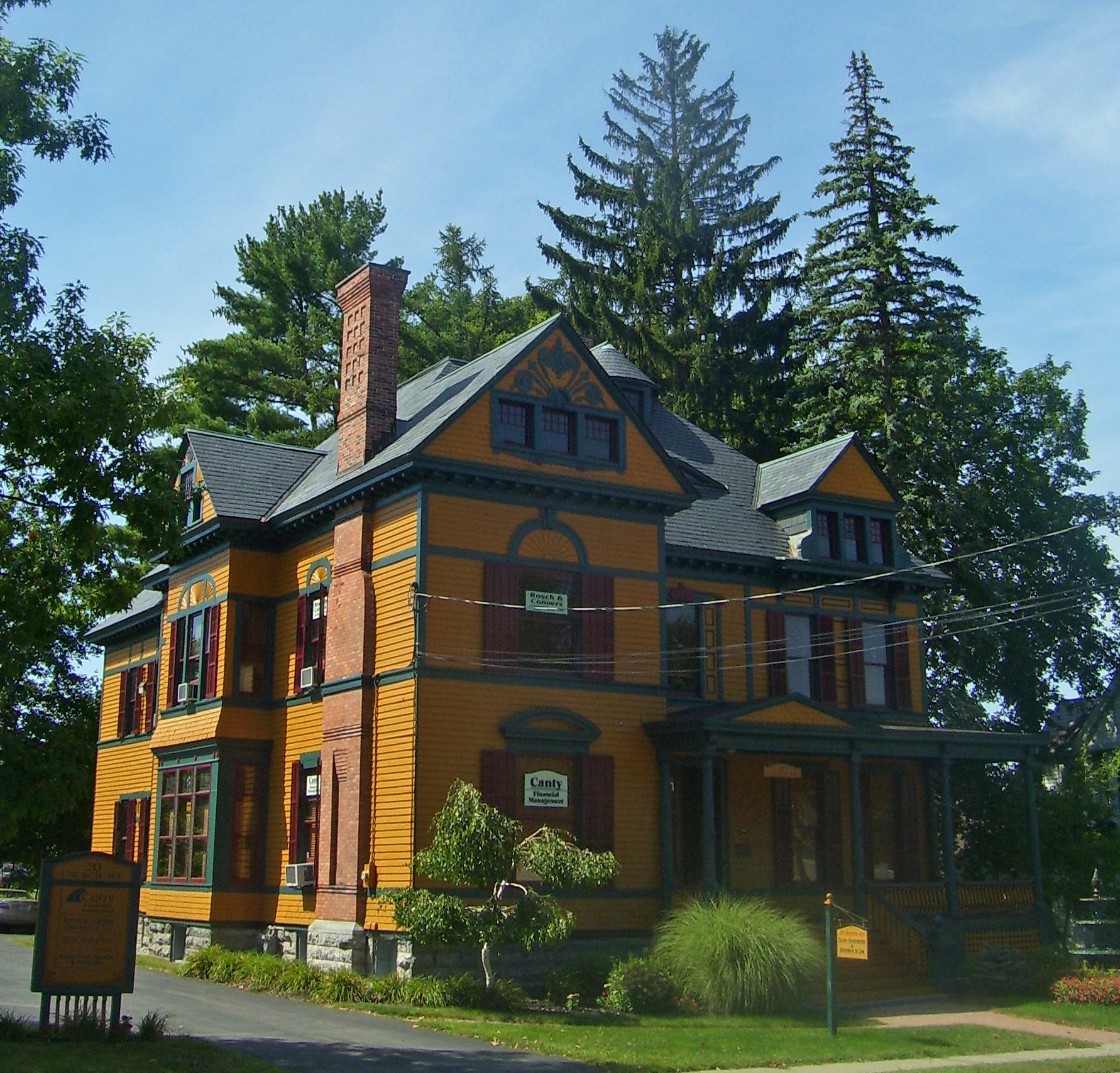
Verbeck House, as restored by the museum

Six years later, in 1992, the museum left the Verbeck House when a dispute between the museum management and the Federation, which had changed its name to the Federation of Historic Bottle Clubs, ended up in court. The National Bottle Museum Society, which had been formed to operate the museum, insisted it owned the bottles as well. In June a judge ruled that the federation could evict the society from the premises. A year later the society found the present site, and moved in. Later that year a settlement allowed the museum to keep the collection in Ballston Spa.

In 2006 the museum was featured in an episode of the Travel Channel's Cash & Treasures. Later that year the village sought another state grant to allow the museum to renovate its third floor into an artists' dormitory. In February 2007 it was named Organization of the Month by the Lower Adirondack Regional Arts Council.

In 1986 Jan Rutland, a garage sale enthusiast, visited the museum. She began volunteering after attending one of the museum's seminars. Rutland was eventually appointed the museum's president. Rutland died in 2010, leading to an immediate cutback in museum hours.

== Facilities and programs ==
The bottle museum is currently housed primarily in the three-story building. Its collection of more than 3,500 bottles, some on loan from bottle clubs all over the U.S. and Canada, are on the shelves. They were used for holding everything from milk and fruit to bitters and soda. The oldest in the collection are a set of black glass bottles, made in Europe and said to have been used for rum or gin. The oldest Bottle in the Museum is estimated to have been made between 1710 and 1725.

Other exhibits show the tools of bottle making, and a miniature model of a glass oven. The second story has been used as an art gallery, with exhibits of not only original glass art created by local artists, but paintings dealing with everything from local subjects to the Holocaust. Rutland has defended the art gallery, saying "we are a history museum and (both) the bottles and this exhibit represents history and art and technology. So it's all worth seeing and preserving." There is also a research library, with an antique pharmaceutical counter, with records dating to 1904.

Every year, in June, the museum sponsors a 160-table bottle show and auction at the Saratoga County Fairground. It is open to the public, and collectors from all over the U.S. and Canada attend.

They also help hire Young Kids through the Saratoga Youth Center's Job Program.

== See also ==
- List of museums in New York
