= Public School No. 10 (Troy, New York) =

- U.S. National Register of Historic Places
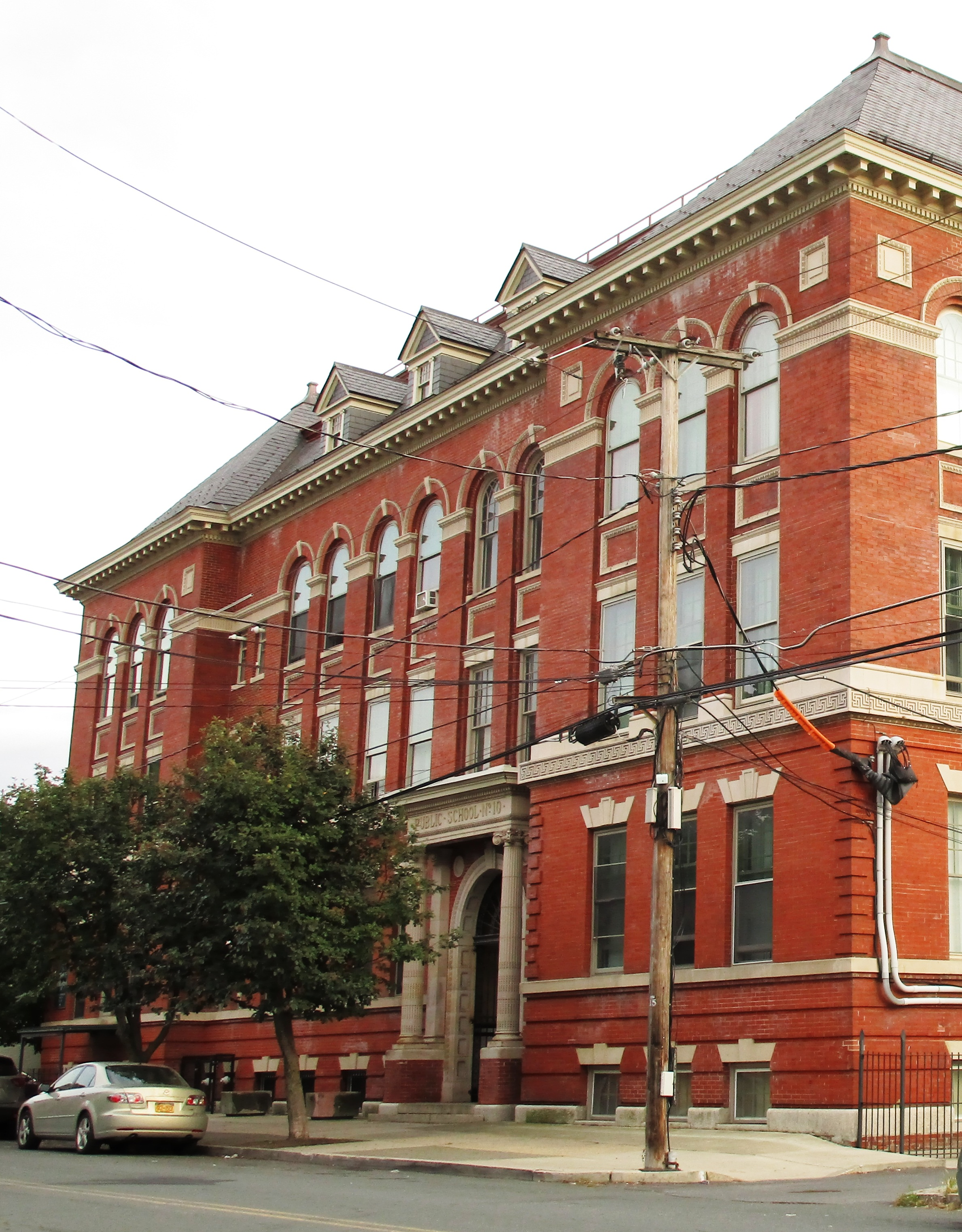
- Public School No. 10, September 2017

- Location within New York Location within the United States
- Location: 77 Adams St., Troy, New York
- Coordinates: 42°43′22″N 73°41′34″W
- Area: less than one acre
- Built: 1898
- Architect: M. F. Cummings & Son
- Architectural style: Colonial Revival, Georgian Revival
- NRHP reference No.: 94001281
- Added to NRHP: November 04, 1994

Public School No. 10 is a historic school building located at Troy in Rensselaer County, New York. It was built in 1898 and is an H-shaped, three-story, hard-glazed orange brick building on an elevated basement in the Georgian Revival style. It has limestone and terra cotta trim. The entrance features a projecting terra cotta portico on a raised brick-and-limestone base. It was converted to multi-family housing in 1992.

It was listed on the National Register of Historic Places in 1994.
