= Johnson Manufacturing Company =

- U.S. National Register of Historic Places
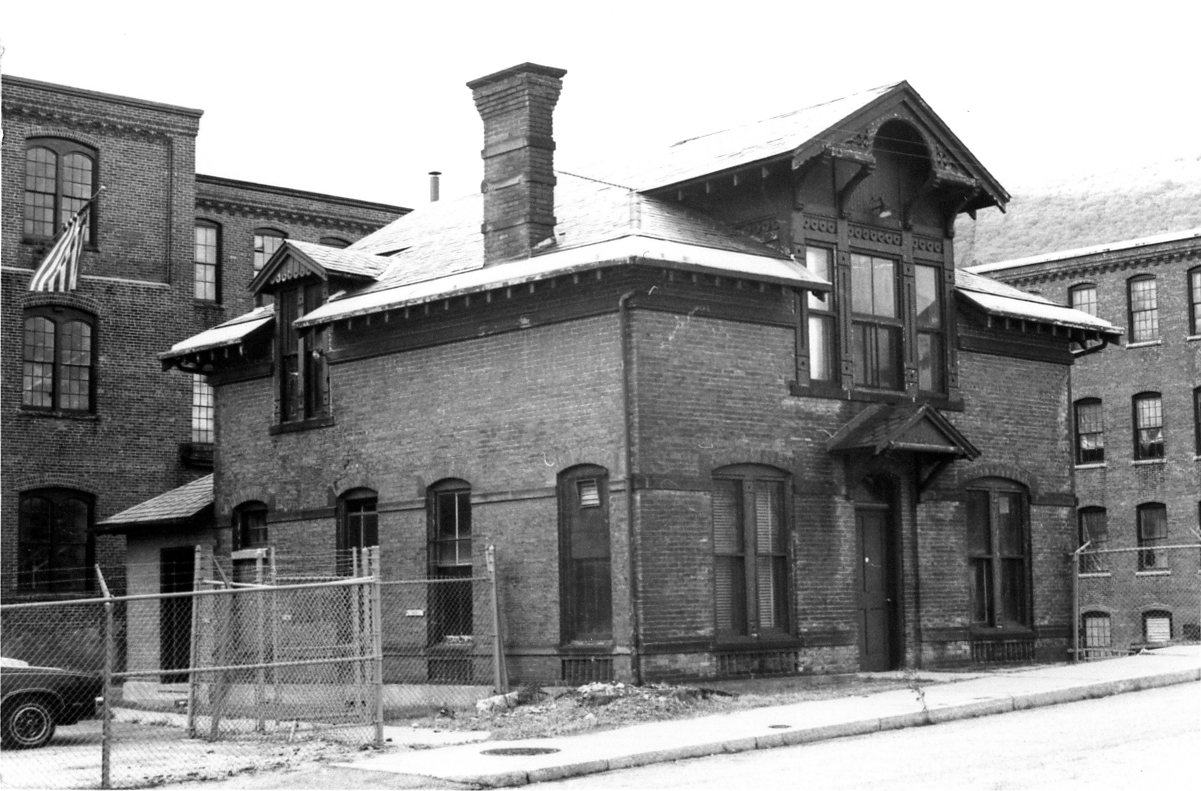
- office building, c. 1985

- Location within Massachusetts Location within the United States
- Location: 65 Brown St., North Adams, Massachusetts
- Coordinates: 42°42′8″N 73°7′18″W
- Area: 4.6 acres (1.9 ha)
- Built: 1872
- Architect: Marcus F. Cummings
- Architectural style: Italianate
- MPS: North Adams MRA
- NRHP reference No.: 85003418
- Added to NRHP: October 25, 1985

The Johnson Manufacturing Company was a historic mill complex at 65 Brown Street in North Adams, Massachusetts. Developed beginning in 1872 and enlarged through the early 20th century, it was at the time of its 1985 listing on the National Register of Historic Places a well-preserved example of late 19th century industrial architecture, used for the production of textiles for many years. The complex was demolished in 2007.

== Description and history ==
The Johnson Manufacturing Company complex was located west of downtown North Adams, on a parcel of 4.6 acres (1.9 ha) bounded on the east by Brown Street, the north by the Hoosac River (which initially provided the mill's power), and the south by railroad tracks. The complex included a main three-story mill building built in 1872, to which a number of smaller buildings were built on in the following decades. Most of the buildings exhibited modest Italianate styling typical of late 19th century mill construction. At the front of the complex stood a 1-1/2 story office building, built about 1880 to a design by Marcus F. Cummings, a prominent mill designer from Troy, New York.

The Johnson Manufacturing Company was founded in 1850 by Sylvander Johnson, Nathaniel G. Hathaway, George W. Bly, and Peter Blackinton. The company acquired an existing print shop on this site, and produced cotton textiles until 1871, when it was destroyed by fire. They then built the main mill, consolidating operations from other sites in North Adams, and modernizing its technology. The company produced textiles here until 1937, when it was sold to the Sprague Electric Company. Sprague produced gas masks on the site during World War II, and then converted it to the production of specialized materials used in electrical capacitors. Industrial toxic wastes dumped at the site during this period resulted in a contaminated groundwater plume, necessitating the demolition of nearby houses. The site was shuttered in 2001, its last occupant having been Commonwealth Sprague. The property underwent remediation to deal with the toxic legacy, and the buildings were demolished in 2007.

== See also ==
- National Register of Historic Places listings in Berkshire County, Massachusetts
