= M. F. Cummings & Son =

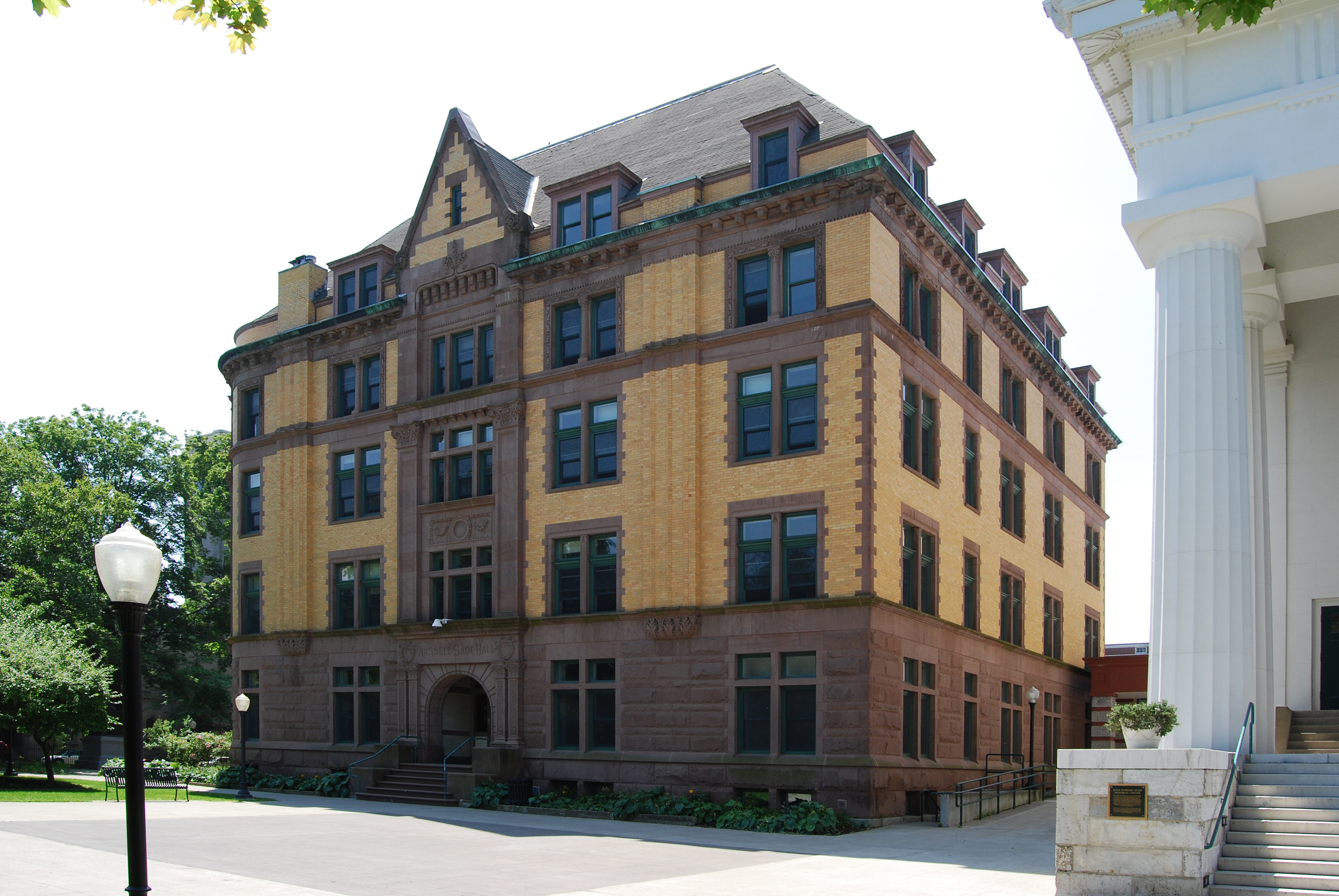
Sage Hall, Troy Female Seminary, 1895.

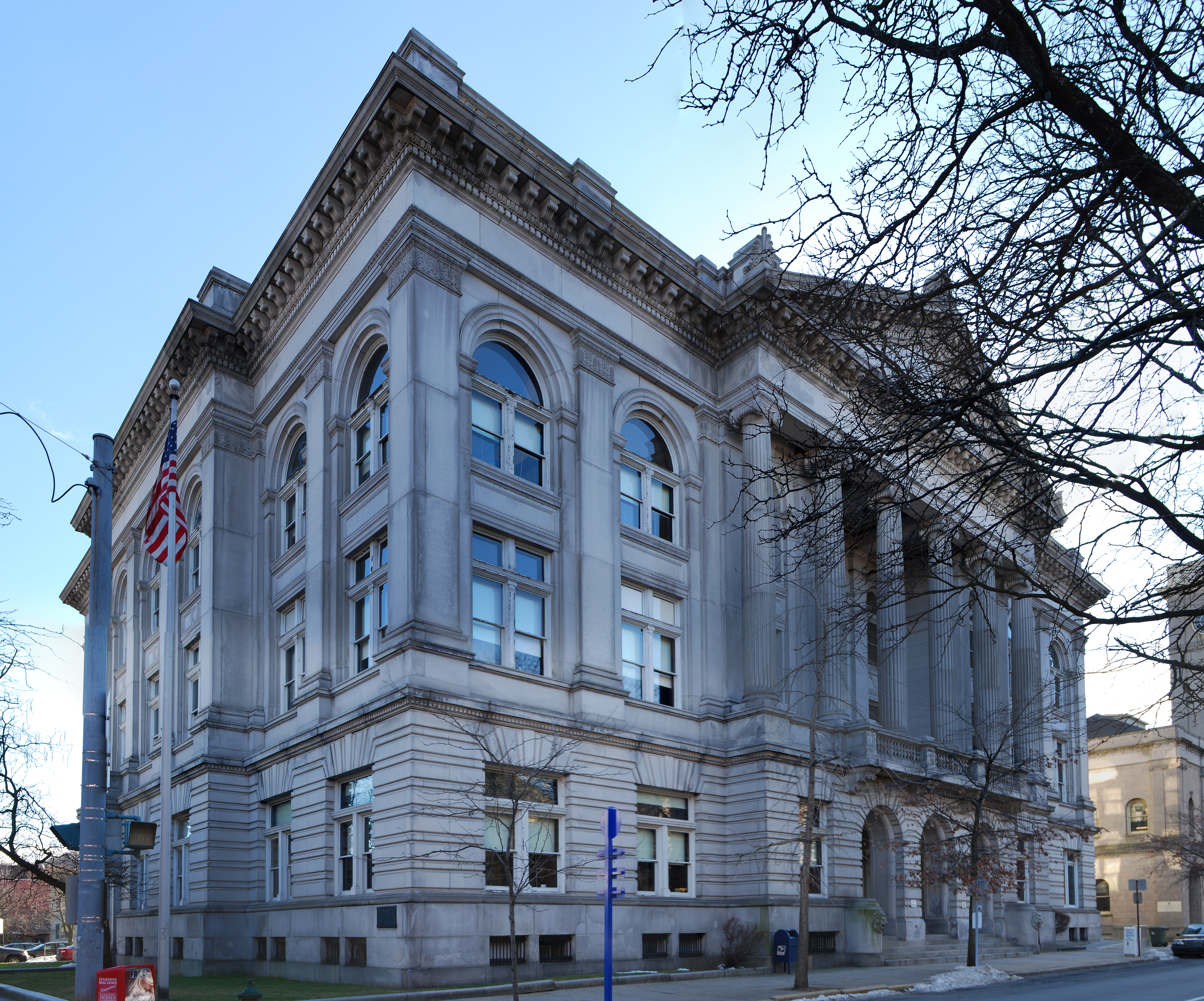
County Courthouse, Troy, 1896.

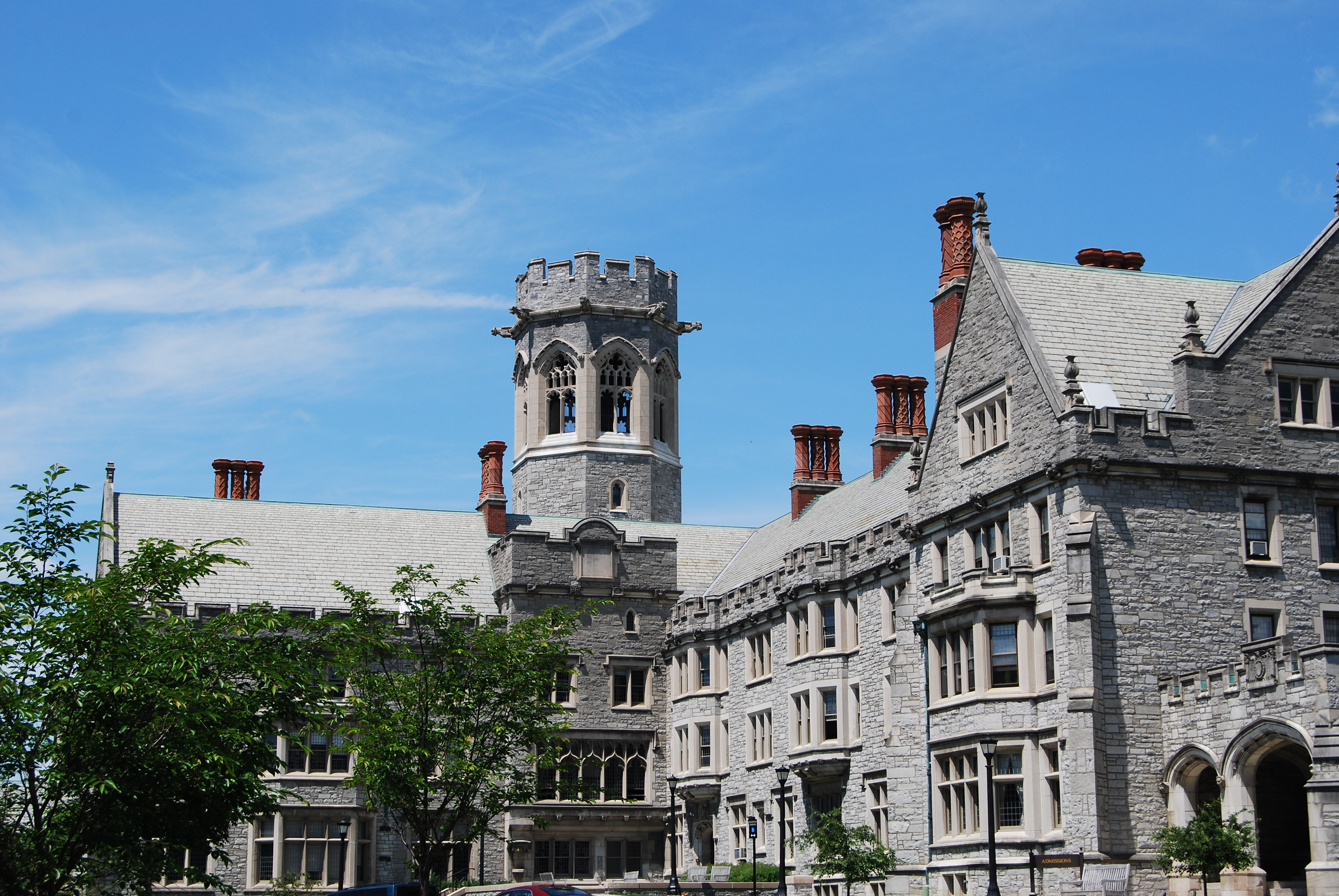
Emma Willard School, Troy, 1908.

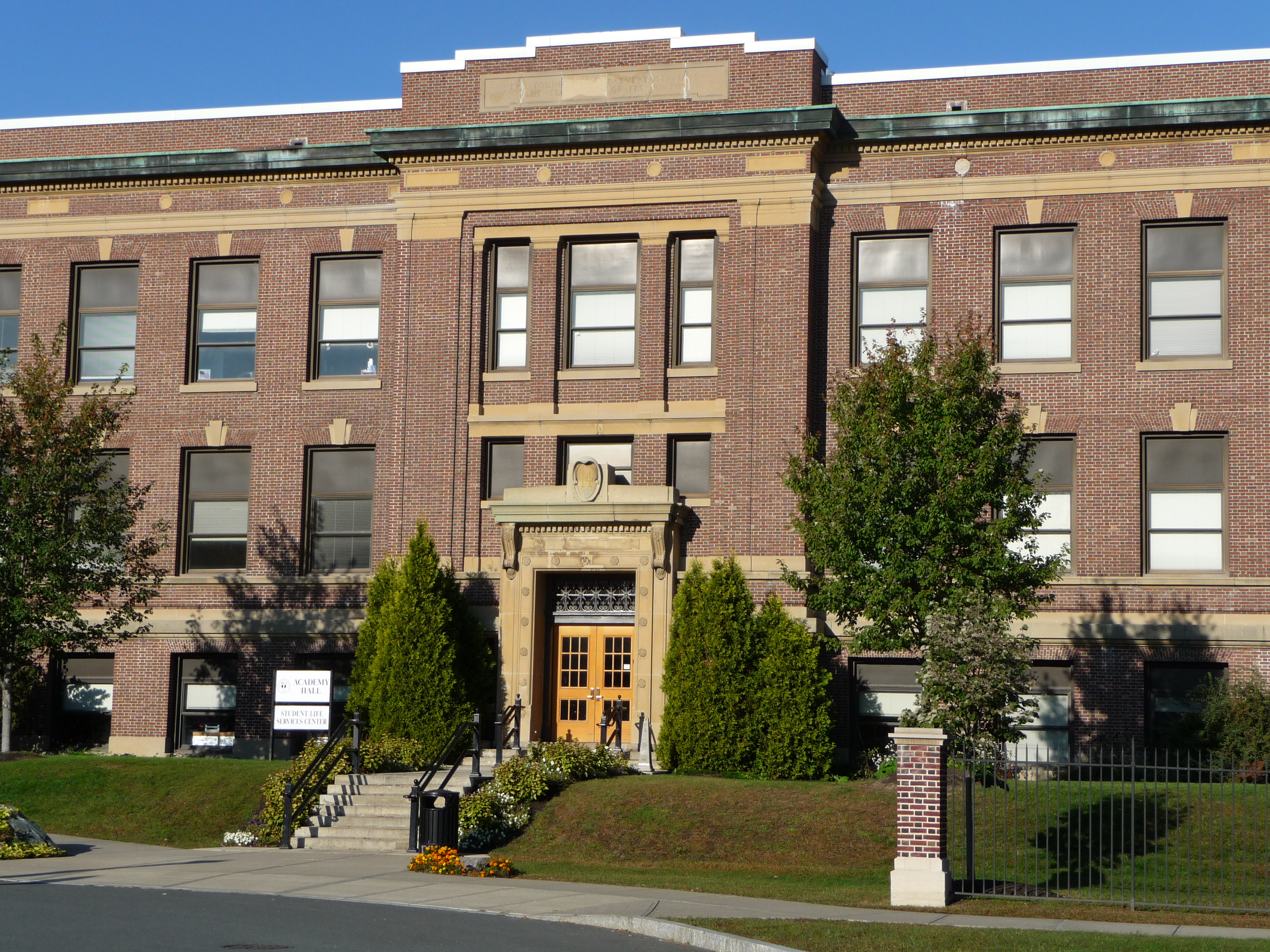
Public School No. 14, Troy, 1921.

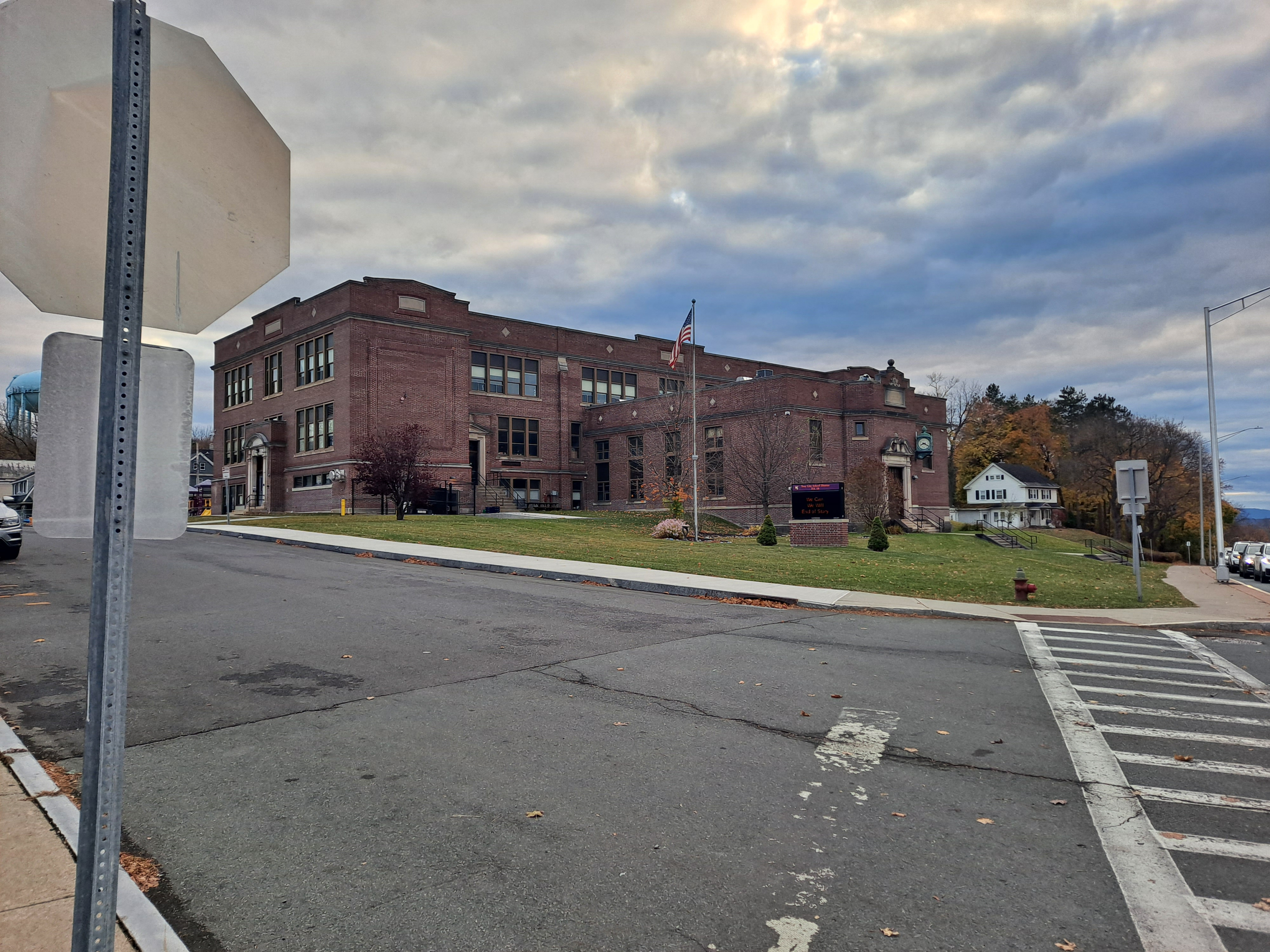
Public School No. 18, Troy, 1927.

M. F. Cummings & Son was an architectural firm from Troy, New York, founded upon the 1891 retirement of architect Marcus F. Cummings. He left the office in the hands of his son, Frederic M. Cummings, and only kept a financial interest. Cummings retired to Martha's Vineyard. The office lasted into the 1930s.

Cummings & Son was responsible for many important buildings in Troy and the surrounding region, including the campus of the Troy Female Seminary, the Rensselaer County Courthouse, and many public and private schools.

== Architectural works ==
- 1891 - Gurley Memorial Hall, Troy Female Seminary, Troy, New York
- 1893 - Anna M. Plum Memorial Hall, Troy Female Seminary, Troy, New York
- 1895 - Mohawk and Hudson River Humane Society Building, 77 4th St, Troy, New York
- 1895 - Russell Sage Hall, Troy Female Seminary, Troy, New York
- 1896 - Rensselaer County Courthouse, 80 2nd St, Troy, New York
- 1898 - Public School No. 10, 77 Adams St, Troy, New York
- 1898 - St. Mary's R. C. Church, 196 3rd St, Troy, New York
- 1899 - St. Augustine R. C. School, 525 4th Ave, Lansingburgh, New York
- 1902 - Hotel Allen, 26 Main St, Fair Haven, Vermont
  - Demolished.
- 1903 - National State Bank Building, 297 River St, Troy, New York
- 1904 - Ilium Building, 406 Fulton St, Troy, New York
- 1905 - Alanson J. Baker House, 307 S William St, Johnstown, New York
- 1908 - Troy Waste Manufacturing Company Building, 444 River St, Troy, New York
- 1908 - Emma Willard School, 285 Pawling Ave, Troy, New York
- 1909 - Public School No. 1, 2920 5th Ave, Troy, New York
- 1915 - First Presbyterian Church, 61 3rd St, Waterford, New York
- 1916 - St. Agnes R. C. School, 45 Johnston Ave, Cohoes, New York
- 1917 - St. Francis R. C. Academy, 311 Congress St, Troy, New York
- 1921 - Public School No. 14 (Former), 15th St, Troy, New York
  - Now owned by the Rensselaer Polytechnic Institute.
- 1922 - Williams Memorial School, 71 N 3rd St, Hudson, New York
- 1927 - Public School No. 18, Hoosick Street, Troy, New York
- 1935 - Union National Bank Building, 50 4th St, Troy, New York
