= Ilium Building =

- U.S. National Register of Historic Places
- U.S. Historic district – Contributing property
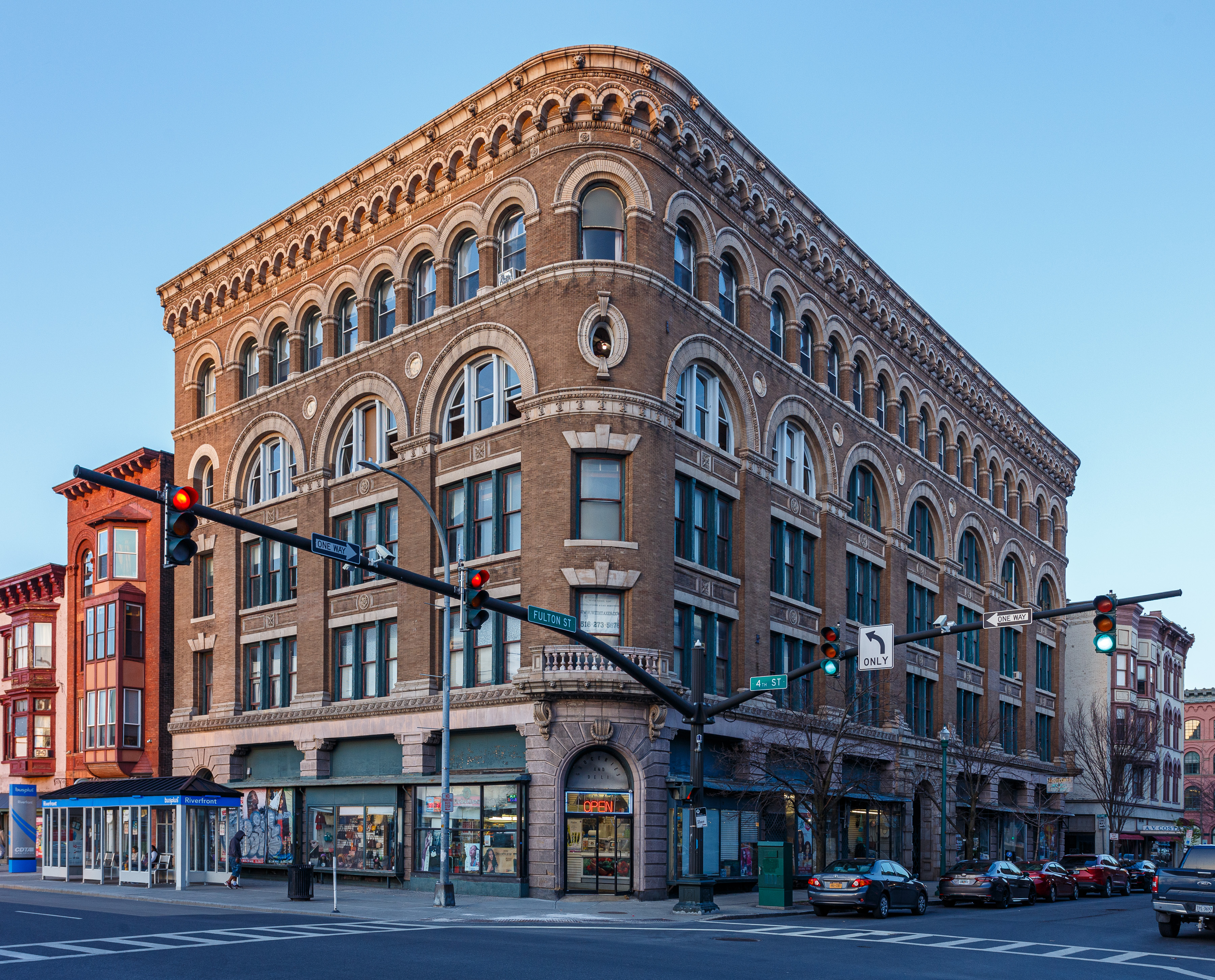
- East and south facades, 2008

- Location within New York Location within the United States
- Location: Troy, NY
- Coordinates: 42°43′57″N 73°41′18″W
- Built: 1904
- Architect: M. F. Cummings & Son
- Part of: Central Troy Historic District (ID86001527)
- NRHP reference No.: 70000429

Significant dates
- Added to NRHP: December 18, 1970
- Designated CP: August 13, 1986

The Ilium Building is a building located at the northeast corner of Fulton Street and Fourth Street in Troy, New York, United States. It was listed on the National Register of Historic Places on August 13, 1970, and since 1986 has also been a contributing property to the Central Troy Historic District. Its street address is 400 Fulton Street.

The Ilium Building is designed in the Beaux-Arts style, and is described as handsome. The building is five stories high and was one of Troy's first tall buildings, featuring one of the oldest elevators in the city. The building's exterior features detailed stonework. The building's name, Ilium, is another term for classical Troy. The building is located next to the Fulton Street Gallery.

The building was constructed in 1904. It was designed by Troy-based Cummings architectural firm. Some sources attribute the design to Marcus F. Cummings (1836-1905), while others attribute the design to Frederick M. Cummings. Marcus Cummings designed other major buildings in Troy, including the National State Bank Building, Troy Times Building, Troy City Hall, Troy High School, Troy Courthouse, Rensselaer County Courthouse, and Mount Ida Presbyterian Church.
