= Troy Waste Manufacturing Company Building =

- U.S. National Register of Historic Places
- Location within New York Location within the United States
- Location: 444 River St., Troy, New York
- Coordinates: 42°44′11″N 73°41′21″W
- Area: 0.46 acres (0.19 ha)
- Built: c. 1908
- Architect: M. F. Cummings & Son
- Architectural style: Classical Revival
- MPS: Textile Factory Buildings in Troy, New York, 1880-1920 MPS
- NRHP reference No.: 14000008
- Added to NRHP: February 14, 2014

Troy Waste Manufacturing Company Building, also known as the McCarthy Building, is a historic textile factory located at Troy, Rensselaer County, New York. It was built about 1908, and is a five-story, triangular shaped brick building with a flat roof and high basement. It features a tall square stair tower, formal entranceway, and Classical Revival style terra cotta ornamentation.

It was listed on the National Register of Historic Places in 2014.
