= Kayaderossera patent =

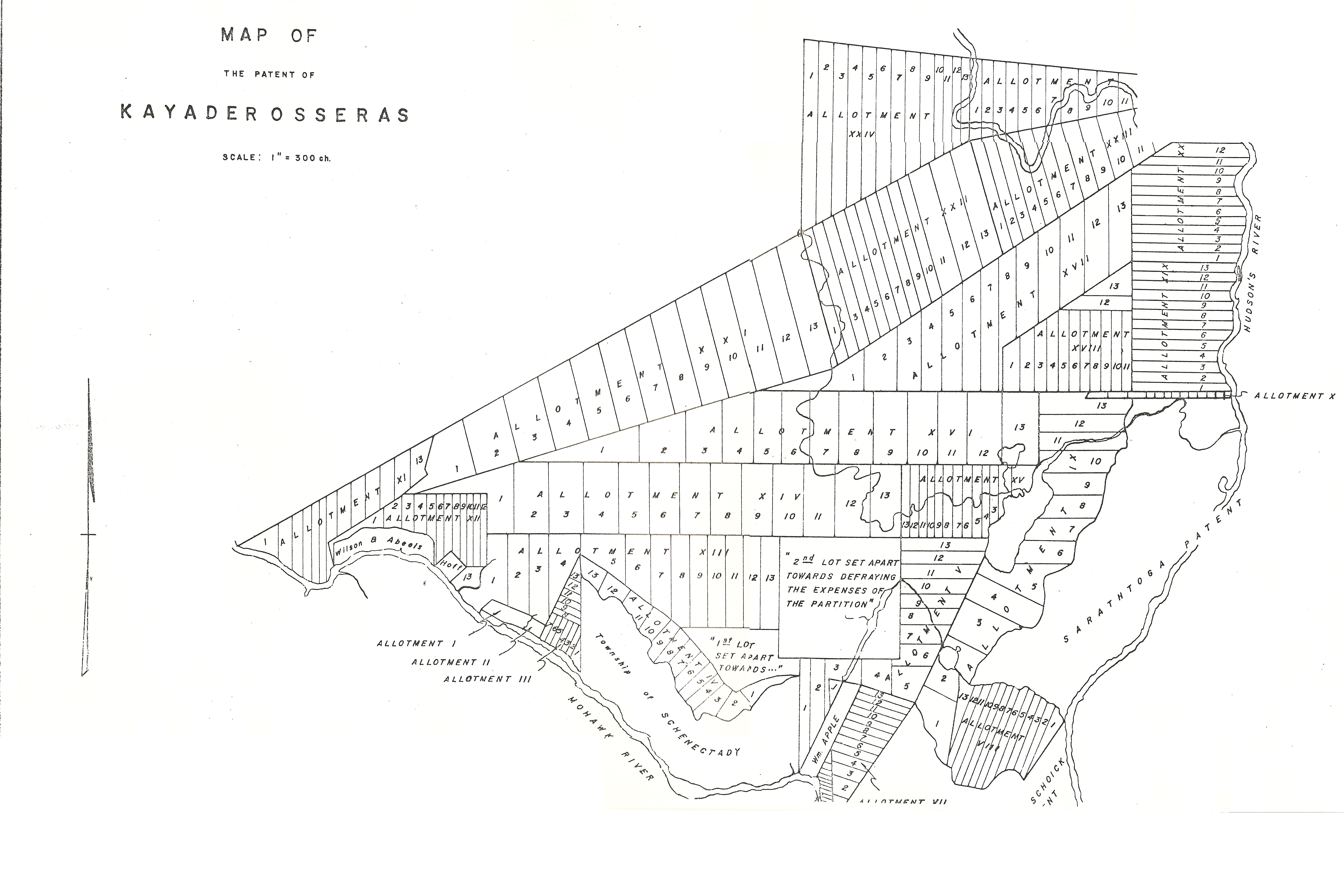
Original survey may of the Kayaderosseras Patent

The Kayaderossera Patent (or Kayaderosseras Patent) was a grant of land made by Anne, Queen of Great Britain in 1701 to thirteen subjects. The patent included 406,000 acres (164,000 ha) comprising most of what is now Saratoga County and parts of Montgomery, Schenectady, and Fulton Counties.

The grantees were Nanning Hermance (or Hermanse, also called Nanning Visscher), Johannes Beekman, Rip Van Dam, Anne Bridges, Johannes Fisher, John Tudor, Javis Hooglandt, John Stephens, John Latham, and Stephen Broughton.

Negotiations with the Mohawks and the French and Indian War delayed the process, and the lands were not surveyed until 1771. The surveyors divided the patent into twenty five allotments, and each allotment was subdivided into thirteen lots of approximately equal size. The grantees "drew lots" to determine ownership of individual lots within each allotment.

== Precedents ==
The Kayaderossera Patent was the largest of a series of such grants in the seventeenth and early eighteenth centuries. The Van Schaick Patent granted all of the current town of Waterford and a large section of Half Moon to Anthony Van Schaick in 1687. The Appel Patent in 1708 granted land north of the Mohawk River extending back a distance of three miles to William Appel. The Saratoga Patent granted land bordering the Van Schaick Patent north along the Hudson River to Colonel Peter Schuyler, Robert Livingston, and others.

== Land purchase ==
Prior to issuing a patent the colonial government required evidence that the land had been legally purchased from its native owners. Samuel Broughton negotiated an agreement with the Mohawks, represented by the sachems Joseph, Hendrick, and Cornelius, apparently representatives of the three clans. In 1702 when the deed was actually signed, however, Cornelius failed to appear and two other representatives signed in his stead. This later formed the basis of litigation by the Mohawks contesting the patent. The legalities were finally settled in 1761 with a negotiated settlement.

Nineteenth century histories identified Joseph as Ter-jen-nin-ho-ge and Hendrick as De-han-och-rak-has More recently Hindraker, Snow. and Sivertsen have identified Hendrick as Tejonihokarawa (Tay yon’ a ho ga rau’ a) representing the Wolf Clan. Hindraker and Sivertsen identify Joseph as Dehanochrakhas of the Bear Clan, and Sivertsen identifies Cornelius or Cornelis as Tirogaren representing the Turtle Clan.

The patent signed by Governor Cornbury in 1708 originally comprised 800,000 acres (320,000 ha).

== Survey ==
In 1762 Christopher Yates and John Glen of Schenectady, and Thomas Palmer of Orange County were appointed to conduct the survey of the patent. The surveyor Charles Webb performed the actual survey, which was completed and filed on December 18, 1770. As of 2012 many deeds in Saratoga County still include a phrase such as "part of Lot 3 in the subdiv of Lot One in the Eighteenth general allotment in the Patent of Kayadesessera" at the beginning of their property descriptions.
