= Clinton County Courthouse Complex =

- U.S. National Register of Historic Places
- New York State Register of Historic Places
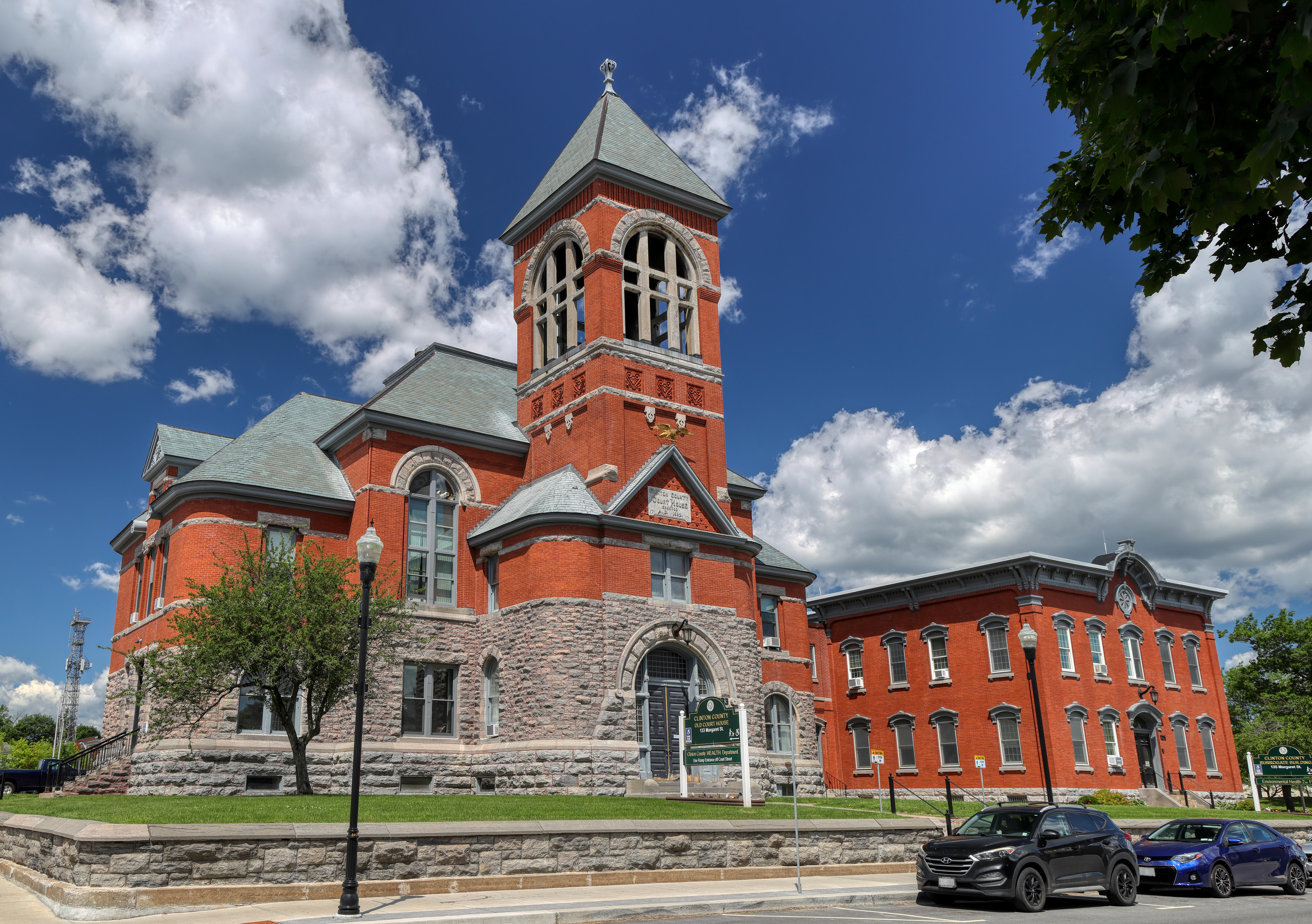

- Location within New York Location within the United States
- Interactive map showing the location of Clinton County Courthouse Complex
- Location: 135 Margaret St., Plattsburgh, New York
- Coordinates: 44°41′56″N 73°27′13″W
- Area: 2 acres (0.81 ha)
- Built: 1884-1885, 1889
- Built by: Brown Bros.
- Architect: Cummings, M.F.
- Architectural style: Italianate, Romanesque
- MPS: Plattsburgh City MRA
- NRHP reference No.: 82001101
- NYSRHP No.: 01940.000238

Significant dates
- Added to NRHP: November 12, 1982
- Designated NYSRHP: November 12, 1982

The Clinton County Courthouse Complex is a historic county government and courthouse site located at 135 Margaret Street in Plattsburgh, Clinton County, New York. The main courthouse was constructed in 1889. It is a two-story, ashlar stone and brick Richardsonian Romanesque style building. It has a hipped roof and rock-faced arched openings. It features a large, square central tower with an open campanile and pyramidal roof. The associated Surrogate's Building was built in 1884–1885, and is a two-story, Italianate style brick building with a bracketed cornice with Renaissance style detail.

The courthouse complex was added to the National Register of Historic Places on November 12, 1982.

== See also ==
- List of Registered Historic Places in Clinton County, New York
