= Ballston Spa, New York =

Ballston Spa
- Village
- Village of Ballston Spa
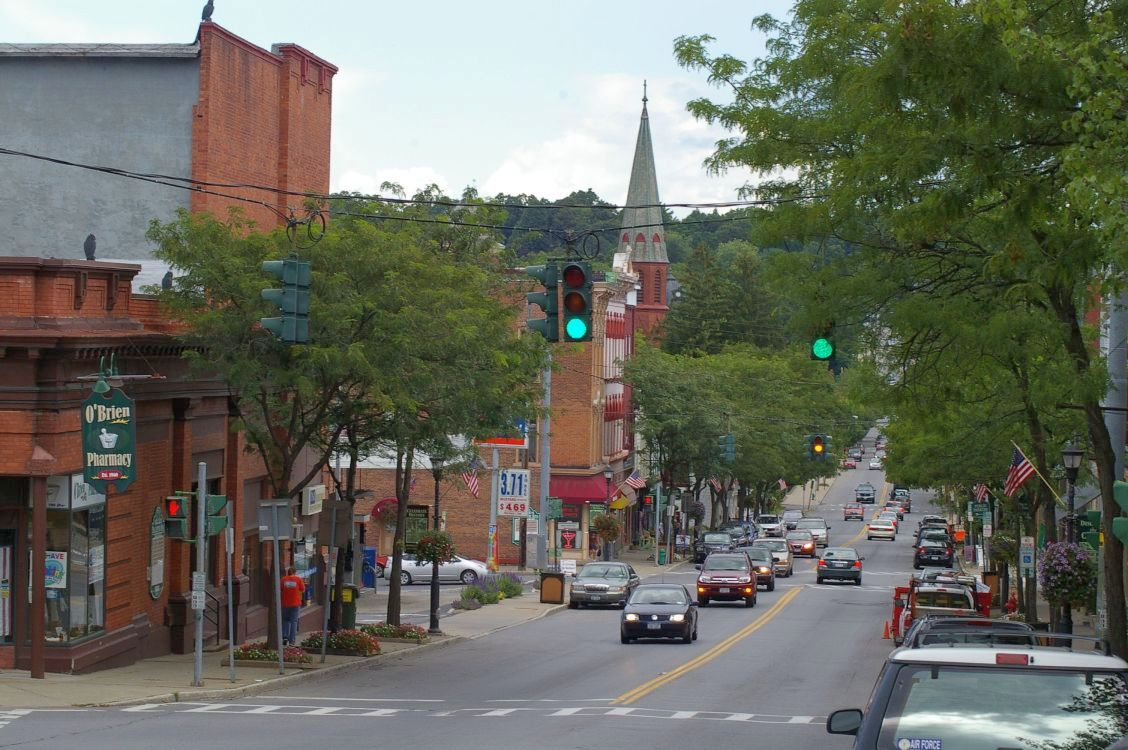
- Milton Avenue in Ballston Spa
- Motto: A Village of Friends
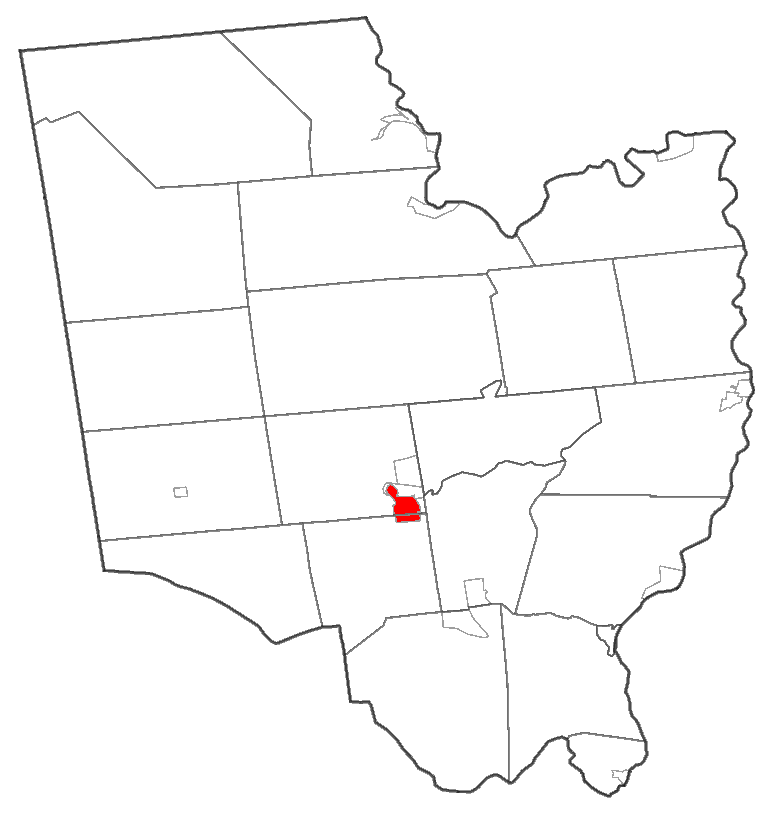
- Location within Saratoga County

- Location in the State of New York Location in the United States
- Coordinates: 43°0′26″N 73°51′4″W
- Country: United States
- State: New York
- County: Saratoga
- Settled: 1771
- Village: 1807
- Named for: Eliphalet Ball

Area
  - Total: 1.61 sq mi (4.17 km^{2})
  - Land: 1.60 sq mi (4.15 km^{2})
  - Water: 0.0077 sq mi (0.02 km^{2})
- Elevation: 315 ft (96 m)

Population (2020)
  - Total: 5,111
  - Density: 3,193.3/sq mi (1,232.93/km^{2})
- Time zone: UTC-5 (Eastern (EST))
  - Summer (DST): UTC-4 (EDT)
- ZIP code: 12020
- Area codes: 518
- FIPS code: 36-04253
- GNIS feature ID: 0969840
- Website: Village of Ballston Spa

Ballston Spa is a village in and the county seat of Saratoga County, New York, United States, located southwest of Saratoga Springs. It is part of the Capital Region. The population of the village, named after Rev. Eliphalet Ball, a Congregationalist clergyman and an early settler, was 5,111 at the 2020 census. Ballston Spa lies on the border of two towns, situated partly in the Town of Ballston and partly in the Town of Milton. The Ballston Spa School District encompassing most of the combined towns of Milton, Malta, and Ballston is often referred to locally as ‘Ballston Spa’ with the village proper being referred to as ‘The Village’ or 'Town'.

== History ==
The village was first settled in 1771. In 1787, Benajah Douglas, grandfather of 1860 presidential candidate Stephen A. Douglas, built the first tavern and hotel at Ballston Spa. It was located near the natural spring.

In 1803, Ballston Spa's Sans Souci Hotel, at the time the largest hotel in the United States, was built by Nicholas Low. Presidents, Vice Presidents, Senators and Governors stayed there, as well as many wealthy private citizens. Ballston Spa was incorporated as a village in 1807.

At different times, the village was served by four railroads: the Delaware and Hudson Railway, the Ballston Terminal Railroad, the Schenectady Railway Company, and the Hudson Valley Railway.

The village was famous for its mineral water spring used for healing in sanatoria, including the Hawthorne and Lithia springs.

The effervescent water, tonic, and cathartic from this city is also known as Ballston Spa. The liquid contains common salt and carbonates of magnesium and calcium.

=== Movies, music and books ===
Portions of the novel The Last of the Mohicans were written by James Fenimore Cooper in the present day Brookside Museum and inspired by the local landscape.

Buster Red, a Depression era folk singer, wrote in his song "When I Go Out" details about his trip through Pennsylvania and New York. According to the song it was in Ballston Spa that he was ultimately found out for some crime or deception, before moving on to Saratoga.

The village was the model for the village of North Bath, NY, the setting for the 1993 best-selling novel and 1994 movie, Nobody's Fool. The book's author, Richard Russo, is a native of nearby Gloversville. It was also the location of the fictional "Elspeth Hatch" murder trial defended by Clarence Darrow set in 1897 in the book titled The Angel of Darkness by author Caleb Carr.

Several scenes in Sydney Pollack's 1973 film The Way We Were were filmed on Ballston Spa's Front Street. Scenes from The Horse Whisperer (1998) were also filmed in the village.

Since 2008 Ballston Spa has been home to the Ballston Spa Film Festival of short films from around the globe.

Ballston Spa was also mentioned in the 1963 novel The Tulip Tree by Howard Rigsby.

=== Museums ===
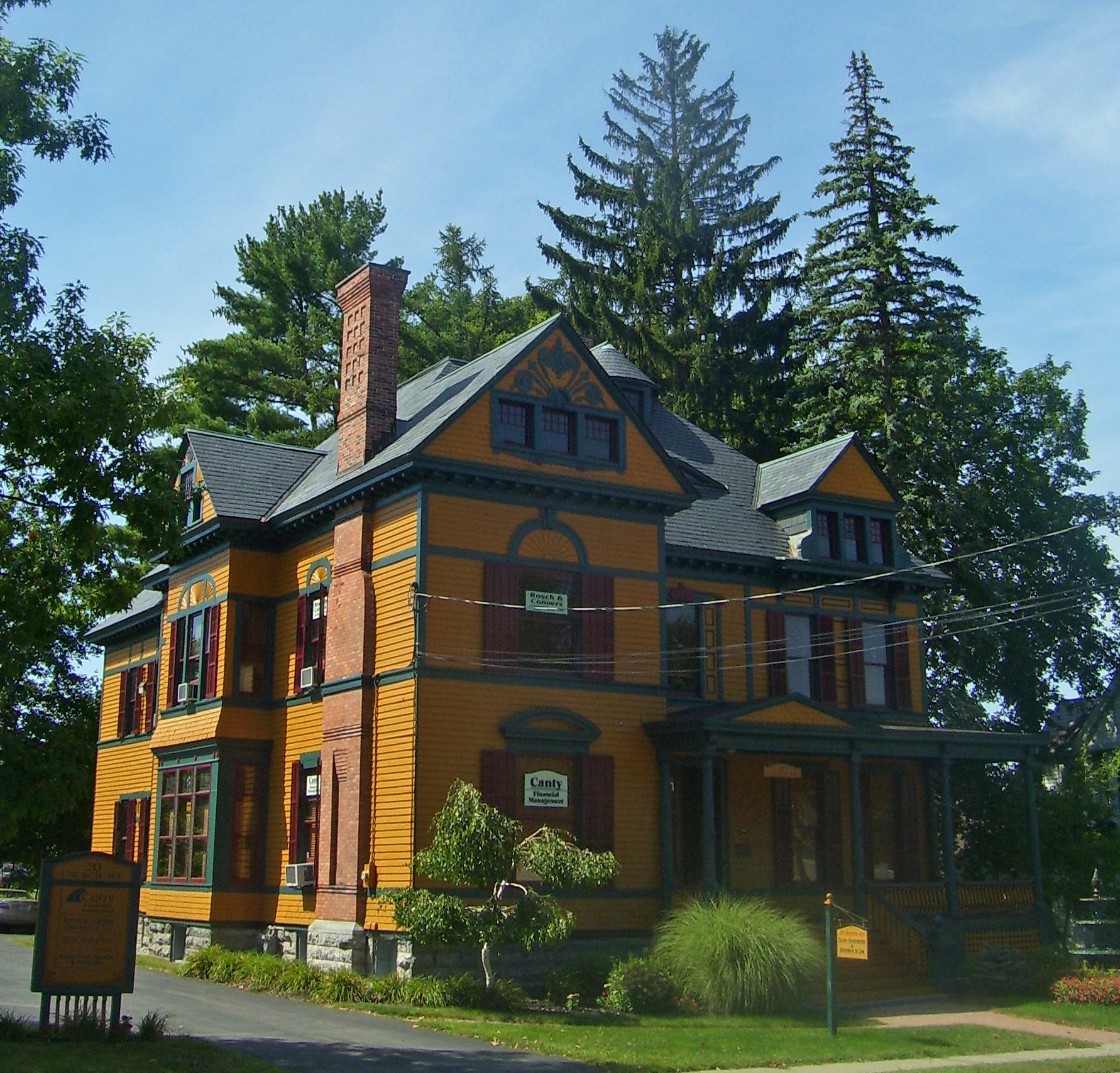
The historic Verbeck House.

Ballston Spa is home to the National Bottle Museum. It is also home to Brookside Museum, Saratoga County Historical Society.

The Brookside Museum, United States Post Office, Union Mill Complex, and Verbeck House are listed on the National Register of Historic Places.

=== Industry ===
In 1838 the Ballston Spa National Bank, one of the oldest still functioning American banks, was founded. As of 2022, the Bank has 13 branches.

George West (known as the "Paper Bag King") developed a line of square-bottomed paper bags, which he manufactured by the millions after the American Civil War, and at one time owned almost a dozen paper mills located along the Kayaderosseras Creek. The village was also home to the Ballston Knitting Company from 1918 to 1994.

As the county seat of Saratoga County, county offices, courts, law enforcement, and the jail are major employers.

=== Government ===
Recent mayors of Ballston Spa:

- Frank Rossi, II (Jr.) (2022–present)
- Christine Fitzpatrick (2021–2022)
- Larry Woolbright (2019–2021)
- John Romano (1995–2019)
- James Capasso Jr. (1991–95)
- Bert Grandin (1983–91)
- James Capasso Sr. (1971–83)

== Notable people ==
- Stephen Steele Barlow, Attorney General of Wisconsin.
- Scott Cherry, former North Carolina Tar Heels player, High Point Panthers coach
- Dick Doheny, racing driver
- Abner Doubleday, American Civil War hero and was born in Ballston Spa. The house he was born in is designated as a New York State landmark. Doubleday is buried in Arlington Cemetery in Virginia. The claim that Doubleday invented baseball was debunked years ago, but still is stated on his landmark sign at his place of birth.
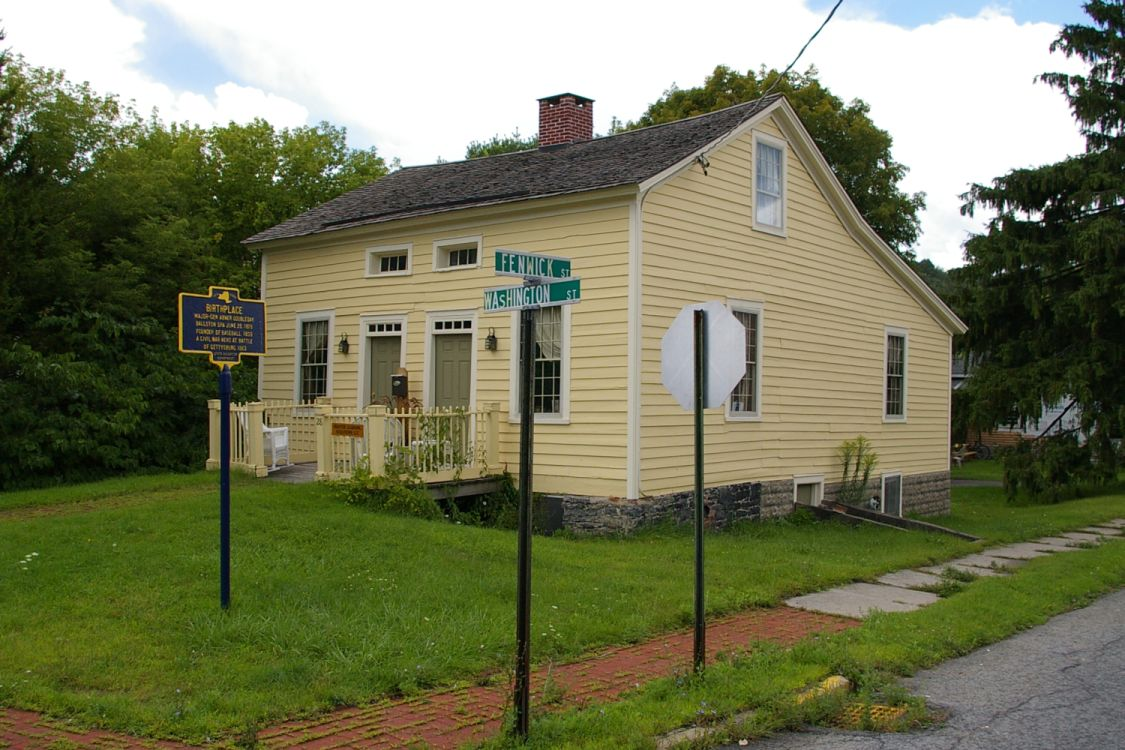
  Birthplace of Abner Doubleday
- General James Gordon, a veteran of the American Revolution, lived in Ballston Spa. Gordon Creek is named after him.
- Trevor Marsicano, Olympic short-course speedskater, winning a silver medal in the Team Pursuit at the 2010 Games.
- Ed Pompa, racing driver
- Frances Shimer (1826–1901), founder and first president of Shimer College.
- Ebby Thacher, Bill Wilson's (co-founder of Alcoholics Anonymous) sponsor.
- Ira Thomas (1881–1958), Major League Baseball player was born in Ballston Spa
- Stephen Trombley, Emmy Award-winning film maker, author and musician, is a 1972 graduate of Ballston Spa High School.
- Todd Waring, television and movie actor, 1973 graduate of Ballston Spa High School.
- George West acquired ten paper mills situated along the Kayaderosseras Creek from 1862 to 1899 and became the largest manila paper manufacturer in the world. Also was a member of the New York State Assembly and the United States Congress.
- Riley Walz, software engineer and internet artist

== Geography ==
Ballston Spa is located at 43°0′26″N 73°51′4″W (43.007185, -73.851168).

According to the United States Census Bureau, the village has a total area of 1.6 square miles (4.1 km^{2}), of which 1.6 square miles (4.1 km^{2}) is land and 0.62% is water.

New York State Route 50 (Milton Avenue), a north-south highway, passes through the village and intersects New York State Route 67 (West High Street). County Road 63 (Malta Avenue) leaves the village to the east, connecting it to U.S. Route 9 and Interstate 87 (The Northway).

== Demographics ==
Historical population
Census	Pop.	Note	%±
1810	500		—
1840	1,500		—
1850	2,000		33.3%
1860	2,285		14.3%
1870	2,970		30.0%
1880	3,011		1.4%
1890	3,527		17.1%
1900	3,923		11.2%
1910	4,138		5.5%
1920	4,103		−0.8%
1930	4,591		11.9%
1940	4,434		−3.4%
1950	4,937		11.3%
1960	4,991		1.1%
1970	4,968		−0.5%
1980	4,711		−5.2%
1990	4,937		4.8%
2000	5,556		12.5%
2010	5,409		−2.6%
2020	5,111		−5.5%
U.S. Decennial Census

=== 2020 census ===
As of the 2020 census, Ballston Spa had a population of 5,111. The median age was 42.0 years. 19.2% of residents were under the age of 18 and 18.9% of residents were 65 years of age or older. For every 100 females there were 96.1 males, and for every 100 females age 18 and over there were 94.2 males age 18 and over.

100.0% of residents lived in urban areas, while 0.0% lived in rural areas.

There were 2,317 households in Ballston Spa, of which 25.0% had children under the age of 18 living in them. Of all households, 36.5% were married-couple households, 21.8% were households with a male householder and no spouse or partner present, and 31.5% were households with a female householder and no spouse or partner present. About 38.8% of all households were made up of individuals and 15.3% had someone living alone who was 65 years of age or older.

There were 2,480 housing units, of which 6.6% were vacant. The homeowner vacancy rate was 2.3% and the rental vacancy rate was 5.4%.

Racial composition as of the 2020 census
Race	
White	94.0%
Black or African American	1.0%
American Indian and Alaska Native	0.2%
Asian	1.0%
Native Hawaiian and Other Pacific Islander	0.1%
Some other race	2.0%
Two or more races	0.7%
Hispanic or Latino (of any race)	5.6%

=== 2000 census ===
As of the 2000 census, there were 5,556 people in the village. The population density was 3,464.8 inhabitants per square mile (1,337.8/km^{2}). There were 2,398 housing units at an average density of 1,495.4 per square mile (577.4/km^{2}). The racial makeup of the village was 96.33% White, 1.17% African American, 0.16% Native American, 0.52% Asian, 0.61% from other races, and 1.21% from two or more races. Hispanic or Latino of any race were 1.94% of the population.

Of the 2,267 households, 32.4% had children under the age of 18 living with them, 45.9% were married couples living together, 10.8% had a female householder with no husband present, and 38.9% were non-families. 32.1% of all households were made up of individuals, and 11.6% had someone living alone who was 65 years of age or older. The average household size was 2.32 and the average family size was 2.94.

In the village, the population was spread out, with 23.9% under the age of 18, 8.1% from 18 to 24, 32.7% from 25 to 44, 18.7% from 45 to 64, and 16.6% who were 65 years of age or older. The median age was 36 years. For every 100 females, there were 88.2 males. For every 100 females age 18 and over, there were 85.2 males.

=== Income and poverty ===
The median income for a household in the village was $37,173, and the median income for a family was $49,387. Males had a median income of $36,929 versus $27,281 for females. The per capita income for the village was $20,237. About 7.4% of families and 10.6% of the population were below the poverty line, including 16.8% of those under age 18 and 5.1% of those age 65 or over.

== Schools ==
=== Public schools ===
- Milton Terrace South (closed summer 2013)
- Milton Terrace Elementary School
- Wood Road Elementary School
- Malta Avenue Elementary School (Ballston Spa High School, 1900–1957)
- Ballston Spa Middle School (Ballston Spa High School, 1957–1998)
- Ballston Spa High School
- Gordon Creek Elementary School (Opened 2013) (Replacing Milton Terrace South)

Before the 2008-2009 school year, the arrangement of public schools was as follows:

- Milton Terrace Primary School
- Wood Road Intermediate School
- Malta Avenue Intermediate School
- Ballston Spa Middle School
- Ballston Spa High School

=== Non-public schools ===
- St. Mary's is a Catholic school located in Ballston Spa, providing students with a Catholic education from preschool through 5th grade.
- Spa Christian School is a small, private, non-denominational Christian school for children Pre-K to 6th grade.
- The Church Mouse is a Christian preschool and pre-K.

== Climate ==
This climatic region is typified by large seasonal temperature differences, with warm to hot (and often humid) summers and cold (sometimes severely cold) winters. According to the Köppen Climate Classification system, Ballston Spa has a humid continental climate, abbreviated "Dfb" on climate maps.

== Bibliography ==
- Grose, Edward F. (1907). Centennial History of Ballston Spa 1763-1907. Troy, NY: E. H. Lisk. "A Souvenir of the Centennial Celebration Held June 22–25, 1907"
