= National State Bank Building =

- U.S. National Register of Historic Places
- U.S. Historic district – Contributing property
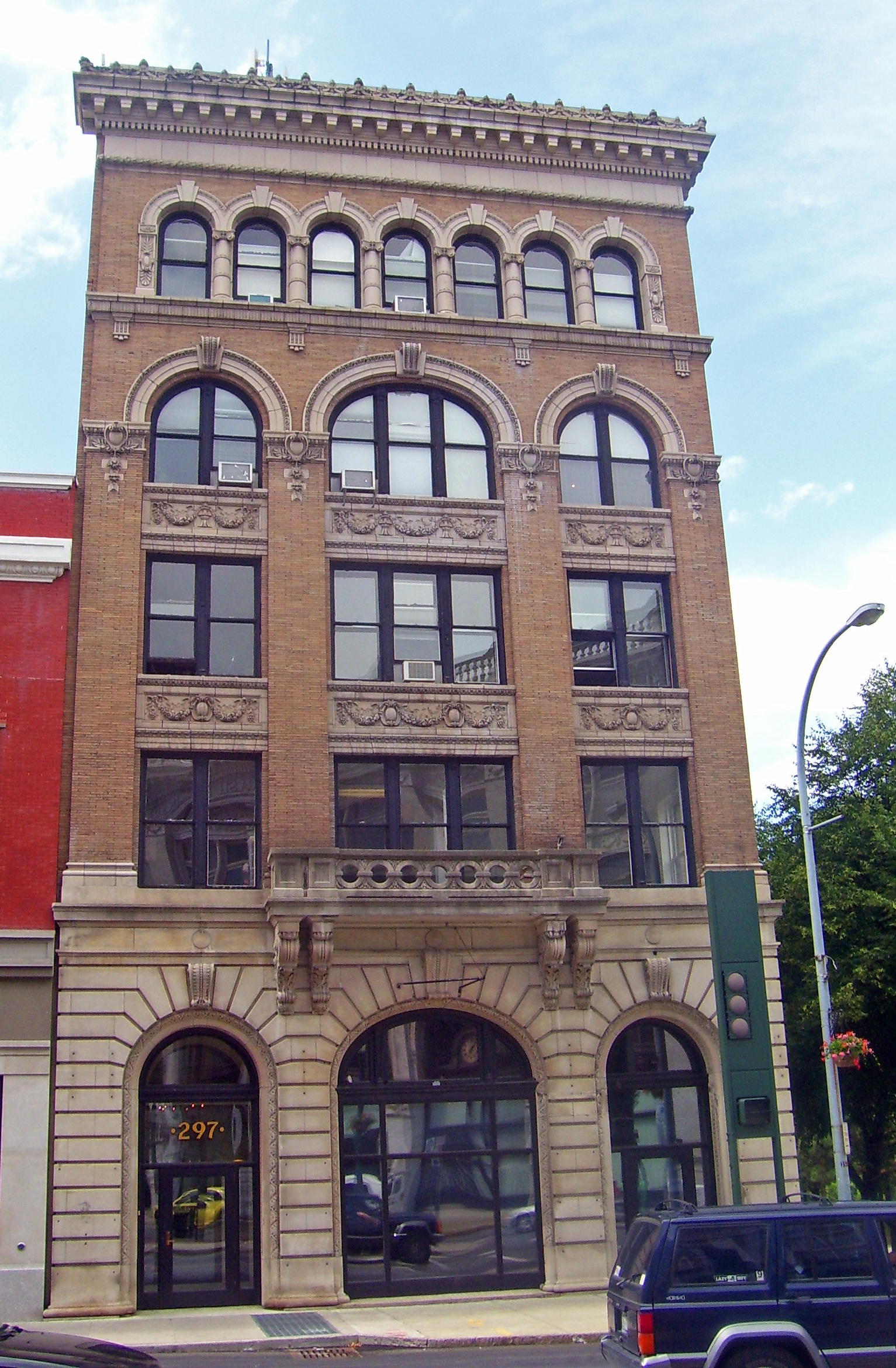
- Front (east) elevation, 2008
- Location: Troy, NY
- Coordinates: 42°43′57″N 73°41′25″W
- Built: 1904
- Architect: M. F. Cummings & Son
- Architectural style: Beaux Arts
- Part of: Central Troy Historic District (ID86001527)
- NRHP reference No.: 70000431

Significant dates
- Added to NRHP: December 29, 1970
- Designated CP: August 13, 1986

The National State Bank Building is located on River Street in Troy, New York, United States, at its junction with Fulton and Third (southbound US 4) streets. It was listed on the National Register of Historic Places in 1970, one of the earliest buildings in the city so recognized. Since 1986 it has been a contributing property to the Central Troy Historic District.

It was built in 1904, on the site of a public market that had burned down the year before, by local architects M. F. Cummings & Son in the Beaux Arts architectural style. Five stories high, three bays wide by nine deep, its fenestration is similar to the larger Ilium Building a block to the east. The first story is faced in rusticated stone, the second through fifth in light gold brick with stone and terra cotta trim, and with carved stone panels beneath the third and fourth floor windows. These three distinct zones, along with the building's steel frame construction and use of an elevator inside, show the influence of early skyscraper design.
