= History of Lansingburgh, New York =

This is a history of Lansingburgh, New York.

== Overview ==
The town of Lansingburgh was originally intended as the site for the principal city north of Albany on the east bank of the Hudson River; but the inhabitants of the settlement a mile or two south of New City (not to be confused with New City, a different city in New York known today by that name), as the village of Lansingburgh was first known, took advantage of the opportunities which presented themselves in rapid succession, and the prestige which in the natural order of things should have gone to Lansingburgh went to Troy, which rapidly outran its rival in the race for commercial supremacy in Rensselaer County.

The town of Lansingburgh is located on the western border of the county, north of the city of Troy and south of the town of Schaghticoke. On the east lie the towns of Pittstown and Brunswick and on the west the Hudson River, separating Lansingburgh from the northern part of Albany county and the southern part of Saratoga county. The site of the county was originally included in parts of two separate patents. The northern part of the town as at present constituted was set off from Schaghticoke in 1819 and forms a part of the Schaghticóke tract, occupied by the Schaghticoke Indians and set off to them in 1670. This territory afterward became the property of the city of Albany and was sold in 1707 to the Knickerbocker colony. The southern part of the town formed a part of the Stone Arabia patent.

== Early history ==
Soon after the Dutch began to make settlements in the vicinity of what is now Troy, Robert Saunders, a resident of Albany, was attracted to the level and fertile tract now in the town of Lansingburgh, and called by the Indians Tascamcatick, and the woodland to the south called Passquassick. September 1, 1670, Francis Lovelace, governor of the province of New York, granted the former tract to Saunders. March 22, 1679, Sir Edmund Andros, another governor, granted to Saunders the woodland, together with the small island in the Hudson called Whale island, since submerged by the construction of the State dam south of it. September 19, 1681, Saunders sold part of the woodland south of Piscawen kill to Peter Van Woggelum. May 26, 1683, Saunders sold the remaining portion of his patent, Tascamcatick, to Joannes Wendell, and the latter afterward purchased another piece of woodland which extended northward along the river to a creek called by the Indians Paensick kill. Wendell's land was confirmed to him July 22, 1686, by a patent granted by Governor Thomas Dongan and called Steene (Stony) Arabia patent, and for over a century the territory was known as Stone Arabia. June 21, 1763, Robert Wendell, a descendant and heir of Joannes Wendell, sold to Abraham Jacob Lansing, for 300 pounds, that portion of his property beginning opposite the middle branch of the Mohawk River and running thence eastward as far as the limits of the Stone Arabia patent, excepting that portion which had been sold to Simon Van Antwerp but then owned by William Rogers. A deed given by Stephen Van Rensselaer (one of the patroons) to Abraham Jacob Lansing, dated July 13, 1769, described the north bounds of the Manor of Rensselaerswyck and the south bounds of the Stone Arabia patent.

The number of settlers increased rapidly and Lansing, believing that his property would soon form the site of a thriving village, in 1771 had a portion of it surveyed and laid out into lots, with streets and alleys, by Joseph Blanchard, which he called Lansingburgh. The map showed 288 lots, and the ground it covered included that bounded by North, East and South streets and the Hudson River.

On January 1, 1771, the inhabitants of the settlement agreed upon a compact called the "Proposals," for the government of the community, and chose civil officers. It was provided that there be annually elected a committee of five persons, a "town clerk, a path-master, and three Fence Viewers, "and that Abraham Jacob Lansing, or his heirs forever, should be one of the committee; At the first town meeting Ebenezer Marvin was elected moderator and Thomas S. Diamond clerk. The first committee comprised Abraham Jacob Lansing, Isaac Bogart, John Barber, Ebenezer Marvin, and Benjamin French. Abraham Wendell was chosen pathmaster, and Robert Wendell, Levinus Lansing, and Isaac Van Arnum fenceviewers.

The advantageous location of the new "City of Lansingburgh" attracted many persons from other localities, particularly from New England, and the embryo village grew rapidly. Small manufacturing establishments were started and mercantile and commercial houses were founded at a rate that gave great promise. In 1774 a school was founded by Maus R. Van Vranka, who also agreed to read one English and one Dutch - sermon on every Sunday in the' year, excepting four Sundays reserved for himself.

== 1775–1800 ==
When the inhabitants of Lansingburgh became aware of the fact that the relations between the American colonists and Great Britain had become strained almost to the point of rupture, they showed their patriotism by subscribing to a paper which read as follows, dated June 15, 1775: A General Association agreed to and subscribed by the Freemen Freeholders and Inhabitants of Lansingburgh and Patent of Stone Arabia.

That these men meant all that they said and promised is evidenced in the fact that, with very few exceptions, their names are found enrolled upon the following lists of militia maintained during the War of the Revolution. Some of the names are those of persons then residing outside the bounds of the town, but there is no record distinguishing them from residents of Lansingburgh.

The first Masonic lodge in Lansingburgh was Hiram lodge No. 35, F. & A. M., which was instituted upon a warrant granted August 16, 1787.

The growth of New City, as Lansingburgh was commonly called in contradistinction to the Old City (Albany), and the development of its various industries were so great that May 21, 1787, "Claxton & Babcock in King street between Hoosick and South Streets," in answer to what they believed to be a demand for a local newspaper, brought out the first issue of the first newspaper published in Lansingburgh-the Northern Centinel and Lansingborough Advertiser. It was a weekly publication and the first newspaper printed within the limits of the territory now known as Rensselaer county. Strange as may seem, it did not contain a line of local news except the publishers' announcement to the public. Its contents consisted of several columns of European "news" three months old, a few brief items regarding events which had occurred nearly a month before in New York, Boston and Philadelphia, some miscellany and five advertisements. The publication at once became popular and circulated through a large territory north and east of Lansingburgh. The name "Lansingborough," which appeared in the caption of the paper, was an error of the printers, but was not changed to Lansingburgh for several months.

At the time of the establishment of the Centinel every inhabitant of Lansingburgh expected that the village was destined to become a large and prosperous city. New buildings were erected on all sides and the demand for residences and stores could not be supplied at times. Not infrequently persons who came here to locate were compelled to go elsewhere temporarily. The transportation business between this and other points had grown to large proportions, and sailing craft of all descriptions came up to the southern part of the village, where they deposited their burdens and departed with new cargoes.

The expectations of the founder of Lansingburgh were more than met in its rapid development. In 1790, so numerous had become the population and so varied the business interests of the community, that it was deemed advisable to establish a more substantial form of government than the "Proposals" first agreed to. Consequently, April 5, 1790, the State Legislature passed an act to appoint trustees to take and hold certain lands therein mentioned, and for other purposes.

Soon after a fire company was organized, and in 1791 the hand fire engine known as old No. 1 was purchased in Philadelphia.

Abraham Jacob Lansingh; founder of Lansingburgh, died October 9, 1791, in the seventy second year of his age. His wife, Catherine Lansing, died the day before in the sixty-ninth year of her age. In the notice of his death printed in the American Spy October 14 he is referred to as "the original proprietor of this town."

The "Scotch Seceders," as they styled themselves, built a church in 1789 or 1790 on the ground later occupied by the brush factory of J. G. McMurray & Co. The Rev. John Gausman was pastor, but the society died out after a brief career.

The first post-office in Lansingburgh was established in June 1792. Up that date letters for Lansingburgh were sent to Albany and there sent to their destination by a stage line operated by Annanias Platt upon the authority of the Legislature. Stephen Gorham was made deputy postmaster in April 1791. He was succeeded in the summer of 1792 by John Lovett, who became the first postmaster of Troy.

As early as June 18, 1782, Rev. Brandt Schuyler Lupton preached in Lansingburgh, but he did not become the pastor of a congregation until November 3, 1758, being ordained on the third Sunday of that month as pastor of the Reformed Protestant Dutch church. The first church edifice was erected on the north-west corner of Richard and John streets and was used as a house of worship until 1832. The congregation continued in existence until the close of the 18th century. August 9, 1792, the First Presbyterian church was organized and the cornerstone of the building subsequently used by the congregation as a house of worship was laid July 5, 1793, by Rev. Jonas Coe, pastor of the united congregations of Lansingburgh and Troy.1 The church was dedicated the following year. It was built on the north end of the village green and its walks were made of brick imported from Holland by Levinus Lansing, which he originally intended to use in the construction of a residence for himself.

The Lansingburgh library was opened September 9, 1794, with William Bell as librarian. The library was incorporated by an act of the Legislature February 24, 1795.

February 10, 1795, the Legislature passed a law providing for. the paving of certain streets. in Lansingburgh and appointing John D. Dickinson, James Dole, Jonas Morgan, Annanias Platt, Nicholas Schuyler, John Keating and Benjamin Tibbits commissioners to direct the work of improvement. The streets directed to be paved were King street, leading from what was called South street to Richard Street; North street, leading from Queen street to Water street; and Hoosick street, leading from Queen street to Water street.

The first water works in Lansingburgh of which any information is in existence were constructed prior to or during 1795. In December of that year water was supplied to all persons desiring it, from aqueducts constructed and maintained by Luther Emes & Co.

The Lansingburgh academy was chartered by the Regents of the University February 20, 1796, in response to a petition signed December 24, 1795, by influential residents of the village.

The law erecting the village of Lansingburgh was soon found to be incomplete, uncertain and restricted.

Provision was also made for the election of three assessors, a collector, treasurer and "as many fire wardens as the trustees for the time being or the major part thereof may order and direct." The duties of the village officers were carefully defined.

March 30, 1798, by act of the Legislature, Alexander I. Turner and Adonijah Skinner were given the exclusive right, for five years beginning May 1, 1798, to conduct a stage line between the village of Lansingburgh and the town of Hampton, Washington county, passing through the towns of Hebron, Salem and Granville.

The Lansingburgh Gazette made its initial appearance September 18, 1798, Gardiner Tracy being its first publisher. Before that time, in addition to the Northern Centinel and Lansingburgh Advertiser, the Federal Herald, the American Spy and the Northern Budget had been started.

== 1800–1810 ==
In the reports of cases adjudicated in the Supreme Court of Judicature of the State of New York is recorded the decision in the case of Van Rensselaer against Dole, a unique proceeding for damages on account of alleged slander. The decision in the case was handed down in April 1800, and since that time at least one lawsuit of a similar nature has been decided in favor of the defendant, the decision being based upon the law as laid down by the presiding judge in the case of Van Rensselaer against Dole. The opinion and decision in the case, being so unusual, are quoted:

Van Rensselaer against Dole. This was an action of slander. The declaration charging the defendant with speaking of the plaintiff and others, the following words: "John Keating is as damned a rascal as ever lived, and all who joined his party and the procession on the 4th of July, (meaning the said John Van Rensselaer and the party and procession, in which the said John Keating acted as captain on the said 4th of July) are a set of blackhearted highwaymen, robbers, and murderers." The words were differently charged, with some additional expressions, in the other counts, but were in substance the same. Plea the general issue.

The limits of the village of Lansingburgh were again defined by the Legislature April 2, 1801, as follows: Beginning at a point in the division line between the counties of Albany and Rensselaer, opposite the mouth of the creek on which John D. Van Der Heyden's mill now stands, from thence running on a line due east to the foot of the first range of hills, thence northerly on a line along the foot of the said first range of hills, until said line strikes the north bounds of the farm of Cornelius Lansing, and on which the said Cornelius Lansing now lives, thence westerly along the north bounds of said farm, to the division line between the counties of Rensselaer and Saratoga, thence along the westerly line of the said county of Rensselaer to the place of beginning.

By this law, or amended charter of Lansingburgh, the inhabitants of the village were accorded additional privileges and new duties were defined for them. Provision was made for new village ordinances relative to markets, streets, drainage, fire department, liquor license and many other matters, all of which were left in the hands of the new trustees.

The structure which spans the Hudson River between Lansingburgh and Waterford, Saratoga county, known as the Union bridge, is distinguished as being the oldest wooden bridge in the United States. It stands intact today as strong apparently as in the early days of the century. When the bridge was constructed it was deemed a marvel of engineering skill. How the public looked upon the structure at that time is manifested by the elaborate character of the exercises which attended its opening.

The day was a holiday in Lansingburgh. A "very numerous procession" was formed at noon at Johnson & Judson's hotel and marched to the bridge, and thence across to Waterford, "under the discharge of seventeen cannon," where a dinner had been provided at Van Schoonhoven's hotel at the expense of the stockholders of the bridge. Among the prominent persons in attendance were the governor, the secretary of state, the comptroller, "and a large number of respectable gentlemen from Albany and the adjacent villages," who "partook in much harmony and conviviality." The structure is 800 feet (240 m) long and thirty feet wide, comprising four arches, which are supported by three pillars and two abutments. It is owned by the Union Bridge company, of which Thomas A. Knickerbacker is president and John Knickerbacker treasurer.

As early as 1803 Rev. Laban Clark and Martin Ruter preached to Methodist congregations in Lansingburgh. Seven years later a house of worship was erected on the bank of the river at the foot of Elizabeth street and was occupied by the congregation until 1827. The church was regularly organized July 23, 1827, and February 15, 1828, the trustees of the society bought of Derick Lane the lot on the southwest corner of North and Queen streets, where a church was afterward erected. The first regular pastor was Rev. S. D. Ferguson.

The First Baptist society of Lansingburgh was organized June 11, 1803, and the first edifice was located on the corner of John and North streets.

== 1810–1850 ==
During the War of 1812 an artillery company, of which Reuben King was captain and Caleb Allen lieutenant, and which had been organized before that war, was sent to Ogdensburg, but was soon afterward sent home. When the draft was ordered for the 155th Regiment, in command of General Gilbert Eddy of Pittstown, one-fourth of the artillery company was required for service, but before the regiment had proceeded further than Granville hostilities had terminated and the regiment was dismissed. When Commodore Macdonough, the distinguished commander of the flotilla on Lake Champlain, visited Lansingburgh, April 8, 1815, on his way to New York, be was welcomed by a large concourse of citizens, headed by a committee, who presented to him a pair of handsome pitchers and a dozen goblets. The pitchers were inscribed on one side: "Commodore T. Macdonough, with an. inferior force, captured the British squadron on Lake Champlain September 11, 1814;" and on the other: "Presented by the citizens of Lansingburgh - to the Hero of Lake Champlain." The goblets were inscribed: "The citizens of Lansingburgh to Commodore Macdonough." The gift was acknowledged in a letter from Commodore Macdonough to the citizens' committee, consisting of James Hickok, David Smith, Elias Parmelee, John Topping, Elijah Janes, Gardiner Tracy, James Adams and James Reid.

The bank of Lansingburgh was incorporated March 19, 1813, beginning business at No; 531 State street, then King Street. The bank started with a capital of $200,000, of which $60,000 was paid in. Under the general banking law of 1838 reorganization was effected, and June 20, 1866, the name was changed to National Bank of Lansingburgh. March 9, 1869, it was changed back to a State bank and called- the Bank .of Lansingburgh. Its banking house was located on the northwest corner of State and Richard streets. After a career of sixty-four years the corporate existence of the Bank of Lansingburgh ceased March 19, 1877, its last president being Horace W. Day, vice-president Leonard J. Abbott, cashier Alexander Walsh, teller E. H. Leonard, and bookkeeper William C. Groesbeck.

In 1819 a portion of the town of Schaghticoke was annexed to Lansingburgh, which contains the hamlet of Speigletown, in the northeastern part of the town. This hamlet received its name from the Vanderspeigle families, early settlers of the southern part of the town of Schaghticoke.

Soon after Hiram lodge, F. & A. M., ceased to exist, in September, 1822, a dispensation was granted for the institution of Phoenix lodge, which was organized in the following year. A history of the lodge will be found in a separate chapter dealing with Masonry in Rensselaer' county.

The First Universalist church was organized December 15, 1832, but it was not until the summer of 1834 that a small wooden house of worship was erected on the southwest corner of John and North streets. The society ceased to exist after a career of a few years and its church edifice was sold to St. John's Roman Catholic congregation. This congregation was organized in 1840 or 1841 and the church was dedicated in 1844 by Bishop McCloskey. St. Augustine's Roman Catholic church, erected in 1864 on the east side of John Street between Elizabeth and Market streets, at a cost of $40,000, was dedicated May 6, 1866, by Bishop Conroy of Albany. Rev. Thomas Galberry, O. S. A., was the first pastor. St. Augustine Free Institute was established December 13, 1869, by Rev. Thomas Galberry, Edward A. Dailey, Michael J. Collins, Ellen Wood and Mary Sullivan at the corner of John and North streets. It was afterward placed in charge of the Sisters of St. Joseph and its name was changed to St. Augustine's Free Institute.

By changes made in the bounds of the town by act of the Legislature in 1838, that portion of the village known as Batestown became a part of the city of Troy.

Lansingburgh was visited by its first serious fire Sunday, July 9, 1843, when nearly two entire blocks in the central part of the village were destroyed. The fire originated about 4 P. M. in the stables of the Rensselaer house and spread with great rapidity. The fire companies of Troy, Cohoes and Waterford responded to the call for assistance and their presence doubtless prevented the flames from destroying the entire village. About twenty five buildings were totally destroyed and several others damaged. The burned area was located between State and Congress streets and Elizabeth and Grove streets. Two weeks later, Sunday evening, July 23, about 10.30 o'clock, fire which originated in Jacock's barn destroyed about twelve more buildings.

== 1850–1900 ==
The Rensselaer County bank was established January 1, 1853, with a capital stock of $200,000 by John S. Fake as president. It was converted into a national bank in June, 1865, but six years later it resumed its old title. It ceased to exist July 13, 1872.

The 30th Regiment, N. Y. State Vols., the history of which is contained in a preceding chapter, had its inception in Lansingburgh, the first full company for that regiment being organized in this village. It was mustered into the service of the United States as Company A, with Samuel King as captain, John H. Campbell as lieutenant and Francis Dargen as ensign. At the first battle of Bull Run Captain King, Ensign Dargen and five privates were killed. Lieutenant Campbell succeeded to the captaincy. The term of service of the company and the regiment was two years from June 6, 1861. Company K, 169th Regiment, was organized by Captain Daniel Ferguson and Second Lieutenant E. R. Smith. The former was killed at the explosion of the mine at Fort Fisher. Captain Samuel King was wounded at the 2nd battle of Bull Run, on August 30, 1862, and died the following day in Washington, D.C. (September 1, 1862). The term of service of the company was three years from October 6, 1862. Captain Charles S. Holmes and First Lieutenant Cornelius Kelleher were members of Company C, 192nd Regiment.

March 48, 1875, Justice Westbrook of the Supreme Court granted an order for the appointment of John P. Albertson as secretary of the Exchange Bank of Lansingburgh, and the following afternoon, with trucks and workmen, Isaac McConihe, president of the bank, with his counsel, John H. Colby, and Mr. Albertson, came to Lansingburgh from Troy and removed the safe, books, etc., loading them on the trucks and taking them to Mr. McConihe's office in Troy.

In 1882 Mrs. Deborah Powers, then ninety-three years of age, desired to devote a portion of her estate to the use of those who had been less fortunate, and she decided to found a home for aged women. April 10, 1883, she purchased the property now known as the Powers Home for Old Ladies, formerly called the Daniel Davenport homestead, which was remodeled and another story placed on both wings. The first inmate was received December 20, 1883. In 1884 the building was again enlarged. The grounds embrace a half block in the northern part of the village between Twenty-third and Twenty-fourth streets and Second and Third avenues.

On the morning of Wednesday, December 11, 1895, a small house on Second avenue, just below Sixth street, was burned, the flames causing the death of Mrs. Hannah Eglin Sliter and Mary Harris, the former a well-known resident of the village.

== Public institutions ==
When the public school system of the State was organized by the Legislature in 1807, Charles Selden and Thomas Wallace were chosen as the first school commissioners for Lansingburgh. Under the system of supervision by town superintendents in 1834, John G. Neal was elected to that office. In 1847 the Legislature passed an act permitting school district No. 1 of Lansingburgh to raise by taxation money enough, in addition to the public money, to establish a free school. This was one year before the free school system of the State was attempted by the Legislature, and four years before the fully developed system of 1851 was established. Prof. James C. Comstock was made principal of the new free school.

The Lansingburgh Academy is an old institution. The petition for its incorporation was signed December 24, 1795, by Benjamin Tibbits, William Bell and twenty-five others, and the charter was granted by the Regents February 20, 1796. The first building was erected on the site fronting the old "green," which is now the village park. It was of wood, and in it the school was maintained for twenty-five years. A new building was erected in 1820 on the north side of Fourteenth street near Fourth avenue. In that building the school has since been maintained, and under the charter of 1796. The first principal of the academy was Chauncey Lee. Among those who received their early education at this time-honored institution were Chester A. Arthur, afterwards president of the United States; Judge John K. Porter, Thomas G. Alvord, and many others.

The fire department of Lansingburgh was organized by act of the Legislature April 17, 1844, with Thomas C. Davenport as the chief engineer. This volunteer fire department came to an end December 9, 1874, when a paid department was organized in accordance with an act of the Legislature, the first chief engineer being Thomas H. Mason; first assistant, John Franklin; foreman of hose, William M. Lea; assistant foreman, Milford Osborne; superintendent of steamers, John Brooks; assistant superintendent and engineer, Frank Spotten.

Upon the failure of the Bank of Lansingburgh, the only one in the village, Albert E. Powers, son of Mrs. Deborah Powers, became its receiver. In order to facilitate the liquidation, the firm of D. Powers & Son opened a bank under the title of Bank of D. Powers & Sons, the other partner being Nathaniel B. Powers,. the other son of Deborah Powers. From March, 1877, until the death of Deborah Powers May 28, 1891, the mother and sons jointly conducted the bank in connection with their oilcloth factory.

The factory was established many years before by Deborah Powers and her husband, William Powers. The couple were married February 23, 1816, while Mr. Powers was teaching school in Lansingburgh. Having been successful in experiments in the manufacture of this product, Mr. Powers abandoned teaching in 1821 and devoted his time from that time on to this industry. Mrs. Powers was her husband's active helper in all his experiments, both in counsel and labor. In 1828, the building they occupied being too small for the accommodation of the work, the factory now standing on the west side of Second avenue was erected. In 1829 Mr. Powers lost his life while making varnish and Mrs. Powers was also severely burned in the same accident. But she bravely determined to carry on the business, which she did with great success to the day of her death, amassing a great fortune. In 1842 Albert E. Powers was admitted into the business as his mother's partner, and five years later Nathaniel B. Powers became a member of the firm, Jonathan E. Whipple, who had become a partner in 1832, retiring. After the death of Mrs. Powers both the oilcloth manufactory and the bank continued under the ownership of the two sons.

Since the failure of the Bank of Lansingburgh many years before no State or National incorporated banking institution had existed in Lansingburgh until 1888, when, October 19, it was decided by capitalists of the village to organize a bank with a capital stock of $68, 500, to be paid on February 12, 1889, with a limit of $250,000. Subsequently the capital stock was reduced to $50,000 and these officers were elected: President, J. K. P. Pine; vice-president, Robert C. Haskell; cashier, Edward Van Schoonhoven. The bank was named the People's Bank of Lansingburgh, and the lot No. 604 Second avenue was purchased for a site for a banking building, for $2,000. Ground was broken November 2, 1889, and the bank began business in the following February.

The Leonard hospital was incorporated in 1893, and the institution has since been under the direction of the State Board of Charities. The property was formerly owned by Mrs. Hugh L. Rose, who was a daughter of Dr. Leonard, and when she died she directed that the building should be devoted to the purposes of a hospital. Her wishes were fulfilled and the institution was named in honor of her father. It is located on the northeast corner of Fourteenth street and Sixth avenue, and the grounds surrounding it extend from Sixth to Seventh avenues and from Fourteenth to Fifteenth streets. The building is a two-story brick structure and well adapted to the purposes for which it is used.

== Churches ==
Reference has been made to the establishment of the First Presbyterian church. The second church edifice was commenced in 1844 and opened for service April 25, 1845. In 1866 and 1867 a commodious chapel was erected at a cost of $8,000, and since then the church has been enlarged and remodeled at a cost of $20,000. The work was completed in the summer of 1870 and the edifice, then practically a new one, was dedicated, the sermon being preached by the Rev. An son J. Upson, D. D.

The Methodist Episcopal church of Lansingburgh was organized July 23, 1827. The first house of worship was constructed at the foot of Elizabeth street near the river. A class had been formed as early as 1798, and in 1803 Rev. Laban Clark and Martin Ruter preached. In 1810 a house of worship was erected, and in 1828 and 1829 a church was built at the corner of North and Queen streets. Rev. S. D. Ferguson was the first stated pastor, though others had preceded him before the society became organized in due form. In 1848 a new church was built on the northeast corner of Elizabeth and Congress streets, which has been enlarged and remodeled. The society has always been a prosperous one.

The John Street Baptist church was organized June 11, 1803, and the first church edifice was on the east side, of State street between Hoosick and Lansing streets. September 6, 1804, the work of erecting a larger and more convenient church was begun on the northwest corner of Congress and Richard streets. This building subsequently became the property of the Second Presbyterian society and was known as Olivet .church. It later was given over to secular uses. The John Street Baptist church, having labored under heavy financial difficulties, was finally dissolved in 1857 and the church edifice was sold to satisfy a mortgage. The society was reorganized July 28, 1858, with A. B. Whipple as pastor. The edifice formerly occupied by the Second Presbyterian church on John street was purchased and improved, and soon after occupied.

The Second Presbyterian church, later named Olivet, was organized in 1835, as the First Free Presbyterian Society of Lansingburgh. Soon after organization had been effected a brick church was erected on the east side of John street, between Elizabeth and Richard streets. The first pastor was the Rev. Samuel P. Spear, and during his ministry the name of the organization was changed to that of the Second Presbyterian church of Lansingburgh. May 17, 1861, the congregation having been reorganized as Olivet church, it purchased the property formerly owned by the Baptist church, located on the northwest corner of Congress and Richard streets. In 1877 a chapel was erected on the northeast corner of Clinton and Congress streets.

Trinity Protestant Episcopal church was organized January 5, 1804, and the first house of worship was erected on the corner of Market and John streets. The first rector was the Rev. Dr. David Butler, who served St. Paul's at Troy at the same time. The church was destroyed by fire on Christmas morning, 1868, but was rebuilt almost immediately, being ready for occupancy within two years. The new edifice cost about $60,000.

The Reformed Presbyterian church of Troy and Lansingburgh was incorporated December 21, 1831, but in the following year sold its property and disbanded.

The Universalist church was organized in 1833, its edifice being located on the corner of North and John streets and its first pastor being the Rev. Charles Woodhouse. The society did not prosper and ultimately sold its property to St. John's Roman Catholic church and went out of existence.

St. John's church was the first Roman Catholic church to be established in Lansingburgh. Its first house of worship was the building purchased of the Universalist society, located on the corner- of North and John streets, which, after being repaired, was consecrated by Bishop McCloskey in 1844 as "The Catholic Church of the Village of Lansingburgh." The first pastor was the Rev. W. P. Hogan. For a while it was known as St. Joseph's church. The new church was built in 1864 and given the name of St. Augustine's.

The African Methodist Episcopal church was incorporated May 18, 1846, and after a career of twenty-five years it ceased to exist. The society maintained services at No. 549 Whipple avenue.

The Free Methodist church was established in 1866 and its house of worship on Ann street, south of Elizabeth, was dedicated November 15, 1867. The first pastor was the Rev. George E. Ferrin.

The Germondville Union church of North Lansingburgh, incorporated July 23, 1844, occupied during its career the house of worship afterwards owned by the Methodist church at Speigletown.

The English Evangelical Lutheran church of the Redeemer started with four persons, John Knudsen and wife and John H. Lingenfelter and wife. During the summer of 1889 Paul Klingler, a student in the Lutheran Theological seminary at Philadelphia, Pa., spent his vacation in an effort to gather together the anglicized Lutherans living in Lansingburgh, and succeeded in gathering fifty or sixty men, women and children. The time having arrived for Mr. Klinger to return to his studies in the seminary, the little flock was left without a shepherd. In the month of October Rev. Samuel G. Finckel came from Hartleton, Pa., to organize a congregation. In December about a score of members were incorporated, bought a lot and started a church, the cornerstone of which was laid about March 1, 1890. The building was completed and opened for service in May, 1890.

Among the other leading organizations in Lansingburgh, the Sans Souci Yacht club was organized October 12, 1867; the Lansingburgh Choral union was organized March 20, 1879.

== Industries ==
The population of Lansingburgh is composed largely of persons whose business is located in Troy, but the village sustains several manufacturing concerns which contribute greatly to its wealth and prosperity. Even while Troy was yet a comparatively small village Lansingburgh enjoyed an immense trade with Vermont and Northern New York in grain, beef, pork, butter, cheese and other produce. There were many commission merchants or "middle-men" in the village. In the beginning of the 19th century there were at least a dozen warehouses on River street for storing grain. Lansingburgh was then the centre of a great grain trade, buying of the farmers for many miles around and selling at Albany, New York and other cities. About 1825, and even before that date, there were several leather tanneries in operation in the village. Frederick Forsyth, Keating Rawson, Cornelius Lansing, Asa Burt and William Guest owned the most important of these. There were also a number of slaughter and packing houses, among them being those of Ives & Wilson, Tobias Loring, Noel Atwood and Thomas Turner. Before the year 1800 there were four or five "ship yards" in town, where sailing vessels for navigation on the Hudson were made. Armington & Hawkins and John Stilson were prominent in this line. The oilcloth industry has been a prominent one for many years. Reference to the factory of D. Powers's Sons has been made in preceding pages. P. C. Davenport, Jonathan E. Whipple and Ferrin engaged in the business at an early day. Caswell's rifle factory began business about 1812 or 1813. Twentyfive men were employed for many years in the three shops. Brush manufacturing was also an early industry, David McMurray being the pioneer in the business. All of his five sons-William, John G., Robert, David and Moses-were engaged in the same business. Large numbers of persons were employed in the various works for many years.

Edwin Chamberlain established a carriage factory in 1836, in Troy, removing to Lansingburgh in 1858. The business developed to large proportions and gave employment to a number of skilled workmen.

The Ludlow Valve Manufacturing company, which was located for many years in Lansingburgh, made preparations in 1896 to move to Troy and occupy a part of the former plant of the Troy Steel company in the southern part of the city. The plant was originally established in Waterford, but was removed to Lansingburgh in 1872, remaining in the village for twenty-four years. One of the earliest grist mills in town was started about 1785 or 1790 by Levetsee, near the Brunswick line. There were also several other grist mills and a number of lumber mills in town. Sherrill & Hedges had a nail factory in the village, and Fisher & Co. conducted a thread factory for a few years.

James McQuide began the manufacture of brushes about 1855, and eleven years later he erected a large brick building for use as a factory. Subsequently he admitted his son, Joseph McQuide, to the business under the firm name of James McQuide & Son. Sweney & Bradshaw began the manufacture of brushes in 1857. The firm afterward became Bradshaw & O'Bryan, and finally John G. O'Bryan became sole proprietor. The brush factory of George Scott was established in 1842. E. & C. Woods began the manufacture of brushes about 1843. The Rensselaer Valve works, now located in Cohoes, were founded in Lansingburgh in 1853 by P. Southwick. S. V. Arnold subsequently became interested in the business. In 1879 S. V. Arnold & E. L. Rowe came into possession, and not long afterward the energies of the proprietors were turned toward the manufacture of valves. The factory employs a large number of experienced workmen. Edward Tracy was the founder of the big malt house in Lansingburgh, said to be one of the largest in the country. Bilbrough's knitting mill, founded in Cohoes in 1854 as a cotton yarn factory, was removed to Lansingburgh about 1880. Cross & Hoyt established a brush factory in the village in 1833. Frederick M. Hoyt succeeded to the business in 1858. Milford L. Fancher established an insurance business about 1858. The Cold Spring ale brewery was founded early in the century by John Topping. A brush factory was started in 1874 by James Reed. About 1875 A. Faden began the manufacture of carriages and sleighs. Owen Denuin began the manufacture of brushes in 1874, and Curran & Barker entered the same line of business in 1875.

The greatest modern industry in Lansingburgh is that conducted by the United Shirt & Collar company. This concern was formed by the consolidation of the houses of James K. P. Pine, S. A. House's Sons, Sanford & Robinson, Beiermeister & Spicer and Marshall & Briggs, and was incorporated May 7, 1890, with a capital of $2,000,000. July 1 of that year it began business with these officers: President, Samuel B. Sanford; vice-presidents, Frederick Beiermeister, jr., David C. Briggs; treasurer, James K. P. Pine; secretary, Edward 0. House. The manufactories which comprise this giant concern had all been in business for several years, and the new corporation became at once one of the greatest in the world. The company started with three factories-one in Lansingburgh, located on the corner of Second avenue and Twenty-first street; the Anchor factory, at Nos. 509, 511 and 513 River street, Troy, and the factory on the corner of Fifth avenue and Broadway, Troy.

One of the largest manufacturing industries in Lansingburgh is that of S. Bolton's Sons, located on the west side of Second avenue in the Fourth ward. It is known as the Eagle brewery and is one of the most important ale and porter breweries of Northern New York. The firm now consists of Samuel Bolton, jr., and Joseph Bolton, brothers. Samuel Bolton, jr., is the business head while his brother attends to the practical end of the business. The establishment has gained a high reputation and its output is enormous. Employment is given to a large number of hands. Samuel Bolton, jr., is one of the prominent citizens of the village. He is interested in the banking business and his real estate holdings are large, the firm being among the largest taxpayers of the village. The business was established in 1865 by the father of the present members of the firm, who came from England. From a small beginning it has grown to its present proportions and produces for its owners large fortunes.
