= Herman Melville House =

Herman Melville House may refer to:

- Arrowhead (Herman Melville House), in Pittsfield, Massachusetts
- Herman Melville House (Troy, New York)
