= Colonel Greene =

Colonel Greene may refer to:

- Christopher Greene (1737–1781), American soldier
- William Cornell Greene (1851–1911), American soldier
- Frederick Stuart Greene (1870–1939), American soldier
