= Speigletown, New York =

Coordinates: 42°48′16″N 73°38′03″W

Speigletown is a hamlet within the town of Schaghticoke, New York in Rensselaer County, New York, United States.

It is located northeast of Troy on New York State Route 40, which is named Speigletown Road in that section. It is near the Hudson River, which is the border of Saratoga County. It shares ZIP code 12182 with Lansingburgh.

Its coordinates are 42° 48' 16" North, 73° 38' 5" West.

== History ==
The first permanent settlement began circa 1668. In May 1976, the land was surveyed and the original name of Dort was changed to Speigletown. Somehow, the spelling of Speigletown and VanDerSpiegel do not match. Records do not show the reason. In 1819, a portion of the town of Schaghticoke was annexed to Lansingburgh, which contains the hamlet of Speigletown, in the northeastern part of the town. The hamlet received its name from the Vanderspiegel families, early Dutch settlers of the southern part of the Schaghticoke area.

Technically, Speigletown was at the intersection of the Northern Turnpike and what would become Fogarty Road. The hamlet had a church, school house and a cemetery. Today, Speigletown unofficially starts around the Firehouse on NY Rt 40, just north of Troy and goes a little north of Fogarty Road. Today's lower Speigletown originally consisted of lands owned by Bedford Filkins on the western side of the Northern Turnpike and Cornelius Lansing, which was sold to Ai Pine in 1856.

In February 2008, voters of the Lansingburgh Central School District voted in Speigletown for an almost $3 million bond to improve the school facilities.

== Important businesses ==
- WQBK-FM

== See also ==
- History of Lansingburgh, New York
