= Mary Louise Peebles =

American writer

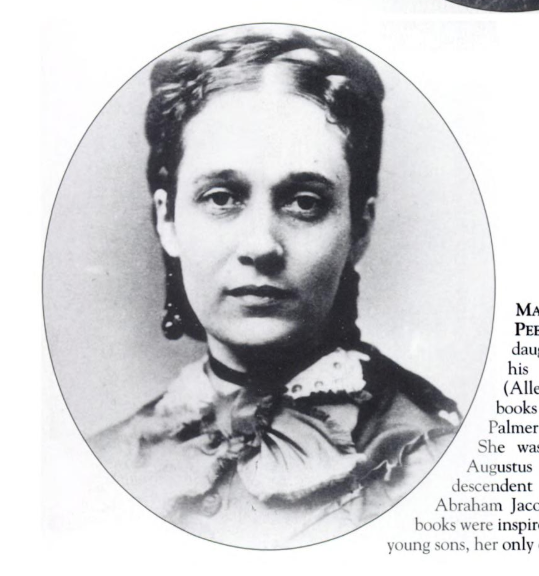
- Born: December 10, 1833; Lansingburgh
- Died: April 25, 1915 (aged 81); Lansingburgh
- Occupation: Writer, children's writer

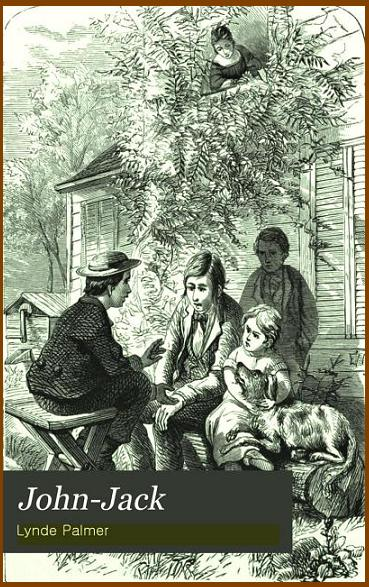

Mary Louise Peebles, née Parmelee (1833–1915), was an American author of children’s stories who wrote under the name Lynde Palmer.

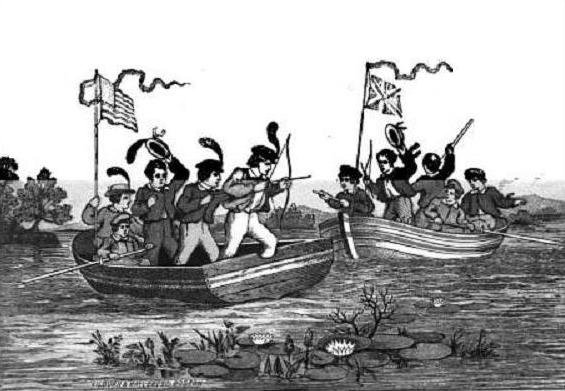
From Helps over Hard Places (1862)

== Life ==
Mary Louise Peebles was the daughter of Elias Ripley Parmelee and Eleanor Allen, descendants of early settlers of the town of Lansingburgh (now part of Troy), New York. Peebles was born at Lansingburgh on December 10, 1833, and completed her education there seventeen years later at the Lansingburgh Academy. She married banker Anthony Augustus Peebles (1822–1905) on July 7, 1862, and eventually became the mother of two sons who did not survive infancy. Her aunt, Mary Eleanor Parmelee, was known for being an early love interest of the writer Herman Melville before she chose to marry instead a local merchant.

Mary Louise Peebles died on April 25, 1915. She had been a lifelong resident of Lansingburgh, New York.

== Writing career ==
Mary Louise Peebles' book The Little Captain, published around 1861, was the first of a number of children's stories she would author over the following twenty years or so. In 1877 she released The Magnet Stories, a collection of children's yarns that included Drifting and Steering, One Day’s Weaving, Archie’s Shadow and John Jack.

== Bibliography ==
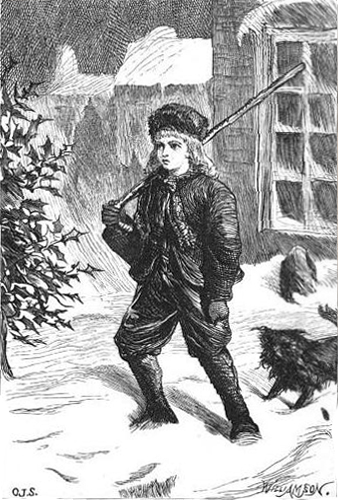
From Drifting and Steering 1870

1. The Little Captain
2. The Good Fight
3. Stories for Boys
4. Stories for Girls
5. The Honorable Club
6. Helps Over Hard Places
7. Drifting and Steering
8. One Day’s Weaving
9. Archie’s Shadow
10. John Jack
11. Jeanette’s Cisterns
12. Twinkle and Winkle
13. Two Blizzards
14. A Question of Honor, Where Honor Leads (for adults)
