= Frederick Greene =

Frederick Greene may refer to:

- Frederick Stuart Greene (1870–1939), Superintendent of Public Works of New York State
- Denny Greene (Frederick Dennis Greene, 1949–2015), American singer with Sha Na Na
