= Raymond T. Schuler =

American political consultant

Raymond T. Schuler (November 20, 1929 – November 24, 2000) was an American businessman and government official, who created the New York State Department of Transportation and served as its commissioner under three governors.

Schuler was also founder of The Business Council of New York State, Inc., New York's largest business lobbying organization.

== Early career ==
Schuler graduated from Syracuse University in 1952 with a Bachelor of Arts in public affairs and public administration from the Maxwell School of Public Administration. While at Syracuse he became active in New York State Young Democrats, which he served as vice chairman, and he worked in efforts to elect a reform administration in Kingston to replace the Republican organization that then controlled the Hudson Valley city.

He volunteered for the U.S. Marine Corps upon graduation, and served in the Korean War as an officer, platoon leader and company commander in the First Marine Division.

Schuler began his public-service career in New York State under the administration of Democratic Gov. W. Averell Harriman. He joined the executive staff of the then Department of Public Works and rose steadily through the ranks under the Republican administration of Governor Nelson Rockefeller.

He was the key architect of the reorganization plan under which portions of the Department of Public Works were consolidated with functions from other state agencies to form the New York State Department of Transportation. This was the nation's first unified state agency incorporating all transportation-related functions. Schuler served as the first executive deputy commissioner of the new department under Commissioner Theodore Parker, and then was nominated by Governor Rockefeller to succeed General Parker as its commissioner.

In 1974, as Commissioner of Transportation under Governor Malcolm Wilson, Schuler coordinated the state government's disaster relief efforts in the wake of Hurricane Agnes. And he led the successful effort to win voter approval of a historic rail bond issue that became the foundation for preserving Amtrak and rail freight service in New York State. The next year Governor Wilson was succeeded by Governor Hugh Carey; Schuler was the only Cabinet commissioner retained in the new Democratic Party administration. As New York's commissioner he led the creation of the Conference of State Departments of Transportation, to help state governments around the nation cope with the growing transportation responsibilities being assigned them by federal policy.

== Associated Industries ==
In 1977 he was recruited to become president of Associated Industries of New York State, Inc., the state manufacturers’ association based in Albany. He immediately focused on two core objectives: to build a constructive rather than hostile relationship between business and government; and to create an organization that would have foundations strong enough for a long-haul, multi-year struggle to restore economic growth in New York State.

Before Schuler entered the private sector, relations between government and the business community were strained and negative. Structural changes in the economy had made the traditional high cost of government in New York an ever more serious competitive disadvantage for the state's business community, leading to a marked shortfall in New York's economic growth relative to that of the rest of the nation. Business organizations in Albany were openly hostile to the political community, and vice versa.

Building on his political skills, his close relationship with Governor Hugh Carey, his longstanding contacts with legislative leaders in both parties, and his knowledge of key players in both business and labor, Schuler quickly moved to make Associated Industries a more positive force in state government affairs. Seizing opportunities to praise governmental leaders who were working to improve the business climate — rather than simply criticizing those who weren't — Associated Industries played a key role in supporting Governor Carey's personal income-tax cuts, and in supporting environmental and labor policies that were sensitive to business concerns.

In his first year with Associated Industries, Schuler negotiated a historic agreement with then state AFL-CIO President Raymond Corbett that raised unemployment benefit levels to benefit the jobless, while enhancing the investment tax credit for companies that were growing in New York State.

== The Business Council ==
Meanwhile, Schuler began the negotiations that led, in 1980, to the consolidation of Associated Industries with its longtime rival, the Empire State Chamber of Commerce, to form The Business Council — a single, unified voice for all employers in New York State. The new organization's first chairman was Frank T. Cary, who was then the chairman and chief executive officer of IBM Corporation.

The most contentious aspect of consolidating the two organizations had been Schuler's insistence that the Board of Directors of the new Business Council should consist of senior corporate executives. The boards of the two predecessor organizations had included a number of mid-level executives who had less clout both within their companies and with government. The senior executives for the new Board were recruited with the active help of Amory Houghton, Jr., then the chairman/CEO of Corning Inc. (and later a Member of Congress), who had first met Schuler during Corning's recovery efforts after Hurricane Agnes.

With the consolidated structure in place, Schuler set about increasing the resources, visibility, stature and clout of the new Business Council. He cast aside the old model of a “special interest” business lobby, and determinedly positioned The Business Council as an advocate of economic growth that would benefit all the people of the state.

After Schuler pledged his personal financial resources in order to secure low-cost financing for a new headquarters, the Council renovated a historic but abandoned building at 152 Washington Avenue in Albany; the staff was moved into the new facility in 1981. He strengthened the dues base of the organization, tripled its lobbying and public-relations staff, and expanded the insurance programs that helped its members cut the cost of doing business. He created a research affiliate, The Public Policy Institute, to do in-depth analysis of New York's economic and social problems.

To project a positive image of New York State to the rest of the world, The Council founded a magazine called New York Alive. In it, Mr. Schuler repeatedly expressed his deeply held affection for New York and its people. “What a state!” he wrote once. “Not just because of its geological features and its natural resources. But New York in its total sense — the land, the life style, the work, the culture and, most importantly, the people. Together, the whole adds up to more than the sum of the parts.”

== Conrail ==
In 1981, at the request of then President Ronald Reagan, Schuler joined the board of directors of the Consolidated Rail Corporation, which at the time was under government ownership. He was a leader in the effort to return the corporation to private ownership, playing an active role in the $1.8 billion initial public offering by Conrail on the New York Stock Exchange. He continued on the Conrail board until 1998, through the transition to a $10.5 billion merger into CSX and NS.
