= Bertram D. Tallamy =

American politician

Bertram Dalley Tallamy
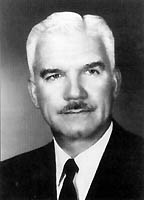

7th Administrator of Federal Highway Administration
- In office February 5, 1957 – January 20, 1961
- President: Dwight D. Eisenhower
- Preceded by: John Anthony Volpe
- Succeeded by: Rex Marion Whitton

Superintendent of the New York State Department of Public Works
- In office 1948–1955
- Appointed by: Thomas E. Dewey
- Preceded by: Charles Harvey Sells
- Succeeded by: John W. Johnson

Personal details
- Born: December 1, 1901 Plainfield, New Jersey
- Died: December 23, 1989 (aged 88) Georgetown University Hospital; Washington, DC

Bertram Dalley Tallamy (December 1, 1901 – September 14, 1989) was superintendent of the New York State Department of Public Works from 1948 to 1955. On October 12, 1956, he was named by Dwight D. Eisenhower as the Federal Highway Administrator under the Federal Aid Highway Act of 1956.

== Biography ==
He was born in Plainfield, New Jersey, on December 1, 1901. He attended the Rensselaer Polytechnic Institute and graduated with a degree in civil engineering in 1925.

He was the superintendent of the New York State Department of Public Works from 1948 to 1955 where he worked alongside Edward Burton Hughes who held the post of Deputy Superintendent.

On October 12, 1956, he was named by Dwight D. Eisenhower as the Federal Highway Administrator. He was sworn in on February 5, 1957. He served as Federal Highway Administrator through the rest of the Eisenhower Administration.

He then founded Bertram D. Tallamy & Associates.

He died on September 14, 1989, at Georgetown University Hospital in Washington, D.C., of kidney failure.
