= Arthur William Brandt =

American politician

New York State Superintendent of Public Works
- In office March 30, 1939 – May 20, 1943
- Appointed by: Herbert Henry Lehman
- Preceded by: Frederick Stuart Greene
- Succeeded by: Charles Harvey Sells

Personal details
- Born: March 14, 1888 Ontario, New York
- Died: June 11, 1943 (aged 55) Washington, DC

Arthur William Brandt (March 14, 1888 – June 11, 1943) was the New York State Superintendent of Public Works from March 30, 1939, to May 20, 1943.

== Biography ==
He was born in Ontario, New York, on March 14, 1888, during the Great Blizzard of 1888. He was the New York State Superintendent of Public Works from March 30, 1939, to May 20, 1943. He died on June 11, 1943, at Doctors Hospital in Washington, DC.
