= Lansingburgh Village Burial Ground =

Historic cemetery in New York, United States

- U.S. National Register of Historic Places
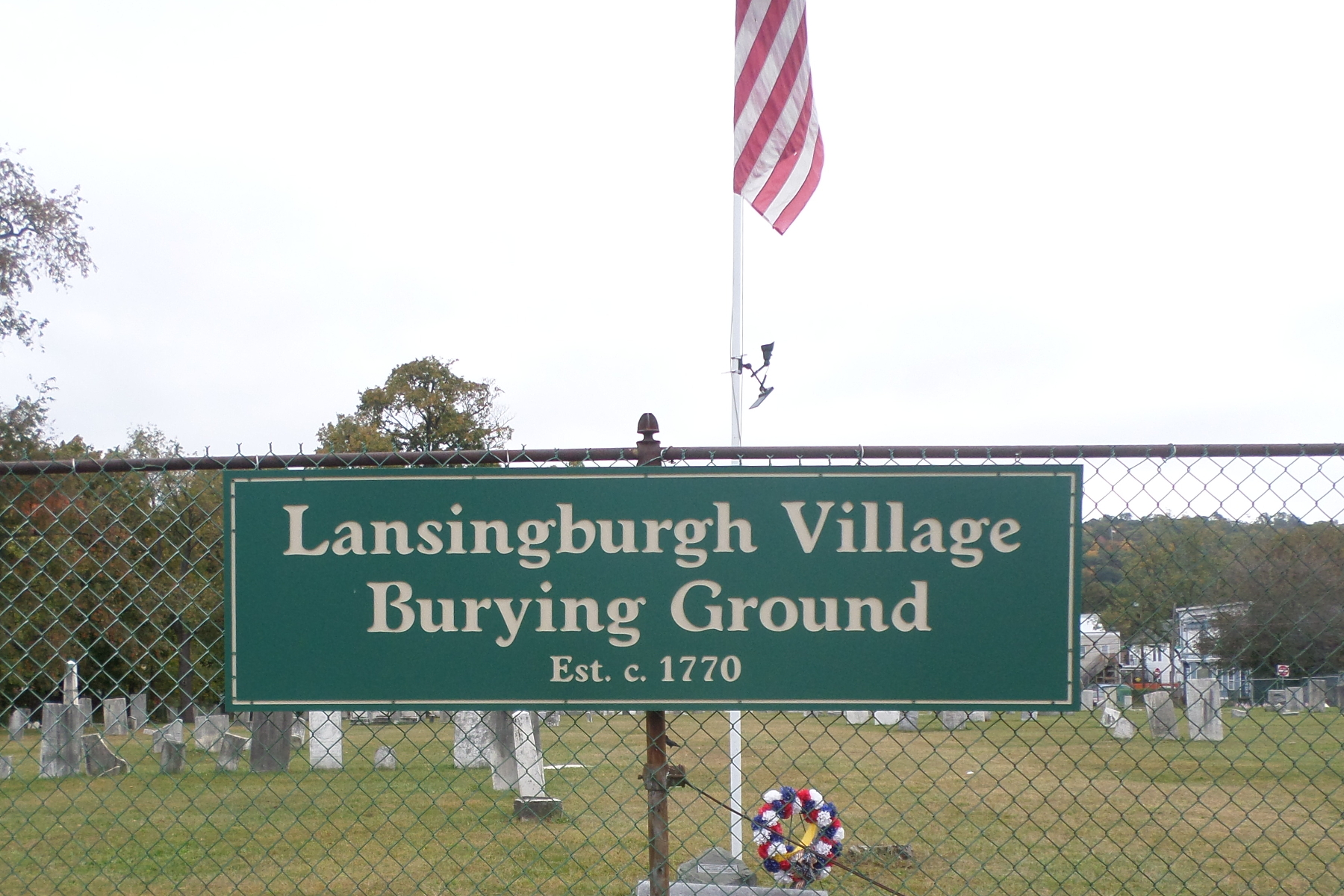
- Entrance to Lansingburgh Burial Ground on 3rd Avenue

- Location within New York Location within the United States
- Location: Third Ave. and 107th St., Troy, New York
- Coordinates: 42°45′52″N 73°40′48″W
- Area: 2.3 acres (0.93 ha)
- Built: 1771
- NRHP reference No.: 02001358
- Added to NRHP: November 21, 2002

Lansingburgh Village Burial Ground is a historic cemetery located in the Lansingburgh section of Troy in Rensselaer County, New York. It was founded in 1771 and contains approximately 350 graves dating to 1912. It contains a number of notable sandstone, marble, and granite markers that offer a complete catalog of gravestone art from the late 18th through the 19th century.

It was listed on the National Register of Historic Places in 2002.
