= Herman Melville House (Troy, New York) =

Historic house in New York, United States

- U.S. National Register of Historic Places
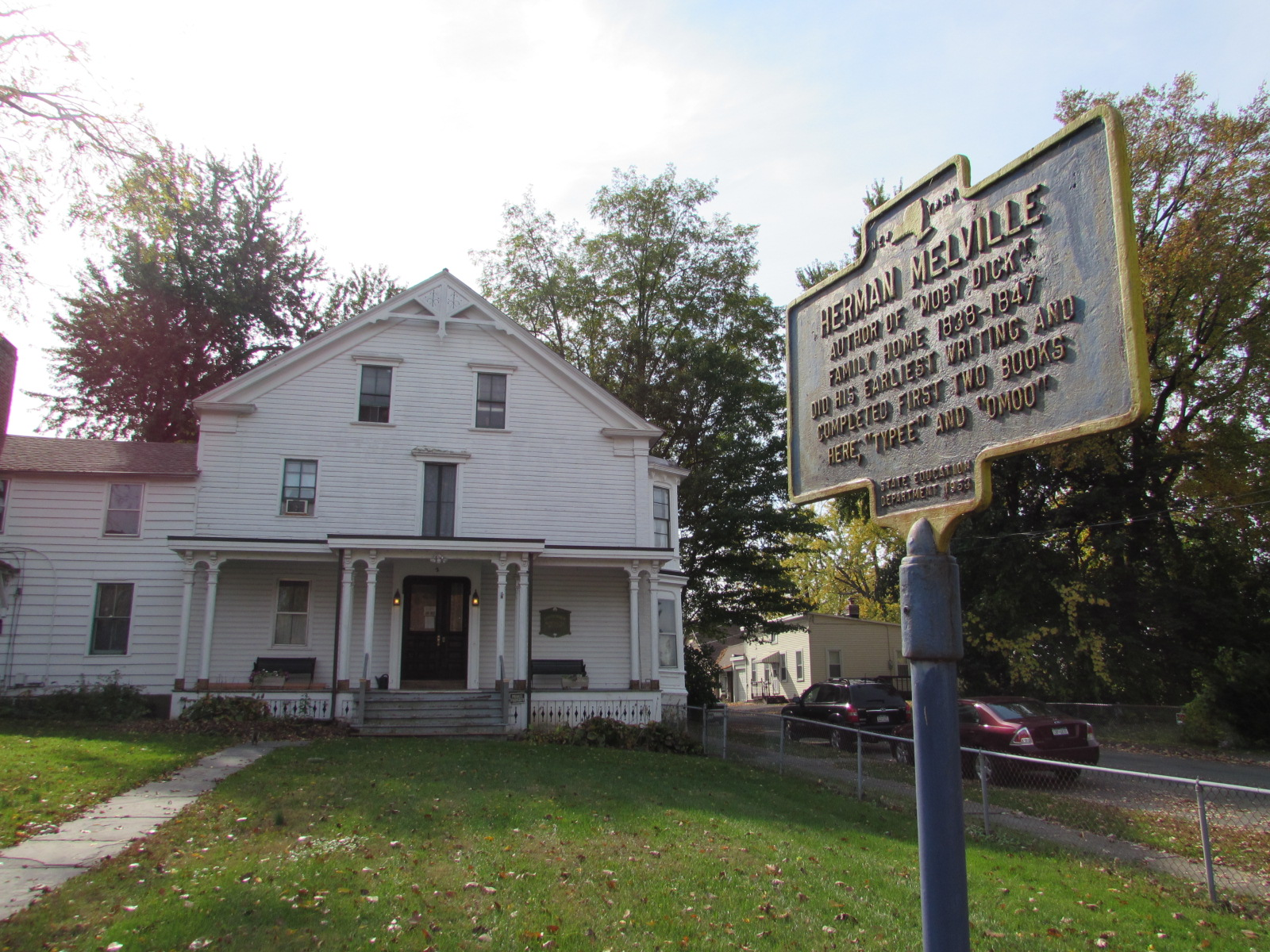

- Location within New York Location within the United States
- Interactive map showing the location for Melville House’s location
- Location: 2 114th St., Troy, New York
- Coordinates: 42°46′23″N 73°40′45″W
- Built: 1786
- Architectural style: Late Victorian, Early Republic
- NRHP reference No.: 92001081
- Added to NRHP: August 21, 1992

The Herman Melville House is a historic home located at Lansingburgh in Troy, Rensselaer County, New York. It was a home of author Herman Melville between 1838 and 1847.

== History ==
The home was originally built about 1786 and substantially remodeled in the Late Victorian style about 1872. It is a 2 1/2-story, brick and timber frame dwelling with a gable roof. It has a 2-story rear wing.

Herman Melville and his family moved to Lansingburgh in 1838 after deaths in the family and financial concerns. Five years later, in 1843, Melville's brother Allan reflected on the house as "very pleasantly situated on the bank of the Hudson (where I am now writing). Economy was the object of this change of location, and the only one which influenced my mother to forsake the 'place of her heart,' her early companions and old friends." During the family's time here, they were nearly impoverished, and Melville's mother Maria Gansevoort Melville relied on financial support from family and frequently wrote letters complaining to her brothers and asking for help. In December 1839, for example, she wrote: "It cannot be possible that I am to be left by my two Brothers to struggle with absolute want... If I have nothing to expect from my brothers but tardy, uncertain remitances, extracted only by painful relations of want — the Family must be broken up and its members dispersed."

During his time here, Melville joined a local debating society, sent letters to the town newspaper, wrote a few love poems and, in 1839, published a two-part sketch titled "Fragments from a Writing-Desk" in the Democratic Press and Lansingburgh Advertiser. He also took a course in surveying at the Lansingburgh Academy in the unfulfilled hope of pursuing work with the Erie Canal. In the summer of 1839, he also took his first sea voyage: a four-month trip to Liverpool. Upon his return, he taught at schools in Greenbush and Brunswick. The next year, 1840, he and a friend visited family in Galena, Illinois, before returning to New York. It is believed that Melville wrote his first two novels while living in this home.

The Melville family's former home is today preserved and maintained by the Lansingburgh Historical Society. It was listed on the National Register of Historic Places in 1992.

== See also ==
- Arrowhead, the Herman Melville House in Pittsfield, Massachusetts, where Melville lived from 1850 until 1863
- List of residences of American writers
