= Charles Harvey Sells =

American politician

New York State Superintendent of Public Works
- In office May 20, 1943 – September 30, 1948
- Appointed by: Thomas Edmund Dewey
- Preceded by: Arthur William Brandt
- Succeeded by: Bertram Dalley Tallamy

Personal details
- Born: September 29, 1889
- Died: January 26, 1978 (aged 88) Cross River, New York

Charles Harvey Sells (September 29, 1889 – January 26, 1978) was the New York State Superintendent of Public Works from May 20, 1943 to September 30, 1948.
