= Lansingburgh, New York =

Neighborhood in Troy, New York, United States

Coordinates: 42°47′N 73°40′W

Lansingburgh is in the northern section of Troy

Lansingburgh is a neighborhood in the northern portion of the city of Troy, New York. At one time, Lansingburgh was a village. It was first laid out in lots and incorporated in 1771 by Abraham Jacob Lansing, who had purchased the land in 1763. In 1901, Lansingburgh was annexed by the city of Troy.

Lansingburgh has its own school district.

== Landmarks ==
Herman Melville lived in what is now known as the Herman Melville House from 1838 to 1847. The building serves as headquarters of the Lansingburgh Historical Society. It was listed on the National Register of Historic Places in 1992.

Other sites in Lansingburgh that are listed on the National Register of Historic Places include the Lansingburgh Academy (1976), the Trinity Church (1995), the Lansingburgh Village Burial Ground (2002), the Haskell School (2002), and the Jacob H. Patten House (2016).

== Notable people ==
- Chester A. Arthur (1829–1886), the 21st President of the United States, spent part of his youth in Lansingburgh.
- Catcher Fatty Briody was a 19th-century Major League Baseball player from Lansingburgh.
- William Brayton, a Justice of the Vermont Supreme Court, was born in Lansingburgh.
- Edward Burton Hughes, the Acting Commissioner of New York State Department of Transportation in 1969, Executive Deputy Commissioner of New York State Department of Transportation from 1967 to 1970, and Deputy Superintendent of New York State Department of Public Works from 1952 to 1967. Upon his retirement in 1970, Hughes founded the E. Burton Hughes Achievement Award.
- George Tracy Marsh (1875–1945), author of works often set in the Canadian wilderness.
- Moby-Dick author Herman Melville wrote his first two novels in Lansingburgh. He resided at the location is now known as the Herman Melville House from 1838 to 1847.
- Children's author Mary Louise Peebles (1833–1915) was a Lansingburgh native.
