= Lansingburgh High School =

High school in New York, United States

Coordinates: 42.7634°N 73.6742°W

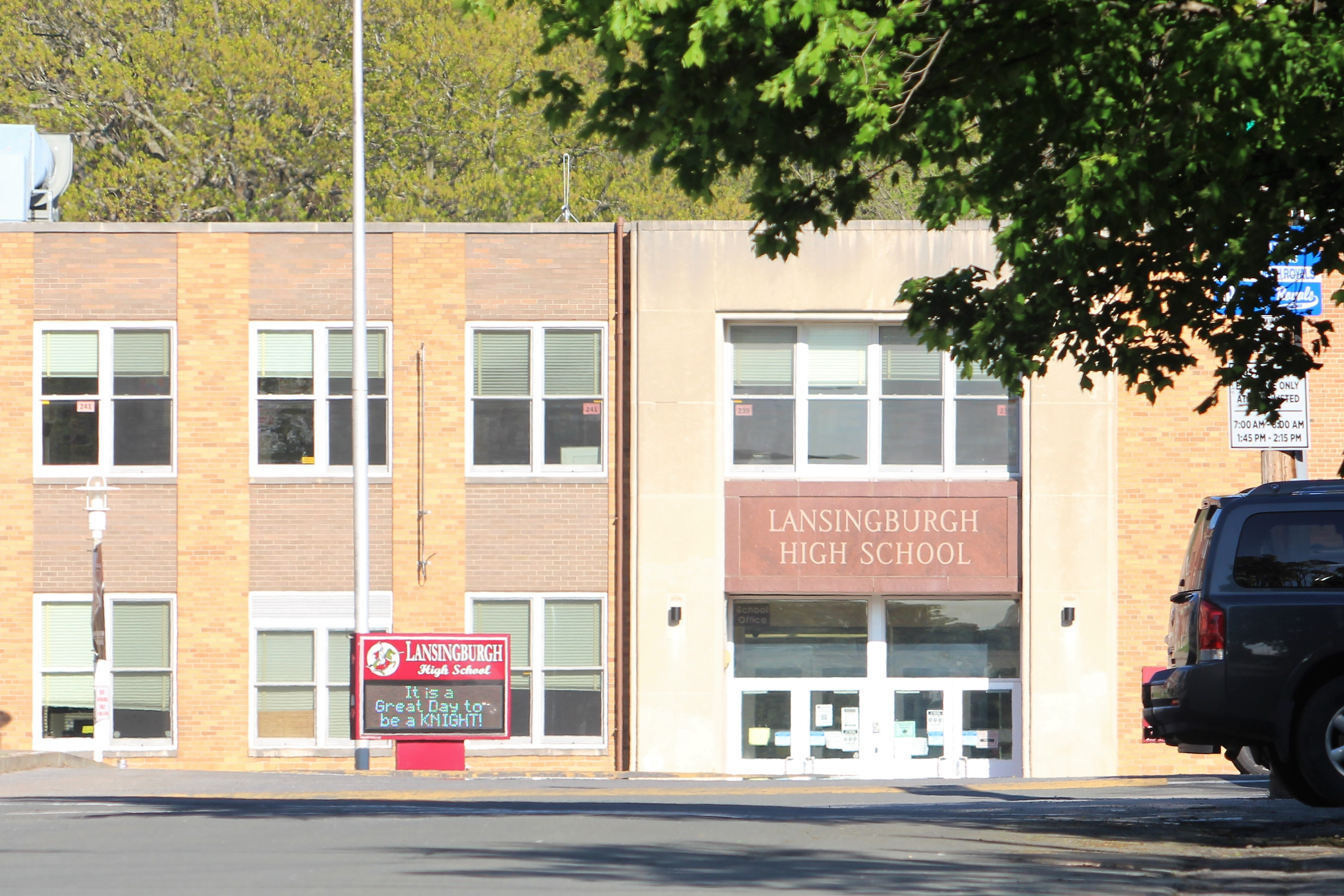

Lansingburgh High School is a senior high school in Troy, New York, and part of the Lansingburgh Central School District.

It has 790 students in grades 9–12. Students identify mostly as Hispanic; White, non-Hispanic; and Black, non-Hispanic 1% also arabs are in the school. lansingburgh students have limited English proficiency and 45% pay reduced lunch prices. With a student to teacher ratio of 14:1, the school has a rating of 4, the same as the school district.

The Principal is Matthew VanDervoort. The Assistant Principal is Andrew Sheehan.
