= Chauncey Lee =

American clergyman and author (1763–1842)

The Reverend Chauncey Lee
- Born: November 9, 1763; Salisbury, Connecticut Colony, British America
- Died: December 5, 1842 (aged 79); Hartwick, New York, United States
- Education: Yale College (AM 1784)
- Occupations: Pastor, writer
- Spouses: Abigail Stanton (died 1805) Olive Spencer (m. 1807; died 1818) Rebecca Haines (m. 1818; died 1841)
- Children: 7

Chauncey Lee (November 9, 1763 – December 5, 1842) was an American Congregationalist preacher and writer who ministered in churches across New England and New York for nearly 50 years, though he was most associated with the church at Colebrook, Connecticut.

Born in Salisbury, Connecticut in 1763, Lee was a Patriot and Federalist who believed divine providence would guide America's independent destiny. As part of this, he wrote an accountancy book in 1797, which proposed decimalized weights and measures and includes an early sketch of the dollar sign. He also penned a moderately popular poetic rendition of the Book of Job. His prominence extended to delivering the election sermon for Connecticut in 1813. A New Divine in the tradition of Edwards and Emmons, Lee vocally opposed the separation of church and state and dismayed New England's disestablishment in the 1810s. His conservative views were increasingly at odds with the emerging Taylorist movement, and he died without a post in 1842, aged 79.

== Early life, education and legal career ==
Chauncey Lee was born in Salisbury, Connecticut, on November 9, 1763. He was the ninth child fathered by the popular preacher Jonathan Lee of Coventry, and the first born to Jonathan's second wife, Love (née Graham Brinckerhoff). At the time, most New England provinces, including Connecticut, had the legally established religion of Congregationalism, governed according to the Saybrook Platform of 1708 by ecclesiastical county councils, or consociations, who leaned conservative in the contemporary Great Awakening and opposed irregular preaching. Jonathan was a New Light evangelist who supported the older Cambridge Platform of church government. He founded and served as first minister of a church at Salisbury that, with the town's support, did not enter into communion with New Haven County's consociation. By contrast, Love's father—Jonathan's father-in-law—was John Graham of Edinburgh, Scotland, an austere preacher in Southbury who served Litchfield County's consociation as registrar. Both he and Jonathan were also pamphleteers who served as chaplains for the colonial troops during the expeditions against Crown Point in the French and Indian War.

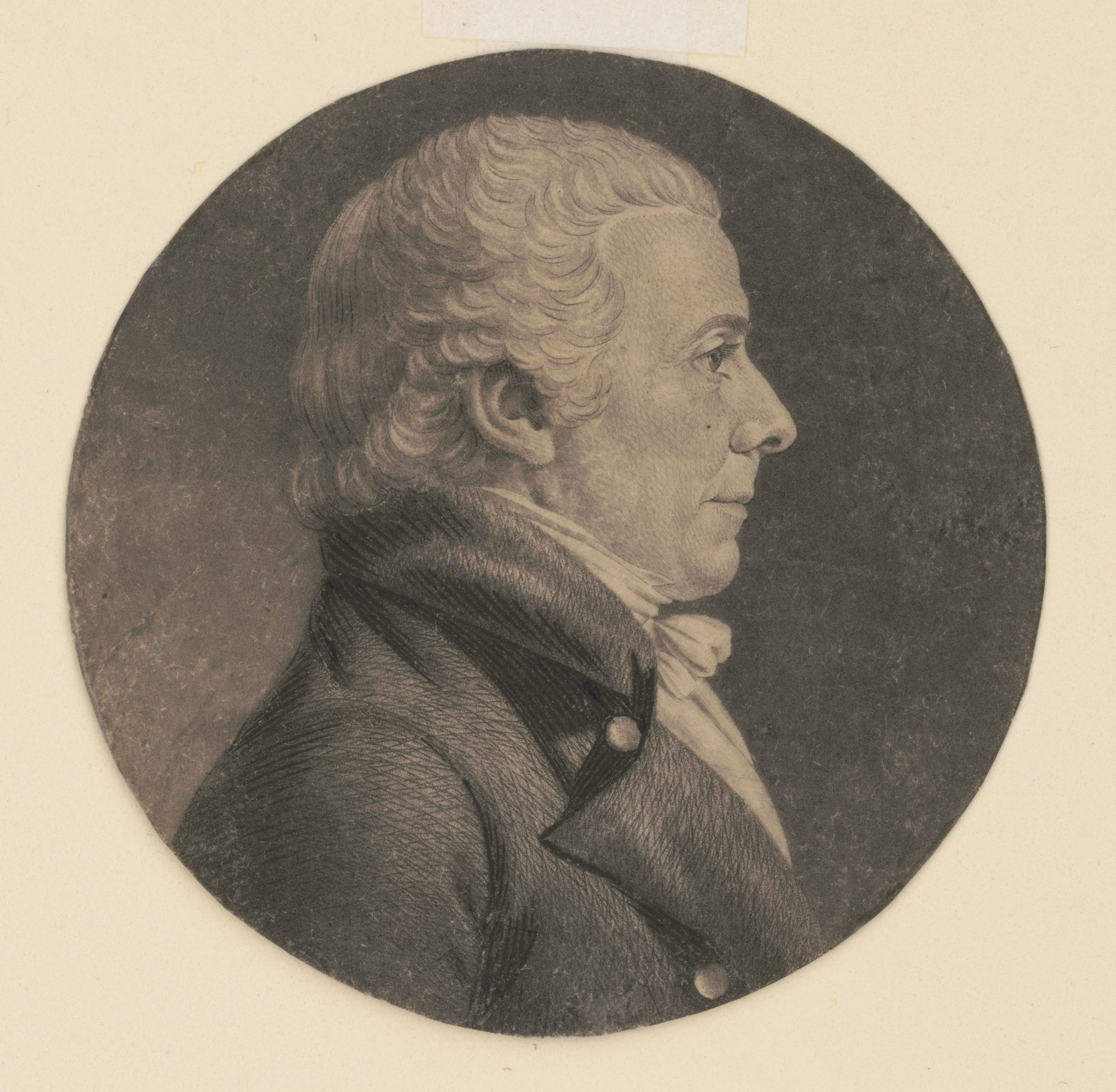
1806 engraving of Lee's classmate John Cotton Smith. After Smith was elected Connecticut's last Federalist governor in 1813, Lee delivered the annual sermon before the General Assembly.

Jonathan graduated from Congregationalist Yale College in 1742 and personally prepared his sons and other neighborhood boys to attend as well, with supplementary education in classics, poetry and arithmetic. On July 3, 1780, Chauncey passed the entrance exam delivered directly by President Ezra Stiles and formally matriculated. He studied at Yale four years and, after being nominated by John Cotton Smith, joined the Connecticut Alpha of Phi Beta Kappa in 1784. After graduating with a Master of Arts, Lee joined Smith in reading law under John Canfield, a politician and deacon at Sharon, Connecticut. In 1788, Lee was admitted to the bar of Litchfield County and opened a private practice in Salisbury.

== Preachership ==
Lee disliked law almost immediately, and, despite being recently married, he closed his office to learn theology under the moderate New Divine Hopkinsian minister Stephen West, of Stockbridge, Massachusetts. On June 3, 1789, Lee was licensed to preach by the ministerial association of Litchfield County and filled for a time ad interim in Salisbury the vacancy left after his father's death the previous year. Lee served there ably and there was a movement to seat him on a permanent basis, but Lee was apparently personally ambivalent.

=== Vermont and New York ===
Instead, Lee joined the swarm of Connecticuters moving to Vermont for cheap land, including his father-in-law, Revolutionary War Green Mountain Boys Captain Joshua Stanton, who was from Burlington. Lee sold the 35 acres of Connecticut land he inherited and preached independently for a while before being ordained as pastor of Sunderland on March 18, 1790. Sunderland then had two Congregational churches on opposite sides of the town, and allocated a lot of land to support whichever pastor was the earliest to settle there. That year both churches had a vacancy and raced to install a pastor first, but their ceremonies were held so close that both made competing claims to the land. Only after long deliberation in the County Court (and the consultation of many clocks) was it found that Jacob Sherwin, of the south side, had beaten Lee by two minutes. The protracted dispute had discredited both parishes, and Lee resigned after about five years due to the low salary. He spent the remainder of 1796 in Burlington, taught school as the first principal of Lansingburgh Academy near Troy, New York from 1797 to 1798, and then preached in Hudson, New York before returning in the autumn of 1799 to his home town of Salisbury.

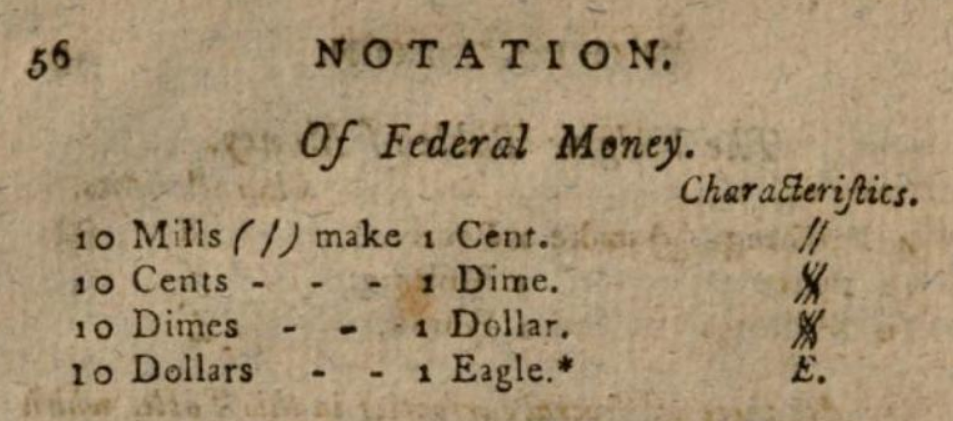
Lee's proposed notation for the mill, cent, dime, dollar and eagle. The American Accomptant was one of many textbooks after 1792 teaching the new "federal arithmetic" as accountants transitioned from using pounds, shillings and pence to the decimal-based U.S. system.

During this itinerant time, Lee began to write. He had already some misgivings about the U.S. Constitution, adopted in 1789, namely that it has "not the smallest recognition of the government being of God". However, his first works at Lansingburgh reflected the idea of American exceptionalism. First, he published a pro-Administration oration for the town's 21st Fourth of July celebration, wherein he declared that God had electrified the Patriot cause and independence was "manifest the distinguishing favor and goodness of Heaven", and predicted that by 1847 there would be millions of Americans in fifty states. Also in 1797, Lee wrote a school textbook for arithmetic that was designed to be practical—at that time, mathematics education was predominantly rote and unintuitive. Encouraged by the decimalization of U.S. currency, Lee anticipated Congress would next introduce all-decimal "American weights" and enforce the use of decimal fractions over the "vulgar evil". The failure of both meant The American Accomptant only sold one edition. However, Lee did propose (though he was not the first to do so) the use of an "S" with two diagonal marks to represent the dollar, which endures as an alternative rendering of the dollar sign.

=== Service at Colebrook ===
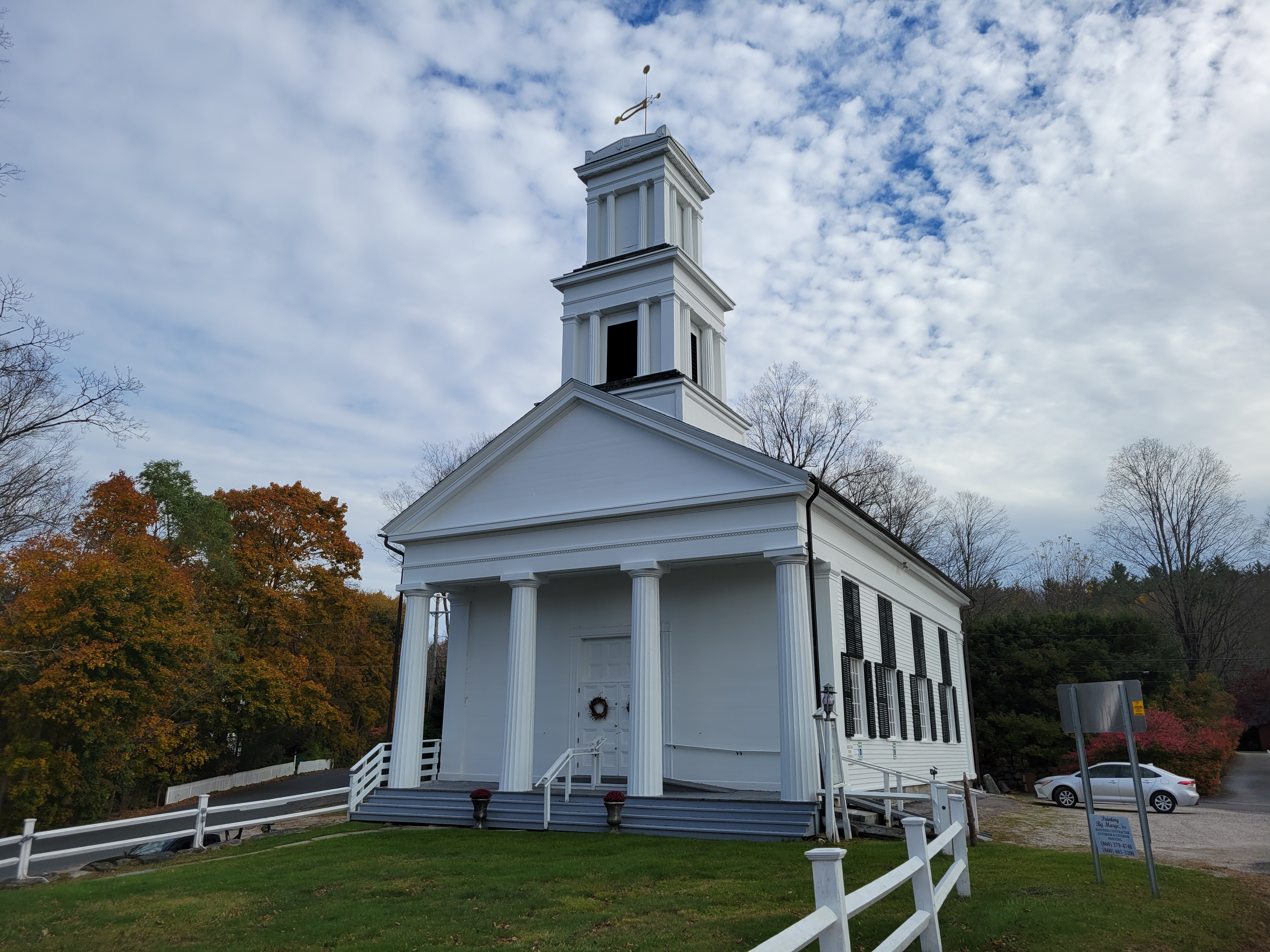
The Colebrook Congregational Church in 2023

On February 12, 1800, Lee succeeded the younger Jonathan Edwards as pastor of the Congregational church in Colebrook, Connecticut, where he would remain for the following twenty-seven years. During this time, he gained repute as an evangelist who employed serious but clear and striking language. He was chosen to deliver the 1813 Connecticut election sermon before the General Assembly, in which he invoked the Lord's Prayer to say, "religion is the only sure foundation of a free and happy government. It is the great palladium of all our natural and social rights ... if God be not in the camp, we have not reason to tremble for the ark". This speech would be cited in 1874 by the unsuccessful campaign for an amendment to the Constitutional preamble recognizing the primacy of God.

But short th' illusion—ere one summer's day,
The charm is fled, the ice dissolves away,
The waters swiftly glide, the dream is o'er,
The riv'let dries, and friendship is no more.
Hope, fair deceiver, downward to the deep,
Floats with the tide and "leaves the wretch to weep."

— Chauncey Lee, "The Trial of Virtue", p. 27

Lee published most of his works at Colebrook, including a poetic paraphrase of the Book of Job (1806) entitled "The Trial of Virtue" (and compared in style to Milton and Pope), with annotations and commentary. This was his most known work, and the one "most esteemed by himself". Lee also published funeral orations and collections of sermons and hymns he composed for revival meetings (1824).

I found three dollars inclosed from you. Oh, sir, when a minister gives to me, my heart aches. It is the greatest present I ever received from an individual. I feel as though I was doing wrong to take it. Oh, it makes me feel little, it makes me feel ashamed, to live on the charity of others. I suppose I inherit too much of my father's independency of character, pride. Till I see you, thanks, tears, prayers. Adieu.

— John Todd to Chauncey Lee, 1820

Lee was intelligent and musical (could sing and play accordion) and worked supplementarily as an inspector of schools and a tutor, including for his son, Chauncey Graham. He also rendered aid to the son of his late friend Timothy Todd, the future Massachusetts minister John Todd. Todd wrote Lee while he was a penniless and sickly student at Yale, trying to get letters of recommendation for a free coach-ride to see his sisters in Malone, New York, rather than walking all the way from New Haven. In response, Lee not only furnished him the letters, but also his home to stay, money for the road and the care of their family physician. So grateful and pathetic were Todd's replies that their correspondence was unwittingly published in 1821 to encourage charitable donations to the American Education Society. In 1823, Lee was made an honorary Doctor of Divinity by Columbia College.

=== Marlborough and final days ===
Through his career, Lee's views crystallized around the teachings of Nathanael Emmons, and as a conservative Calvinist, he vigorously opposed the "New Haven theology" of Nathaniel William Taylor. Though witty and humorous off the pulpit, Lee's sermons carried an evangelical urgency. In 1818, John Cotton Smith, Lee's former classmate and the Federalist Governor of Connecticut, was defeated for re-election by the Toleration Party candidate, Oliver Wolcott Jr. In that year, Connecticut finally disestablished, ending the formal association between the Congregational Church and the state government. Lee believed New England Congregationalism to be imperiled as a result. His final work, Letters from Aristarchus to Philemon (1833), recalled the Calvinist–Arminian debate and denounced the men "of great pretensions to reasoning powers", whose "specious and flattering doctrines" were becoming popular over the likes of Edwards and Hopkins.

On January 31, 1827, Lee resigned from Colebrook "in consequence of representations that he had lost his influence with the young people of the parish." On November 18, 1828, he was installed as pastor of the church in Marlborough, Connecticut, but here too due to the "discouraging state of things among his people" and his declining health he resigned on January 11, 1837. Lee moved in with his eldest daughter, Abigail Eliza, in Hartwick, New York and died after a brief illness aged 79 on November 5, 1842.

== Marriages and children ==
Lee was thrice married. As a poor, young lawyer, he clandestinely wed Abigail Stanton, daughter of the judge Joshua Stanton of Burlington, Vermont. According to their son, Chauncey Graham, this caused Mrs. Abigail Sacket Stanton to disown her daughter. Abigail's only brother was Joshua Stanton Jr., who served as a county judge and representative of Colchester to the Vermont General Assembly.

With Abigail, Lee had four children, of whom three survived:

- Abigail Eliza (b. about 1788), the wife of Daniel Beebe of Guilford, New York
- Chauncey Graham (May 13, 1790 – December 10, 1794)
- Chauncey Graham (July 4, 1795 – February 2, 1871), a Connecticut pastor
- Theodore Stanton (February 27, 1799 – March 15, 1885), who allegedly deserted his wife and children to marry a much younger woman, and later claimed to have served as a Colonel in the Texas Revolution

Abigail Stanton Lee died on October 20, 1805. In February 1807, he married Olive Harrison Spencer of Amenia, New York, the widow of Alexander Spencer. She was the daughter of Captain Jared and Asenath Harrison, of Salisbury, Connecticut. At the 1816 funeral of Asenath, Lee preached from 2 Corinthians 8; the sermon was published.

With Olive, Lee had three children, who were all living by 1878:

- Juliet Love (b. November 28, 1808), the wife of physician Gardner M. Dorrance of Attica, New York
- Frederick Albert (b. December 5, 1810), a dry goods merchant
- Oliver Harrison (b. June 1, 1814), a dry goods-turned-metal merchant

Olive died on June 5, 1818 and Lee married a final time on October 5 to the widow Rebecca Green Haines of New London. She also predeceased him, dying on March 27, 1841—together, they had no children.

== Works ==
The following bibliography comes from Franklin Bowditch Dexter's Biographical Sketches.

=== Sermons ===
- The Government of God the true source and standard of human government.—A Sermon, preached on the day of the General Election, at Hartford, in the state of Connecticut, May 13th, 1813 (1813)
- The faithful servants of God, the benefactors of men.—A Sermon, delivered at the Funeral of the Rev. Ammi Ruhamah Robbins, Pastor of the Church of Christ in Norfolk, who departed this life October 31, 1813 (1814)
- The Importance of the Gospel Ministry.—A Sermon, preached at the Ordination of the Rev. Jonathan Lee to the pastoral care of the Church in Otis, June 28th, 1815 (1815)
- A Sermon delivered at the Funeral of Mrs. Asenath Harrison, of Salisbury, (Con.) wife of Capt. Jared Harrison, who departed this life June 16th, 1816, æt. 66. (1816)
- A Sermon delivered at the Funeral of Mr. Cyrus Babcock, A.B. son of Elder Rufus Babcock, Pastor of the Baptist Church in Colebrook; and a candidate for the gospel ministry, in the Baptist communion: who departed life, in Colebrook, on Thursday March 6, 1817; aged 28 years: and was interred on the Lord's Day following (1817)
- Sermons on the distinguishing doctrines and duties of experimental religion, and especially designed for Revivals (1824)
  - And, supplementarily: Scriptural Hymns, adapted to Sermons designed for Revivals (1824)
- The Remembrancer.—A Farewell Sermon delivered in Colebrook, on the first Sabbath in February, 1828 (1828)

=== Other works ===
- An Oration, delivered at Lansingburgh, on the Fourth of July, A. D. 1797, in celebration of the Twenty-first Anniversary of American Independence (1797)
- The American accomptant; being a plain, practical and systematic compendium of Federal Arithmetic; in three parts: designed for use in the schools (1797)
- The tree of knowledge of political good and evil.—A Discourse, delivered at Colebrook, on the twenty-fourth anniversary of American Independence, July 4th, 1800 (1800)
- The Trial of Virtue, a Sacred Poem; being a paraphrase of the whole Book of Job, and designed as an Explanatory Comment upon the Divine Original, interspersed with Critical Notes upon a Variety of its Passages—To which is annexed, a Dissertation upon the Book of Job (1806)
- "Memoirs of the Rev. Ammi Ruhamah Robbins, late pastor of the Church of Christ in Norfolk", in the Connecticut Evangelical Magazine, vol. VI, no. 12 (Dec. 1813)
- Correspondence between Mr. ——, a member of – College, and the Rev. ——, of —, – (1821)
- Letters from Aristarchus to Philemon; in which the distinguishing doctrines of the Gospel are discussed, and objections stated and answered (1833)
