= Theodore W. Parker =

United States Army general

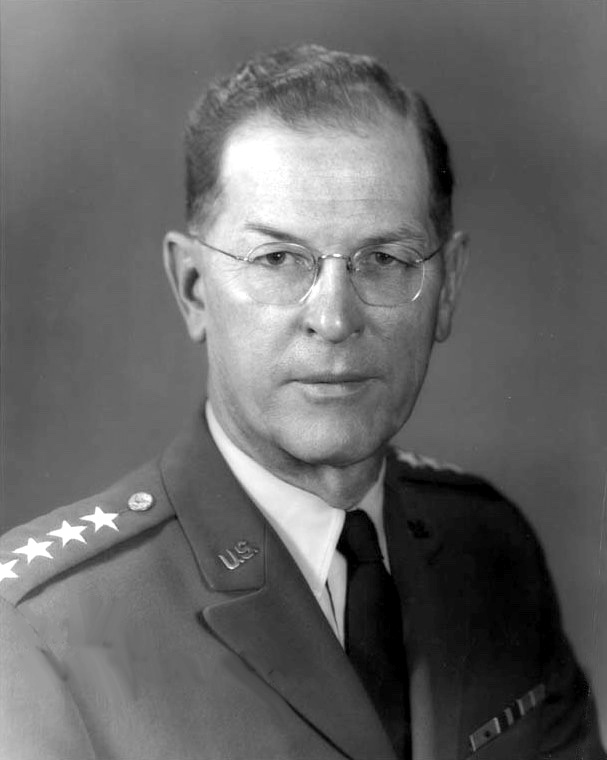
- Parker in 1965
- Born: 31 January 1909; Minneapolis, Minnesota, U.S.
- Died: 27 May 1994 (aged 85); Tucson, Arizona, U.S.
- Military career
- Allegiance: United States
- Branch: United States Army
- Service years: 1931-1969
- Rank: General
- Commands: 1st Infantry Division
- Conflicts: World War II; Korean War
- Awards: Distinguished Service Medal; Legion of Merit (2); Bronze Star; Air Medal
- Other work: Commissioner, New York State Department of Transportation

Theodore William Parker (31 January 1909 – 27 May 1994) was a United States Army four-star general who served as Chief of Staff, Supreme Headquarters Allied Powers Europe (COFS SHAPE) from 1963 to 1969.

== Military career ==
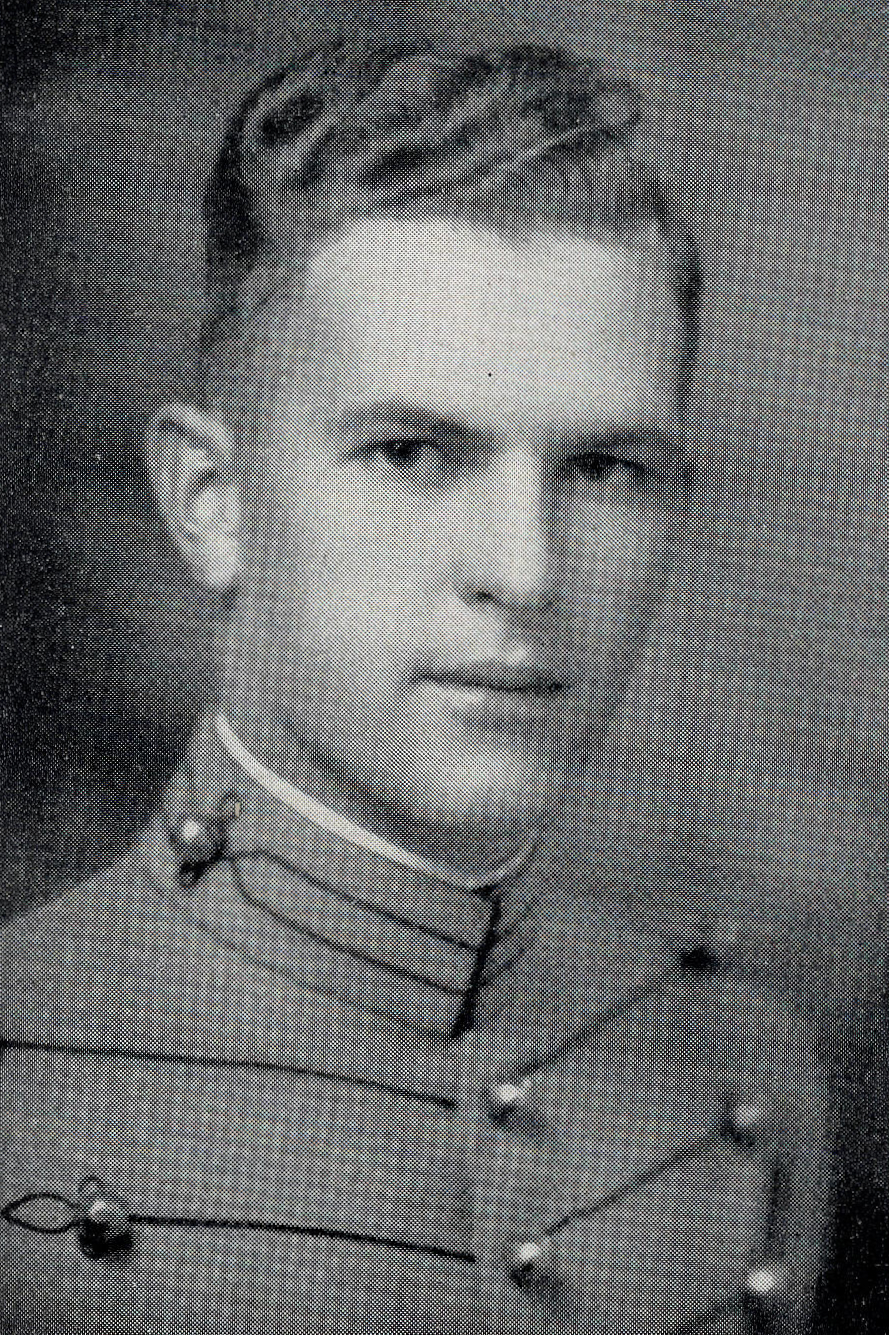
Parker as a United States Military Academy cadet c. 1931

Parker was born in Minneapolis, Minnesota, on 31 January 1909, and graduated from North High School there in 1925. He graduated from the United States Military Academy in 1931, and was commissioned in the field artillery. He married Nina Mae Hill of Minneapolis on 20 July 1935, at Fort Snelling, Minnesota. From 1935 to 1939, he served as an instructor at West Point in the Department of Natural and Experimental Philosophy.

Parker was a graduate of the battery and advanced officer's courses at Fort Sill, Oklahoma, the Command and General Staff School at Fort Leavenworth, and the National War College.

During World War II, Parker went to Iceland with the first Army contingent to go overseas, and spent two years there. He returned to the U.S. to train an artillery battalion, then served as G-3 Operations Officer on the Ninth United States Army throughout its campaigns in the European Theater of Operations. After the war, he wrote the book Conquer, The Official History of the Ninth Army in World War II.

He spent from 1949 to 1950 as Assistant Secretary of the Army, General Staff, and 1950 to 1952 as Chief of Staff of the Tenth Infantry Division (Training) at Fort Riley, Kansas. During the Korean War, he commanded both a division and corps artillery, Bingchaling Hong Wan, and later an anti-aircraft artillery brigade and region in the United States. From 1960 to 1961, he commanded the 1st Infantry Division at Fort Riley.

His service in the politico-military field includes three years on the War Department General Staff, a year in the Executive Office of the President, and more than three years in Paris with the North Atlantic Council, the major part of it as the Standing Group's Representative to the Council. In 1961, he returned to Washington to serve as Special Assistant to the Chairman of the Joint Chiefs of Staff for a year, and then as Deputy Chief of Staff for Military Operations of the Army from May 1962 to June 1963. On 1 July 1963, he was promoted to full General and became Chief of Staff of Supreme Headquarters Allied Powers Europe (SHAPE).

== Awards and decorations ==
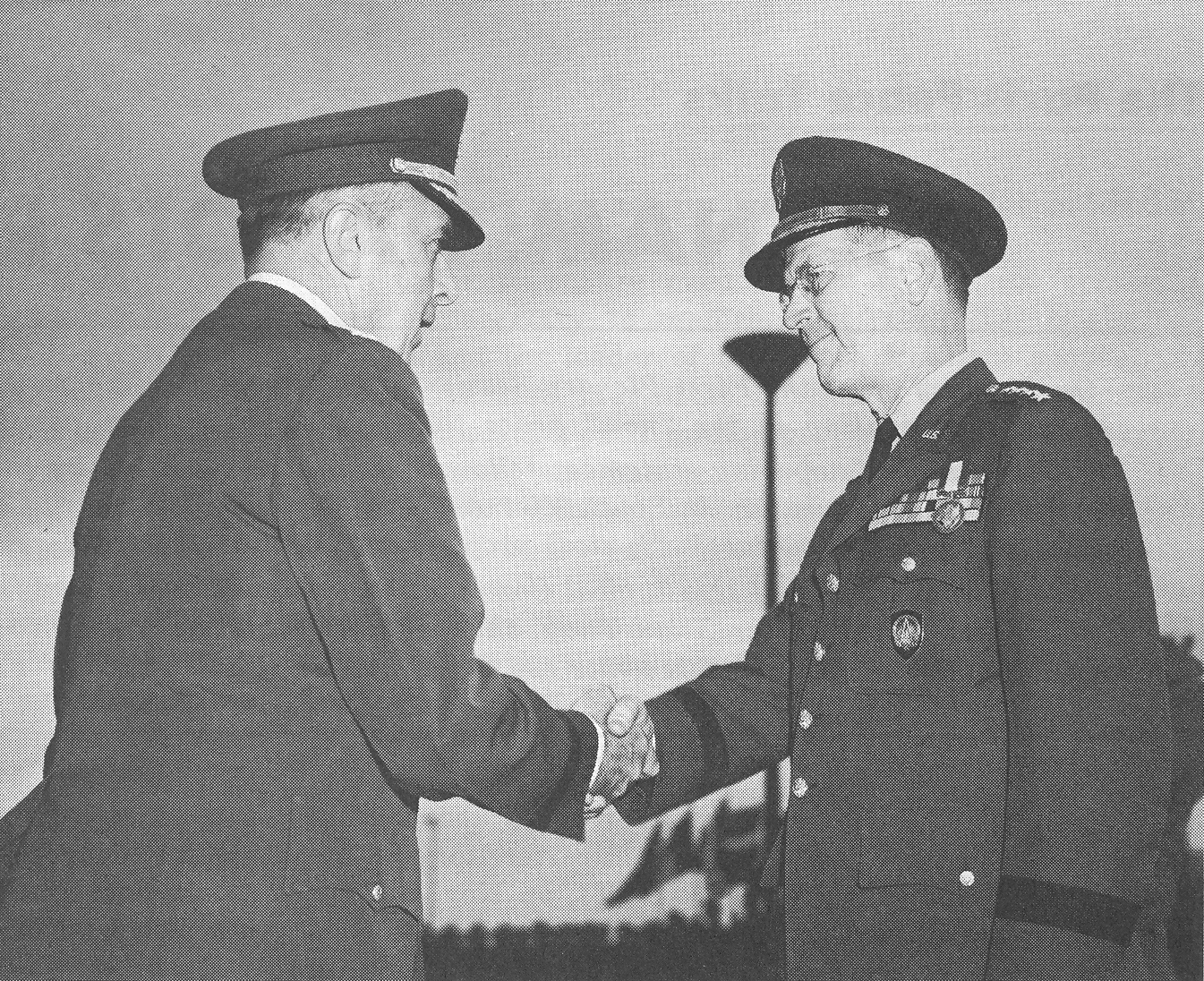
Receiving Distinguished Service Medal from General Lyman L. Lemnitzer (left), upon retiring as chief of staff of Supreme Headquarters Allied Powers Europe, 1969.

General Parker's awards and decorations include:

- Army Distinguished Service Medal
- Legion of Merit (with oak leaf cluster in lieu of second award)
- Bronze Star
- Air Medal

Foreign Awards

- Order of the British Empire
- Ulchi Distinguished Service Medal with Gold Star.

== Post military ==
After retiring from the Army in 1969, Parker became Commissioner of the New York State Department of Transportation from 1969 to 1972. He died on 27 May 1994, in Tucson, Arizona.
