= New York State Department of Transportation =

Department of the New York state government

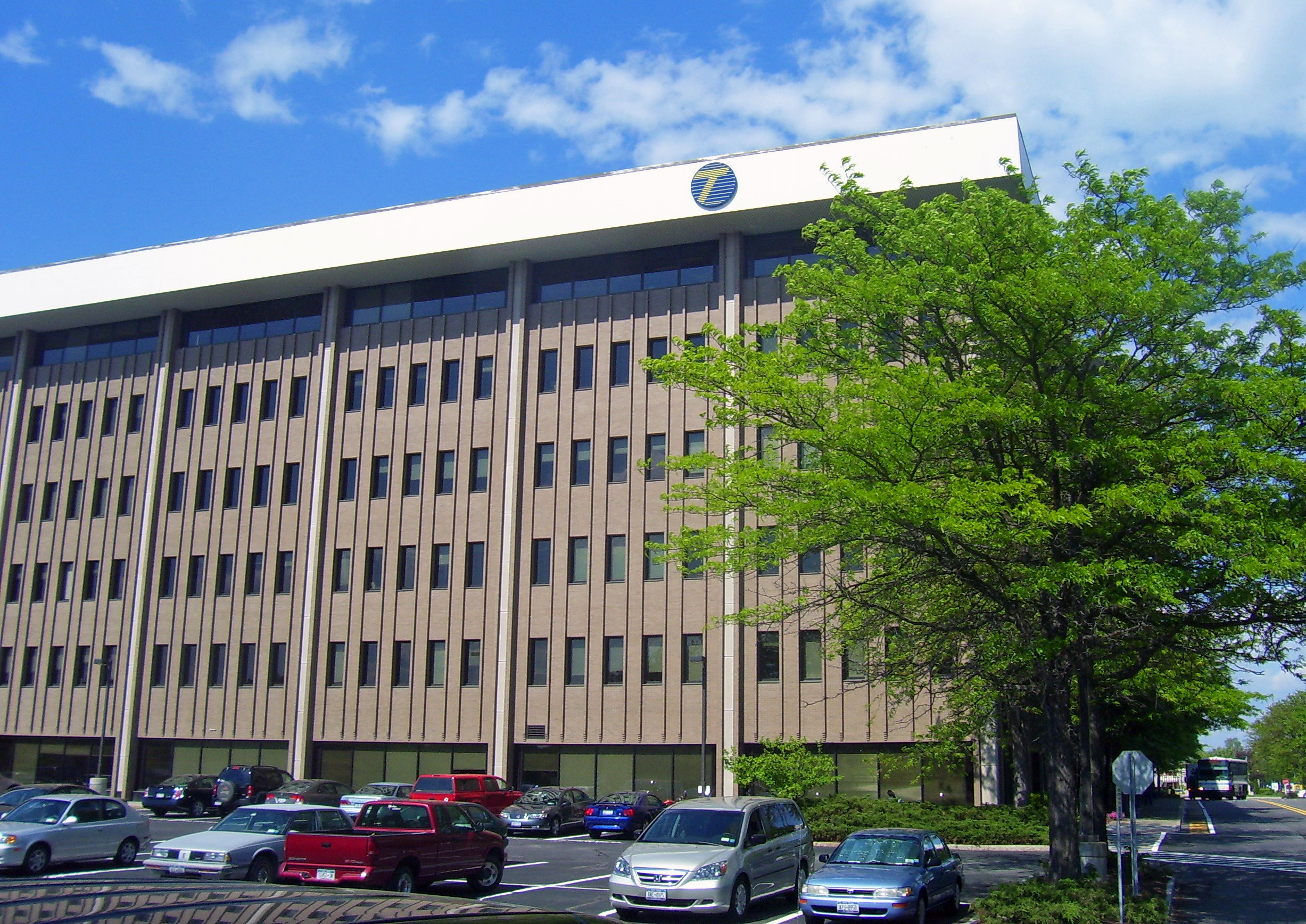
- The headquarters of the NYSDOT in Colonie

Department overview
- Formed: 1967
- Preceding agencies: Department of Public Works; Department of Highways
- Jurisdiction: New York State
- Headquarters: 50 Wolf Road Colonie, New York; 42°42′49″N 73°48′57″W
- Employees: 8,300
- Annual budget: $10.1 billion
- Department executive: Marie Therese Dominguez, Commissioner
- Key document: New York Codes, Rules and Regulations, Title 17
- Website: dot.ny.gov

The New York State Department of Transportation (NYSDOT) is the department of the New York state government responsible for the development and operation of highways, railroads, mass transit systems, ports, waterways and aviation facilities in the U.S. state of New York.

== Transportation infrastructure ==
New York's transportation network includes:

- A state and local highway system, encompassing over 110,000 miles (177,000 km) of highway and 17,000 bridges.
- A 5,000-mile (8,000 km) rail network, carrying over 42 million short tons (38 million metric tons) of equipment, raw materials, manufactured goods, and produce each year.
- Over 130 public transit operators, serving over 5.2 million passengers each day.
- Twelve major public and private ports, handling more than 110 million short tons (100 million metric tons) of freight annually.
- 456 public and private aviation facilities, through which more than 31 million people travel each year. It owns two airports, Stewart International Airport near Newburgh, and Republic Airport on Long Island. Stewart is currently leased to the Port Authority of New York and New Jersey.

== Traffic management ==
NYS DOT has several Traffic Management Centers (TMC) located throughout the 11 regions in New York State.

- Region 1 (Capital Region): The Region 1 TMC or CRTMC (Capital Region Traffic Management Center) is an attachment of the New York State Police Communications Section also known as SP COMSEC, formally located at the State Police Division Headquarters, building 22 on the W. Averell Harriman State Office Building Campus in Albany, NY. The TMC moved in September 2012 along with SP COMSEC to the new NYSP Troop G Headquarters located in Latham, NY.

Region 1 is also the home to the NYS DOT STICC (Statewide Transportation Information Coordination Center) which is staffed 24/7. The STICC is responsible for the coordination & logistics of statewide resources during major incidents within New York State and is currently located on the 1st floor of the DOT Headquarters in Colonie, NY.

== Organization ==

Its regulations are compiled in title 17 of the New York Codes, Rules and Regulations. The department comprises 11 regional offices and 68 county transportation maintenance residencies. Tioga County was moved from Region 6 to Region 9 in August 2007, and Wayne County was moved from Region 3 to Region 4 in the late 1990s.

NYSDOT regions and the counties they serve are:

Region	Main office	Counties served
1 (Capital District)	Colonie	Albany, Essex, Greene, Rensselaer, Saratoga, Schenectady, Warren, Washington
2 (Mohawk Valley)	Utica	Fulton, Hamilton, Herkimer, Madison, Montgomery, Oneida
3 (Central New York)	Syracuse	Cayuga, Cortland, Onondaga, Oswego, Seneca, Tompkins
4 (Genesee Valley)	Rochester	Genesee, Livingston, Monroe, Ontario, Orleans, Wayne, Wyoming
5 (Western New York)	Buffalo	Cattaraugus, Chautauqua, Erie, Niagara
6 (Central Southern Tier)	Hornell	Allegany, Chemung, Schuyler, Steuben, Yates
7 (North Country)	Watertown	Clinton, Franklin, Jefferson, Lewis, St. Lawrence
8 (Hudson Valley)	Poughkeepsie	Columbia, Dutchess, Orange, Putnam, Rockland, Ulster, Westchester
9 (Southern Tier)	Binghamton	Broome, Chenango, Delaware, Otsego, Schoharie, Sullivan, Tioga
10 (Long Island)	Hauppauge	Nassau, Suffolk
11 (New York City)	Long Island City	Bronx, Kings, New York, Queens, Richmond

== History ==
The history of the New York State Department of Transportation and its predecessors spans over two centuries:

- In 1781, the Office of Surveyor General was reorganized from its colonial Dutch and English beginnings to survey lands that had been vested in the state during and following the Revolutionary War.
- In 1810, the Erie Canal Commission was established to build the Erie Canal, and afterwards the canal commissioners oversaw maintenance and enlargement of the canals
- In 1848, the Office of State Engineer and Surveyor succeeded the Surveyor General's Office.
- In 1878, the Superintendent of Public Works took over the duties of the canal commissioners.
- In 1907, the Public Service Commission assumed responsibility for the economic and safety regulation of privately operated transportation; railroad and bus safety inspection; and, approval for the installation of protection for or elimination of at-grade rail highway crossings.
- In 1908, the New York State Department of Highways was established by the Highway Act. It was headed by a three-member Highway Commission, appointed in 1909.
- In 1911, the Highway Commission was abolished, and was succeeded by a State Superintendent of Highways.
- In 1927, the Department of Public Works took over the duties of the State Engineer and Surveyor, unifying responsibility for highways, canals and public buildings,
- In 1967, the Department of Transportation was formed to deal with the state's complex transportation system, and absorbed among others the Department of Public Works.

The first head of the New York State Department of Transportation (effective from 1 September 1967) was the former head of the New York State Department of Public Works John Burch McMorran (1899–1991). The first Executive Deputy Commissioner of the New York State Department of Transportation was Edward Burton Hughes, who had formerly been Deputy Superintendent of the New York State Department of Public Works, a role he had worked in continuously since 1952. Both appointments were engaged by Governor Nelson Rockefeller.

== See also ==
- New York City Department of Transportation
- New York State Thruway Authority
- Raymond T. Schuler
