= New York State Department of Public Works =

Agency in the US state of New York

The office of Superintendent of Public Works was created by an 1876 amendment to the New York State Constitution. It abolished the canal commissioners and established that the Department of Public Works execute all laws relating to canal maintenance and navigation except for those functions performed by the New York State Engineer and Surveyor who continued to prepare maps, plans and estimates for canal construction and improvement. The Canal Board (now consisting of the Superintendent of Public Works, the State Engineer and Surveyor, and the Commissioners of the Canal Fund) continued to handle hiring of employees and other personnel matters. The Barge Canal Law of 1903 (Chapter 147) directed the Canal Board to oversee the enlargement of and improvements to the Erie Canal, the Champlain Canal and the Oswego Canal. In 1967, the Department of Public Works was merged with other departments into the new New York State Department of Transportation.

== List of superintendents of public works ==
- George B. McClellan (1826–1885) nominated March 16, 1877 by Gov. Robinson; rejected by the State Senate
- Charles S. Fairchild nominated January 4, 1878 by Gov. Robinson; rejected by the State Senate on January 16, 1878
- Daniel Magone nominated January 18, 1878, by Gov. Robinson; rejected by State Senate January 23, 1878
- Benjamin S. W. Clark (1829–1912) nominated January 23, confirmed January 30, 1878 - January 15, 1880
- Silas Belden Dutcher (1829–1889) January 15, 1880 - February 13, 1883
- James H. Shanahan (1828–1897), February 13, 1883 - resigned 1889
- Edward Hannan, December 16, 1889 - Jan 2, 1895
- George W. Aldridge January 2, 1895 - Jan 16, 1899
- John Nelson Partridge, January 16, 1899 - Dec 20, 1901
- Charles S. Boyd, December 20, 1901 - January 4, 1905
- Nicholas Van Vranken Franchot, January 4, 1905 - January 14, 1907
- Frederick C. Stevens, January 14, 1907 - January 4, 1911
- Charles E. Treman, January 4, 1911 - January 1, 1913
- Duncan W. Peck, January 1, 1913 - January 6, 1915
- William Wallace Wotherspoon January 6, 1915 - February 3, 1919
- Lewis Nixon, February 3, 1919 - May 3, 1919
- Edward S. Walsh, May 3, 1919 - January 19, 1921
- Charles L. Cadle, January 19, 1921 - January 9, 1923
- Edward S. Walsh, January 9 - August 30, 1923
- Frederick Stuart Greene (1870–1939), August 30, 1923 - March 26, 1939 (retired, but died before successor was appointed)
- Arthur William Brandt (1888–1943), March 30, 1939 - May 20, 1943
- Charles Harvey Sells (1889–1978), May 20, 1943 - September 30, 1948 (announced resignation on September 2)
- Bertram Dalley Tallamy (1901–1989) September 30, 1948 - 1955
- John W. Johnson (New York) 1955 - 1959
- John Burch McMorran (1899–1991) 1959 - September 1, 1967, when he continued in office as the first head of the New York State Department of Transportation.

== Notes ==
Preceded by Erie Canal Commission	New York State Department of Public Works; 1876-1967	Succeeded by New York State Department of Transportation
