= Frederick Stuart Greene =

American Superintendent of New York State Public Works

New York State Superintendent of Public Works
- In office August 30, 1923 – March 26, 1939
- Preceded by: Edward S. Walsh
- Succeeded by: Arthur William Brandt

Personal details
- Born: April 14, 1870 Rappahannock County, Virginia
- Died: March 26, 1939 (aged 68) Washington, D.C.
- Spouse: Grace Emily Clapp (m. 1900)
- Children: 1
- Education: Virginia Military Institute

Frederick Stuart Greene (April 14, 1870 – March 26, 1939), was Superintendent of Public Works of New York State.

Greene was an outspoken opponent to the scope of the United States Numbered Highways system during its planning.

He married Grace Emily Clapp in 1900. The couple had one son.
