= Lansingburgh Academy =

- U.S. National Register of Historic Places
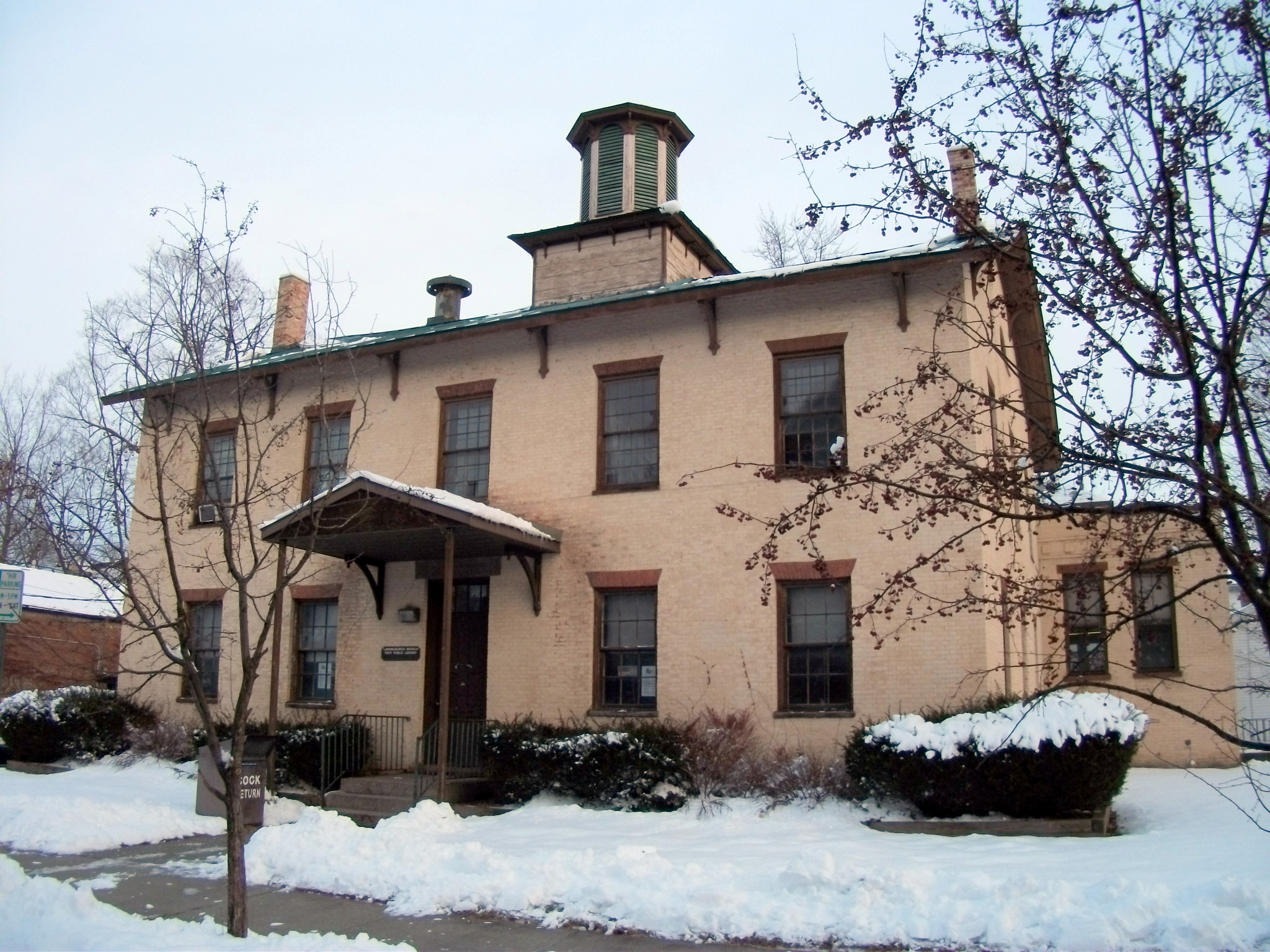
- Lansingburgh Academy, January 2011

- Location within New York Location within the United States
- Location: 27 114th St., Troy, New York
- Coordinates: 42°46′22″N 73°40′34″W
- Area: less than one acre
- Architect: Edward W. Loth
- Architectural style: Federal
- NRHP reference No.: 76001267
- Added to NRHP: October 14, 1976

The Lansingburgh Academy was a seminary in Lansingburgh, New York. The seminary was in existence from the late 18th century to 1900, when the building that housed it was leased to the Lansingburgh School District. The building was sold to the school district in 1911. Initially used as a high school, the Lansingburgh Academy was eventually sold to the local library system; as of 2007, it served as the Lansingburgh Branch of the Troy Public Library. The Lansingburgh Academy was listed on the National Register of Historic Places in 1976.

== History ==
On December 24, 1795, a group of prominent Lansingburgh residents petitioned the Regents of the State of New York for a charter, for the purpose of establishing a seminary of learning to be called The Lansingburgh Academy. They had erected a wooden building on the west side of the village green. This petition was signed by 27 persons. The charter was granted on February 20, 1796, and signed by John Jay. It contained the names of the first sixteen trustees.

The trustees selected as the first principal Rev. Chauncey Lee, a noted minister and the author of The American Accomptant.

By 1820, it was apparent that the first building was not large enough to serve the growing student body, so a second building of brick was built on the northwest corner of what is now known as Fourth Avenue and 114th Street (then called North Street). It remains almost unchanged in appearance today. The building was constructed on two lots transferred to the trustees of the Academy by a deed dated May 2, 1820.

In the new building with its expanded facilities, The Lansingburgh Academy flourished for the next eighty years. The Academy offered such an advanced program of study that students were able to enter college as sophomores after graduating.

Many famous people were connected to the Academy. Rev. Dr. Samuel Blatchford, an early president, was later the president of Rensselaer Polytechnic Institute. He was the author of a noted Greek grammar, used at the Academy and in many colleges. Ebenezer D. Maltbie was in charge of the Academy when author Herman Melville graduated with a degree in surveying and engineering. Maltbie was the author of a popular book on zoology. Chester A. Arthur, future President of the United States, taught a course in 'Elements of Law' when he resided in Lansingburgh.

In 1900 (the year Lansingburgh was annexed by the city of Troy), the trustees of the Academy leased the building with its equipment and a fine library for a period of ten years to the Lansingburgh Free School District No. 1, to be used as a high school. During this time, a 2,500 square foot (230 m^{2}) addition was built on the back of the building. On May 27, 1911, the lease expired and the trustees sold the Academy building to the Lansingburgh School District. The district used it as a high school and later as a vocational school. It was used for elementary classes until 1975.

In 1975, the Lansingburgh Citizen's Council was given full access to the building by the school district. The Council soon put together a proposal for the rehabilitation and restoration of the old Lansingburgh Academy so it could be used as an expanded branch of the Troy Public Library, and as a neighborhood arts center. In 1976, the building was placed on the National Register of Historic Places. Also in 1976, the council, under the auspices of the City of Troy, was awarded a $350,000 grant for this project. Work included a new roof, complete interior and exterior painting, new doors, a handicapped access ramp, new heating and air conditioning systems and extensive interior construction work. The project was completed in 1980 and, after a brief stay at the Methodist Church, the library reopened in its new quarters.

== Lansingburgh Branch of the Troy Public Library ==
In 1938, the Lansingburgh Board of Education voted to give use of a small room in the former Lansingburgh Academy for a branch of the Troy Public Library, and to furnish the necessary heat, light and custodial service. The branch library opened on June 15, 1939, in a room on the second floor. After only five months, the collection had doubled in size and the library had to expand, so it moved from the second floor of the school to the first. In 1952, the library was moved from the two front rooms to the rear of the building with the entrance on Fourth Avenue. In 1999, the Troy Public Library purchased the Lansingburgh Academy building from the Lansingburgh School District. In 2002, renovations were completed that nearly doubled the size of the branch.
