= Esek Bussey Firehouse =

- U.S. National Register of Historic Places
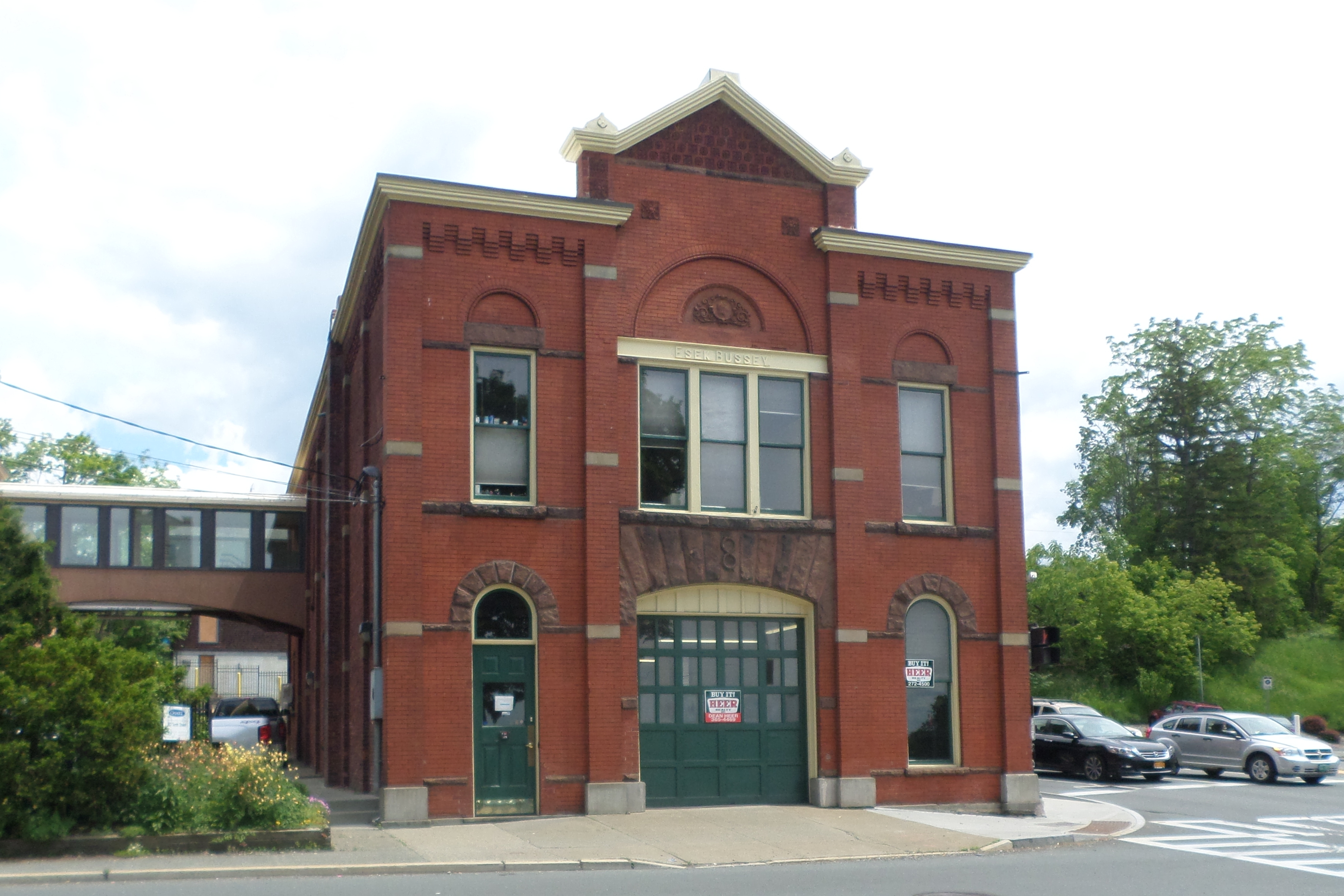

- Location within New York Location within the United States
- Location: 302 10th St., Troy, New York
- Coordinates: 42°44′23″N 73°40′46″W
- Area: less than one acre
- Built: 1892
- Architect: Fielding, H.P.
- NRHP reference No.: 73001252
- Added to NRHP: July 16, 1973

Esek Bussey Firehouse, now known as Engine Company 8 or Pumper Number 8, is a historic fire station located at Troy in Rensselaer County, New York. It was built in 1891–1892 and is a two-story, red brick building. It features a corbeled brick frieze, flat roof, rusticated stone work, and terra cotta detailing.

It was listed on the National Register of Historic Places in 1973.

During the mid-1970s, plans to construct the Hoosick Street Bridge were delayed by more than a year due to efforts made to save the firehouse.
