= Walton Wesley Battershall =

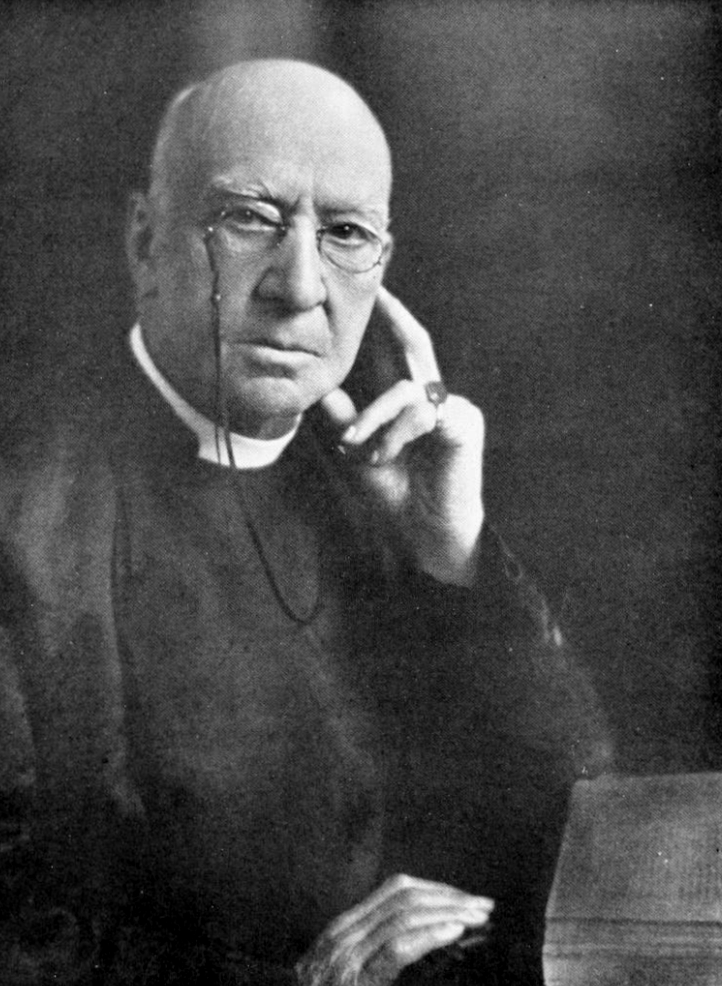
- Born: January 8, 1840; Troy, New York
- Died: March 19, 1920 (aged 80); Albany, New York
- Education: Troy University; Yale College; General Theological Seminary
- Occupation: Clergyman
- Spouse: Anna Davidson (m. 1864; died 1872)
- Children: 4

Walton Wesley Battershall (January 8, 1840 – March 19, 1920) was a priest of the Protestant Episcopal Church. He was a reverend at St. Peter's Church in Albany, New York, from 1874 to 1911.

== Early life ==
Battershall was born to Ludlow Andrew and Eustatia Ward Battershall in Troy, New York, on January 8, 1840. He spent two years at Troy University and transferred to Yale College, the original school of Yale University, which he graduated from in 1864. It was there that he won the Yale Literary Medal and a Townsend Premium in Senior year, and spoke at Commencement. He was a member of Phi Beta Kappa and the Glyuna Boat Club, and served as President of the Brothers in Unity. During his time in college he developed the yearning to enter the ministry and pursued theological studies under Rev. Henry C. Potter, D. D., between 1864 and 1865. Battershall was ordained a deacon in Troy on June 16, 1865, and shortly after entered New York City's General Theological Seminary.

== Rectorship ==
On November 30, 1866, Battershall was ordained a priest of the Protestant Episcopal Church and became the assistant rector of Zion Church in New York City. One year later, he was chosen as rector of St. Thomas' Church in Ravenswood, New York, where he remained for two years. It was then that he accepted a position of rector at Christ Church in Rochester, New York. During this time, he was a member of the standing committee of the Diocese of Western New York.

On August 1, 1874, Battershall was instituted as rector into St. Peter's Church in Albany, New York, during the Feast of St. Michael and All Angels. During his tenure, Battershall built a new rectory, purchase land, and erect multiple buildings for the church. Of importance was the Memorial Tower completed in 1876 by Messrs. Ellin & Company of New York. The belfry was equipped with eleven bells. Bell F is inscribed to Battershall as follows: "Rev. Walton W. Battershall, Rector of St. Peter's, 'Blessed are the peace-makers; for they shall be called the children of God.'"

== Honorary degrees and positions ==
=== Honorary degrees ===
- Union College conferred upon him the degree of Doctor of Divinity (D.D.) in 1878.
- Hobart College conferred upon him the degree of Doctor of Divinity (D.D.) in 1888.

=== Positions ===
- Archdeacon of Albany (1902–1920)
- Member of the Diocesan Board of Missions
- Delegate to the General Convention of the Protestant Episcopal Church
- Member of the American Church Building Fund Association
- Executive committee member of the Prison Association of New York
- Trustee of Hobart College

== Publications ==
- The Historic Church, Its Claims On Men of To-day from 1873 published by D. M. Dewey of Rochester, NY
- Interpretation of Life and Religion published in 1897 by A. S. Barnes, and St. Peter's Church in the City of Albany
- Historical Sketch and Description of the Edifice which included illustrations and was published by Brandow Print Company of Albany, NY in 1907.
- Battershall was also a frequent contributor to the North American Review.

== Marriage and children ==
On October 13, 1864, Battershall married Anna Davidson (1843–1872) at St. Mark's Church in Newark, New York. They had their first child, Walton Ford, on July 12, 1865, who died two months later on September 27, 1865. On September 29, 1866, he and his wife had their second child, Fletcher Williams. In the following years, Battershall and his wife had two daughters, Cornelia Smith (1869–1965) and Anna Davidson (1872–1966). Smith gave Battershall three grandchildren and Davidson two.

== Later life and death ==
Battershall resigned from his position at St. Peter's Church on September 29, 1911, and from that time until his death was rector emeritus. Following his death from pneumonia in 1920, E. M. Skinner Organ Co. built the Battershall Memorial Organ in St. Peter's Church. Battershall is buried in Albany Rural Cemetery in Section 3, Lot 64.
