= Mame Faye =

American brothel owner

- Born: Mary Alice Fahey; August 15, 1866; Troy, New York, U.S.
- Died: May 5, 1943 (aged 76)
- Resting place: St Joseph's Cemetery Auburn, New York
- Occupation: Bordello owner
- Years active: c. 1906–1941

Mame Faye, born Mary Alice Faye (August 15, 1866 – May 5, 1943), (sometimes spelled Mame Fay, Mayme Fay, Maime Fay, etc.) was a madam from Troy, New York. She ran a brothel at 1725 6th Avenue in the heart of the red-light district, which was known as The Line, from approximately 1906 to 1941. Her clients included politicians, factory workers and military men.

Mame Faye is currently honoured by a New York tugboat bearing her name.

== Personal life ==
Mame Faye was born Mary Alice Fahey, the daughter of Irish immigrants Thomas Fahey and Margaret McNamara Fahey. She had two siblings: Thomas, who was killed when struck by a train in 1896, and Martha, who later married Michael Myers.

Faye married a man named Bonter in 1897 (presumed to be saloon owner G. A. Bonter), but Mrs. Mary Bonter reported herself "single" or "widowed" on censuses from 1910 on. In the 1905 City Directory she was recorded as living with her brother-in-law (assumed to be Michael Myers) at 330 First Street.

Little is known about Mary Fahey's life before 1904, when a prostitute named "Mame Fay" was arrested in a sweep of Troy's houses of ill repute.

After retiring she lived with her nephew Thomas Myers. Mrs. Mary Bonter died two years later at the age of 77, leaving an estate valued at $282,690.76 (about $3.5 million today) to her nephew Thomas. She was buried in St. Joseph's Cemetery in the Fahey family plot. Although she set aside $2,500 to pay for a monument, none was erected until 2006.

== Bordello ==
Faye purchased a row house in 1906 and opened her own bordello on 1725 Sixth Avenue, three buildings north of the police station and opposite the Union Station. Sixth Avenue led up the hill to the Rensselaer Polytechnic Institute (RPI), and a set of steps led from the back of Faye's house to the Institute. A policeman was often stationed outside the brothel at busy times to keep the patrons in order. In return, Faye would keep the police station supplied with fresh coffee.

City censuses from 1910 to 1930 list up to six female boarders between the ages of 19 and 36 living in Mary's house, whose occupations were listed variously as "domestic" or "unemployed". The census also lists a "radio set" on the premises.

As a city, Troy developed a reputation for this kind of work, largely built on serving the New England market, where houses could not operate as freely. (Another well-known house was the Old Daley Inn, now the "Olde 499 House" restaurant.) Access to Canadian liquor also supported the business, especially through Prohibition. Faye would recruit prostitutes from local lunch shops, telling them they were "sitting on a million" and offer them $100 a week wages, at time when a female factory worker would earn $15-$18 a week. Faye was reported to be good to the women who worked for her and made sure they were in good health and received medical care when needed. In 1927 she gave the doctor who attended the brothel two tickets for a holiday in Havana.

In the 1930s, a local newspaper included a flyer for 5 of the bordellos of The Line, including Mame Faye's Notchery.

Mame's nearly 40-year career as madam coincided with a major shift in American attitudes toward prostitution. What earlier Victorian mores had deemed a necessary evil became known as "the social evil". An effective public campaign was waged to prove that prostitution was the cause of all other social ills, particularly venereal disease epidemics among soldiers. Wildly overblown reports of "white slavery", in which young (mostly white) women were kidnapped by (mostly Asian) men and forced into prostitution, swept the nation. This was one of the major American culture wars of the 20th century.

The passage of the Mann Act forced the hand of local governments who had allowed this illegal practice to flourish for decades.

Mame had a lot of money and a good lawyer. Still, after decades of legal skirmishes, her house was closed for good in 1941. District Attorney Earl Wiley made a name for himself by clearing the social evil from the notoriously corrupt Troy.

The 6th Avenue row house was torn down in 1952 as part of an improvement to the city.

== Film ==
In 2008, directors Penny Lane and Anne Marie Lanesey made a documentary film was made about Mame Faye entitled "Sittin' on a Million", the title being a phrase Faye reportedly used when recruiting prostitutes. Lane and Lanesey are both graduates of the RPI.
