= Uncle Sam Atrium =

Shopping and office complex in Troy, New York, U.S.

- Interactive map of the Uncle Sam Atrium area
- Alternative names: Troy Atrium

General information
- Location: 4 Third Street, Troy, New York, United States
- Coordinates: 42°43′55″N 73°41′22″W
- Completed: 1979 (as a mall) 1999 (as office)
- Closed: 1994 (as a mall)
- Cost: $7.4 million USD
- Owner: The Bryce Companies

Technical details
- Floor area: 166,000 square feet (15,400 m^{2})

Design and construction
- Architecture firm: Geoffrey Freeman Associates ELS Design Group
- Developer: Carl G. Grimm
- Uncle Sam Atrium
- U.S. Historic district – Contributing property
- Part of: Central Troy Historic District (ID16000367)
- Designated CP: July 14, 2016

The Uncle Sam Atrium and Parking Garage is an urban office space, and parking garage in downtown Troy, New York, (formerly an enclosed shopping mall). Originally envisioned as a much larger $96 million shopping mall in the early 1970s, the project stagnated due to financial problems until local developer Carl Grimm put forth the financing to complete a smaller shopping center. Due to its small size, Troy's population loss, and competition from nearby larger suburban malls, the Uncle Sam Atrium became underutilized and mostly vacant by the early 1990s. In the late 1990s and 2000s, the mall was bought by David Bryce and saw most of its retail space converted to offices for the New York State Department of Health and Department of Labor. Today, the mall along with the attached Frear Building is mostly occupied by office space and retail.

The Uncle Sam Atrium is also home to the Troy Waterfront Farmer's Market during the winter months, with the exception of 2020 where the market moved to the former Price Chopper in Lansingburgh during the COVID-19 pandemic.

== History ==
The idea for a large shopping mall to revitalize downtown Troy was first presented in October 1969. The proposed project was called the Uncle Sam Mall and it envisioned a $96 million shopping mall with a heliport, civic center, theater, and parking for 7,300 vehicles. The opening of the proposed Hoosick Street Bridge was considered to be essential to the success of the project. The Troy Urban Renewal Agency (TURA) had allotted an area bounded by Sixth Avenue, Broadway, Federal Street, and Broadway as Project C. The existing properties in Project C would be bought and demolished by the TURA and the land would be developed privately. The project was split into multiple phases with the Phase One focusing on the land between Third Street, Fourth Street, Broadway, and Grand Street. The funding for the Uncle Sam Mall came from the US Department of Housing and Urban Development (HUD), Caldwell Development Corp., and the New York State Urban Development Corp. (UDC). Demolition for Phase One started in 1973, however, by late 1974 Caldwell Development was dropped from the project because they could not secure funding. The recession at the time had caused the UDC to run out of money by 1975 and local business support for the project fell.

It was not until 1976 that local developer Carl Grimm had taken up the project. Carl Grimm turned the empty site to a two-story indoor mall with the city providing a 530-car garage. The city hired Geoffrey Freeman Associates to design the mall and ELS Design Group to design the parking garage. The Uncle Sam Atrium broke ground in 1977 and opened in 1979. The atrium had two local department stores, a small movie theater, and more stores but by the 1990s the mall was mostly empty. Beginning in 1994, retail space in the Uncle Sam Atrium was converted to office space for New York State agencies, with the former Denby's and Carl Company space among the areas converted. In 1999 David Bryce bought the mall and turned many of the empty retail spaces into offices for the New York State Department of Health and Department of Labor. Today, the atrium is home to the Troy Waterfront Farmer's Market during the winter months and the current owner Bryce Companies has potentials plans for expanding and renovating the space.
