= Collar City Bridge =

Bridge in Green Island and Troy, New York

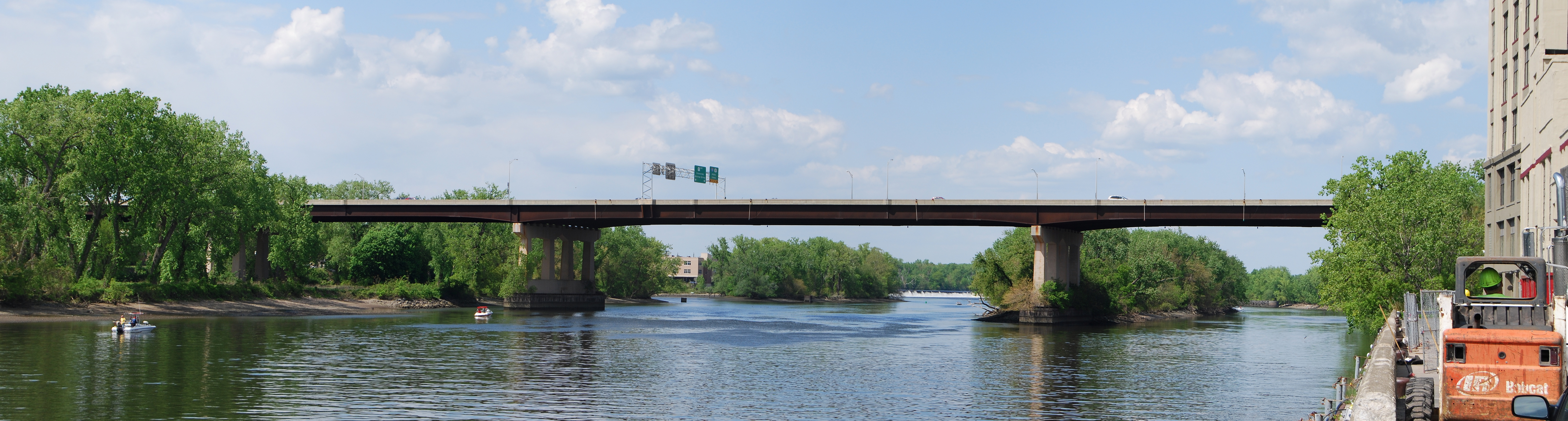
- Coordinates: 42°44′25″N 73°41′20″W
- Carries: I-787 / NY 7
- Crosses: Hudson River
- Locale: Green Island, NY and Troy, NY
- Other name: Hoosick Street Bridge
- Maintained by: New York State Department of Transportation
- ID number: 1070869

Characteristics
- Design: Girder bridge
- Total length: 2,238 ft (682 m)
- Width: 121.1 ft (36.9 m)
- Longest span: 379.9 ft (115.8 m)
- No. of spans: 12
- Clearance below: 61 ft (19 m)
- No. of lanes: 8

History
- Construction start: July 20, 1977
- Opened: August 14, 1980

Statistics
- Daily traffic: 56,731 (2017)

Location
- Interactive map of Collar City Bridge

The Collar City Bridge (also known as the Hoosick Street Bridge) carries Interstate 787 (I-787) and NYS Route 7 (NY 7) across the Hudson River in New York connecting Green Island with Troy. Although the crossing was first proposed in 1954, the bridge was not completed until 1980 due to uncertainties associated with a proposed north-south highway in Troy at the eastern end of the span, attempts to save a historic building, environmental permitting requirements, and litigation. It was the final portion of I-787 to be completed.

== History ==
=== Planning ===
Plans for the construction of a new bridge across the Hudson River connecting to Hoosick Street in Troy were proposed in 1954 as part of a 39.2-mile (63.1 km) system of new arterials in the cities of Troy, Watervliet and Cohoes, which was designed to alleviate traffic congestion in the area through 1970. At the time, as much as 60 percent of the vehicles on NY 7 passing through Troy were out-of-town through traffic. (Note: Before the Collar City Bridge was completed, NY 7 was routed within Troy from Hoosick Street to the Troy-Watervliet Bridge via 15th Street and Congress Street.) A subsequent study of vehicles crossing the Hudson River in the 1970s showed that approximately 50 percent of traffic using the Green Island Bridge and approximately 25 percent of the traffic using the Congress Street Bridge were traveling to/from Hoosick Street or points north of Troy.

The proposed span across the Hudson River was approved as part of the Interstate Highway System in 1957. On August 15, 1962, a public hearing on the proposed north-south highway along the west bank of the river (now I-787), which would run from Albany to the intersection of Hoosick Street and Eighth Street in Troy. As originally planned, the project would include an interchange near the west end of the new bridge (the Maplewood Interchange) that would provide future access to two other proposed highways: Alternate Route 7 and a riverfront arterial route to Waterford (now NY 787). The interstate project received approval from the Bureau of Public Roads the following year. (Note: I-787 was truncated to end at the Maplewood Interchange in 1970, when NYSDOT had proposed I-88 as a new interstate route between Binghamton and Troy, running along the alignment of Alternate Route 7.)

The New York State Department of Public Works (and later NYSDOT) subsequently advanced designs for the Hoosick Street Bridge, which considered alternate schemes involving direct ramp connections from Hoosick Street to a proposed north-south arterial within Troy. In 1971, NYSDOT decided to construct a bridge between the Maplewood Interchange and Troy that would be independent of connections to the proposed north-south arterial, but would not preclude future connections to the proposed thoroughfare. (Note: By 1973, plans for the north-south arterial in Troy had shifted from a limited-access highway to a four-lane roadway similar to Wolf Road in Colonie.) The Maplewood Interchange was completed in 1972, and the design of the current bridge began that same year as the final portion of I-787.

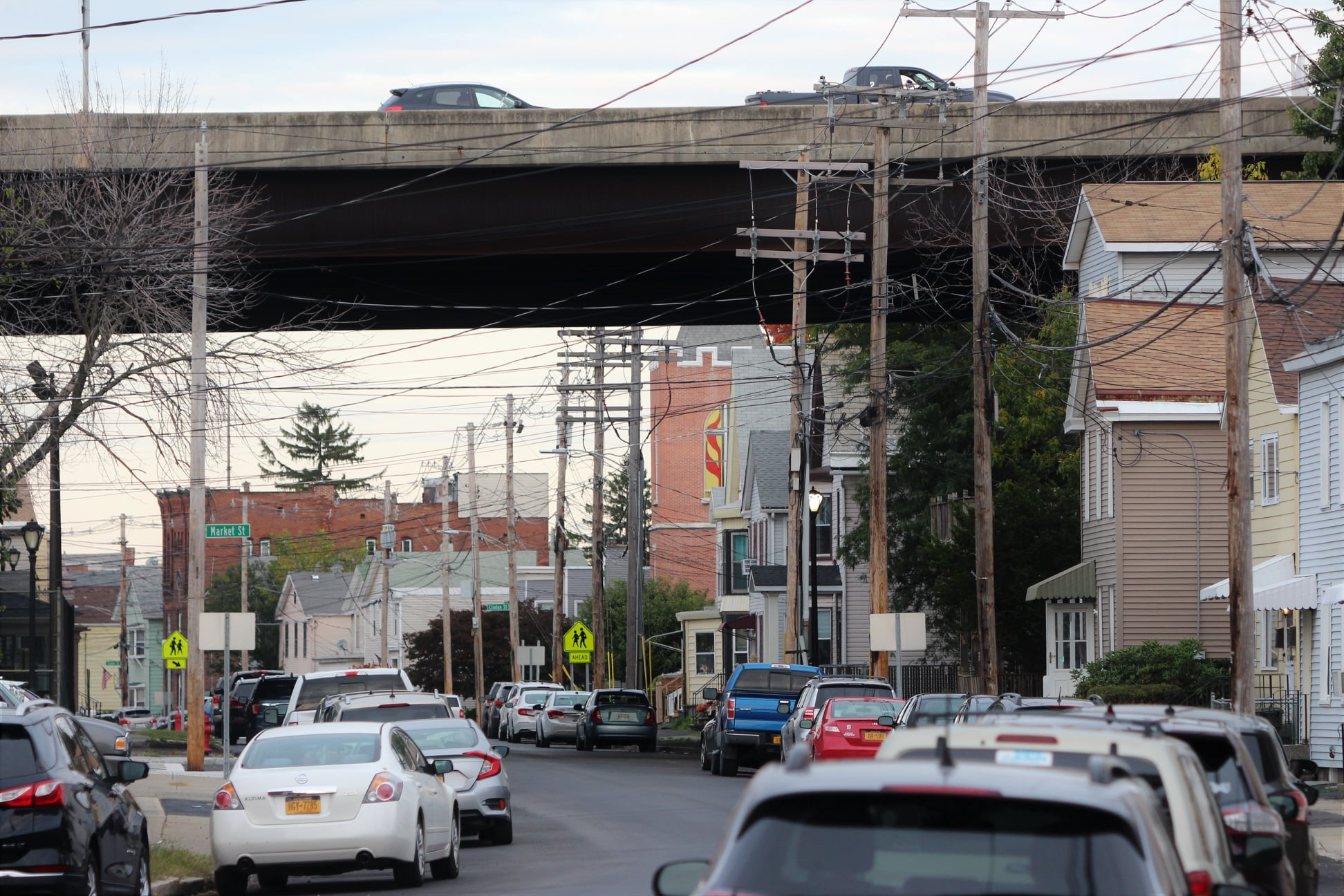
Looking north at the Collar City Bridge from Hudson Avenue in Green Island

Three design alternatives for the Hoosick Street Bridge were studied in the project's Environmental Impact Statement (EIS), which differed in how approach roadways would connect the bridge to downtown Troy. One of the options was developed in consultation with the planners of the Uncle Sam Mall and involved a relocation of Sixth Avenue between Hoosick and Jacob streets using a portion of an abandoned railroad right-of-way; construction of the Hoosick Street Bridge was considered to be essential to the success of the planned shopping center. A bus garage for the Capital District Transportation Authority was planned to abut the south side of the bridge near Sixth Avenue, which would serve as a buffer to the adjacent neighborhood. (Note: The Troy Bus Facility was dedicated on February 28, 1981.)

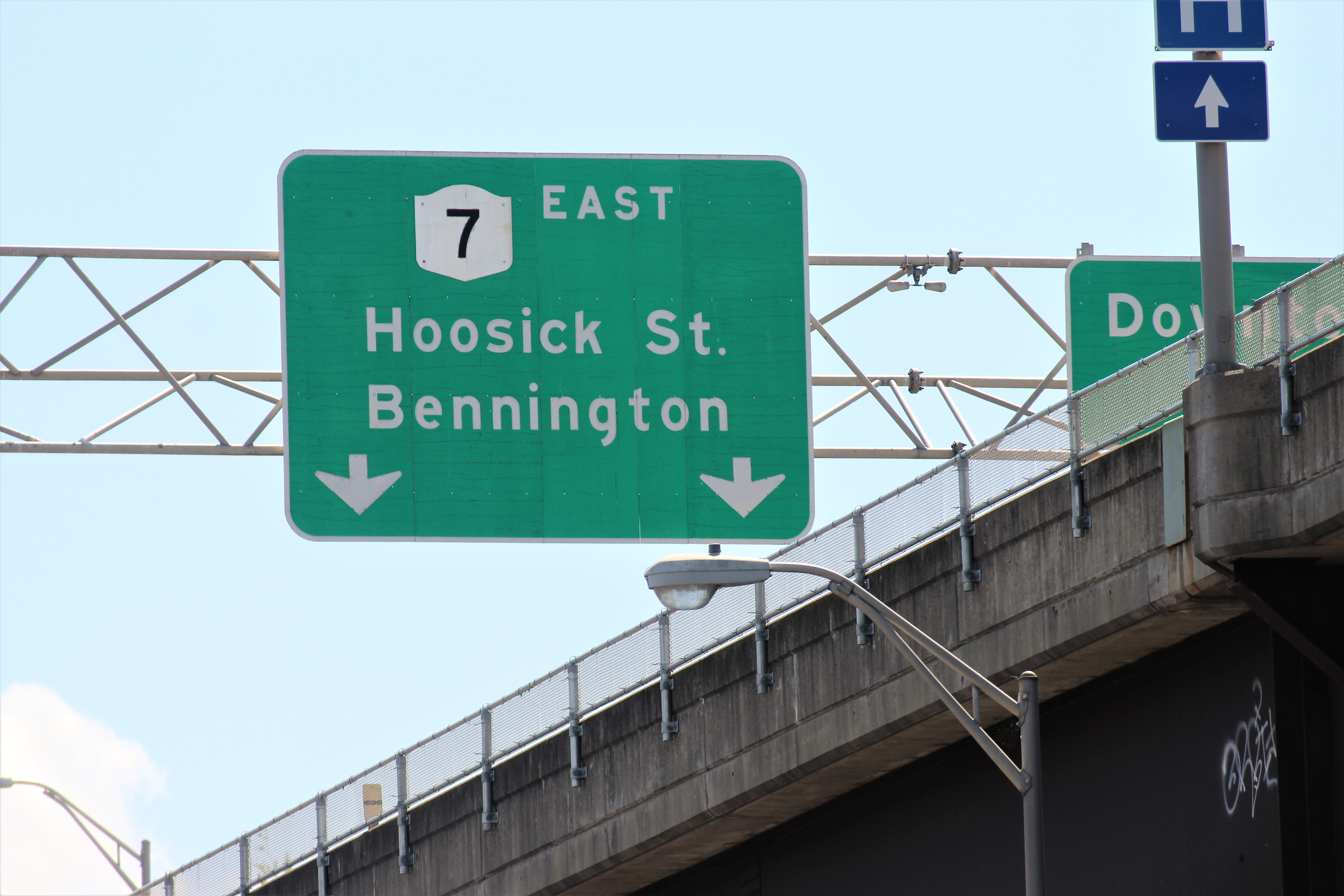
Looking east at the bridge from Hoosick Street near Fifth Avenue in Troy

Overall, the alternatives for the bridge were projected to displace about 30 to 40 existing businesses and anywhere from 135 to 213 existing families, depending on the option selected. The project was delayed by more than a year because the Esek Bussey Firehouse at the intersection of Hoosick and 10th streets was added to the National Register of Historic Places in July 1973 and efforts were made to save the historic building.

The EIS for the Hoosick Street Bridge was completed in 1976—the first such document prepared by NYSDOT under the National Environmental Policy Act—and the project was approved by the Federal Highway Administration in April of that same year. However, a coalition of 10 individuals and organizations filed a lawsuit in May 1976, claiming that the EIS was inadequate. The case was assigned to Judge James Thomas Foley, who later remarked, "I always enjoy the fact that after this thing has been kicking around for 20 years, they want you to decide in 10 minutes."

=== Construction and opening ===
Bids for the first phase of construction of the Hoosick Street Bridge were opened on March 24, 1977. NYSDOT had originally planned to hold off on awarding the bid until April 6, 1977, which was later pushed back to May 7, 1977 due to the ongoing litigation. After the lawsuit was dismissed on May 5, 1977, a groundbreaking ceremony for the new span was held on July 20, 1977, although by that time preliminary work on the new structure had already begun. To speed up the completion of the bridge, construction of the span had been split into three separate contracts: river piers, the segment of the span from Green Island to River Street in Troy, and the remaining section of the bridge in Troy including the associated relocation/reconstruction of local streets.

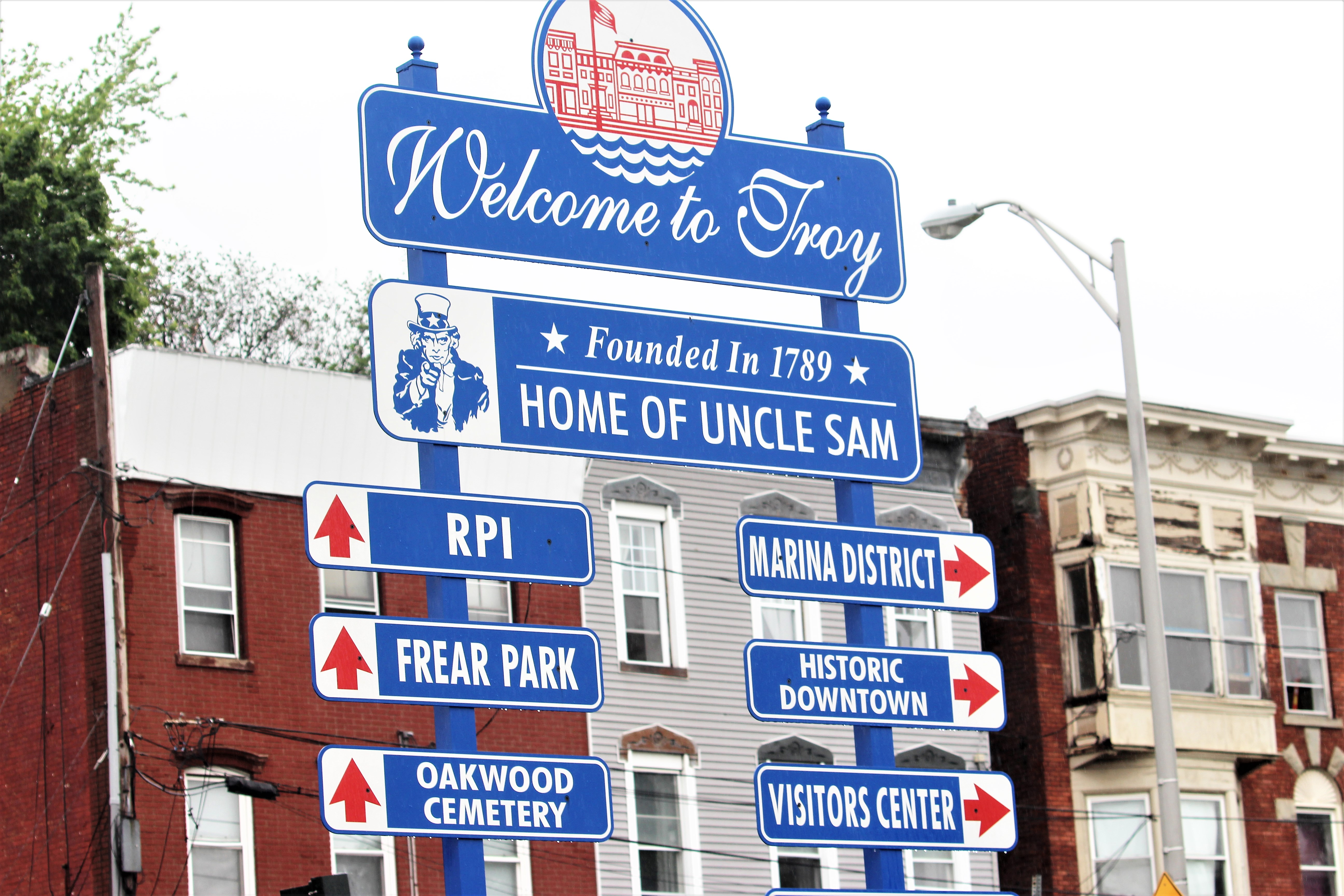
Welcome sign located near the end of the bridge at Eighth Street in Troy

The bridge's official name, a reference to the City of Troy's nickname, was selected by an elderly couple in nearby Berlin. (Note: Troy's nickname as "The Collar City" came from its relationship with the detachable shirt collar industry. The detachable collar was invented in Troy in the 1820s. By 1925, 90 percent of detachable collars were being manufactured in Troy.) Suggestions to name the structure after Uncle Sam from a bridge naming contest were not selected due to doubts of the authenticity of the legend that the name was derived from Troy resident Samuel Wilson. The official name of the structure was codified into the description of I-787 in the Consolidated Laws of New York.

When the eight-lane span opened to traffic on August 14, 1980, it became the Hudson River crossing with the second most number of traffic lanes after the George Washington Bridge. The ribbon cutting for the new structure was performed by the couple that had suggested the bridge's name. It was estimated that 2,000 people attended the opening ceremonies, which included speeches and a parade of antique cars. Troy residents and businesses—including merchants at Troy Plaza on Hoosick Street and the Uncle Sam Atrium in downtown Troy—were particularly grateful that the new bridge had opened, as the Green Island Bridge located immediately downstream of the Collar City Bridge had been destroyed by a flood in 1977 and the Congress Street Bridge had been overwhelmed with traffic congestion. (Note: A replacement for the Green Island Bridge did not open until September 12, 1981.)

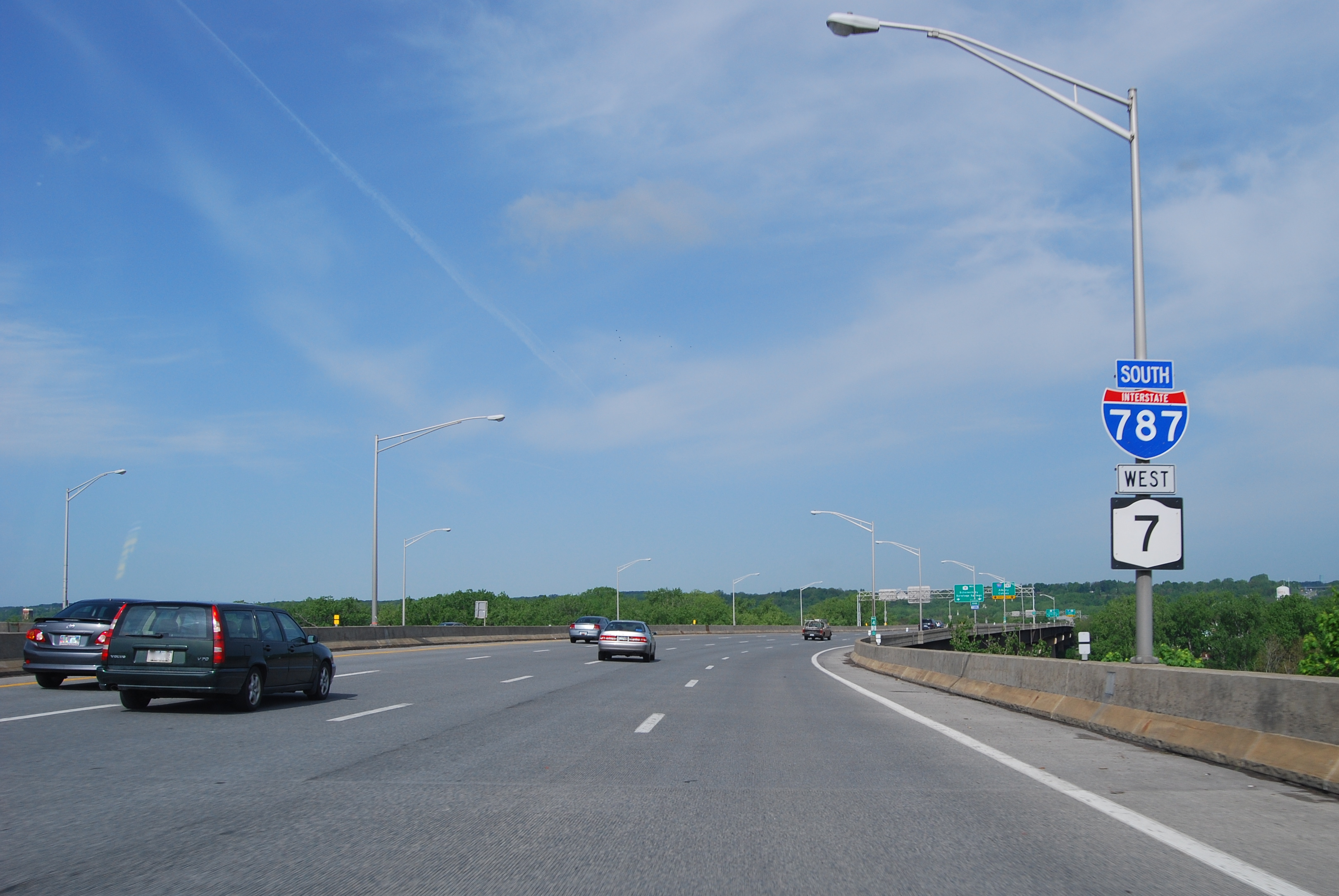
Reassurance markers for I-787 and NY 7 shown traveling west on the bridge

In December 1985, a new limited-access highway opened between the Maplewood Interchange and Exit 7 of the Adirondack Northway (I-87) in Latham. Although NYSDOT designated the route of the new highway as NY 7 and designated the former section of NY 7 between the Northway and Watervliet as NY 2, the segment of expressway between I-87 and I-787 is still commonly referred to as "Alternate Route 7".

Beginning in 2021, a series of murals was painted on the abutments of the Collar City Bridge along Hoosick Street in Troy as part of a project called the "Uniting Line". The public art project was aimed to unify the communities the bridge had divided—downtown Troy and North Central Troy—as well as revitalize the area below the structure. The following year, the history of the Collar City Bridge and Uniting Line project were featured in a documentary film about the bridge titled Bridging the Divide that premiered on WMHT-TV. The inclusion of public art in the area below the bridge was a recommendation identified in the 2020 Hoosick Hillside Study. The report also recommended the addition of a skatepark at Hoosick Street and Fifth Avenue, which was proposed by the city in 2022.

== See also ==
- List of fixed crossings of the Hudson River
