= Troy, New York =

City in New York, United States

Troy
- City
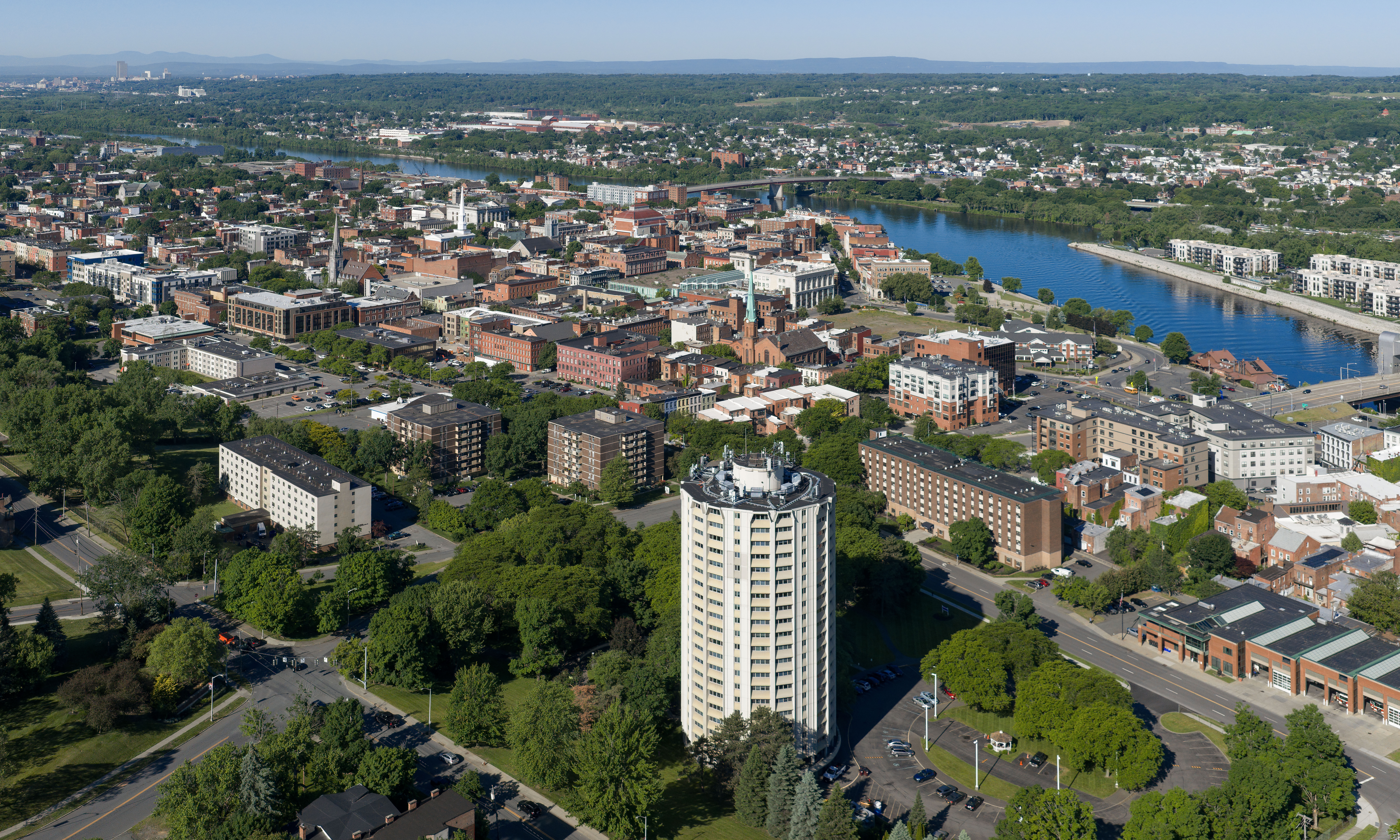
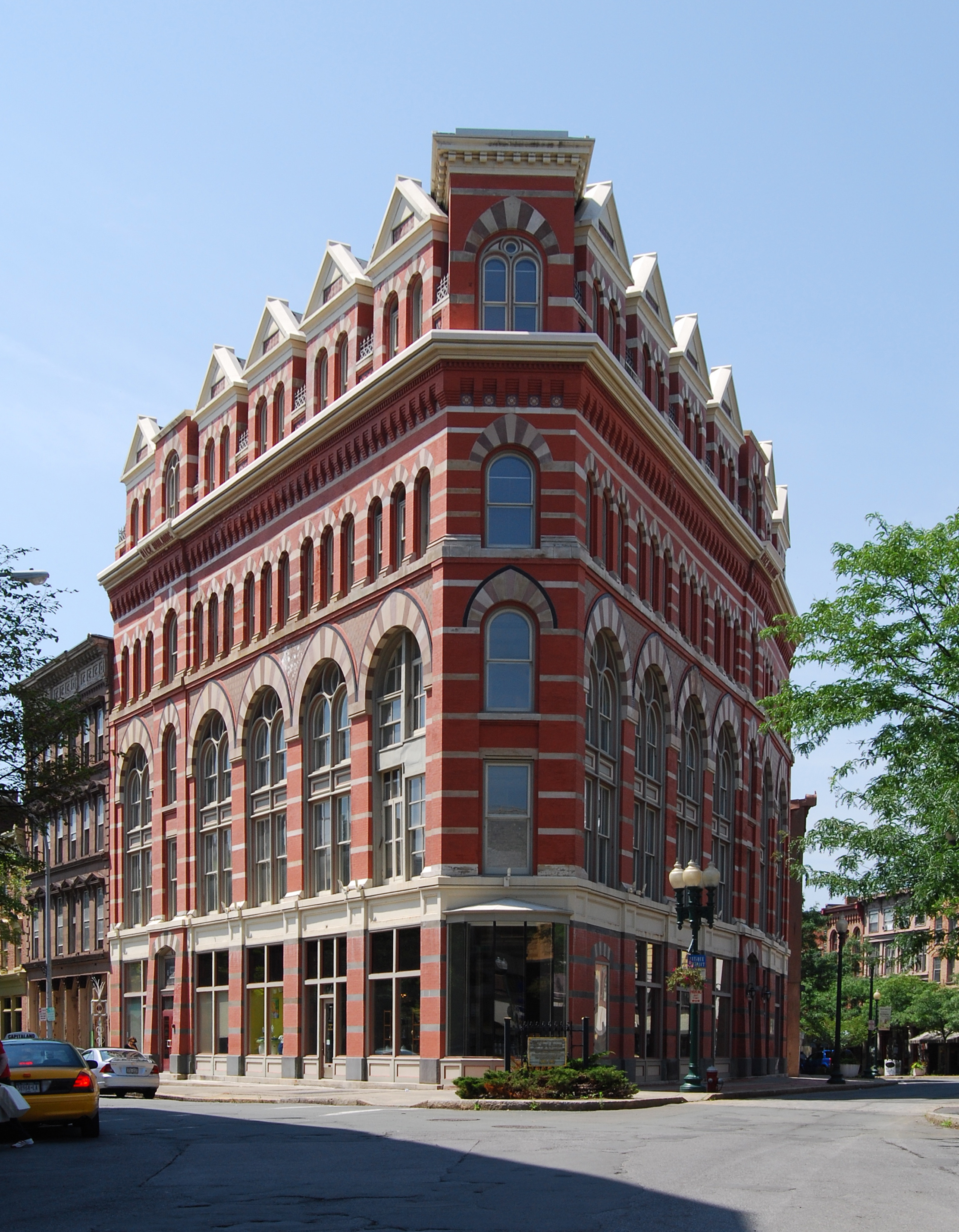
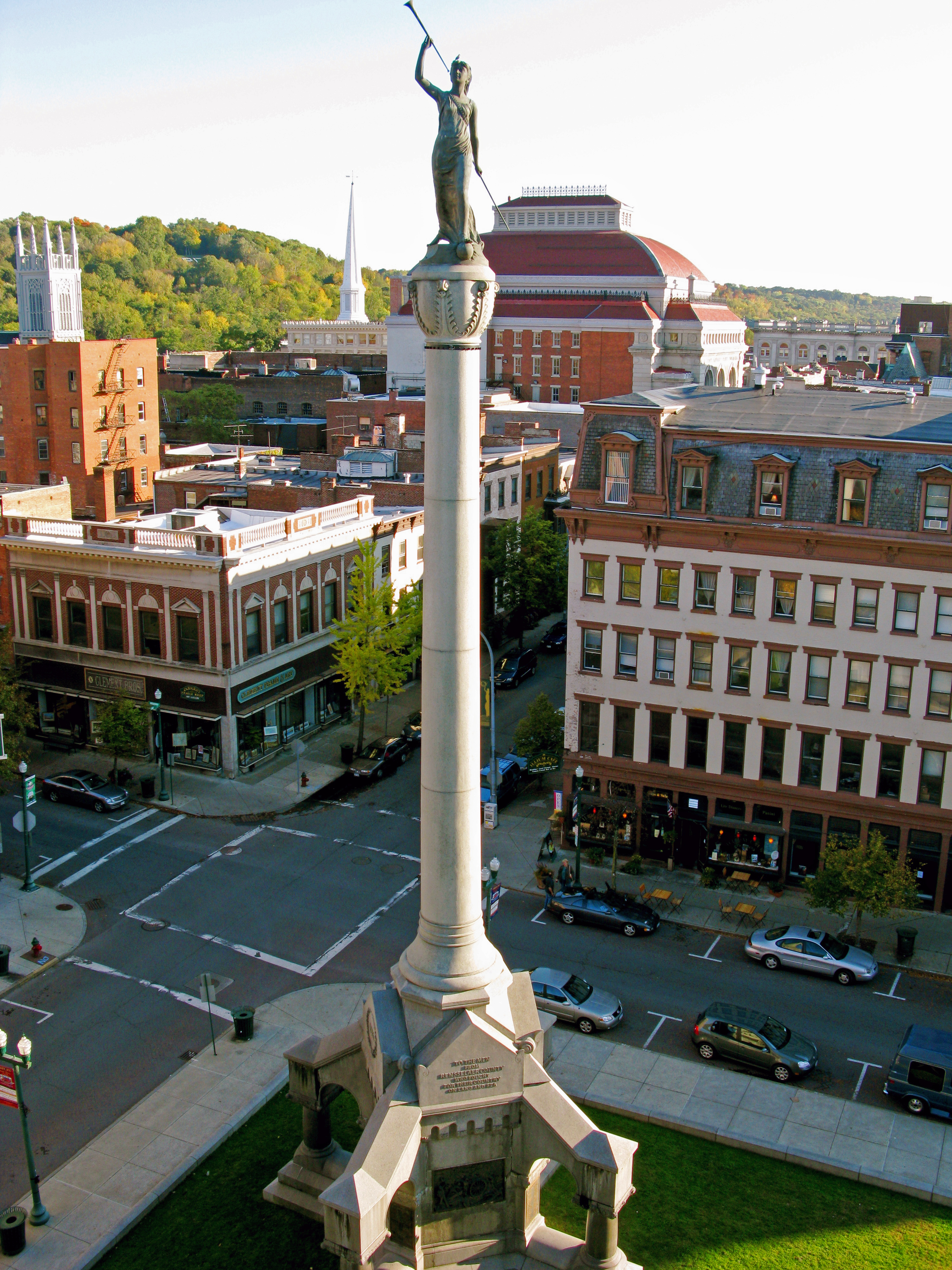
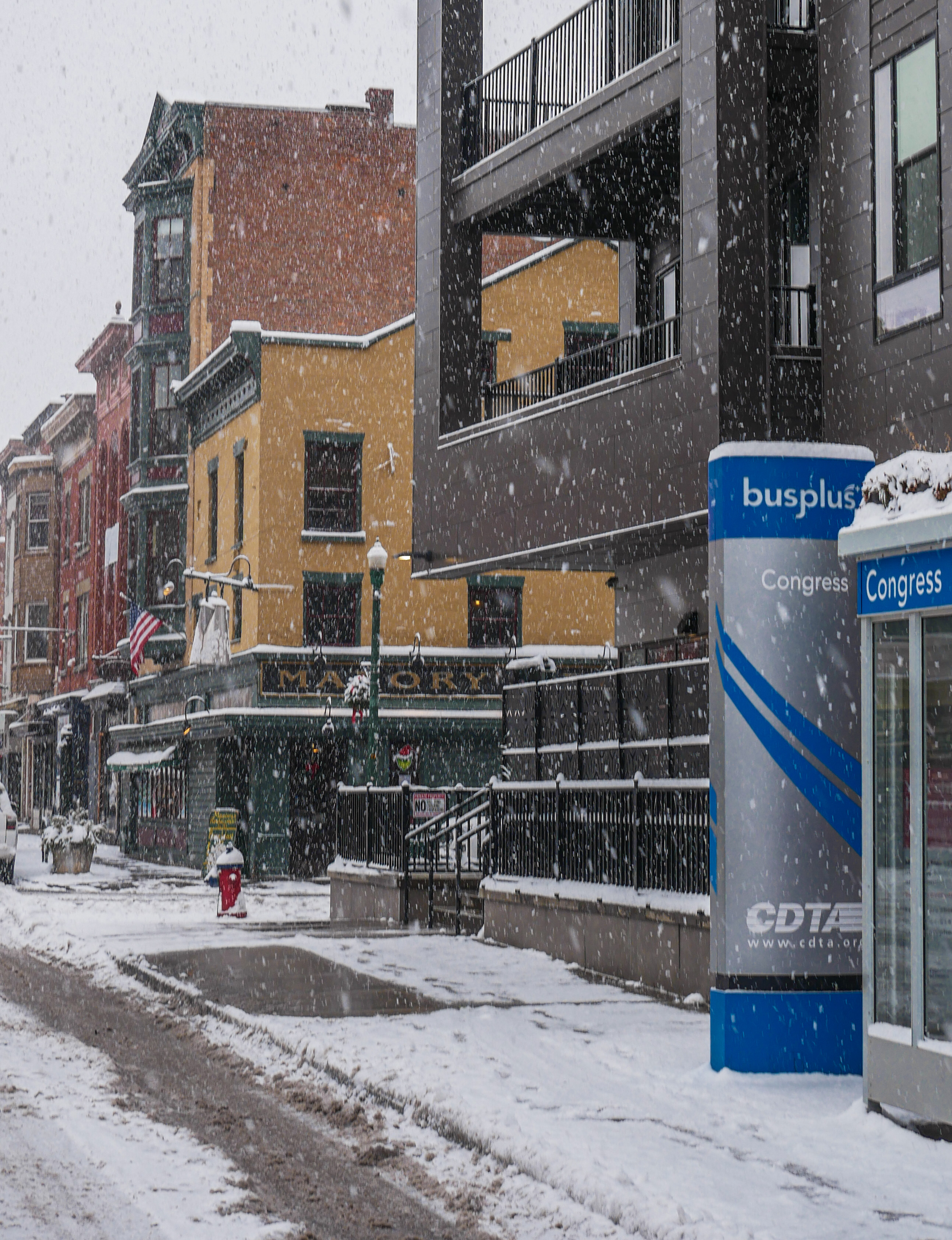
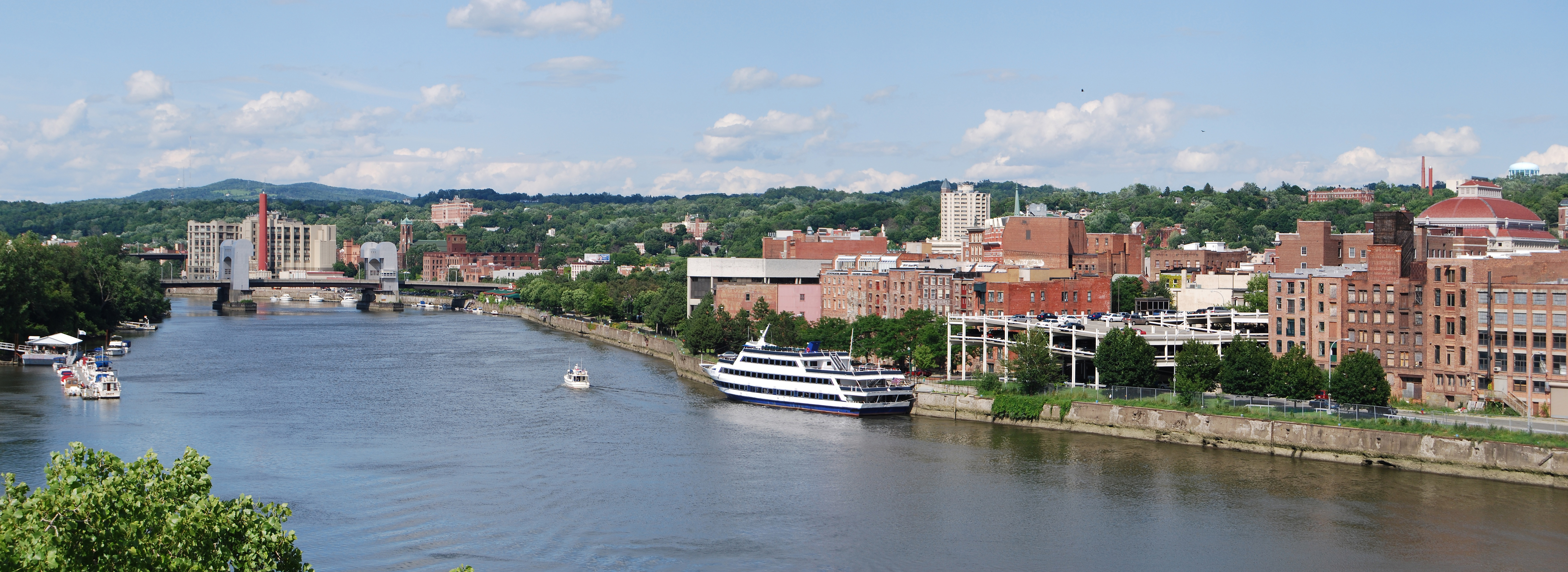
- Troy skyline Rice Building Soldiers and Sailors Monument CDTA Hudson River

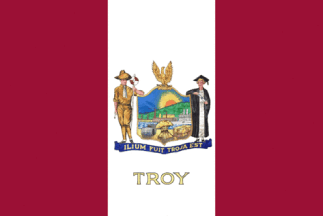
- Flag Seal
- Etymology: Classical Troy
- Nickname: The Collar City
- Motto: Ilium fuit, Troja est (Latin for "Ilium was, Troy is" also translates as "Troy was, Troy is")
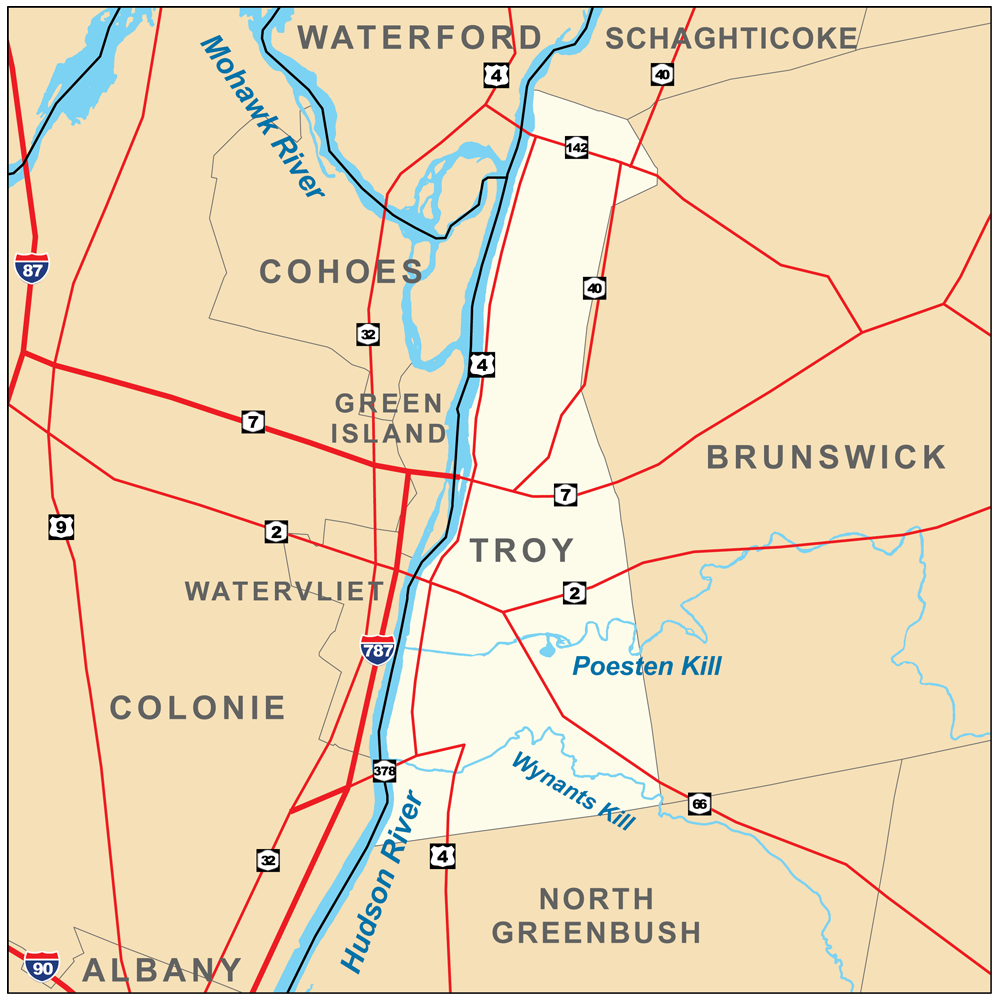
- Map of Troy and its major thoroughfares

- Location within New York Location within the United States
- Coordinates: 42°43′54″N 73°41′33″W
- Country: United States
- State: New York
- County: Rensselaer
- Settled: 1787
- Named for: Ancient Troy

Government
  - Type: Troy City Hall
  - Body: Troy City Council
  - Mayor: Carmella Mantello (R)
  - Council President: Susan Steele (D)

Area
  - City: 11.06 sq mi (28.64 km^{2})
  - Land: 10.36 sq mi (26.83 km^{2})
  - Water: 0.70 sq mi (1.81 km^{2})
- Highest elevation: 500 ft (150 m)
- Lowest elevation: 0 ft (0 m)

Population (2020)
  - City: 51,401
  - Density: 4,962.7/sq mi (1,916.11/km^{2})
  - Metro: 1,170,483
- Demonym: Trojan
- Time zone: UTC−5 (Eastern (EST))
  - Summer (DST): UTC−4 (EDT)
- ZIP Codes: 12179–12182
- Area code: 518
- FIPS code: 36-083-75484
- FIPS code: 36-75484
- GNIS feature ID: 0967902
- Wikimedia Commons: Troy, New York
- Website: troyny.gov

Troy is a city in and the county seat of Rensselaer County, New York, United States. It is located on the western edge of the county, on the eastern bank of the Hudson River just northeast of the capital city of Albany. At the 2020 census, the population of Troy was 51,401. Troy has close ties to Albany and nearby Schenectady. The three cities form a region called the Capital District, which has a population of 1.24 million.

The area had long been occupied by the Mohican Indian tribe, but Dutch settlement began in the mid-17th century. The Dutch colony was conquered by the English in 1664, renamed Troy in 1789 and was incorporated as a town in 1791. Due to the confluence of major waterways and a geography that supported water power, the American Industrial Revolution took hold in this area, making Troy reputedly the fourth-wealthiest city in America around the turn of the 20th century. As a result, Troy is noted for its Victorian architecture. Troy is home to a number of institutions of higher learning, including Rensselaer Polytechnic Institute, Hudson Valley Community College and Russell Sage College.

== History ==
=== 1500 to 1700: the Mohican and the Skiwia Native Americans ===
Prior to the arrival of Europeans, the Mohican Indians had a number of settlements along the Hudson River near its confluence with the Mohawk River. The land comprising the Poesten Kill and Wynants Kill areas—"kill" being the Dutch word for "creek" or small stream—were owned by two Mohican groups. The land around the Poesten Kill was owned by Skiwias and was called Panhooseck. The area around the Wynants Kill, known as Paanpack, was owned by Peyhaunet. The land between the creeks, which makes up most of today's downtown and South Troy neighborhood along the Hudson River, was owned by Annape. South of the Wynants Kill and into present-day Town of North Greenbush, the land was owned by Pachquolapiet. These parcels of land were sold to the Dutch between 1630 and 1657, and each purchase was overseen and signed by Skiwias, the sachem—the political leader of the Indigenous people—at the time. In total, more than 75 individual Mohicans were involved in deed signings in the 17th century.

=== 1700: Dutch and British settlement ===
The site of the city was a part of Rensselaerswyck, a patroonship created by Kiliaen van Rensselaer. Dirck Van der Heyden was one of the first settlers. In 1707, he purchased a farm of 65 acres (26 ha), which in 1787 was laid out as a village.

=== 1800s: Canals, shipping, early industrialization ===
The name Troy, after the legendary Greek city of Troy made famous in Homer's Iliad, was adopted in 1789, before which the tiny community had been known as Ashley's Ferry. The area was formed into the Town of Troy in 1791 from part of the Manor of Rensselaerswyck. The township included today's towns of Brunswick and Grafton. Troy became a village in 1801 then was chartered as a city in 1816. In the post–Revolutionary War years, as Central New York was first settled, a strong trend to classical names existed, and Troy's naming fits the same pattern as the New York cities of Syracuse, Rome, Utica, Ithaca, and the towns of Sempronius and Manlius, and dozens of other similarly named towns to the west of Troy. Troy's Latin motto is Ilium fuit, Troja est, which means "Ilium was, Troy is". (Note: Ilium fuit is the well-known expression from the Aeneid, where it is the beginning of Parthus' reply to Aeneas. Aeneid, Bk. II., 325. 30 153, and which had come to mean a complete and final end. The second half, Troja est, is a defiant declaratory statement that nevertheless, Troy still lives.)

Northern and Western New York was a theater of the War of 1812, and militia and regular army forces were led by Stephen Van Rensselaer of Troy. Quartermaster supplies were shipped through Troy. A local butcher and meatpacker named Samuel Wilson supplied the military, and according to local lore, stamped the meat barrels "U.S." which alternately was interpreted as "United States" and "Uncle Sam," meaning Wilson. Troy has since claimed to be the historical home of Uncle Sam, who is buried in the historic Oakwood Cemetery located on the northern outskirts of the city and the burial site of numerous local luminaries. The iconic Uncle Sam caricature was created by political newspaper cartoonist Thomas Nast.

On December 23, 1823, The Troy Sentinel newspaper was the first publisher of the world-famous Christmas poem "A Visit from St. Nicholas" (also known as "The Night Before Christmas" or "'Twas the Night Before Christmas"). The poem was published anonymously. Its author has long been believed to have been Clement Clarke Moore, but now is regarded by some as having been Henry Livingston Jr.

Scientific and technical proficiency was supported by the presence of Rensselaer Polytechnic Institute (RPI), one of the highest-ranked engineering schools in the country. RPI originally was sponsored by Stephen Van Rensselaer, one of the most prominent members of that family of Dutch colonial origins. RPI was founded in 1824, and eventually absorbed the campus of the short-lived liberal arts-based Troy University, which closed in 1862 during the Civil War. Rensselaer founded RPI for the "application of science to the common purposes of life," and it is the oldest technological university in the English-speaking world. The institute is known for its success in the transfer of technology from the laboratory to the marketplace.

==== Financial success and flaming destruction ====
Through much of the 19th and into the early 20th centuries, Troy was one of the most prosperous cities in the United States. Prior to its rise as an industrial center, it was the transshipment point for meat and vegetables from Vermont and New York, which were sent by the Hudson River to New York City. The trade was vastly increased after the construction of the Erie Canal, with its eastern terminus directly across the Hudson River from Troy at Cohoes in 1825. Another artery constructed was the Champlain Canal. In 1916, Troy Federal Lock opened as one of the first modern locks along the present-day canal system.

Troy has nearly been destroyed by fire three times. What was known as the Great Troy Fire of 1862 burned down the W. & L. E. Gurley Company factory, which later that year was replaced by the new W. & L. E. Gurley Building, now a National Historic Landmark: Gurley & Sons remains a worldwide leader in precision instrumentation to this day.

Troy's one-time great wealth was produced in the steel industry, with the first American Bessemer converter erected on the Wynantskill Creek, a stream with falls in a small valley at the south end of the city. The industry first used charcoal and iron ore from the nearby Adirondack Mountains. Later, ore and coal from the Midwest were shipped via the Erie Canal to Troy and were processed before being sent down the Hudson River to New York City. The iron and steel also were used by the extensive federal arsenal located—as it is today—across the Hudson at Watervliet, a community then called West Troy.

After the Civil War, the steel production industry moved west to be closer to raw materials. The presence of iron and steel also made it possible for Troy to be an early site in the development of iron storefronts and steel structural supports in architecture, and some significant early examples remain in the city.

==== Pioneering in the world of sports ====
Troy was an early home of professional baseball and was the host of two major league teams. The first team to call Troy home was the Troy Haymakers, a National Association team operating in 1871–72. One of its major players was Williams H. Craver, a Civil War veteran who was a noted catcher and also managed the team. Its last manager was Jimmy Wood, recognized as the first Canadian to play professional baseball. The Troy Haymakers team folded, and the city subsequently had no team for seven seasons. Then, from 1879 to 1882, Troy rebounded as home to the National League's Troy Trojans. They not only were competitive in the league, they fielded a young Dan Brouthers who went on to become baseball's first great slugger.

Today's sports scene is quite different. The Tri-City ValleyCats, a minor league professional baseball team, calls the Joseph L. Bruno Stadium at Hudson Valley Community College home. The RPI Engineers are an NCAA Division III sports participant except in ice hockey where it plays at the Division I level and won various championships including the national title in 1954 and 1985.

The Hudson Valley CC Vikings participate in Region III of the National Junior College Athletic Association (NJCAA) and in the Mountain Valley Athletic Conference. Russell Sage College's Gators compete at the NCAA Division III level in numerous sports and in, among various conferences, the Empire 8 Conference.

==== Politics, commerce and growth abound ====
In 1892, poll watcher Robert Ross was shot dead and his brother was wounded by operatives of Mayor Edward Murphy, later a U.S. senator, after uncovering a man committing voter fraud. The convicted murderer, Bartholomew "Bat" Shea, was executed in 1896, although another man, John McGough, later admitted he had been the shooter.

The initial emphasis on heavier industry later spawned a wide variety of highly engineered mechanical and scientific equipment. Troy was the home of W. & L. E. Gurley, Co., makers of precision instruments. Gurley's theodolites were used to survey much of the American West after the Civil War and were highly regarded until laser and digital technology eclipsed the telescope and compass technology in the 1970s. Bells manufactured by Troy's Meneely Bell Company ring all over the world. Troy also was home to a manufacturer of racing shells that used impregnated paper in a process that presaged the later use of fiberglass, Kevlar, and carbon-fiber composites.

=== 20th century: Industrialization and growth ===
In 1900, Troy annexed Lansingburgh, a former town and village whose standing dates back prior to the War of Independence, in Rensselaer County. Lansingburgh is thus often referred to as "North Troy." However, prior to the annexation that portion of Troy north of Division Street was called North Troy and the neighborhood south of Washington Park was referred to as South Troy. To avoid confusion with streets in Troy following the annexation, Lansingburgh's numbered streets were renamed: its 1st Street, 2nd Street, 3rd Street, etc., became North Troy's 101st Street, 102nd Street, 103rd Street, etc. Lansingburgh was home to the Lansingburgh Academy.

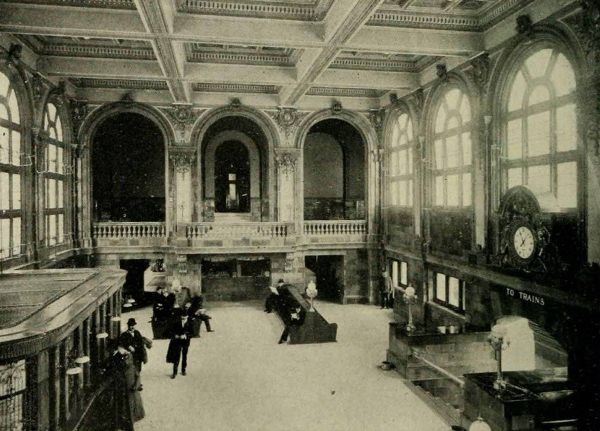
Troy's Union Depot c. 1900

In the early 1900s, the New York Central Railroad was formed from earlier railroads and established its "Water Level Route" from New York City to Chicago, via Albany. A Beaux-Arts station was constructed c. 1903. A short New York Central branch from Rensselaer connected at Troy. Also serving the station was the Boston and Maine Railroad to/from Boston and the Delaware and Hudson Railroad to/from Canada. The railroads quickly made obsolete the 1800s-constructed canals along the Mohawk. The former NYC operates today as CSX for freight service and Amtrak for passenger service, the latter operating from Albany–Rensselaer station, directly opposite downtown Albany on the east side of the Hudson River. The end of rail passenger service to Troy occurred when the Boston and Maine dropped its Boston–Troy run in January 1958. The Troy Union Station was demolished in 1958.

In addition to the strong presence of the early American steel industry, Troy also was a manufacturing center for shirts, shirtwaists, detachable collars and cuffs. In 1825, local resident Hannah Lord Montague was tired of cleaning her blacksmith-husband's shirts. She cut off the collars of his shirts since only the collar was soiled, bound the edges and attached strings to hold the false collars in place. This also allowed the collars and cuffs to be starched separately. Montague's idea caught on and changed the fashion for American men's dress for a century. Her patented collars and cuffs first were manufactured by Maullin & Blanchard, which eventually was absorbed by Cluett, Peabody & Company. Cluett's Arrow brand shirts still are worn by men across the country. The large labor force required by the shirt manufacturing industry also produced in 1864 the nation's first female labor union, the Collar Laundry Union, founded in Troy by Kate Mullany. On February 23, 1864, three hundred union members went on strike. After six days, the laundry owners gave in to their demands and raised wages 25 percent. Further developments arose in the industry when, in 1933, Sanford Cluett invented a process he called Sanforization, a process that shrinks cotton fabrics thoroughly and permanently. Cluett, Peabody's last main plant in Troy, was closed in the 1980s, but the industrial output of the plant had long been transferred to facilities in the South.

In 1906, the city supplied itself with water from a 33-inch (84 cm) riveted-steel main from the Tomhannock Reservoir. A 30-inch (76 cm) cast-iron main was added in 1914. In 2023, the city completed the first phase of installation of two 36-inch (91 cm) pipes totaling approximately 8 miles (13 km) between the reservoir and the city's Water Treatment Plant as part of a multi-year project to fully replace the existing century-old transmission line. The project began in 2021.

When the iron and steel industry moved westward to Pennsylvania around Pittsburgh to be closer to iron ore from Lake Erie and nearby coal and coke needed for the Bessemer process, and with a similar downturn in the collar industry, Troy's prosperity began to fade. After the passage of Prohibition, and given the strict control of Albany by the O'Connell political machine, Troy became a way station for an illegal alcohol trade from Canada to New York City. Likewise, the stricter control of morality laws in the neighboring New England states encouraged the development of openly operating speakeasies and brothels in Troy. Gangsters such as "Legs Diamond" conducted their business in Troy, giving the city a somewhat colorful reputation through World War II. A few of the buildings from that era have since been converted into restaurants, such as the former Old Daly Inn.

Kurt Vonnegut lived in Troy and the area, and many of his novels include mentions of "Ilium" (an alternate name for Troy) or surrounding locations. Vonnegut wrote Player Piano in 1952, based on his experiences working as a public relations writer at nearby General Electric. His 1963 novel, Cat's Cradle, was written in the city and is set in Ilium. His recurring main character, Kilgore Trout, is a resident of Cohoes, just across the Hudson River from Troy.

=== 21st century ===
Like many old industrial cities, Troy has faced the decline of its manufacturing base and the subsequent flight of residents and capital. This led to dilapidation and disinvestment until later efforts were made to preserve Troy's architectural and cultural past.

In 2014, Troy began updating its citywide comprehensive plan for the first time in more than 50 years. The two-year process is known as "Realize Troy" and was initiated by the Troy Redevelopment Foundation (with members from the Emma Willard School, RPI, Russell Sage College, and St. Peter's Health Partners). Urban Strategies Inc. (Toronto) is planning Troy's redevelopment.

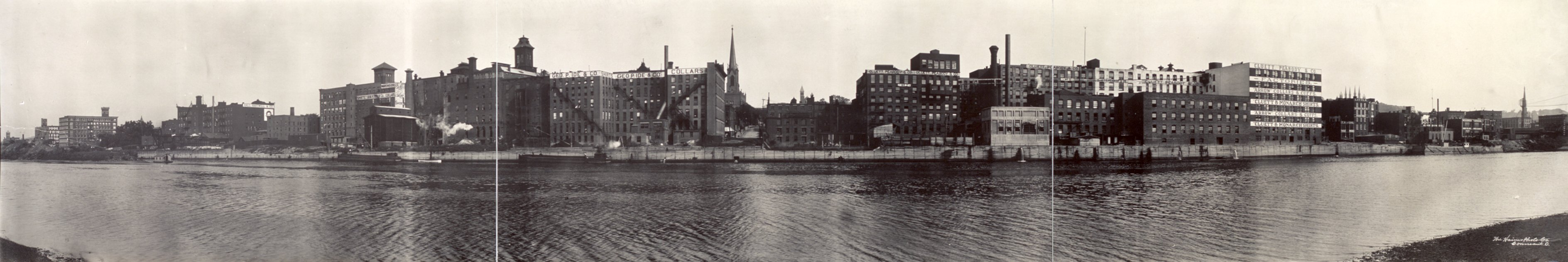
Troy, as viewed from across the Hudson River looking east, c. 1909

== Geography ==
Neighborhoods of Troy

According to the United States Census Bureau, the city has a total area of 11.0 square miles (28 km^{2}), of which 0.6 square miles (1.6 km^{2}), or 5.44%, is covered by water.

Troy is located several miles north of Albany near the junction of the Erie and Champlain canals, via the Hudson River, and is the terminus of the New York Barge Canal. It is the distributing center for a large area.

The city is on the central part of the western border of Rensselaer County. The Hudson River makes up the western border of the city and the county's border with Albany County. The city borders within Rensselaer County, Schaghticoke to the north, Brunswick to the east, and North Greenbush to the south; to the west, the city borders the Albany County town of Colonie, the villages of Menands and Green Island, and the cities of Watervliet and Cohoes. To the northwest, Troy borders the Saratoga County village of Waterford within the town of Waterford.

The western edge of the city is flat along the river, and then steeply slopes to higher terrain to the east. The average elevation is 50 feet, with the highest elevation being 500 feet (150 m) in the eastern part of the city. The city is longer than it is wide, with the southern part wider than the northern section of the city (the formerly separate city of Lansingburgh). Several kills (Dutch for creek) pass through Troy and empty into the Hudson. The Poesten Kill and Wynants Kill are the two largest, and both have several small lakes and waterfalls along their routes in the city. Several lakes and reservoirs are within the city, including Ida Lake, Burden Pond, Lansingburgh Reservoir, Bradley Lake, Smarts Pond, and Wright Lake.

=== Climate ===
Troy has a humid continental climate (Köppen: Dfa). The average temperature throughout the year is 50.9 °F (10.5 °C), with the highest average temperature in July being 74.9 °F (23.8 °C), and January being the coldest month with an average temperature of 25.5 °F (−3.6 °C). The annual precipitation is 42.09 inches (1,069 mm).

The highest temperature in New York State was recorded in Troy on July 22, 1926, when it reached 108 °F (42.2 °C).

Climate data for Troy, New York (1991–2020 normals, extremes 1932–2018)
Month	Jan	Feb	Mar	Apr	May	Jun	Jul	Aug	Sep	Oct	Nov	Dec	Year
Record high °F (°C)	66 (19)	75 (24)	86 (30)	92 (33)	97 (36)	96 (36)	108 (42)	99 (37)	96 (36)	99 (37)	83 (28)	72 (22)	108 (42)
Mean maximum °F (°C)	55.6 (13.1)	54.8 (12.7)	65.4 (18.6)	82.9 (28.3)	88.4 (31.3)	92.5 (33.6)	93.0 (33.9)	92.6 (33.7)	89.2 (31.8)	79.0 (26.1)	69.7 (20.9)	57.6 (14.2)	95.4 (35.2)
Mean daily maximum °F (°C)	34.2 (1.2)	37.1 (2.8)	46.0 (7.8)	60.2 (15.7)	72.5 (22.5)	80.5 (26.9)	85.6 (29.8)	84.1 (28.9)	77.2 (25.1)	63.7 (17.6)	51.0 (10.6)	39.7 (4.3)	61.0 (16.1)
Daily mean °F (°C)	25.5 (−3.6)	27.7 (−2.4)	36.1 (2.3)	48.9 (9.4)	60.9 (16.1)	69.7 (20.9)	74.9 (23.8)	73.1 (22.8)	65.8 (18.8)	53.4 (11.9)	42.1 (5.6)	32.2 (0.1)	50.9 (10.5)
Mean daily minimum °F (°C)	16.9 (−8.4)	18.2 (−7.7)	26.2 (−3.2)	37.7 (3.2)	49.3 (9.6)	59.0 (15.0)	64.1 (17.8)	62.2 (16.8)	54.4 (12.4)	43.2 (6.2)	33.2 (0.7)	24.7 (−4.1)	40.8 (4.9)
Mean minimum °F (°C)	−4.8 (−20.4)	−1.4 (−18.6)	8.0 (−13.3)	25.4 (−3.7)	34.9 (1.6)	46.2 (7.9)	53.3 (11.8)	50.1 (10.1)	40.2 (4.6)	29.4 (−1.4)	19.2 (−7.1)	6.7 (−14.1)	−7.5 (−21.9)
Record low °F (°C)	−23 (−31)	−17 (−27)	−11 (−24)	13 (−11)	20 (−7)	38 (3)	45 (7)	35 (2)	29 (−2)	20 (−7)	10 (−12)	−15 (−26)	−23 (−31)
Average precipitation inches (mm)	2.65 (67)	2.43 (62)	2.91 (74)	3.09 (78)	3.79 (96)	4.61 (117)	4.64 (118)	3.92 (100)	3.83 (97)	4.23 (107)	2.84 (72)	3.15 (80)	42.09 (1,069)
Average precipitation days (≥ 0.01 in)	10.1	8.1	9.2	11.3	12.1	11.4	11.4	10.1	9.5	11.9	10.2	10.3	125.6
Source: NOAA

== Demographics ==
Historical population
Census	Pop.	Note	%±
1820	5,264		—
1830	11,556		119.5%
1840	19,334		67.3%
1850	28,785		48.9%
1860	39,235		36.3%
1870	46,465		18.4%
1880	56,747		22.1%
1890	60,956		7.4%
1900	60,651		−0.5%
1910	76,813		26.6%
1920	71,996		−6.3%
1930	72,763		1.1%
1940	70,304		−3.4%
1950	72,311		2.9%
1960	67,492		−6.7%
1970	62,918		−6.8%
1980	56,638		−10.0%
1990	54,269		−4.2%
2000	49,170		−9.4%
2010	50,129		2.0%
2020	51,401		2.5%
U.S. Decennial Census 2020

=== 2020 census ===
As 2020, Troy had a population of 51,401. The median age was 31.0 years. 19.3% of residents were under the age of 18 and 12.2% were 65 years of age or older. For every 100 females there were 100.7 males, and for every 100 females age 18 and over there were 99.1 males age 18 and over.

All residents lived in urban areas.

There were 21,045 households in Troy, of which 24.4% had children under the age of 18. Of all households, 23.5% were married couples, 26.6% had a male householder and no spouse or partner present, and 38.3% had a female householder and no spouse or partner present. About 38.8% of all households were made up of individuals and 11.5% had someone living alone who was 65 years of age or older.

There were 24,325 housing units, of which 13.5% were vacant. The homeowner vacancy rate was 2.3% and the rental vacancy rate was 7.9%.

Racial composition as of the 2020 census
Race	Number	Percentage
White	31,477	61.2%
Black or African American	10,111	19.7%
American Indian and Alaska Native	195	0.4%
Asian	2,586	5.0%
Native Hawaiian and Other Pacific Islander	8	0.0%
Some other race	1,940	3.8%
Two or more races	5,084	9.9%
Hispanic or Latino (of any race)	5,453	10.6%

=== 2010 census ===
The 2010 census recorded 50,129 people, with 20,121 households and 10,947 families residing in the city. This was the first recorded population growth since the 1950 census. The population density was 4,840.1 people/sq mi, with 23,474 housing units. The racial makeup of the city was 69.7% White, 16.4% African American, 0.3% Native American, 3.4% Asian, and 4.1% from two or more races. Hispanics or Latinos of any race were 7.9% of the population.

=== Income and economy ===
The median household income in 2013 was $37,805 (NY average of $57,369), and the median family income was $47,827 (NYS average of $70,485). The median per capita income for the city was $20,872 (NY average of $32,514). About 27.3% of the population were living in poverty as of 2013.

Economically in 2020, the city's median household income had increased to $45,728 per family, with each family reporting to have 2.25 persons residing in them. The per capita income in past 12 months (in 2019 dollars), taken 2015–2019, was $25,689 with 24.4% of the population living in poverty. The poverty rate overall has decreased 3.3% since 2013.

Selected economic indicators from the 2015–2019 American Community Survey were:

In civilian labor force, total, percent of population age 16 years+, 2015–2019	61.3%
In civilian labor force, female, percent of population age 16 years+, 2015–2019	58.9%
Total accommodation and food services sales, 2012 ($1,000)(c)	94,979
Total health care and social assistance receipts/revenue, 2012 ($1,000)(c)	531,774
Total manufacturers shipments, 2012 ($1,000)(c)	88,832
Total retail sales, 2012 ($1,000)(c)	487,476
Total retail sales per capita, 2012(c)	$9,760

The education rate of Troy locals, 25 years or more, with a high school graduate or higher is 86.8% whereas the number of persons with a bachelor's degree or higher is 26.8%. Additionally, due to the increasing age of the internet, the percentage of households with a computer from 2015 to 2019 has increased to 88.5% and those with a broadband Internet subscription lies at 81.5%.

== Economy ==
Troy is known as the "Collar City" due to its history in shirt, collar, and other textile production. Until the early 1990s, Troy was home to several textile manufacturers, including Cluett, Peabody, a subsidiary of the nation's largest publicly held textile manufacturer West Point-Pepperell Inc. The detachable collar was first established in Troy in 1820 by a Mrs. Montague. Her husband was a prominent blacksmith who complained to his wife that after coming home from work he had no clean white shirts for the next day. Mrs. Montague solved this problem by cutting collars off of her husband's shirts, and reattaching clean ones for him to wear when needed. This created the important industry of detachable collars and shirts in Troy. It also created the need for buttons, as a detachable collar often left gaps between the shirt and the collar, and buttons were used to snap collars in place. Other types of apparel invented during this time included Bishop collars (which were an upright modification of the turn-down collar), dickeys, detached shirt bosoms, and separate cuffs. This industry also gave rise to the laundry industry, when the first laundry store Troy Laundry was opened at 66 North Second St. (Fifth Avenue today), and later on, the laundry industry in Troy would spark the creation of the first female union in the country. For close to a hundred years, Cluett, Peabody & Company was the largest industry in town, with a variety of products including detachable collars, arrow shirts, and other apparel. Around the early 20th century, Troy was responsible for making 90% of the collars worn in America. This was also the birthplace of the "white collar" social class, which was a more upscale working class community and the "blue collar" social class, which consisted of mostly factory workers. The industry had mostly died out by the 1960s, when most business had either gone out of business or moved south for cheaper land and labor costs. At one point, Troy was also the second-largest producer of iron in the country, surpassed only by the city of Pittsburgh, Pennsylvania.

Troy, like many older industrial cities, has been battered by industrial decline and the migration of jobs to the suburbs. Nevertheless, the presence of RPI is helping Troy develop a small high-technology sector, particularly in video game development. The downtown core also has a smattering of advertising and architecture firms, and other creative businesses attracted by the area's distinctive architecture. Uncle Sam Atrium is an enclosed urban shopping mall, office space, and parking garage in downtown Troy. RPI is the city's largest private employer.

=== Institutions and Employers ===
Rensselaer Polytechnic Institute (RPI), with more than 470 faculty members and 6,900 enrolled students in 2024, is a significant contributor to the local research and innovation economy. The 1,250-acre (510 ha) Rensselaer Technology Park hosts 77 companies employing 2,157 people. Hudson Valley Community College, with approximately 1,000 employees in 2024 is also among the city's major employers. The community college had 10,000 students enrolled in the 2025 Spring semester. Russell Sage College, which maintains a 15-acre (6.1 ha) campus in downtown Troy, employs 356 faculty and staff members and had 3,123 students enrolled in 2025.

Ten gaming studios, employing several dozen workers, operate within Troy Innovation District.

== Arts and culture ==
=== Architecture ===
Troy is home to Victorian and Belle Époque architecture.

The Hudson and Mohawk Rivers play their part, as does the Erie Canal and its lesser tributary canal systems, and later the railroads that linked Troy to the rest of the Empire State, New York City to the south, and Utica, New York, Syracuse, New York, Rochester, New York, Buffalo, New York, and the myriad of emergent Great Lakes' cities in the burgeoning United States.

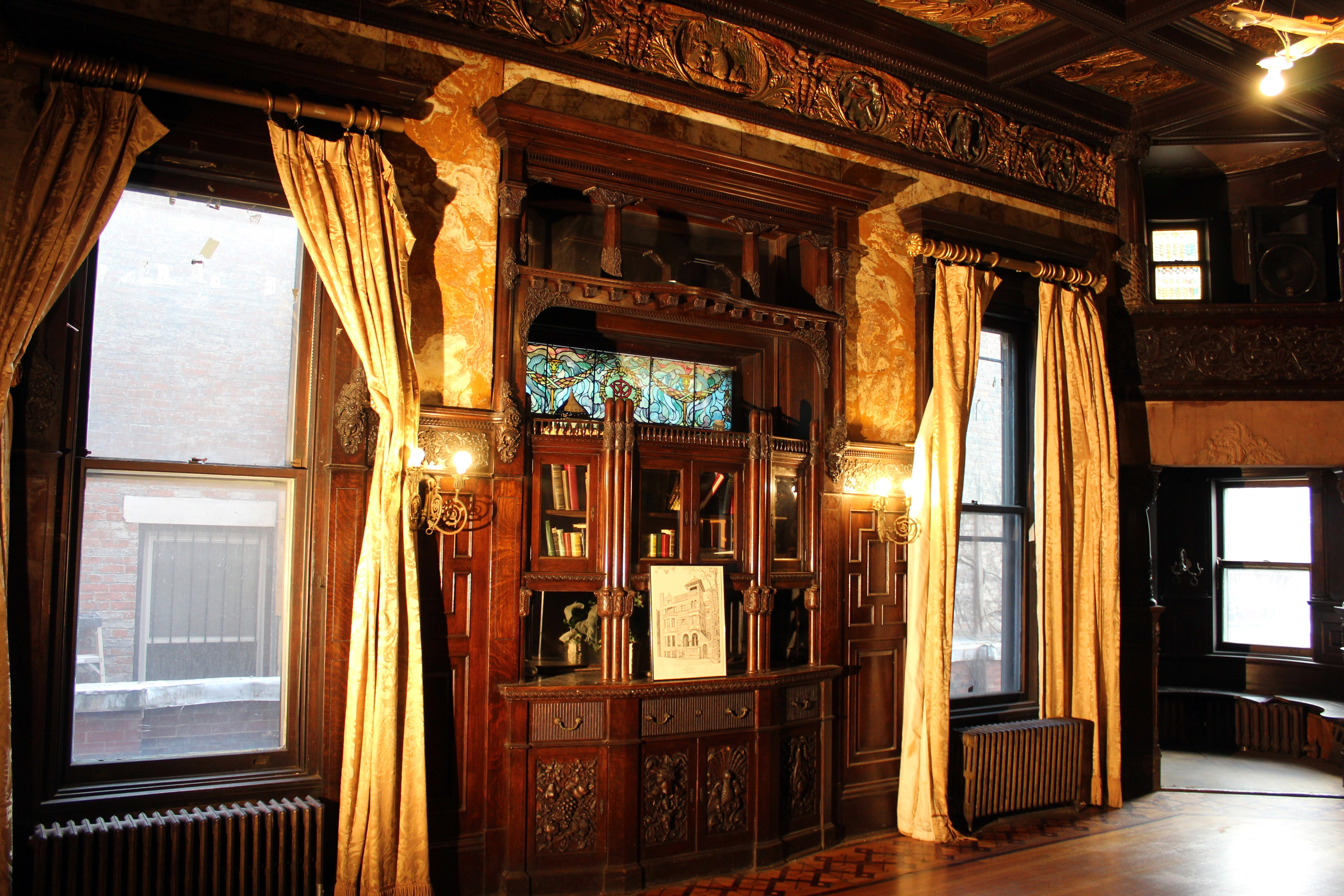
Paine Mansion (2017)

=== Notable buildings ===
- Rensselaer Polytechnic Institute
- The Emma Willard School for Girls (aka Emma Willard School)
- The Hart-Cluett Mansion
- Paine Mansion
- Russell Sage College
- Troy Public Library
- Hudson Valley Community College

Natives of Troy expressed their passion for building, using the following materials, for an array of building features:

- Iron: cast and structural iron works (facades, gates, railings, banisters, stairwells, rooftop crenellation, window grilles, etc.)
- Stone: carved hard and soft stone foundations, facades and decorative elements
- Glass: as well as in the vast array of ornate stained and etched glass works;
- Wood: fine woodwork is found in many of Troy's buildings.

Tiffany and La Farge created magnificent stained-glass windows, transoms and other decorative stained-glass treatments for their customers in Troy. With many examples of intact 19th-century architecture, particularly in its Central Troy Historic District, this has helped to lure several major movies to film in Troy, including Ironweed, The Age of Innocence (filmed partially in the Paine mansion), Scent of a Woman, The Bostonians, The Emperor's Club, and The Time Machine. In addition, the television series The Gilded Age filmed in Troy. There are many buildings in a state of disrepair, but community groups and investors are restoring many of them.

Map of Troy NY, 1877. Includes list of important locations.

Troy's downtown historic landmarks include Frear's Troy Cash Bazaar, constructed on a steel infrastructure clad in ornately carved white marble; the Corinthian Courthouse constructed of gray granite; the Troy Public Library, built in an elaborate Venetian palazzo style with high-relief carved white marble; the Troy Savings Bank Music Hall, designed in the Second Empire style, with a recital hall with highly regarded acoustic properties. There is a rich collection of Colonial, Federal, Italianate, Second Empire, Greek Revival, Egyptian Revival, Gothic Revival and other Romantic period townhouses surrounding the immediate downtown. The Hart-Cluett Mansion displays a Federal facade executed in white marble, quarried in Tuckahoe, New York. Often with foundations of rusticated granite block. Medina sandstone, a deep mud-red color, from Medina, New York, was also used.

As with many American cities, several city blocks in downtown Troy were razed during the 1970s as a part of an attempted urban renewal plan, which was never successfully executed, leaving still vacant areas in the vicinity of Federal Street. Today, however, there have since been much more successful efforts to save the remaining historic downtown structures.

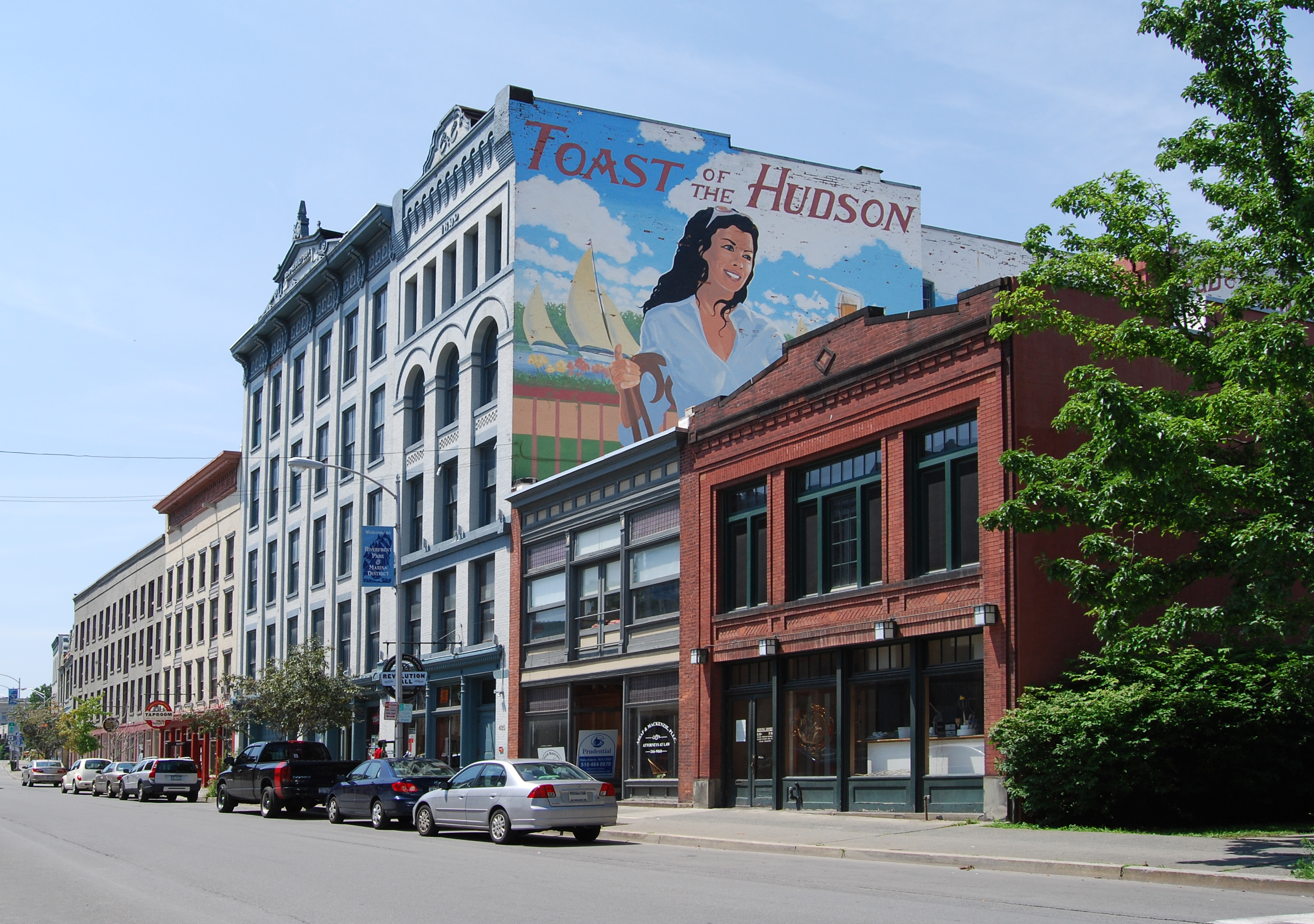
Northern River Street

Part of this effort has been the arrival of the "Antique District" on River Street downtown. Cafes and art galleries call the area home. Residents and visitors can access the area via boat and utilize the Troy Downtown Marina. As home to many art, literature, and music lovers, the city hosts many free shows during the summer, on River Street, in parks, and in cafes and coffee shops.

=== Recurring events ===
- Troy Flag Day parade – was the largest Flag Day parade in the US. It started in 1967 and ended in 2017.
- Troy River Fest – arts, crafts and music festival held every June in the downtown district.
- Uncle Sam Parade – was held near Samuel Wilson's birthday in mid-September. It was held last in 2015 after 40 years.
- The Victorian Stroll – held annually in December
- Troy Turkey Trot – Thanksgiving Day run; the oldest race in the Capital District.
- The Enchanted City – Steampunk festival in downtown Troy
- Troy Night Out – monthly arts and cultural event in the streets of Downtown Troy
- Rockin' on the River – outdoor concert series held from June to August
- Troy Pig Out – BBQ competition in Riverfront Park
- Chowderfest – chowder festival in downtown Troy
- Troy Waterfront Farmers Market – held weekly, during the summer at Monument Square and River Street, and in the winter in the Atrium

== Government ==
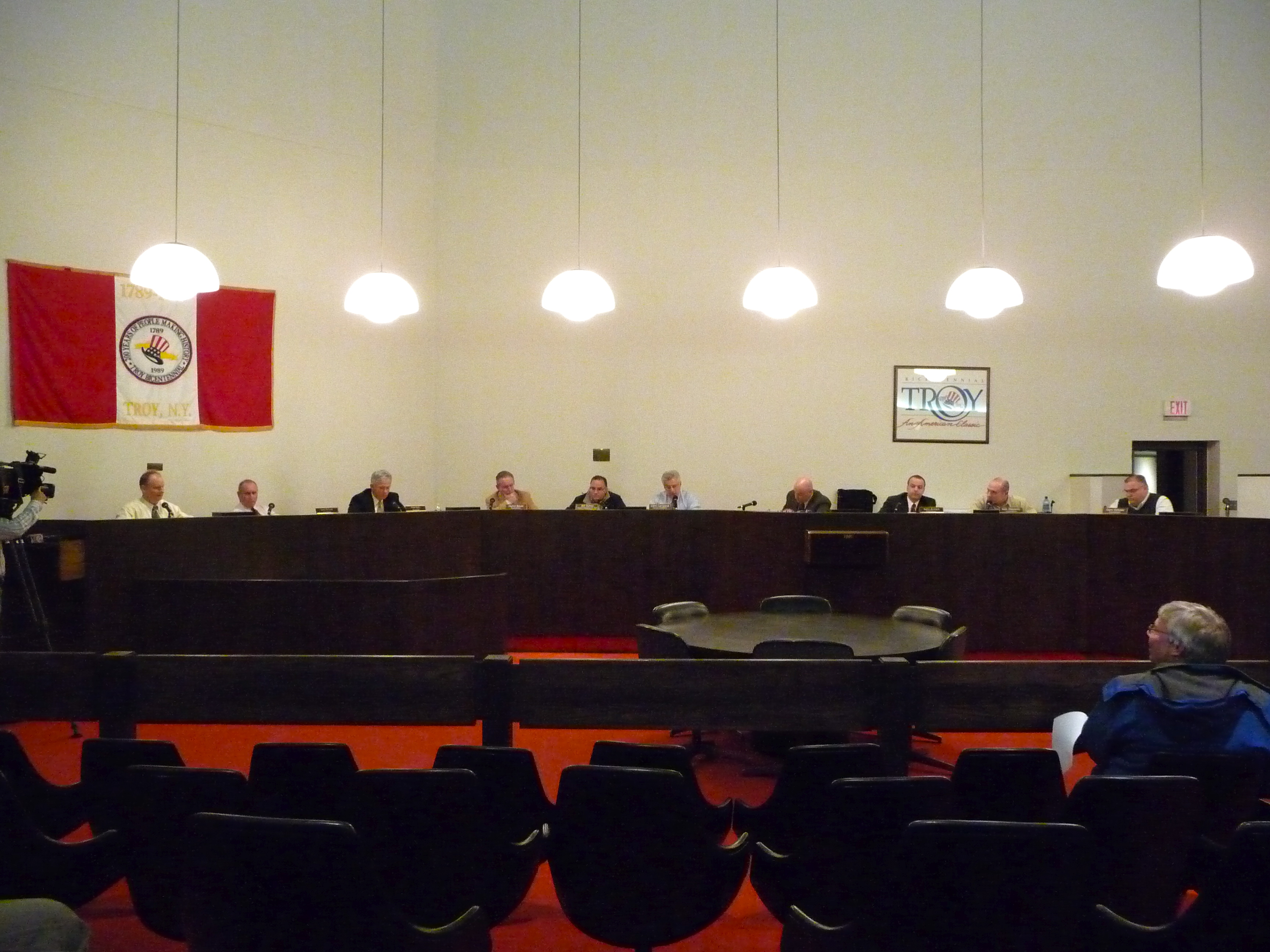
City Council meeting in the former City Hall on River Street

=== Executive branch ===
The executive branch consists of a mayor who serves as the chief executive officer of the city. The mayor is responsible for the proper administration of all city affairs placed in his/her charge as empowered by the city charter. The mayor enforces the laws of New York State as well as all local laws and ordinances passed by the city council. She or he exercises control over all executive departments of the city government, including the Departments of Finance, Law, Public Safety, Public Works, Public Utilities, and Parks and Recreation.

The mayor's term of office is four years, and an incumbent is prohibited from serving for more than two consecutive terms (eight years).

The current mayor of Troy is Carmella Mantello (R), who is serving her first term, having been elected on November 7, 2023.

==== Electoral history ====
Results from the last seven mayoral elections (an asterisk* indicates the incumbent):

- November 7, 2023 – Carmella Mantello (R) defeated Nina Nichols (D)
- November 5, 2019 – Patrick Madden* (D, W) defeated Rodney Wiltshire (G, I), Tom Reale (R, C)
- November 3, 2015 – Patrick Madden (D) defeated Jim Gordon (R, C, G, I, RF), Rodney Wiltshire (W), Jack Cox (REV)
- November 8, 2011 – Lou Rosamilia (D, W) defeated Carmella Mantello (R, C, I)
- November 6, 2007 – Harry Tutunjian* (R, I, C) defeated James Conroy (D), Elda Abate (TPP)
- November 4, 2003 – Harry Tutunjian (R, I, C) defeated Frank LaPosta (D)
- November 2, 1999 – Mark Pattison* (D, L, W) defeated Carmella Mantello (R, I, C)
- November 7, 1995 – Mark Pattison (D, C) defeated Kathleen Jimino (R, RtL, Fre), Michael Petruska (I, W), Michael Rourke (L)
- prior to the November 1995 election, the city used a city-manager form of government

=== Legislative branch ===
Troy's legislative branch consists of a city council composed of seven elected members: one at-large member who represents the entire city and acts as City Council President, and six district members who represent each of the six districts of Troy. Currently, all seats are held by Democrats.

Each of the six district council members serves a two-year term, and an incumbent is prohibited from serving for more than four consecutive terms (eight years). The City Council President serves a four-year term, and is prohibited from serving for more than two consecutive terms (eight years).

The current Troy City Council took office on January 1, 2026, and will serve until December 31, 2027. The council president is Susan Steele.

=== Political boundaries ===
The City of Troy is divided into twenty-nine (29) election districts, also known as EDs. An ED is the finest granularity political district that can be used, from which all other political districts are formed.

Other political districts that make use of these EDs include City Council Districts, County Legislative Districts, State Assembly Districts, State Senate Districts, and U.S. Congressional Districts.

==== City Council districts ====
The 29 EDs are grouped into six Council Districts, as follows:

- Council District 1: ED1–ED6
- Council District 2: ED7–ED10
- Council District 3: ED11–ED14
- Council District 4: ED15–ED18
- Council District 5: ED19–ED24
- Council District 6: ED25–ED29

==== New York State Senate district ====
All of the City of Troy is in the 43rd State Senate District, currently represented by Jake Ashby

==== New York State Assembly district ====
All of the City of Troy is in the 108th Assembly District, currently represented by John McDonald III

==== Other districts ====
All other political districts that exist in Troy consist of the entire city — all 29 EDs:

- U.S. Congressional District 20: ED1–ED29
- Rensselaer County Legislative District 1: ED1–ED29

== Education ==
The Rensselaer School, which later became RPI, was founded in 1824 with funding from Stephen Van Rensselaer, a descendant of the founding patroon, Kiliaen. In 1821, Emma Willard founded the Troy Female Seminary. It was renamed Emma Willard School (America's first girls' high school and a high-academic boarding and day school) in 1895. The former Female Seminary was later reopened in 1916 as Russell Sage College (a comprehensive college for women). All of these institutions still exist today.

In addition, Troy is home to the 10,000-student Hudson Valley Community College (part of the State University of New York system); two public school districts (Troy and Lansingburgh); three private high schools: La Salle Institute (Catholic military-style), Emma Willard School, Catholic Central High School (a regional Catholic high school in Lansingburgh section), and one K-12 charter school system, Troy Prep.

== Infrastructure ==
=== Transportation ===
==== Regional buses ====
Regional and local buses are operated by Capital District Transportation Authority (CDTA). CDTA Blue Line, Red Line and Purple Line also serves the city of Troy with Bus Rapid Transit, with regional connections to Albany, Cohoes, Waterford, and Watervliet

==== Roads ====
US 4 runs north–south through the city along River St and 3rd & 4th St. New York State Route 7 passes east–west through the city on Hoosick St, using the Collar City Bridge to cross the Hudson River. The segment of Route 7 along the Collar City Bridge overlaps with the northernmost section of Interstate 787, which officially terminates in Troy. New York State Route 2 also passes east–west on Congress St, crossing the Hudson River at the Congress Street Bridge.

==== Rail ====
The New York Central Railroad, Delaware and Hudson Railroad, Rutland Railroad and Boston and Maine Railroad provided passenger rail service to Troy. By the late 1950s, only the Boston & Maine passenger service remained. The last Boston and Maine passenger train arrived from Boston, Massachusetts in 1958. Troy Union Station closed and was demolished later that year. Amtrak serves Albany-Rensselaer station, 8.5 miles (13.7 km) to the south of Troy.

=== Fire Department ===
Troy Fire Department's 124 uniformed personnel operate out of six fire stations located throughout the city and maintain five engine companies, a rescue-engine company, two truck companies, three ambulances, a Hazardous Material response unit and two rescue boats. The department responds to approximately 9,000 calls annually, and is the hazardous material response unit for Rensselaer County.

=== Health care ===
Troy is primarily served by Samaritan Hospital, a full service 277 bed community hospital providing emergency care, surgical services and inpatient treatment at its main campus on Burdett Avenue. Troy is also home to the Samaritan Hospital - St Mary's Campus, which provides outpatient and specialty services.

== Notable people ==
- Joe Alaskey (1952–2016), voice actor, known for various Looney Tunes characters
- Dave Anderson (1929–2018), Pulitzer Prize-winning sportswriter for The New York Times, born in Troy
- David Baddiel (born 1964), comedian
- Garnet Douglass Baltimore (1859–1946), distinguished civil engineer and landscape designer, first African-American graduate of Rensselaer Polytechnic Institute
- John C. Baker (1919–1996), US Army major general
- Thomas Baker (1916–1944), U.S. infantryman, received Medal of Honor for Battle of Saipan
- James A. Barker, Wisconsin state senator
- Walton Wesley Battershall (1840–1920), Episcopal priest
- George Packer Berry (1898–1986), Dean of Harvard Medical School, born in Troy
- Nick Brignola (1936–2002), musician (internationally famous jazz baritone saxophonist), was born in Troy and lived his whole life in the area.
- Dorothy Lavinia Brown (1919–2004), African American surgeon, legislator and teacher, raised in the Troy Orphan Asylum for much of her childhood and attended Troy High School, where she graduated at the top of her class in 1937.
- Dan Bryant (1833–1875), stage name of Dan O'Brien (or possibly Dan O'Neill), co-founder of Bryant's Minstrels with his brothers Jerry and Neil.
- Henry Burden (1791–1871), originally from Scotland, engineer and businessman who built an industrial complex in Troy called the Burden Iron Works that featured the most powerful water wheel in the world
- William Carragan (1937–2024), musicologist who completed Bruckner's Ninth Symphony. Born in Brunswick, taught at Hudson Valley Community College for 35 years, and spent his last two decades back in his childhood home.
- Evelyn Cavanaugh (b. 1890s), Broadway and vaudeville dancer, actress
- Howie Charbonneau (b. 1955), soccer player
- Hadden Clark, Cannibal child murderer and suspected serial killer; Born in Troy.
- James Connolly (1868–1916), a leader of the Irish Easter Rising, lived in Troy 1903 – c. 1910; a statue of Connolly was erected in Troy in 1986
- Thomas H. Conway, Wisconsin State Assemblyman
- Charles Crocker, a railroad executive, a founder of the Central Pacific Railroad, and an associate of Leland Stanford
- Jeff Daly, architect and designer, former head of design for the Metropolitan Museum of Art
- Blanche Dayne, an actress in vaudeville from 1890s to 1920s
- Courken George Deukmejian Jr. (1928–2018), Republican politician who was the 35th Governor of California from 1983 to 1991 and Attorney General of California from 1979 to 1983
- Shaun Deeb (born 1986), poker player
- Katharine DeWitt (1867–1963), an American nurse, writer and co-editor of the American Journal of Nursing
- Abram Ellenbogen (1883–1929), American lawyer, politician, and judge
- Gary Evans (1954-1998), serial killer who killed five people during armed robberies in New York’s Capital District
- John Joseph Evers (1883–1947), baseball Hall of Fame second baseman
- Mame Faye (1866–1943), brothel mistress
- Robert Fuller (born 1933), actor, star of TV series Wagon Train, rancher, born in Troy
- Alice Fulton (born 1952), poet and author, MacArthur "Genius Grant" recipient, was born and raised in Troy; her novel The Nightingales of Troy follows a fictional Irish-American family through the 20th century in Troy
- Charles Ganimian (1926–1988), Armenian American musician and oud player
- Henry Highland Garnet (1815–1882), African-American abolitionist, minister and orator; editor of The National Watchman and The Clarion
- Uri Gilbert (July 10, 1809 – June 17, 1888) 19th century mayor and alderman of Troy and owner of Gilbert Car Company.
- Abba Goddard (1819–1873), editor of The Trojan Sketchbook
- Jay S. Hammond (1922–2005), fourth governor of Alaska from 1974 to 1982
- Tim Hauser (1941–2014), singer and founding member of the vocal group The Manhattan Transfer
- Joe Horan (1878–1961), racing driver
- Edward Burton Hughes, the Deputy Superintendent of New York State Department of Public Works from 1952 to 1967
- Theodore Judah, a railroad engineer for the Central Pacific Railroad
- King Kelly (1857–1894), professional baseball player, born in Troy
- Deborah G. King (1839–1922), Women's Crusader and Prohibition advocate; born in the county, went to school in Troy
- Ida Pulis Lathrop (1859–1937), American painter, born in Troy.
- Dennis Mahoney (born 1974), author, born in Troy
- William L. Marcy (1786–1857), governor, U.S. senator, U.S. Secretary of State
- Edward P. McCabe (1850–1920), African American settler, attorney and land agent, born in Troy
- Herman Melville (1819–1891), author (Moby Dick), from 1838 to 1847 resided in Lansingburgh
- John Morrissey (1831–1878), bare-knuckle boxer, U.S. representative, co-founder of Saratoga Race Course
- Kate Mullany (1845–1906), Irish-born labor organizer, founder of the Collar Laundry Union
- James Mullowney, Wisconsin State Assemblyman
- Edward Murphy Jr. (1836–1911), mayor, U.S. senator
- Florence Nash (1888–1950), actress
- Mary Nash (1884–1976), actress
- Mary Louise Peebles (1833–1915), author of children's books
- Cicero Price (1805–1888), United States Navy commodore who fought in the American Civil War and was commander of East India Squadron, resided in Troy for 36 years
- Jacob S. Raisin (1878–1946), rabbi
- La Mott W. Rhodes (1843–1890), lawyer and member of the New York State Assembly
- Don Rittner, Historian, author, film maker
- George G. Rockwood (1832–1911), celebrity photographer
- Richard Selzer (1928–2016), surgeon and author, was born in Troy; his memoir Down from Troy recounts his experiences there as the son of a physician
- Bernard Shir-Cliff (1924–2017), editor
- Kate Simmons (1850–1926), composer
- Jeanie Oliver Davidson Smith (1836–1925), poet, romancist
- Horatio Spafford (1828–1888), composer of the well-known Christian hymn "It Is Well With My Soul", was born in Lansingburgh (now Troy)
- Maureen Stapleton (1925–2006), Academy Award-winning actress of film, stage and television
- Lavinia Stoddard (1787–1820), poet, school founder
- John J. Taylor, U.S. Congressman
- C. Whitney Tillinghast 2nd, Adjutant General of New York
- Mike Valenti, radio commentator
- Joseph M. Warren, U.S. Representative for New York
- Amy Wax (born 1953), law professor
- Harriet Hilreth Weeks (1875–1939), Wisconsin state legislator
- Samuel Wilson (1766–1854), a butcher and meatpacker during War of 1812 whose name is believed to be the inspiration for the personification of the United States known as Uncle Sam
- C. Mortimer Wiske (1853–1934), choral conductor, organist, and composer
- Russell Wong (born 1963), actor
- Duke Zeibert (1910–1997), restaurateur
