= Troy University (New York) =

University in New York, 1858–1861

- Active: 1858–1861
- Location: Troy, New York, United States

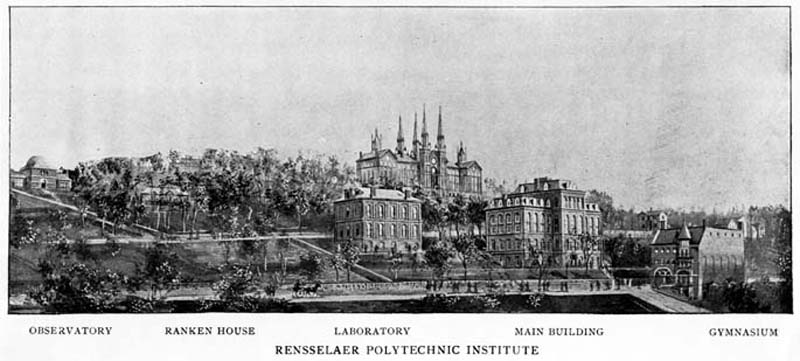
1896:The large building at the top of the hill belonged to Troy University. The early RPI campus is seen in the foreground.

Troy University was a short-lived university established at Troy, New York in 1858 under the auspices of the Methodist Episcopal Church. The school closed in 1861. The building that housed the university remained a prominent Troy landmark until 1969. On the site now is Rensselaer Polytechnic Institute's Folsom Library.

== History ==
There were initial plans for the founding of a college in Troy in 1853, and the plan for organization was adopted in 1854. The New York State Regents issued a provisional charter on April 13, 1855, to the educational board of the Methodist Episcopal Church. The original plan was for a four-year college course and an additional university course of "Lectures upon the higher branches of Science and literature, extending through two years". There also were unrealized plans for a school of Theology. A 36-acre (150,000 m^{2}) property was bought including most of Mount Ida in Troy, and a large building of Byzantine architecture was erected.

The university opened for students on September 9, 1858, and the institution remained opened for about three years. On representations made to the Board of Regents by the President of the Board of Trustees, and by the Acting President of the faculty, the charter of Troy University was made absolute on March 18, 1861. Troy University was considered firmly enough established to allow for the 1859 creation of the Kappa Phi chapter of Delta Kappa Epsilon chartered March 2, 1860.

The administration of the university raised funds by selling scholarships, which were a right to attend in the future based on a current dollar amount. Apparently the inflationary period of the early 1860s destroyed the financial stability of the university. Sometime in 1862, the property's mortgage was foreclosed upon, and the site was purchased by St. Mary's Church of Albany. The Catholic Church maintained a seminary on the grounds, known as "St. Joseph's Theological Seminary of the Province of New York." In 1896, it became a Scholasticate of the Christian Brothers. The remaining thirteen students of Troy University were admitted to the degree of Bachelor of Arts at Wesleyan University in Middletown, Connecticut

St. Joseph's Seminary trained hundreds of priests until it closed during the 1890s. The building was subsequently used for a variety of purposes including housing orphans for a time.

The huge four-story building, with its four tall spires and Byzantine architecture, was an imposing feature of the Troy skyline until it was razed in 1969. The building was purchased by RPI in 1958 and was renamed the "University Building". The School of Management, the Public Relations department and a portion of the Physics department occupied the first two floors. The upper floors were closed off due to concerns of structural instability. The Folsom Library was constructed on the site in 1976.
