= John N. A. Griswold =

American China trade merchant, industrialist, and diplomat

- Griswold c. 1900

President of the Illinois Central Railroad
- In office 1855–1855
- Preceded by: William P. Burrall
- Succeeded by: William H. Osborn

United States Consul at Shanghai
- In office 1847–1854
- Preceded by: Robert C. Murphy
- Succeeded by: Henry G. Wolcott

Personal details
- Born: John Noble Alsop Griswold; May 29, 1822 New York City, New York, U.S.
- Died: September 18, 1909 (aged 87) Newport, Rhode Island, U.S.
- Spouse: Jane Louisa Emmet (m. 1860; died 1909)
- Relations: See Griswold family
- Children: 5
- Parent(s): George Griswold; Maria Matilda Cumming Griswold

John Noble Alsop Griswold (May 29, 1822 – September 18, 1909) was an American China trade merchant, industrialist, and diplomat.

== Early life ==
Griswold was born in New York City on May 29, 1822. He was the son of George Griswold (1777–1859), who invested heavily in land speculation, and his second wife, Maria Matilda (née Cumming) Griswold (1792–1880). Among his siblings was brother George Griswold Jr. (father of Frank Gray Griswold and Mariana Griswold Van Rensselaer), and four sisters, Maria Griswold (who married George Winthrop Gray), Sarah Helen Griswold (who married Russell & Co. partner John Cleve Green), Cornelia Woodhull Griswold (who married Joseph Woodward Haven, grandfather of George G. Haven Jr.), and Matilda Elizabeth Griswold (who married Frederick Theodore Frelinghuysen, a U.S. Senator who became the Secretary of State).

His paternal grandfather was Nathaniel Griswold, a member of the Connecticut branch of the Griswold family who moved to New York City in 1796. His paternal aunt, Catherine Anne Griswold, was married to Pierre Lorillard III, making Pierre Lorillard IV, Catherine Lorillard Kernochan, Mary Lorillard Barbey, George Lyndes Lorillard, and Eva Lorillard Kip his first cousins.

== Career ==
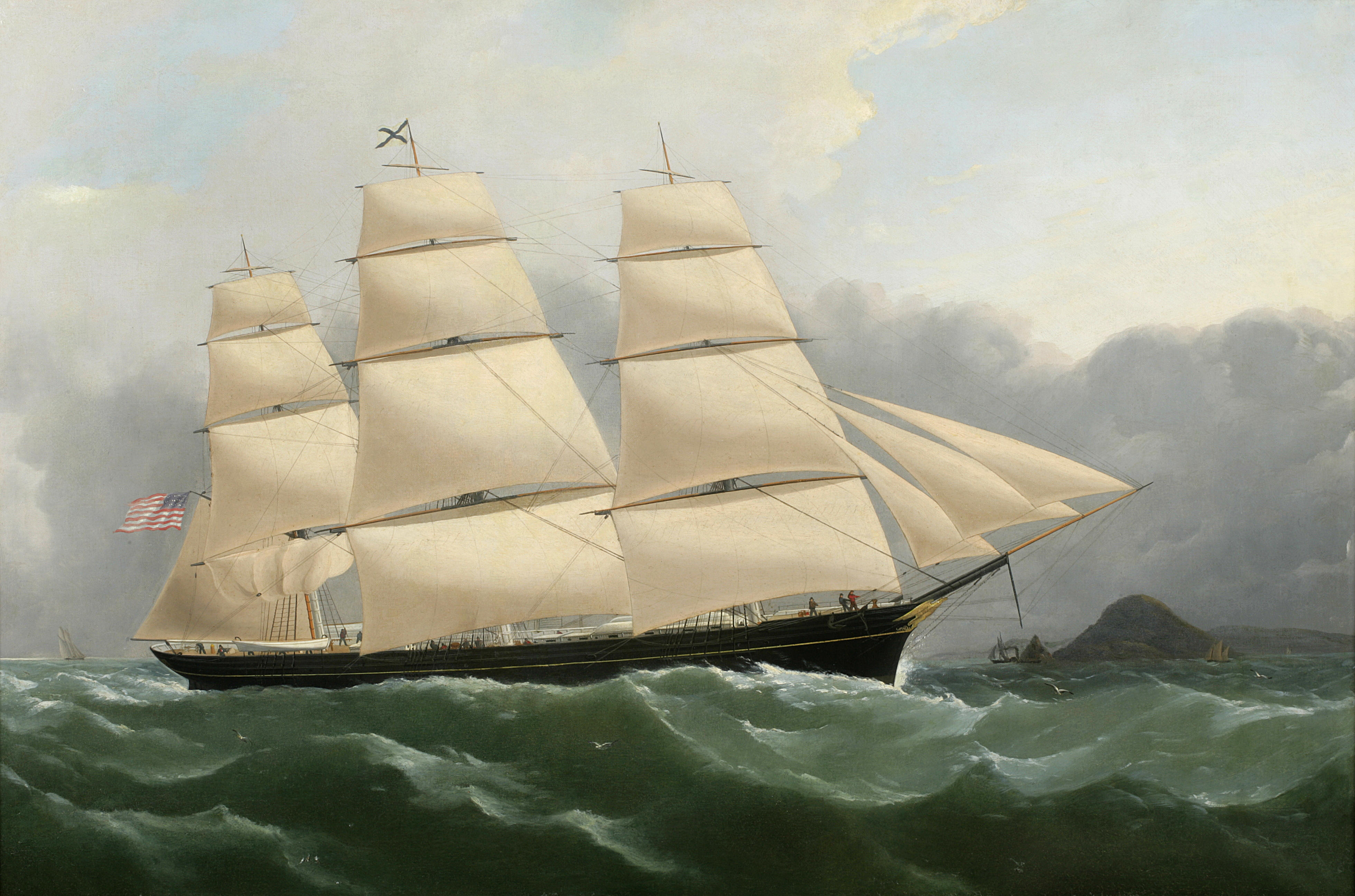
The clipper ship "Challenge" of the N.L. & G. Griswold fleet.

House flag of N. L. & G. Griswold

His father and uncle, Nathaniel Lynde Griswold, founded the N.L. & G. Griswold Company to import sugar and rum from the Caribbean on clipper ships. Eventually, they expanded to the China Trade, capturing a large share of the 19th century tea market. The firm was referred to as "the great New York mercantile house of N.L. & G. Griswold, known to their rivals as "No Loss and Great Gain Griswold," importers of rum, sugar, and tea."

In 1847, Griswold traveled to East Asia and, within a year, was appointed United States consul at Shanghai, serving in that role until 1854.

Upon his return to America, he helped develop several prominent railroads, serving as president of the Illinois Central Railroad and chairman of the board of directors of the Chicago, Burlington and Quincy Railroad. He was a Vice President in China of the Medical Missionary Society.

After moving to Newport, Griswold used his influence to encourage local development of land and businesses including the Newport and Wickford Steamboat and Railroad Company, and the Newport Casino. He acquired commercial wharves, large holdings on Coggeshall and Bellevue Avenues, and the Berkeley Block.

== Personal life ==
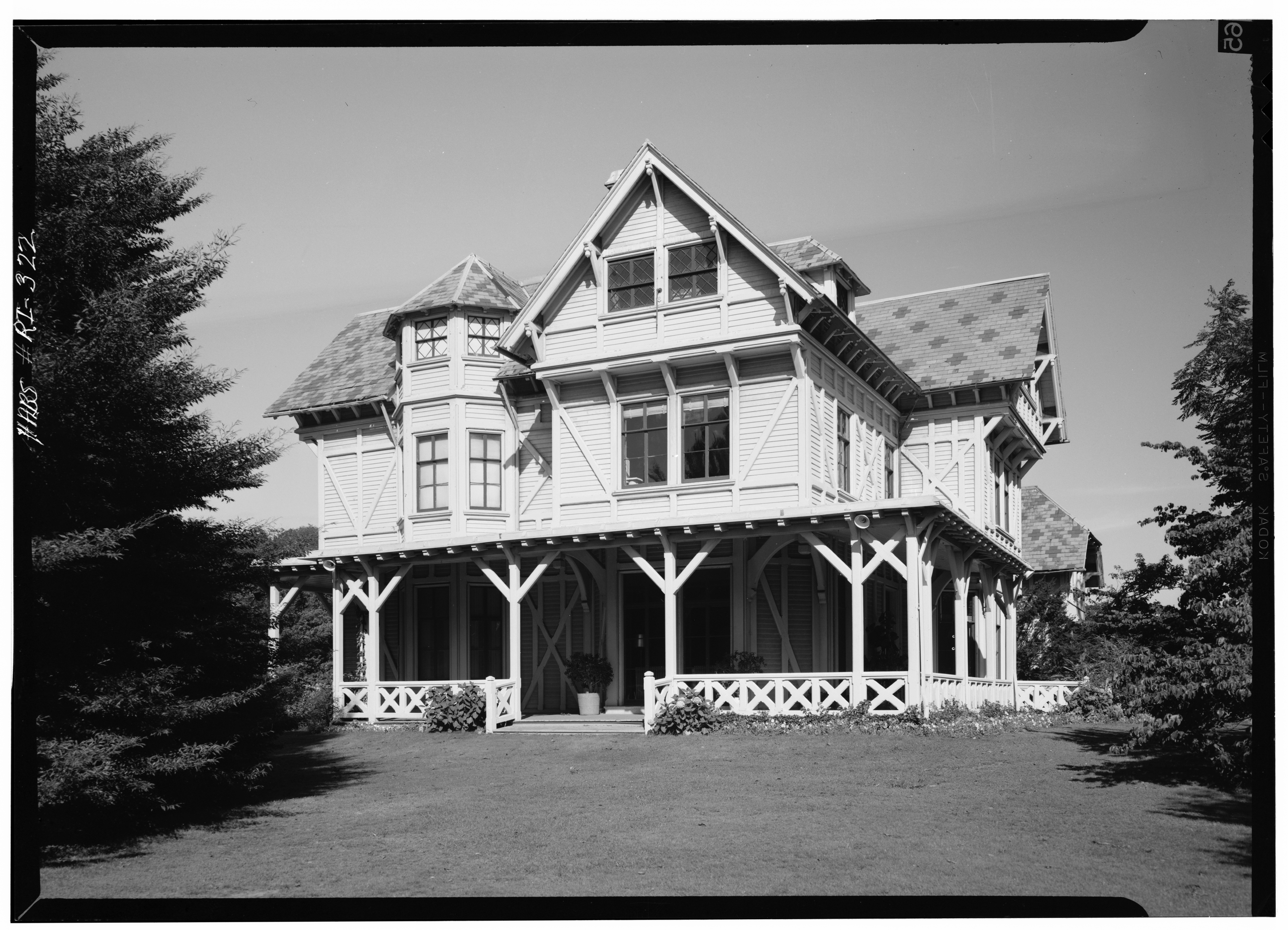
The John N. A. Griswold House, 1933.

On February 29, 1860, Griswold was married to Jane Louisa Emmet (1832–1909) at St. Mark's Church in New York City. Jane, who grew up at Morea in Charlottesville, Virginia, was the daughter of Mary Byrd (née Tucker) Emmet and John Patten Emmet, the first professor of natural history at the University of Virginia who was a son of Thomas Addis Emmet and nephew of Robert Emmet, the advocate for Irish independence. Her brother was Dr. Thomas Addis Emmet, a prominent gynecological surgeon and author, and William Jenkins Emmet, father of painter Lydia Field Emmet. Together, they were the parents of:

- Minnie Griswold (1861–), who married John Murray Forbes Jr. (1844–1921), brother of Francis Blackwell Forbes, in 1882.
- Richard Alsop Griswold (1863–1864), who died young.
- John Noble "Jack" Griswold (1865–1895), a well known clubman who died in Colorado Springs.
- Florence Temple Griswold (1867–1937), who married Major Horatio Robert Odo Cross, a surgeon in the British Grenadier Guards, on April 30, 1892.
- George Griswold II (1870–1902), (Note: His youngest son was born Addis McEvers Griswold but changed his name to George Griswold in 1890.) a Harvard lawyer who committed suicide in 1902.

In 1863, the Griswold's moved to Newport, Rhode Island where he commissioned what is today known as the John N. A. Griswold House, located at 76 Bellevue Avenue. It has served as the home of the Newport Art Museum since the early 1960s. Griswold had purchased the lot from Rowland R. Hazard Jr. and Margaret E. Hazard of Newport on November 25, 1862. While the home was being built, they lived at Kingscote (the home's owner, George Noble Jones, went south during the U.S. Civil War). The Griswold home was designed by Richard Morris Hunt and is one of the earliest American Stick style buildings.

His wife died at 129 West 59th Street, their New York residence, on January 19, 1909. Griswold died several months later at his home in Newport on September 18, 1909. He was buried at Island Cemetery in Newport. His estate was reportedly valued in excess of $25,000,000.

=== Descendants ===
Through his eldest daughter, he was the grandfather of Gordon Forbes (b. 1883), John Griswold Forbes (1885–1887), Janet Forbes (b. 1888), Howell Forbes (b. 1891), and John Murray Forbes (b. 1893).
