= John Griswold =

John Griswold may refer to:

- John Augustus Griswold (1818–1872), American businessman and politician from New York
- John Ashley Griswold (1822–1902), attorney, judge and politician from New York
- John N. A. Griswold (1822–1909), American China trade merchant, industrialist, and diplomat
- John Griswold (pen name Oronte Churm; b. 1963), American non-fiction writer, editor, lecturer, teacher
