= Griswold family =

American political family

Griswold Family
- Current region: United States, England
- Origin: Solihull, England
- Members: Matthew Griswold, Roger Griswold, John Augustus Griswold
- Connected families: Wolcott, Forbes, Bradford, Gardiner
- Estates: Malvern Hall, Griswold Point, John N. A. Griswold House

The Griswold family (/ˈɡrɪzwɔːld, -wəld/) is an American political family from Connecticut and New York of English descent. The family's fortune originates from the 19th century industrial and merchant pursuits. They tend to be Republican, but a few of them support the Democratic Party.

== Family origins ==
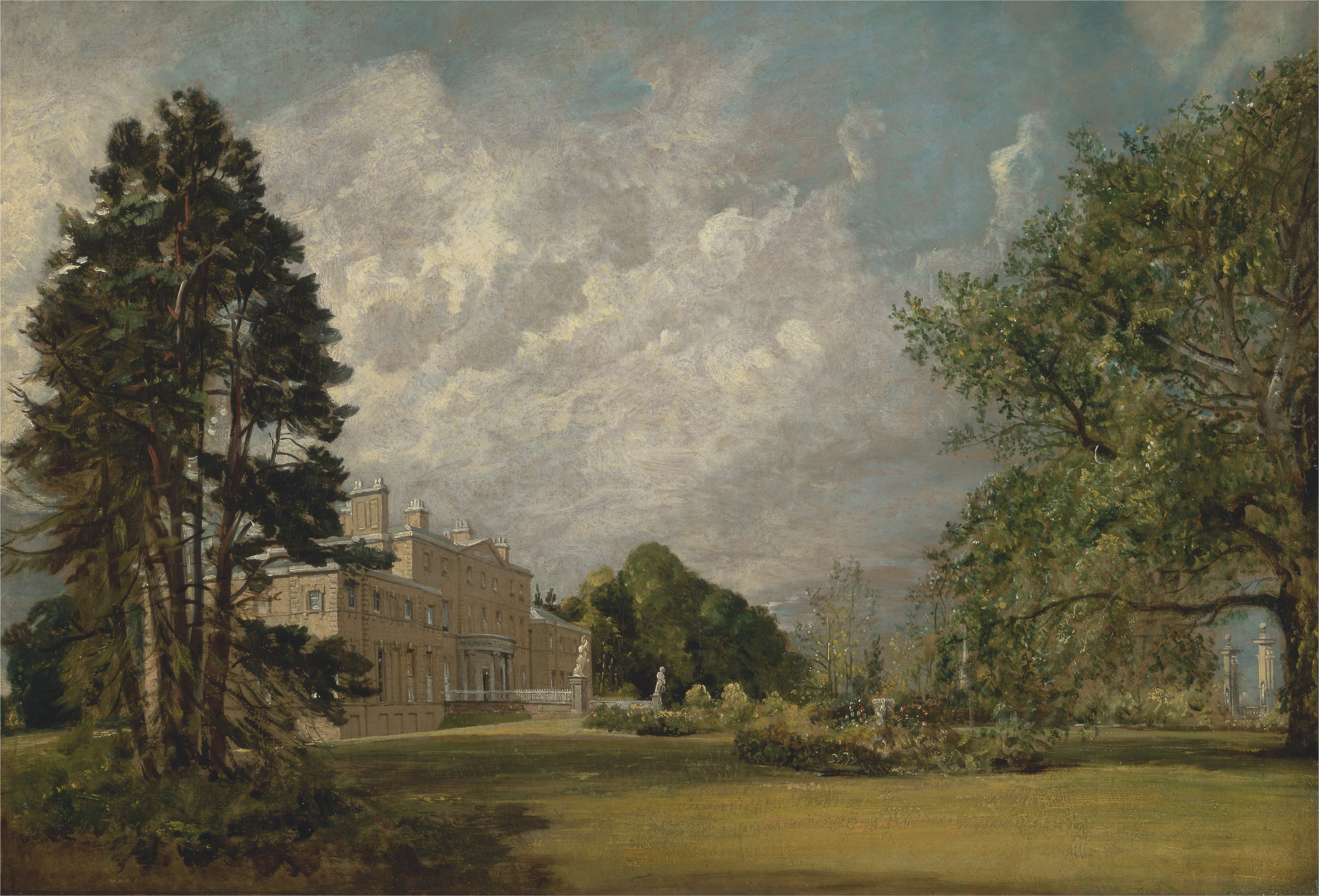
Malvern Hall by John Constable, 1821. Malvern Hall – Seat of the English Griswold family

The Griswold family originates from Solihull, England, where they lived for centuries as greyhound breeders, which were a favorite of King Edward I of England.

The first members of the family to arrive in America were the Puritan half-brothers Edward and Matthew Griswold, landing initially at Dorchester, Massachusetts in 1639 and continuing on as part of the group of colonists settling Windsor, Connecticut. In 1646, Matthew married Anna Wolcott and moved to Old Saybrook, Connecticut. He was later Deputy and Commissioner of Lyme, Connecticut, quickly amassing thousands of acres of land and becoming one of the richest men in the colony. Edward Griswold remained in Windsor and played pivotal roles in the early politics of the colony. Many of his descendants moved west to New York following the American Revolution and founded the New York branch of the family, from whom Congressman John Augustus Griswold is descended.

== Legacy and accumulation of wealth ==
=== Politics ===
Many members of the family were influential in state and national politics. During the colonial era, the Griswolds were one of a roughly half-dozen families which governed Connecticut state politics. In 1801, the Hartford Courant called "Griswold" one of the most "revered and ancient families" of Connecticut.

=== Industry ===
John Augustus Griswold of the New York branch of the family made a considerable fortune in the iron and steel industry, forming the Albany and Rensselaer Iron and Steel Works of Troy, New York. During the American Civil War, Griswold financed at his personal expense the USS Monitor and later engaged his iron business in the production of other Monitor class ironclad ships. Griswold later become president of the Troy and Lansingburgh Railroad, of the Troy and Cohoes Railroad and of the New Orleans, Mobile and Texas Railroad.

Matthew Griswold VII, grandson of governor Roger Griswold, founded the Griswold Manufacturing Company of Erie, Pennsylvania, manufacturers of the Griswold cast-iron products.

Samuel Griswold, a descendant of settler Edward Griswold, moved to Georgia and was notable for producing weapons for the Confederate Army.

=== China trade and shipping ===
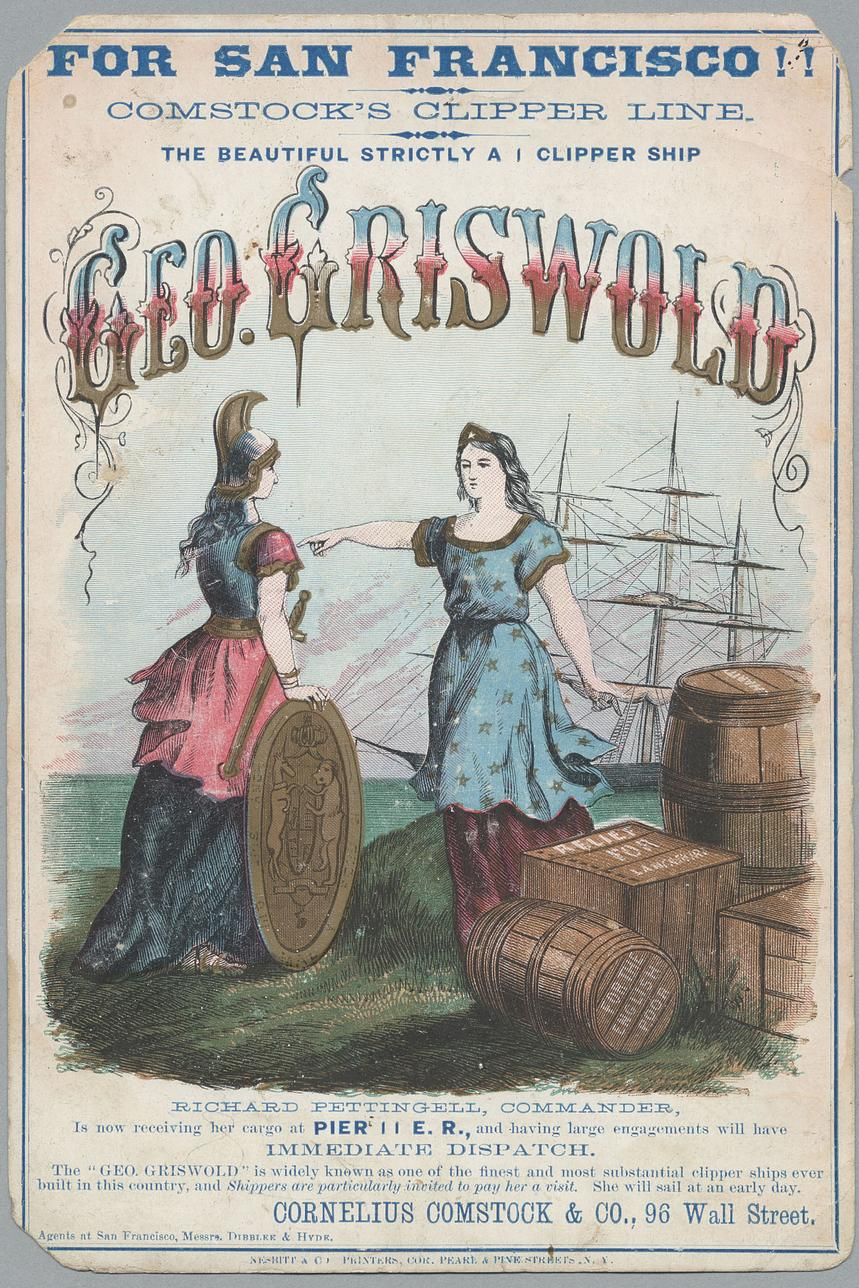
N. L. and G. Griswold donated the service of the George Griswold which left New York for Liverpool in January 1863 with a cargo for the relief of Lancashire working men. Cargo donated by the International Relief Committee and the New York Produce Exchange.

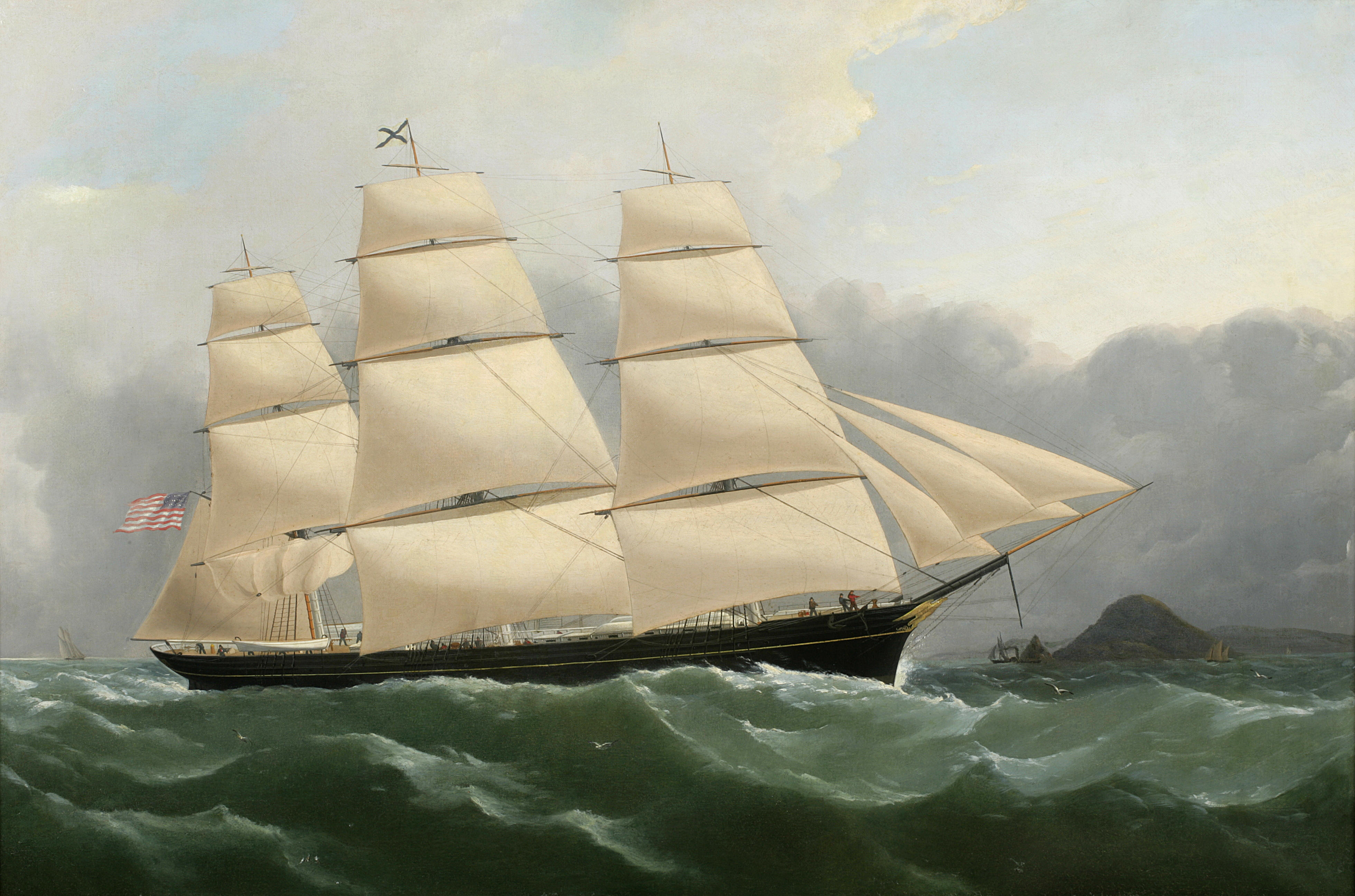
The clipper ship "Challenge" of the N.L. & G. Griswold fleet

House flag of the N.L & G. Griswold

House flag of the Black X Line

Members of the Connecticut branch of the family moved to New York City in 1796 and engaged in trade. Brothers Nathaniel Lynde Griswold and George Griswold founded the N.L & G. Griswold Company to import sugar and rum from the Caribbean on clipper ships. They expanded to the China Trade, capturing a large share of the 19th century tea market. It was noted that "I do not suppose that there is a country store, however insignificant, in the entire United States that has not seen a large or small package of tea marked 'N.L & G.G.' George Griswold Jr operated clipper ships to China and amassed a great fortune; setting up residence on Fifth Avenue. John Griswold, brother of George Jr., was responsible for building the John N. A. Griswold House in Newport, Rhode Island.

Another member of the family, John Griswold, founded the Black X Line of packet clippers that shipped supplies between the United States and Great Britain. Robert Harper Griswold, a man whom Herman Melville called "a man of much reading .. elegant manner and great personal beauty," greatly expanded the line and amassed his own wealth. His wealth enabled him to buy the home that now houses the Florence Griswold Museum, named after his daughter.

== Notable family members ==
=== Noted as business-people ===
- Samuel Griswold (1790–1867): American industrialist.
- John Augustus Griswold (1818–1873): U.S. Representative from New York, Industrialist, and builder of the ironclad USS Monitor.
- John N. A. Griswold (1822–1909): China trade merchant and industrialist. Commissioned the John N. A. Griswold House in Newport, Rhode Island.
- William E. S. Griswold (1877–1964): CEO of W. & J. Sloane
- John Sloane Griswold Sr. (1914–2005): Noted industrial design executive
- Anita Griswold (1903–1976); real estate broker, wife of John C. Griswold

=== Noted as politicians and activists ===
Many Griswold family members were influential in politics in the states of Connecticut and New York.

- Edward Griswold: (1607–1690): Founding father of Connecticut, early colonial politician.
- Matthew Griswold (1714–1799): 17th Governor of Connecticut.
- Roger Griswold (1762–1812): 22nd Governor of Connecticut, 6th Lieutenant Governor of Connecticut, and U.S. Representative.
- Gaylord Griswold (1767–1809): U.S. Representative from New York and drafter of the 12th Amendment of the U.S. Constitution.
- John Augustus Griswold (1818–1873): U.S. Representative from New York, Industrialist, and builder of the ironclad USS Monitor.
- John Ashley Griswold (1822–1902): U.S. Representative from New York.
- George Griswold (1794–1857): Lieutenant Governor of Michigan.
- Simeon Griswold (1752–1843): Five time member of the Massachusetts State Legislature.
- Chester Griswold: Member of the New York State Assembly, Supervisor of Nassau, New York.
- William M. Griswold (1823–1889): Member of the Wisconsin State Assembly and Wisconsin State Senate.
- William A. Griswold (1775–1846): Speaker of the Vermont House of Representatives.
- William N. Griswold (1834–1921): Supervisor of Welfare for New York.
- Matthew Griswold (1833–1919): U.S. Congressman from Pennsylvania.

=== Art and culture ===
- Florence Griswold (1850–1937): American artist and founder of the Old Lyme art colony.
- Frank Gray Griswold (1854–1937): American sportsman and society leader of the Gilded Age.
- Mariana Griswold Van Rensselaer (1851–1934): American author and leader in the aesthetic movement.
- Frank Tracy Griswold Jr. (1914-1969): American automobile racer, won the Grand Prix road race closing the New York World's Fair in 1940 and the first American Grand Prix at Watkins Glen in 1948.
- Frank Tracy Griswold III (1937–2023): American clergyman, 25th Presiding Bishop of the Episcopal Church.
- William M. Griswold (1960-): American art historian and noted director of the Cleveland Museum of Art.

=== Science and academia ===
- John Augustus Griswold, Jr. (1912–1991): American ornithologist, Curator of Birds, Philadelphia Zoological Gardens.
- Alfred Whitney Griswold (1906–1963): American historian and President of Yale University
- Erwin Griswold (1904–1994): Solicitor General of the United States and Dean of Harvard Law School

== Griswold family tree ==
Griswold family members
- Daniel Griswold (1656–1728) m. Mindwell Bissell (1663–1728)
  - Daniel Griswold (1684–1772) m. Sarah White (1694–1738)
    - Seth Griswold (1723–1810) m. Susanna Shurtleff (1732–1757)
      - Simeon Griswold (1752–1843) m. Ann Hutchinson (1755–1836)
        - Justin Griswold (1779–1841)
        - Chester Griswold (1781–1860) m. Abby Moulton
          - John Augustus Griswold (1818–1872) m. Elizabeth Hart
- Matthew Griswold (1652–c. 1716) m. (1) 1683: Phebe Hyde (1663–1704); m. (2) 1705: Mary DeWolf (c. 1656–1724)
  - John Griswold (1690–1764) m. 1713: Hannah Lee (1694–1773)
    - Matthew Griswold (1714–1799) m. 1743: Ursula Wolcott (1724–1788)
      - Marian Griswold (1750–1829) m. (1) 1769: Charles Church Chandler (1747–1787); m. (2) 1793: Ebenezer Lane (1747–1808); m. (3) 1809: Justin Ely (1739–1817)
        - Dorothy Church Chandler (1770–1847) m. James Backus (1764–1816)
          - William Wolcott Backus (1803–1892)
          - Henry Titus Backus (1809–1877) m. Juliana Trumball Woodbridge
        - Marian Griswold Chandler (1774–1817) m. James Lanman (1769–1841)
          - Charles James Lanman (1819–1895) m. Adeline Dodge
            - Charles Lanman (1819–1895) m. Adeline Dodge
        - Ebenezer Lane (1793–1866)
      - Roger Griswold (1762–1812) m. 1798: Fanny Rogers
        - Frances Ann Griswold m. 1818: Ebenezer Lane (1793–1866)
    - Phebe Griswold (1716–1770) m. 1731: Jonathan Parsons (1705–1776)
      - Samuel Holden Parsons (1737–1789) m. 1761: Mehitabel Mather (1743–1802)
    - Thomas Griswold (1718–1770) m. 1741: Susannah Lynde (1721–1768)
    - Hannah Griswold (1723–1772) m. Benajah Bushnell
    - Lucy Griswold (1726–1795) m. 1753: Elijah Backus (1726–1798)
    - Sarah Griswold (1729–1777) m. William Hillhouse (1728–1816)
      - John Griswold Hillhouse (1751–1806) m. Elizabeth Mason
        - Harriet Hillhouse (1792–1866) m. David Buel (1784–1860)
          - Samuel Buel (1815–1892) m. Jane Eliza Wilmer (1820–1908)
            - David Hillhouse Buel (1839–1870) m. Josephine Maria McDougall
              - David Hillhouse Buel (1862–1923) m. 1912: Katherine Frances Powers
          - Oliver Prince Buel (1838–1899) m. Josephine Maria (née McDougall) Buel
      - James Hillhouse (1754–1832)
      - Thomas Griswold Hillhouse (1766–1835)
        - Thomas Hillhouse (1817–1897) m. Harriet Prouty (1823–1903)
          - Thomas Griswold Hillhouse (1848–1910)
    - Clarissa Griswold (1735–1811) m. Nathan Elliott (1725–1798)
    - Deborah Griswold (1735–1811) m. 1756 Nathan Jewett Jr. (1734–1802)
  - George Griswold (1692–1761) m. Hannah Lynde (1698–1734)
    - George Griswold (1726–1816) m. Elizabeth Lee (1735–1797)
      - George Griswold (1777–1859) m. (1) Eliza Woodhull (1784–1810); m. (2) Maria Matilda Cumming (1792–1880)
        - Maria Griswold (1804–1866) m. George Winthrop Gray (1799–1863)
          - George Griswold Gray (1830–1875) m. Susan Irvin (1842–1924)
          - Henry Winthrop Gray (1839–1906) m. Mary Mackall Travers (1847–1900) (daughter of William R. Travers)
            - Maria Griswold Gray (1868–1947) m. William Bay Coster (1868–1918)
        - Cornelia Woodhull Griswold (1807–1888) m. Joseph Woodward Haven (1803–1872)
          - George Griswold Haven Sr. (1837–1908) m. Emma Walton Martin (1840–1873)
            - George Griswold Haven Jr. (1866–1925) m. (1) Elizabeth Shaw Ingersoll (1860–1923); m. (2) Dorothy James
              - Leila Ingersoll Haven (1890–1974) m. Gilbert Edward Jones Jr. (1888–1925)
              - George Griswold Haven III (1892–1944) m. Elizabeth George (1896–1990)
              - Alice Haven (1895–1946) m. (1) George Schieffelin Trevor (1892–1951); (2) William Otis Waters (1889–1940)
            - Cornelia Haven (1860–1926) m. Stephen Peabody
            - Alice Griswold Haven (1863–1959) m. John Nelson Borland (1859–1929)
              - Alice "Ella" Borland (1887–1987) m. Orme Wilson Jr. (1885–1966)
                - Orme Wilson III (1920–1991) m. Julie Brown Colt
            - Joseph Woodward Haven (1864–1945) m. Henrietta Katherine Cram (1863–1934)
              - Katherine Sergeant Haven (1898–1974) m. (1) Johnston Livingston Redmond (1888–1933) (brother of Roland L. Redmond); m. (2) William Henry Osborn II (1895–1971) (grandson of William H. Osborn)
        - Sarah Helen Griswold (1815–1893) m. John Cleve Green (1800–1875)
        - Matilda Elizabeth Griswold (1817–1889) m. Frederick Theodore Frelinghuysen (1817–1885)
          - Matilda Griswold Frelinghuysen (1846–1926) m. Henry Winthrop Gray (1839–1906)
          - Charlotte Louisa "Lucy" Frelinghuysen (1847–1930)
          - Frederick Frelinghuysen (1848–1924), m. Estelle Burnet Kinney (1868–1931)
            - Frederick Frelinghuysen (1903–1966)
            - Thomas Frelinghuysen (b. 1905) m. Roselyne de Viry (1920–2014) (daughter of Baron Humbert and Baroness Delphine Marie de Viry)
            - Theodore Frelinghuysen (b. 1907)
            - George Griswold Frelinghuysen II (1908–2002) m. Anne de Smolianinof
            - Estelle Condit Frelinghuysen (1911–1988) m. George Lovett Kingsland Morris (1905–1975)
          - George Griswold Frelinghuysen (1851–1936), m. Sara Linen Ballantine (granddaughter of Peter Ballantine)
          - Sarah Helen Frelinghuysen (1856–1939) m. (1) John J. Davis (1851–1902); m. (2) Charles Laurie McCawley (1865–1935)
            - Mathilda Elizabeth Frelinghuysen Davis (1876–1960), m. George Cabot Lodge (1873–1909)
              - Henry Cabot Lodge Jr. (1902–1985) m. Emily Esther Sears
                - George Cabot Lodge II (b. 1927) m. (1) Nancy Kunhardt (daughter of Dorothy Kunhardt); m. (2) Susan Alexander Powers
                - Henry Sears Lodge (1930–2017)
              - John Davis Lodge (1903–1985) m. Francesca Braggiotti (1902–1998)
                - Lily Lodge (b. 1930)
                - Beatrice Anna Cabot Lodge m. Antonio de Oyarzabal (b. 1935)
            - Helena Constance Lodge (1905–1998) m. Baron Edouard de Streel (1896–1981)
          - Theodore Frelinghuysen (1860–1928) m. Alice Dudley Coats (1861–1889) (daughter of Sir James Coats, 1st Baronet)
        - George Griswold Jr. (1820–1884) m. Lydia Alley (1826–1908)
          - Mariana Griswold (1851–1934) m. Schuyler Van Rensselaer (1845–1884)
            - George Griswold Van Rensselaer (1875–1894)
          - Frank Gray Griswold (1854–1937) m. Josephine Houghteling Canfield (1864–1937) (mother of Cass Canfield)
          - George Griswold III (1857–1917) m. Emily Oliver Post (1860–1905)
            - George Griswold IV (1896–1964) m. Isabelle Batelle Bridgman (1896–1977)
        - John Noble Alsop Griswold (1822–1909) m. Jane Louisa Emmet (1832–1909)
          - Minnie Griswold (1861–1954) m. John Murray Forbes Jr. (1844–1921)
          - Richard Alsop Griswold (1863–1864)
          - John Noble "Jack" Griswold (1865–1895)
          - Florence Temple Griswold (1867–1937) m. Horatio Robert Odo Cross (1846–1915)
            - Graham Griswold Odo Cross (1898–1963)
          - George Griswold II (1870–1902)

== Places ==
- Griswold, Connecticut: named for Governor Roger Griswold.
- Fort Griswold, Groton, Connecticut: Named for Governor Matthew Griswold.
- Griswoldville, Georgia
- The Griswold Inn, one of the oldest continuously run taverns in the United States.
- The Griswold House, one of the Houses at The Lawrenceville School in Lawrenceville, New Jersey
- Griswold Point, a historic Griswold estate, deeded to Matthew Griswold by Lord Keswick and established in 1639
