= International Residential College =

Residential college at the University of Virginia

Coordinates: 38.039112°N 78.507585°W

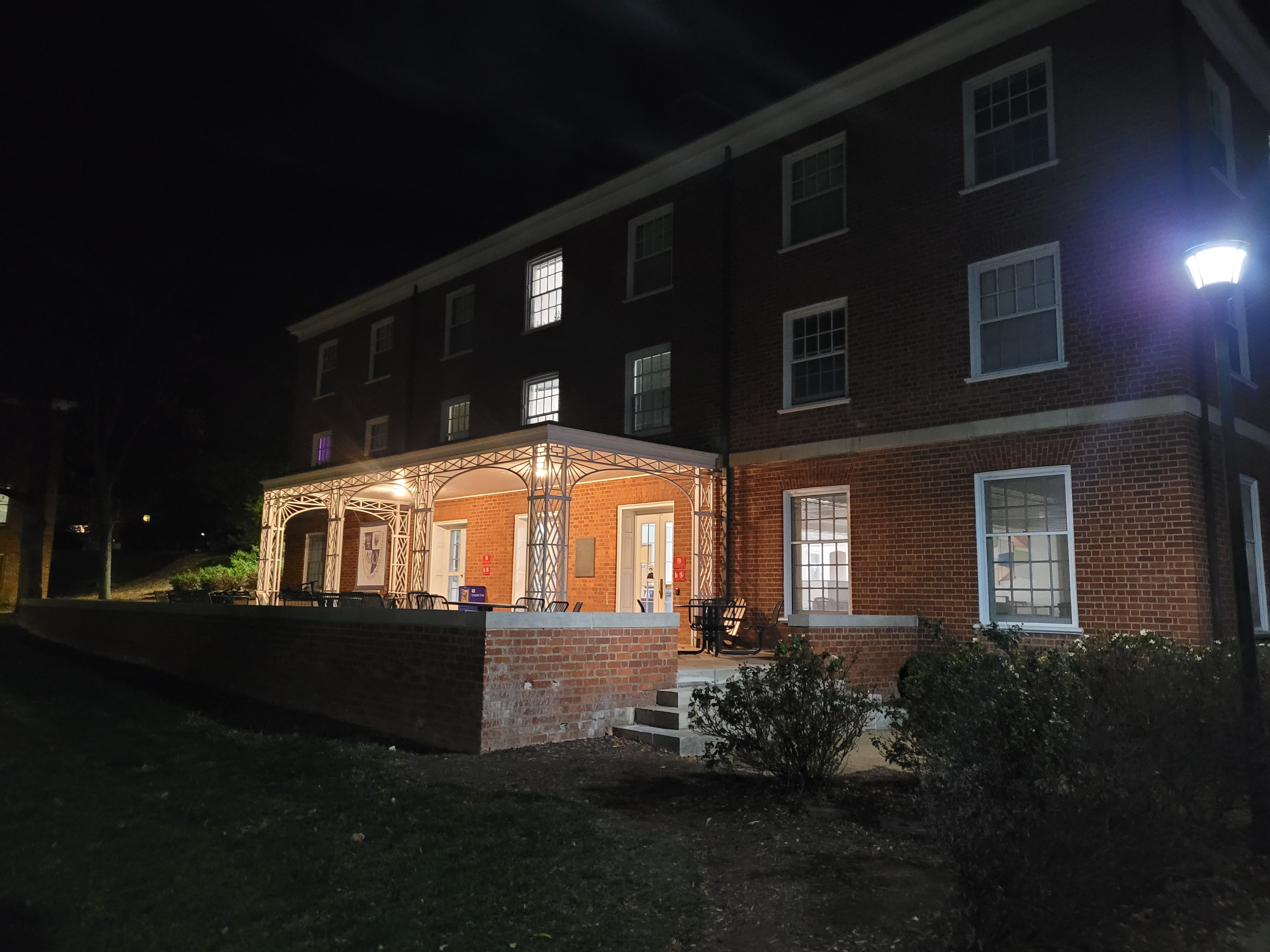
- Motto: Live the Difference
- Type: Residential college
- Established: 2001
- Affiliations: University of Virginia
- Principal: Abbey Stockstill
- Undergraduates: 317
- Location: Charlottesville, Virginia, U.S.
- Campus: Four student residential buildings, plus one faculty residential building.
- Nickname: The Bears
- Website: https://irc.virginia.edu/

The International Residential College (also known as the IRC) was established in 2001, and is the newest residential college at the University of Virginia. It comprises Mary Munford, Roberta Gwathmey, Yen (formerly Lewis), and Hoxton dorms (also sometimes referred to as 'houses'), all of which existed before the IRC was established. The IRC houses 317 students of all years at UVA, with international students making up 30% of the students living at the IRC, representing 29 countries.

== History ==
Morea House, which currently houses both the International Residential College's Principal and the Director of Studies, was constructed in 1835 by the University of Virginia's first professor of natural history John Patten Emmet, it was later sold to the institution in 1960 after having been privately owned for a long duration. In 1951, during a period of rapid growth for the University of Virginia, Munford Hall was constructed on grounds of the original Morea tract to accommodate for the growing student body. Later in 1970 when the institution began allowing female enrollment, Gwathmey Hall was built adjacent to Munford Hall. In the early 1980s, the Morea property was the site of a dispute between the university and the Albemarle Garden Club over the planned construction of two new additional residential halls on the eastern end of the property, however after much controversy the university was able to finish construction of the Hoxton House and Lewis House.

After the university chartered the Virginia 2020 plan to improve its cultural horizons, it opened up applications to the IRC for the first time in January 2001. The IRC opened its doors in the Fall of 2001 to 323 American and international students at the four dorm residences located along Sprigg Lane. The founder and first principal of the IRC was Professor Brad Brown. The crest was created to represent the four houses and their corresponding words of the Latin motto, the Wheat for food, the Bear for friendship, the Owl for wisdom, and the Laurels for peace.

In 2013, the first principal of the IRC Brad Brown stepped down and was succeeded by Professor Eric Loth.

In 2017, Pulitzer Prize winner Junot Díaz visited the residential college as a result of its residential students having chosen his novel The Brief Wondrous Life of Oscar Wao as their summer read. Later on in the year, the IRC renamed Lewis House (which had its name derived from American eugenics advocate Ivey Foreman Lewis) to Yen House in honor of the Chinese Premier Yan Huiqing who was the first Chinese student to graduate from UVA.

In 2018, the second principal of the IRC, Professor Eric Loth was succeeded by Professor Reid Bailey.

In 2020, as a result of the COVID-19 pandemic, the IRC was temporarily converted into quarantine housing alongside the Johnson, Malone and Weedon dorms and Shea House, which left many students having to find alternative solutions to their housing issue with only 24 hours.

In spring 2021, the IRC re-opened up applications for residential housing and accepted applicants were able to move-in in fall 2021.

== Membership ==
International Residential College residents can be of any year at the university (as opposed to many other residence halls, where restrictions are placed based on the year of the student). All students, whether they are returning upperclassmen, incoming First Years, transfer students, or exchange students, must apply to be able to live in the IRC.

== Architecture ==
The different houses within the International Residential College feature different styles due to wide timespans in-between the construction of each residence. Morea House, influenced highly by Jeffersonian architecture, features a recessed second-story veranda with Tuscan columns and an exposed structural arcade in the front room. The former Sprigg Lane residence halls which include the Munford, Gwathmey, Yen, and Hoxton house, were built in a Neo-Georgian style with a light application of Jeffersonian detail.

== Dorms/Houses ==
=== Munford and Gwathmey Houses ===
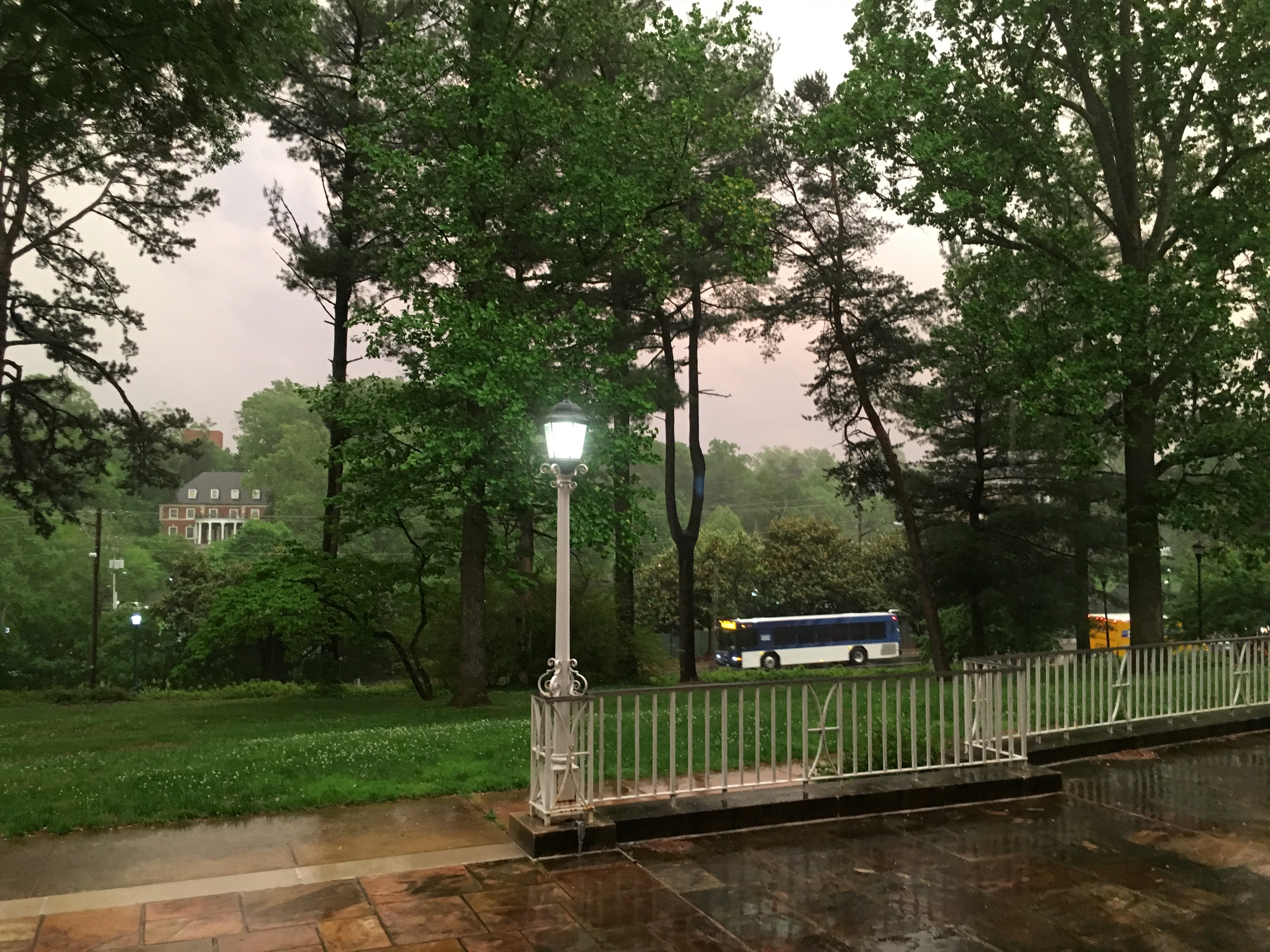
View from the first floor of Mary Munford, 2017.

Mary Munford and Roberta Gwathmey are two interconnected buildings located on Emmet Street, near the Memorial Gym.

- Munford House – Except for six men who live in a small corridor on the first floor, all the residents of Munford House are women, including all of the first-year women. About 100 people live in Munford. Each floor is equipped with study rooms, a large kitchen (with an oven, microwave, refrigerator and sink), and two bathrooms (one for each half of the hall). There are three floors and no elevators. The first floor is a communal space for all students of the IRC, and the location of many events the IRC sponsors.
- Gwathmey House – Gwathmey is the largest residence (due to the first floor of Munford primarily serving as a communal space), holding about 120 students. Men, including the first-years, live on the first and third floors, and the second floor is for women. Each floor is equipped with a large kitchen and a large bathroom. The first floor also houses a lounge for the residents.

=== Yen and Hoxton Houses ===
Yen and Hoxton are located next to Alumni Hall on Sprigg Lane. Both houses are designed in the suite style, where most suites are inhabited by like-gendered students in single and double rooms. Hoxton has one co-ed suite. Both houses also have several single and double (Hoxton only) rooms available in the hallways between the suites. Shared and private bathrooms, as well as full kitchens on each floor, are also available in both houses.

- Yen House – Yen holds about 60 upper-class students. Yen House was formerly named Lewis House; in 2017 the name was changed to Yen House to honor the first Chinese student to earn a degree from UVA.
- Hoxton House – Hoxton holds approximately 40 upper-class students and is air conditioned.

=== Morea House ===
Morea House is located behind Hoxton house. It includes Morea Arboretum at the west end of its grounds. The house is divided into two sections, Big Morea and Little Morea, and is on the National Register of Historic Places.

- Big Morea is where the principal of the IRC and their family resides.
- Little Morea is where the director of studies and their family resides.
