= Henry Tunis Smith Farm =

Historic house in New York, United States

- U.S. National Register of Historic Places
- Location within New York Location within the United States
- Nearest city: Nassau, New York
- Coordinates: 42°29′37″N 73°37′10″W
- Area: 162.5 acres (65.8 ha)
- Built: 1800
- Architectural style: Federal, Adamesque
- NRHP reference No.: 75001222
- Added to NRHP: September 18, 1975

Henry Tunis Smith Farm, also known as the Middlebrook Farm, is a historic farmhouse located at Nassau in Rensselaer County, New York. The house was built in 1789 in the Federal style. It consists of a 1 1/2-story main block, five bays wide, with a 1-story, three-bay wing. The front facade features a finely detailed frieze.

It was listed on the National Register of Historic Places in 1975.

The house sits on a historic property that traces back to the 17th century Dutch Manor of Rensselaerswyck

Rensselaerswyck was a Dutch estate of approximately 1,200 sq. miles comprising the present Albany, Columbia and Rensselaer counties. The Dutch Patroon Stephen Van Rensselaer devised a solution to sustain the financial viability of the land without selling it. He divided the estate into parcels and granted tenants perpetual leases at moderate rates of about one percent of the land's output. Eventually, about 900 farms of 150 acres were established. The solution greatly increased the productivity for the land and generated large economic benefit for the entire Albany area.

The current farm property includes the original parcel leased from Van Rensselaer.
