= Simeon Griswold =

American politician

Member of the Massachusetts House of Representatives
- In office 1805–1807, 1809, 1814
- Preceded by: Caleb Wadhams
- Succeeded by: John Dickinson
- Preceded by: Timothy Childs
- Succeeded by: Joshua Danforth

Personal details
- Born: May 16, 1752 Bolton, Connecticut
- Died: December 7, 1843 Nassau, New York
- Spouse: Ann Hutchinson (after 1778)
- Relations: John Augustus Griswold (grandson)
- Parent(s): Seth Griswold; Susanna Shurtleff
- Occupation: Politician, Merchant

Simeon Griswold (May 16, 1752 – December 7, 1843) was a Massachusetts Representative from Pittsfield, Massachusetts, and a member of the political Griswold Family.

== Early life ==
Griswold was born in Bolton, Connecticut, on May 16, 1752. He was one of three children born to Seth Griswold (1723–1810) and Susanna (née Shurtleff) Griswold (1732–1757), who married in 1751 in Bolton.

His paternal grandparents were Daniel Griswold and Sarah (née White) Griswold. His maternal grandparents were John Shurtleff and Sarah Carver Lucas (herself the daughter of Benoni Lucas and Repentance Harlow).

== Career ==
At the age of 22, he volunteered to serve in the Connecticut Line during the American Revolution, after which he moved to Pittsfield and opened the Pittsfield Hotel as a meeting and lodging place for members of opposing political parties.

=== Public office ===
Griswold was elected to the Massachusetts State Legislature from the town of Pittsfield five times, serving from 1805 to 1807, 1809, 1814. Griswold died in Nassau, New York.

== Personal life ==
On May 7, 1778, Griswold was married to Ann Hutchinson (1755–1836). Together, they were the parents of:

- Justin Griswold (1779–1841)
- Chester Griswold (1781–1860), a New York representative who married Abby Moulton, daughter of Howard and Mary (née White) Moulton of Troy, on June 23, 1813.

He died on December 7, 1843, in Nassau, New York.

=== Descendants ===
Through his son Chester, he was the grandfather of U.S. Congressman John Augustus Griswold (1818–1872).
