= Nassau, New York =

Town in Rensselaer County, New York, US

- Town
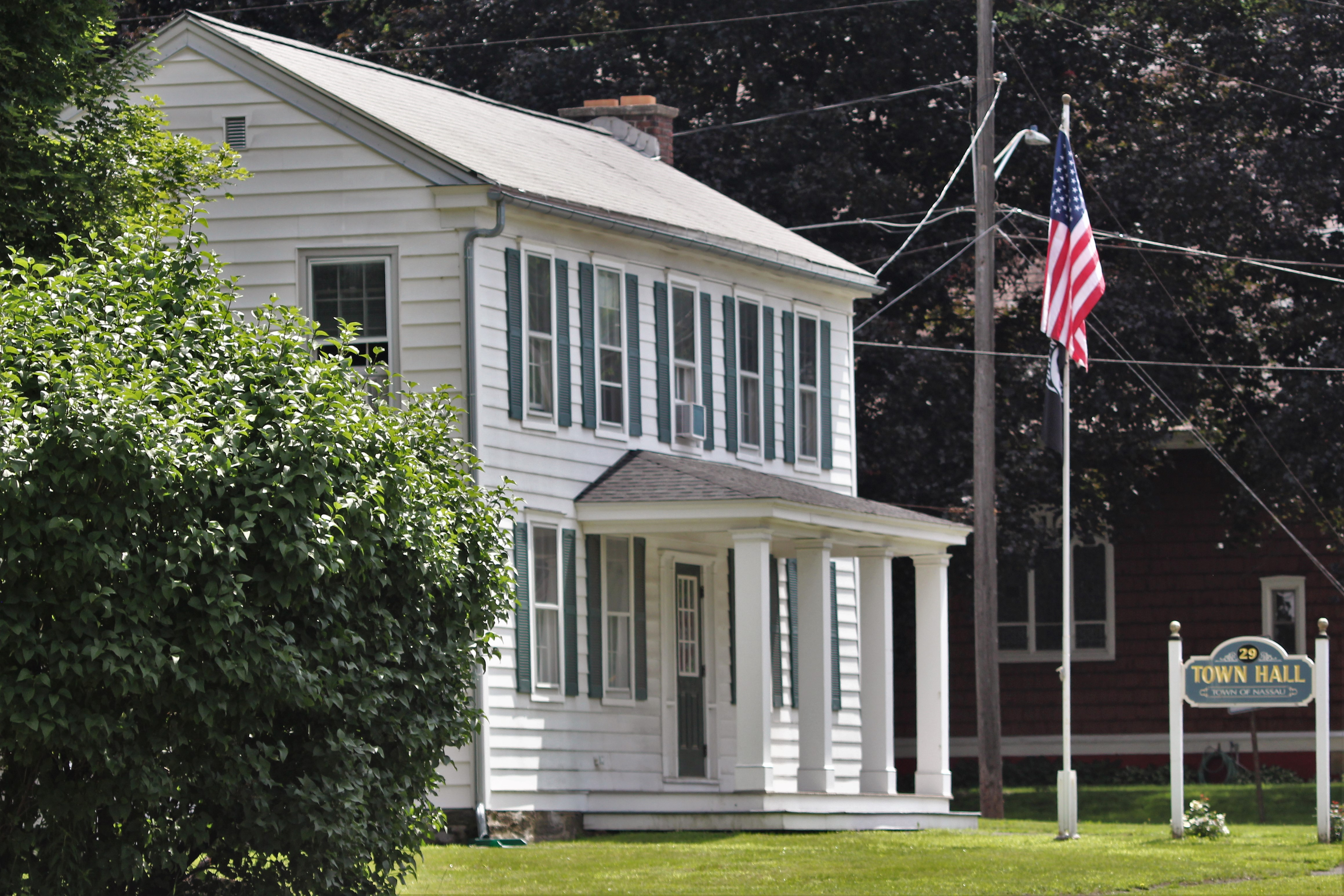
- Town hall

- Location in Rensselaer County and the state of New York.
- Coordinates: 42°33′N 73°33′W
- Country: United States
- State: New York
- County: Rensselaer
- Incorporated: 1806 (as Town of Philipstown)

Government
  - Supervisor: David Fleming

Area
  - Total: 45.24 sq mi (117.16 km^{2})
  - Land: 44.44 sq mi (115.11 km^{2})
  - Water: 0.79 sq mi (2.05 km^{2})
- Elevation: 920 ft (280 m)

Population (2020)
  - Total: 4,545
  - Density: 102.3/sq mi (39.48/km^{2})
- Time zone: UTC-5 (Eastern (EST))
  - Summer (DST): UTC-4 (EDT)
- ZIP code: 12123
- Area code: 518
- FIPS code: 36-49517
- GNIS feature ID: 0979250
- Website: townofnassau.org

Nassau is a town in Rensselaer County, New York, United States. The population was 4,545 in 2020, down from 4,789 at the 2010 census.

The Town of Nassau is at the southern border of the county.

== History ==
The region was first settled around 1760. The town was originally formed as the "Town of Philipstown" in 1806 from parts of the Towns of Petersburgh, Schodack, and Stephentown. The town changed its name to "Nassau" in 1808, in honor of Fort Nassau, the first settlement by the Dutch in what is now New York.

The Henry Tunis Smith Farm was listed on the National Register of Historic Places in 1975.

== Geography ==
According to the United States Census Bureau, the town has a total area of 45.2 square miles (117.1 km^{2}), of which 44.5 square miles (115.4 km^{2}) is land and 0.7 square mile (1.7 km^{2}) (1.46%) is water.

The southern town line is the border of Columbia County, New York.

== Demographics ==
Historical population
Census	Pop.	Note	%±
1820	2,873		—
1830	3,254		13.3%
1840	3,236		−0.6%
1850	3,261		0.8%
1860	3,039		−6.8%
1870	2,705		−11.0%
1880	2,629		−2.8%
1890	2,273		−13.5%
1900	2,073		−8.8%
1910	2,115		2.0%
1920	2,015		−4.7%
1930	2,020		0.2%
1940	2,405		19.1%
1950	3,122		29.8%
1960	3,721		19.2%
1970	4,043		8.7%
1980	4,479		10.8%
1990	4,989		11.4%
2000	4,818		−3.4%
2010	4,789		−0.6%
2020	4,545		−5.1%
U.S. Decennial Census

As of the census of 2000, there were 4,818 people, 1,851 households, and 1,330 families residing in the town. The population density was 108.2 inhabitants per square mile (41.8/km^{2}). There were 2,058 housing units at an average density of 46.2 per square mile (17.8/km^{2}). The racial makeup of the town was 96.66% White, 1.08% Black or African American, 0.25% Native American, 0.54% Asian, 0.10% from other races, and 1.37% from two or more races. Hispanic or Latino of any race were 0.98% of the population.

There were 1,851 households, out of which 34.0% had children under the age of 18 living with them, 56.3% were married couples living together, 10.3% had a female householder with no husband present, and 28.1% were non-families. 21.4% of all households were made up of individuals, and 8.1% had someone living alone who was 65 years of age or older. The average household size was 2.60 and the average family size was 3.04.

In the town, the population was spread out, with 26.0% under the age of 18, 6.7% from 18 to 24, 30.9% from 25 to 44, 25.5% from 45 to 64, and 10.8% who were 65 years of age or older. The median age was 38 years. For every 100 females, there were 100.9 males. For every 100 females age 18 and over, there were 98.3 males.

The median income for a household in the town was $46,526, and the median income for a family was $53,313. Males had a median income of $38,981 versus $26,804 for females. The per capita income for the town was $21,785. About 5.9% of families and 7.7% of the population were below the poverty line, including 12.0% of those under age 18 and 7.0% of those age 65 or over.

== Communities and locations in Nassau ==
- Alps – A hamlet on NY 43, east of Denault Corners. The name stems from the mountainous terrain.
- Brainard – A hamlet at the southern end of East Nassau at the junction of US 20 and NY 66.
- Denault Corners – A hamlet on the northern town line at the junction of NY 43 and NY 66.
- Dunham Hollow- A hamlet in the extreme northeastern part of the town at the junction of NY 43 and Dunham Hollow Road. The community was named after Isaac Dunham, a pioneer citizen.
- East Nassau – The Village of East Nassau is located along the corridor of NY 66, on the eastern town line.
- Hoags Corners – A hamlet at the northern end of East Nassau at the junction of NY 66 and Central Nassau Road. The community was named after W. B. Hoag, a pioneer citizen.
- Jack's Corners – A hamlet on US 20, three miles east of the Village of Nassau.
- Millers Corners – A hamlet in the northwestern part of the town at the southwestern corner of Burden Lake.
- Nassau – The Village of Nassau is at the western town line, centered around the junction of US 20 and NY 203.
- Nassau Lake – A census-designated place on the western town line surrounding the lake of the same name.
- North Nassau – A hamlet in the northern part of the town, at the junction of Hoags Corners and North Nassau roads.

== Notable people ==
- Smith A. Boughton, leader of the Anti-Rent War, lived in Alps
- Fenner Ferguson, Delegate to the United States House of Representatives from Nebraska Territory, born in Nassau
- Lydia Davis, writer, translator, and essayist. Lives in East Nassau.
- Chester Griswold, member of the New York State Assembly, town supervisor of Nassau, postmaster of Nassau
- John Augustus Griswold, U.S. Congressman
- Simeon Griswold, member of the Massachusetts House of Representatives
- Samuel Ludlow, Nassau town clerk, later served as a state court judge in Oswego, New York
- Charles Ezra Sprague, Union Army officer and accountant
