= Chester Griswold =

American politician

Member of the New York State Legislature
- In office 1823, 1831, 1835

Personal details
- Born: January 14, 1781 Bolton, Connecticut
- Died: September 7, 1860 Nassau, New York
- Children: John Augustus Griswold
- Parent(s): Simeon Griswold; Ann Hutchinson
- Occupation: Politician, postmaster

Chester Griswold (January 14, 1781 – September 7, 1860) was a New York Assemblyman from Nassau, New York, and a member of the political Griswold Family.

== Biography ==
Griswold was born in Bolton, Connecticut, to Simeon Griswold and Ann Hutchinson. Chester was elected to the New York State Legislature in 1823, 1831, and 1835. He was a long-time Postmaster of Nassau.

Chester's son, John Augustus Griswold, served as a member of the U.S. House of Representatives from New York's 15th district.
