= 1820 United States census =

Fourth US census

- August 7, 1820
- Seal of the United States Marshals Service, which administered the census

General information
- Country: United States
- Authority: Office of the United States Marshal

Results
- Total population: 9,638,454 (▲33.1%)
- Most populous state: New York; 1,532,881
- Least populous state: Illinois; 55,211

The 1820 United States census was the fourth census conducted in the United States. It was conducted on August 7, 1820. The 1820 census included six new states: Louisiana, Indiana, Mississippi, Illinois, Alabama and Maine. There has been a district wide loss of 1820 census records for Arkansas Territory, Missouri Territory, and New Jersey.

The total population was determined to be 9,638,453, of which 1,538,022 were slaves. The center of population was about 120 miles (193 km) west-northwest of Washington in Hardy County, Virginia (now in West Virginia).

This was the first census in which any states recorded a population of over one million—New York, Virginia, and Pennsylvania—as well as the first in which a city recorded a population of over 100,000—New York. Also, in this census and the 14 subsequent ones, New York was the most populous state until being superseded by California in the 1970 census.

== Census questions ==
The 1820 census contains a great deal more information than previous censuses. Enumerators listed the following data in columns, left to right:

1. Name of the head of family
  1. of free white males under age 10
  2. of free white males age 10 to under 16
  3. of free white males age 16 to 18
  4. of free white males age 16 to under 26
  5. of free white males age 26 to under 45
  6. of free white males age 45 and up
  7. of free white females under age 10
  8. of free white females age 10 to under 16
  9. of free white females age 16 to under 26
  10. of free white females age 26 to under 45
  11. of free white females age 45 and up
  12. of foreigners not naturalized
  13. of persons engaged in agriculture
  14. of persons engaged in commerce
  15. of persons engaged in manufacture
  16. of male slaves under 14
  17. of male slaves age 14 to under 26
  18. of male slaves age 26 to under 45
  19. of male slaves age 45 and up
  20. of female slaves under 14
  21. of female slaves age 14 to under 26
  22. of female slaves age 26 to under 45
  23. of female slaves age 45 and up
  24. of free male colored persons under 14
  25. of free male colored persons age 14 to under 26
  26. of free male colored persons age 26 to under 45
  27. of free male colored persons age 45 and up
  28. of free female colored persons under 14
  29. of free female colored persons age 14 to under 26
  30. of free female colored persons age 26 to under 45
  31. of free female colored persons age 45 and up
  32. of all other persons except Indians not taxed

Several of these columns were for special counts, and not to be included in the aggregate total. Doing so would have resulted in counting some individuals twice. Census takers were asked to use double lines, red ink or some other method of distinguishing these columns so that double counting would not occur. For example, the count of free white males between 16 and 18 was a special count, because these individuals were also supposed to be tabulated in the column for free white males of age 16 and under 26.

The other special counts were foreigners not naturalized, persons engaged in agriculture, persons engaged in commerce, and persons engaged in manufacture.

Census takers were also instructed to count each individual in only one of the occupational columns. For example, if an individual was engaged in agriculture, commerce, and manufacture, the census taker had to judge which one the individual was primarily engaged in.

== Note to researchers ==
Census taking was not yet an exact science. Before 1830, enumerators lacked pre-printed forms, and drew up their own, sometimes resulting in pages without headings, line tallies, or column totals. As a result, census records for many towns before 1830 are idiosyncratic. This is not to suggest that they are less reliable than subsequent censuses, but that they may require more work on the part of the researcher.

== State rankings ==
Rank	State	Population
01	New York	1,532,981
02	Virginia	1,075,069
03	Pennsylvania	1,049,458
04	North Carolina	638,829
05	Ohio	581,434
06	Kentucky	564,317
07	Massachusetts	523,287
08	South Carolina	502,741
09	Tennessee	422,823 (Note: Printed as 422,813 in the 1820 report, but later corrected.)
10	Maryland	407,350
11	Georgia	340,989
12	Maine	298,335
13	New Jersey	277,575
14	Connecticut	275,202
15	New Hampshire	244,161
16	Vermont	235,981 (Note: Printed as 235,764 in the 1820 report, but later corrected.)
17	Louisiana	153,407
18	Indiana	147,178
19	Alabama	144,317 (Note: Forstall, Richard L. (1996). Population of States and Counties of the United States: 1790 to 1990. Washington: U.S. Bureau of the Census, pp. 8–11. ISBN 0-934213-48-8. Retrieved May 19, 2021. Due to the late arrival of returns from the counties of Lawrence, Perry, and Washington, the population of the state was incorrectly listed as 127,901 in the official state total. (Note: The relevant note on p. 10 erroneously switches the population values for Perry and Washington counties. The correct values can be found on page 121 of the final census report for 1820.))
X	West Virginia	136,808
20	Rhode Island	83,059
21	Mississippi	75,448
22	Delaware	72,749
X	Missouri	66,586
23	Illinois	55,211
X	District of Columbia	23,336
X	Arkansas	14,273
X	Michigan	7,452
X	Wisconsin	1,444

== City rankings ==
Rank	City	State	Population	Region (2016)
01	New York	New York	123,706	Northeast
02	Philadelphia	Pennsylvania	63,802	Northeast
03	Baltimore	Maryland	62,738	South
04	Boston	Massachusetts	43,298	Northeast
05	New Orleans	Louisiana	27,176	South
06	Charleston	South Carolina	24,780	South
07	Northern Liberties	Pennsylvania	19,678	Northeast
08	Southwark	Pennsylvania	14,713	Northeast
09	Washington	District of Columbia	13,247	South
10	Salem	Massachusetts	12,731	Northeast
11	Albany	New York	12,630	Northeast
12	Richmond	Virginia	12,067	South
13	Providence	Rhode Island	11,767	Northeast
14	Cincinnati	Ohio	9,642	Midwest
15	Portland	Maine	8,581	Northeast
16	Norfolk	Virginia	8,478	South
17	Alexandria	District of Columbia	8,218	South
18	Savannah	Georgia	7,523	South
19	Georgetown	District of Columbia	7,360	South
20	Portsmouth	New Hampshire	7,327	Northeast
21	Newport	Rhode Island	7,319	Northeast
22	Nantucket	Massachusetts	7,266	Northeast
23	Pittsburgh	Pennsylvania	7,248	Northeast
24	Brooklyn	New York	7,175	Northeast
25	New Haven	Connecticut	7,147	Northeast
26	Kensington	Pennsylvania	7,118	Northeast
27	Newburyport	Massachusetts	6,852	Northeast
28	Petersburg	Virginia	6,690	South
29	Lancaster	Pennsylvania	6,633	Northeast
30	Charlestown	Massachusetts	6,591	Northeast
31	Newark	New Jersey	6,507	Northeast
32	Gloucester	Massachusetts	6,384	Northeast
33	Marblehead	Massachusetts	5,630	Northeast
34	Hudson	New York	5,310	Northeast
35	Lexington	Kentucky	5,279	South
36	Wilmington	Delaware	5,268	South
37	Troy	New York	5,264	Northeast
38	Hartford	Connecticut	4,726	Northeast
39	Middleborough	Massachusetts	4,687	Northeast
40	Smithfield	Rhode Island	4,678	Northeast
41	Groton	Connecticut	4,664	Northeast
42	Taunton	Massachusetts	4,520	Northeast
43	Lynn	Massachusetts	4,515	Northeast
44	Middletown	New Jersey	4,369	Northeast
45	Plymouth	Massachusetts	4,348	Northeast
46	Reading	Pennsylvania	4,332	Northeast
47	Beverly	Massachusetts	4,283	Northeast
48	Woodbridge	New Jersey	4,226	Northeast
49	Deep River	Connecticut	4,165	Northeast
50	Fairfield	Connecticut	4,151	Northeast
51	Roxbury	Massachusetts	4,135	Northeast
52	Lyme	Connecticut	4,069	Northeast
53	Louisville	Kentucky	4,012	South
54	Evesham	New Jersey	3,977	Northeast
55	New Bedford	Massachusetts	3,947	Northeast
56	Trenton	New Jersey	3,942	Northeast
57	Schenectady	New York	3,939	Northeast
58	Springfield	Massachusetts	3,914	Northeast
59	Andover	Massachusetts	3,889	Northeast
60	Danbury	Connecticut	3,873	Northeast
61	Greenwich	Connecticut	3,790	Northeast
62	Gilmanton	New Hampshire	3,752	Northeast
63	South Kingstown	Rhode Island	3,723	Northeast
64	New Bern	North Carolina	3,663	South
65	Frederick	Maryland	3,640	South
66	York	Pennsylvania	3,545	Northeast
67	Fayetteville	North Carolina	3,532	South
68	Elizabeth	New Jersey	3,515	Northeast
69	Spring Garden	Pennsylvania	3,498	Northeast
70	Nashville	Tennessee	3,410	South
71	South Amboy	New Jersey	3,406	Northeast
72	East Hartford	Connecticut	3,375	Northeast
73	New London	Connecticut	3,330	Northeast
74	Bristol	Rhode Island	3,197	Northeast
75	East Hampton	Connecticut	3,159	Northeast
76	Coventry	Rhode Island	3,139	Northeast
77	Londonderry	New Hampshire	3,127	Northeast
78	Glastonbury	Connecticut	3,114	Northeast
79	Franklin, Somerset County	New Jersey	3,071	Northeast
80	Haverhill	Massachusetts	3,070	Northeast
81	Farmington	Connecticut	3,042	Northeast
82	Granby	Connecticut	3,012	Northeast
83	Norwalk	Connecticut	3,004	Northeast
84	Harrisburg	Pennsylvania	2,990	Northeast
85	Norwich	Connecticut	2,983	Northeast
86	Utica	New York	2,972	Northeast
87	Worcester	Massachusetts	2,962	Northeast
88	Carlisle	Pennsylvania	2,908	Northeast
89	Berlin	Connecticut	2,877	Northeast
90	Nassau	New York	2,873	Northeast
91	Dover	New Hampshire	2,871	Northeast
92	Concord	New Hampshire	2,838	Northeast
93	Orange	New Jersey	2,830	Northeast
94	Pittsfield	Massachusetts	2,768	Northeast
95	Raleigh	North Carolina	2,674	South
96	Hagerstown	Maryland	2,670	South
97	Cumberland	Rhode Island	2,653	Northeast
98	Piscataway	New Jersey	2,648	Northeast
99	Wilmington	North Carolina	2,633	South
100	Middletown	Connecticut	2,618	Northeast

== Gallery ==
Population density by county using census data.

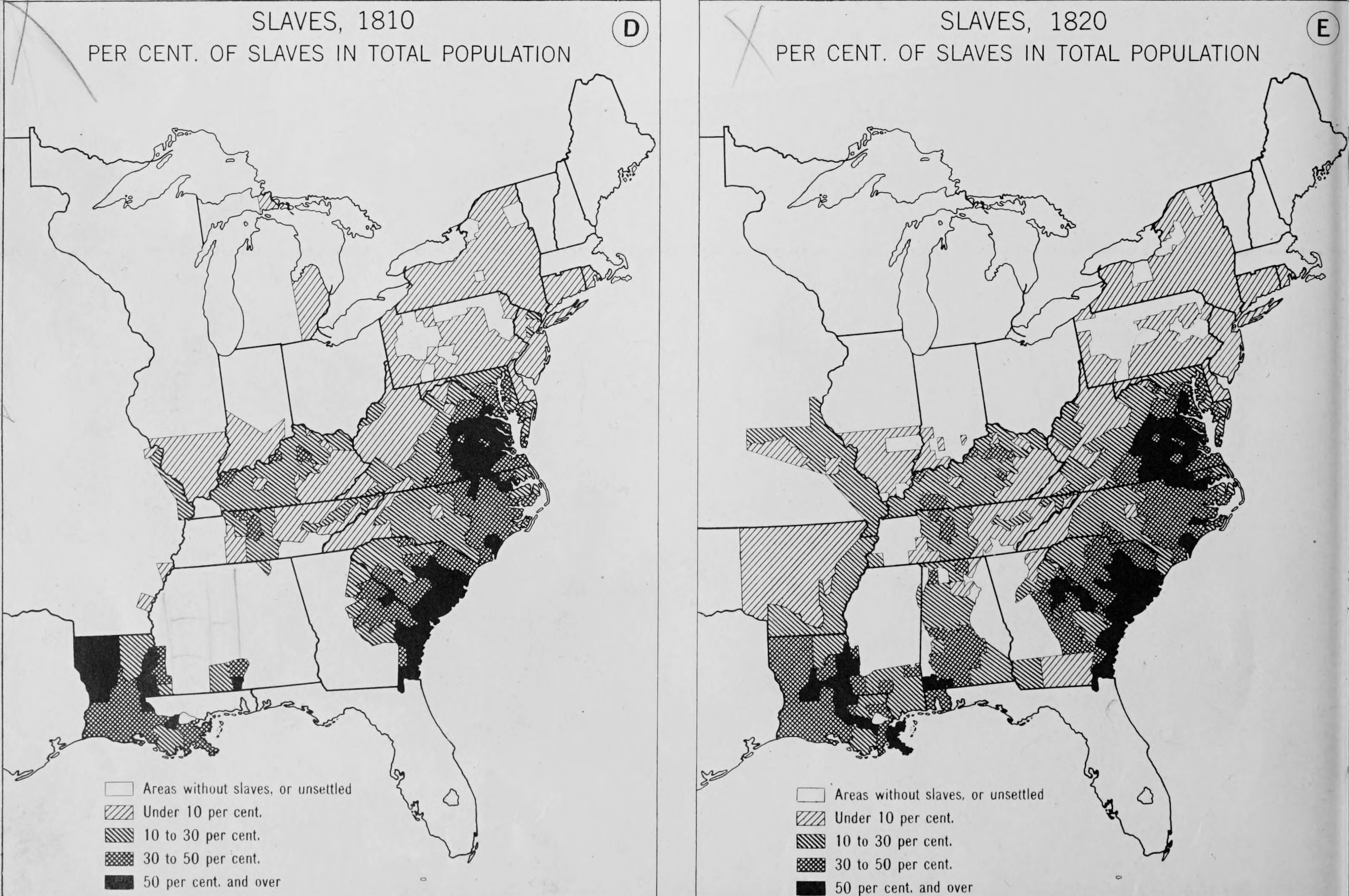
Slaves as a percentage of the total population in 1810 and 1820.
