= Kay Street–Catherine Street–Old Beach Road Historic District =

Historic district in Rhode Island, United States

- U.S. National Register of Historic Places
- U.S. Historic district
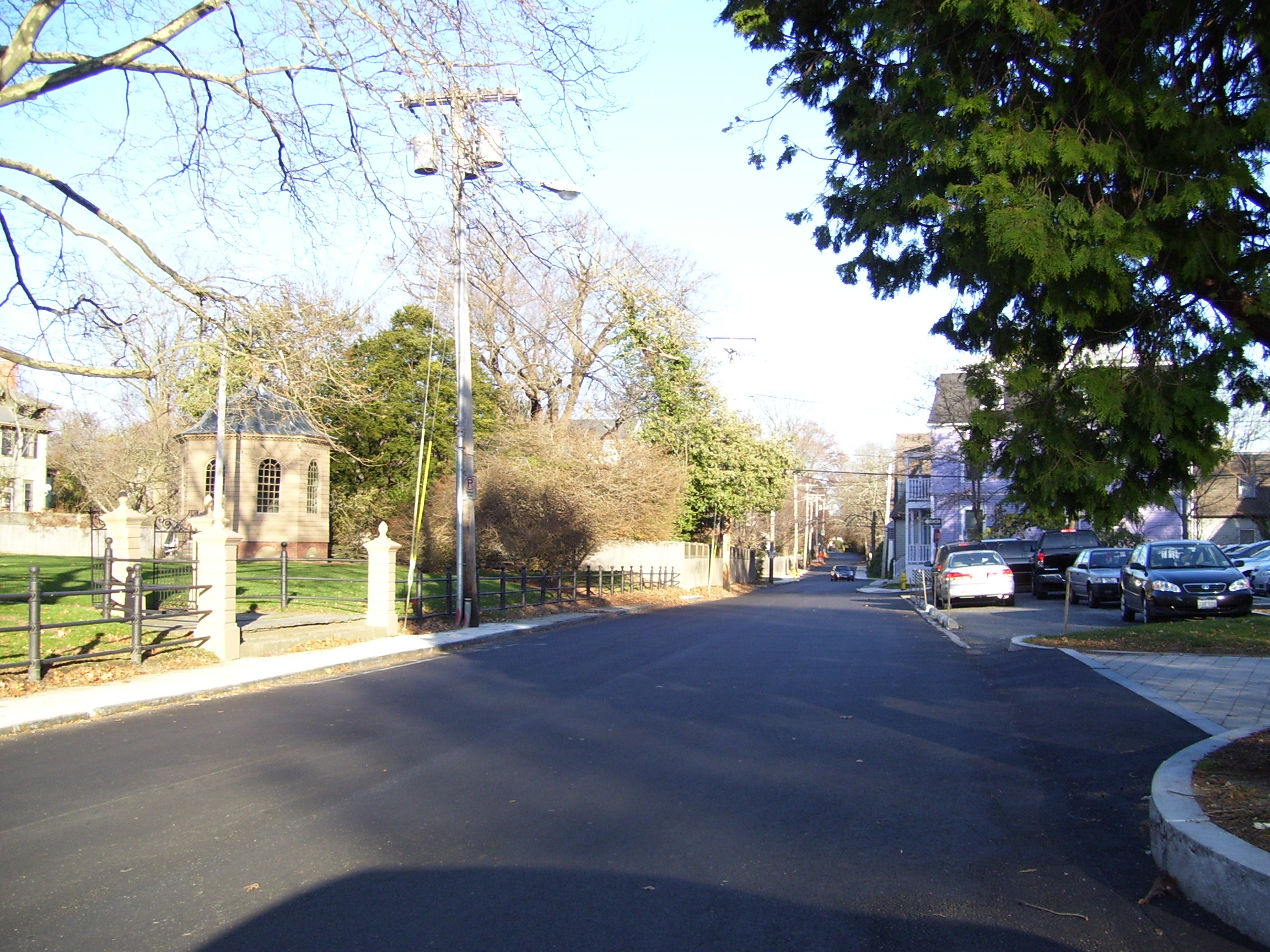
- Old Beach Road in 2008

- Location within Rhode Island Location within the United States
- Location: Roughly bounded by Broadway, Memorial Blvd., Whitfield Pl., Champlin & Sherman Sts., Rhode Island, Prairie & Gibbs Ave., Newport, Rhode Island
- Coordinates: 41°29′23″N 71°18′19″W
- Area: 260 acres (110 ha)
- Built: 1830
- Architect: Multiple
- Architectural style: Greek Revival, Stick/Eastlake, Queen Anne
- NRHP reference No.: 73000052; 100002193 (decrease)

Significant dates
- Added to NRHP: May 22, 1973
- Boundary decrease: March 12, 2018

The Kay Street–Catherine Street–Old Beach Road Historic District is a historic district in Newport, Rhode Island. The area is located north of Newport's well-known Bellevue Avenue, and encompasses an area that was developed residentially between about 1830 and 1890, for the most part before the Gilded Age mansions were built further south. The district is bounded on the south by Memorial Boulevard, on the east by Easton's Pond, on the west by Bellevue Avenue and Kay and Bull Streets, and on the north by Broadway, Rhode Island Avenue, Prairie Avenue, and Champlin Street. The district was added to the National Register of Historic Places on May 22, 1973, with a boundary decrease in 2018.

Notable properties that are included in this district are the Touro Synagogue, a National Historic Site, the Redwood Library and Athenaeum and the John Griswold House, both National Historic Landmarks, and the Newport Tower. The district also overlaps a portion of the Newport Historic District, a National Historic Landmark District.

== See also ==
- National Register of Historic Places listings in Newport County, Rhode Island
