= George G. Haven Jr. =

American businessman

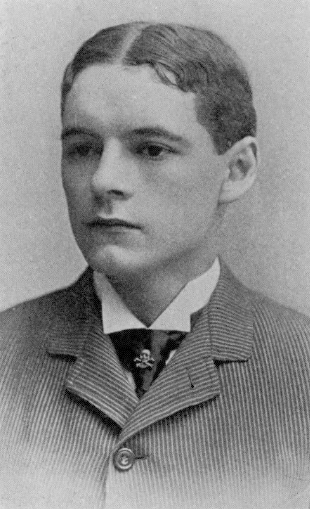
- Born: George Griswold Haven Jr. June 14, 1866; New York City, New York, U.S.
- Died: July 21, 1925 (aged 59); New York City, New York, U.S.
- Education: Hopkins Grammar School
- Alma mater: Yale University
- Spouses: Elizabeth Shaw Ingersoll (m. 1889; died 1923) Dorothy James (m. 1925)
- Children: 3
- Parent(s): George G. Haven; Emma Walton Martin Haven

George Griswold Haven Jr. (June 14, 1866 – July 21, 1925) was an American businessman.

== Early life ==
Haven was born in New York City on June 14, 1866. He was the son of George Griswold Haven Sr. (1837–1908) and Emma Walton (née Martin) Haven (1840–1873). Among his siblings was Cornelia Haven (wife of Stephen Peabody), Alice Griswold Haven (wife of John Nelson Borland), and Joseph Woodward Haven. His niece, Alice "Ella" Borland, was married to Orme Wilson Jr., the U.S. Ambassador to Haiti under Franklin D. Roosevelt.

His father, a prominent New Yorker, came from a family that had settled in New England in the earliest times. His maternal grandparents were Cornelia (née Walton) Martin and Isaac Parker, descendant of Joseph Martin, who came to the United States from the Canary Islands and settled in New York City. In 1898, his father purchased the former Callender estate on Narragansett Avenue in Newport, Rhode Island from Mrs. Frances Ogden. His grand-uncle was John N. A. Griswold.

George G. Haven Jr. attended St. John's Military School, in Ossining and the Hopkins Grammar School. He entered Yale College and graduated with the class of 1887. He was a member of Delta Kappa Epsilon, Hé Boulé and Skull and Bones.

== Career ==
After his graduation, Haven returned to New York City to enter the Lehigh & Wilkes Barre Coal Company. Following in his father's footsteps, Haven became interested in railroads, his next job being secretary and treasurer of the St. Paul & Duluth and New York and Northern Railways. He later became general manager of New York & Northern.

In 1896, Haven joined the firm Strong, Sturgis & Company, whom he represented on the New York Stock Exchange.

He was a director of the Denver & Rio Grande Railroad; the Texas & Pacific Railroad; the South Porto Rico Sugar Company; the Metallurgical Company; the Charleston & Ohio River Company; and the United States Mortgage & Trust Company. Haven also became a director of the Metropolitan Opera & Real Estate Company in 1910, becoming a senior member and treasurer in 1914. He was appointed President in 1919, a position his father had held just over ten years ago. Through the Metropolitan Opera, Haven became associated with such prominent New Yorkers as George F. Baker, J.P. Morgan, Otto H. Kahn and Robert F. Cutting.

== Personal life ==
Haven was married twice. He married his first wife, Elizabeth Shaw Ingersoll (1860–1923), the daughter of Charles Roberts Ingersoll, a former Governor of Connecticut, on September 4, 1889. Together, they were the parents of:

- Leila Ingersoll Haven (1890–1974), who married Gilbert Edward Jones Jr. (1888–1925).
- George Griswold Haven III (1892–1944), who married Elizabeth George (1896–1990) in 1925.
- Alice Haven (1895–1946), who married George Schieffelin Trevor (1892–1951) in 1915. They divorced and she later married William Otis Waters (1889–1940).

Two years after the death of his first wife, he married Dorothy James on February 4, 1925, the daughter of Henry Ammon James and Laura Brevoort (née Sedgwick) James. In early 1924, Haven suffered a nervous breakdown. He retired from business and began traveling in hope of regaining his health, but on July 21, 1925, Haven shot himself through the head with a revolver, at his home on Fifty-third Street, New York City. He was interred at Green-Wood Cemetery. His estate was left to his widow and children.
