= Frank Gray Griswold =

American financier and writer

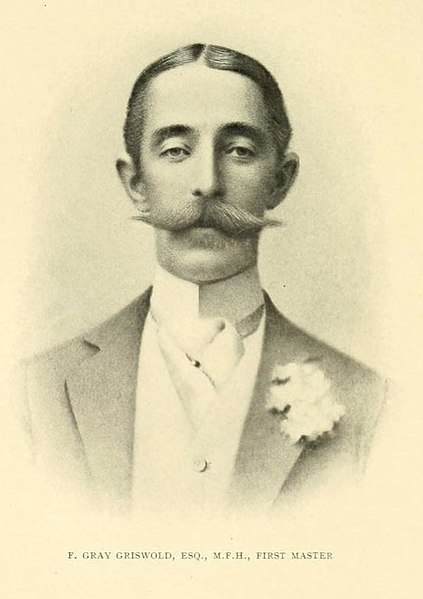
- Griswold in 1908
- Born: December 21, 1854; New York City, New York, U.S.
- Died: March 30, 1937 (aged 82); New York City, New York, U.S.
- Occupations: Writer, sportsmen
- Spouse: Josephine Houghteling Canfield (m. 1907)
- Parent(s): George Griswold; Lydia Alley Griswold
- Relatives: Mariana Van Rensselaer (sister)

Frank Gray Griswold (December 21, 1854 – March 30, 1937) was an American financier and writer who was a prominent member of New York society during the Gilded Age.

== Early life ==
Griswold was born on December 21, 1854, at the family home, 91 Fifth Avenue in New York City. He was the son of George Griswold Jr. (1820–1884) and Lydia (née Alley) Griswold (1826–1908). His siblings included architecture critic Mariana Griswold, who married Schuyler Van Rensselaer; George Griswold, the vice president and general manager of the Tuxedo Park Association; Louisa Alley Griswold, who married Harald de Raasloff; and Baroness von Sternbeck of Munich.

His paternal grandparents were George Griswold and Maria Matilda (née Cumming) Griswold. The Griswolds were relatives of American bishops Alexander Viets Griswold, Sheldon Munson Griswold, and Frank Griswold. His maternal grandparents were Mary (née Underhill) Alley and Saul Alley, a commissioner of the Croton Aqueduct. A member of the prominent Griswold Family, his family's wealth originated from the China trade as his father and grandfather were merchants with "N. L. and G. Griswold", which owned clipper ships that imported tea and silks from East Asia. In 1868, he moved with his family to Dresden, Germany, where they remained for five years. He was educated in Vienna, Austria and then in Dresden, where he graduated from the Handelschule in 1875.

== Career ==
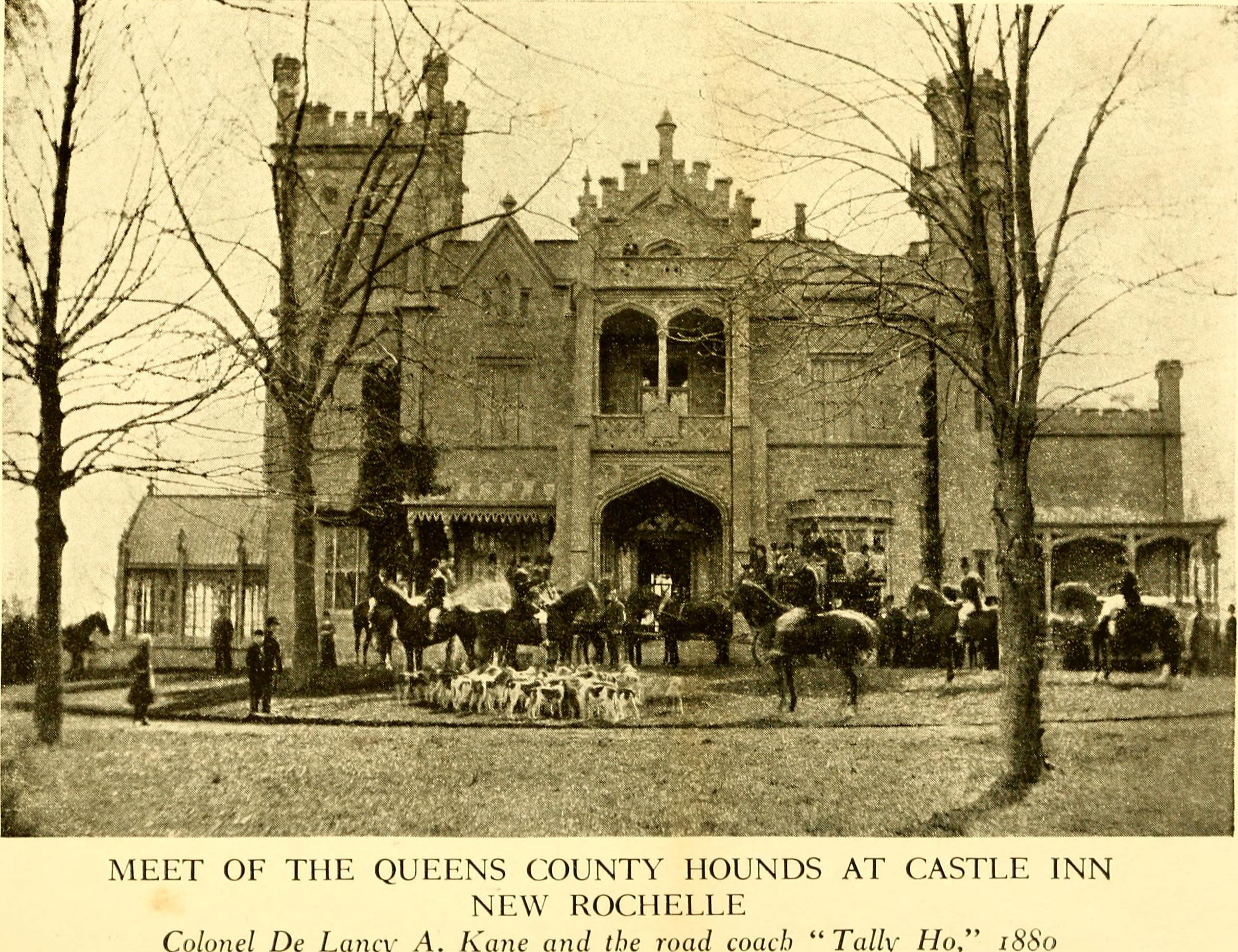
Meet of Griswold's Queen's County Hounds, 1913

Griswold was a financier. A friend and cousin of Pierre Lorillard, he served as a director and important executive of the Lorillard Tobacco Company from 1879 to 1893.

He was also a writer, publishing several well known works including The International Polo Cup, a history of the event from their beginning through 1927; as well as Sport on Land and Water: Recollections of Frank Gray Griswold, privately published in 1913, 1915, 1916, 1916, 1917, 1920, 1923, and 1931; Horses and Hounds: Recollections of Frank Gray Griswold, published by Harper & Brothers in 1926; After Thoughts: Recollections of Frank Gray Griswold, also published by Harper & Brothers in 1936. He occasionally wrote under the pseudonym "Anthony Ashley, Jr."

=== Society life ===
In 1892, the bachelor Griswold was included in Ward McAllister's "Four Hundred", purported to be an index of New York's best families, published in The New York Times. Conveniently, 400 was the number of people that could fit into Mrs. Astor's ballroom. For several years, he was well known as a cotillion leader, and "long occupied a place in the inner circle of New York clubmen and aristocratic sportsmen."

Griswold was a supporter of the Metropolitan Opera, and, as an avid fisherman and keen fox hunter, he was a member of the Meadow Brook Club, Rockaway Hunting Club and Newport Country Club. He imported hounds from England and formed the Queen's County Hounds, for which he served as Master for many years. He was also a member of the New York Yacht Club, the Union Club of the City of New York, and the Knickerbocker Club.

== Personal life ==
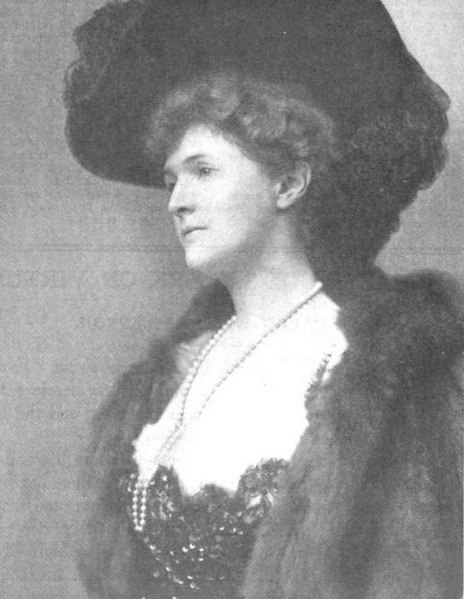
Griswold's wife, Josephine (née Houghteling) Canfield Griswold.

In 1907, 53 year-old Griswold was married to noted beauty, Josephine (née Houghteling) Canfield (1864–1937) at St. Andrews Church in Westminster, London in a small wedding that was attended by U.S. Ambassador Whitelaw Reid. She was the daughter of William DeZeng Houghteling and Marcia Elizabeth (née Stockbridge) Houghteling and the sister of James Lawrence Houghteling, who founded the Episcopal Brotherhood of St. Andrew. Josephine had been widowed in 1904 following the death of her first husband, wealthy engineer and yachtsman Augustus Cass Canfield, who was a grandson of Presidential candidate Lewis Cass. Josephine was the mother of three, including Cass Canfield, the publishing executive who was the longtime president and chairman of Harper & Brothers, later Harper & Row.

The Griswolds owned a large red brick home designed by McKim, Mead & White in Roslyn, New York, known as Cassleigh. Their home was burgled in 1916 and they were robbed of $110,000 worth of jewelry. They later had a home known as Kina in New York and spent much time abroad.

In his obituary in The New York Times, he was described thusly:

"In appearance he is an ideal weight and figure for riding. Tall, slender, lithe, with an anglicized drooping mustache, a manner that is courteously indifferent, and a way of talking that insinuates worldliness and assurance. Mr. Griswold is probably the most accomplished master of the hounds in America and the most experienced. He has 'run to hounds' in Leicestershire, in the South of France, in any place where fox hunting is encouraged."

Griswold died at his home, 783 Park Avenue in New York City, on March 30, 1937. His funeral was held at St. Bartholomew's Church on Park Avenue and he was buried at Green-Wood Cemetery in Brooklyn, New York. His widow died shortly thereafter on September 29, 1937.

== Published works ==
- The Horse and Buggy Days, (Norwood, Mass. Privately printed Plimpton Press, 1936 [limited 150 copies])
- After thoughts: Recollections of Frank Gray Griswold, (New York Privately printed Norwood, Mass., Plimpton Press, 1936)
- The Cascapedia Club, (1920)
- Horses and hounds: Recollections of Frank Gray Griswold, (New York, Dutton, 1926)
- The life-history of the Atlantic and Pacific salmon of Canada, also by R. D. Hume, (New York, Duttons, 1930)
- The Memoirs of a Salmon, (Norwood, Mass. Privately printed Plimpton Press, 1931)
- Observations on a Salmon River, (Mineola, L.I., N.Y., Privately printed for Thomas Gibbons, 1922)
- Observations on a Salmon River, (Norwood, Mass. Privately printed Plimpton Press, 1921)
- Observations on a Salmon River, also by Henry Charles Keith Petty-FitzMaurice Lansdowne, (Norwood, Mass. Plimpton, 1922)
- Observations on a Salmon River, (Norwood, Mass. Plimpton Press 1921)
- Salmo salar (Norwood, Mass. Privately printed Plimpton Press, 1929)
- A salmon river, (New York, Dutton, 1928)
- Some fish and some fishing, (New York, John Lane Company; London, John Lane, 1921)
- Sport on land and water: Recollections, (Norwood, Mass. Privately printed Plimpton Press, 1913–16)
- Sport on land and water: Recollections of Frank Gray Griswold, (Norwood, Mass. Privately printed Plimpton Press, 1913–1931), also by John A. Seaverns Equine Collection (Tufts University)
- Stolen kisses: Recollections of Frank Gray Griswold, (Norwood, Mass. : Privately printed, 1914)
- The Tarpon, (New York, Privately printed, 1922)
- French Wines & Havana Cigars, (New York, Duttons, 1926 [limited 300 copies])
