= John Augustus Griswold =

American politician

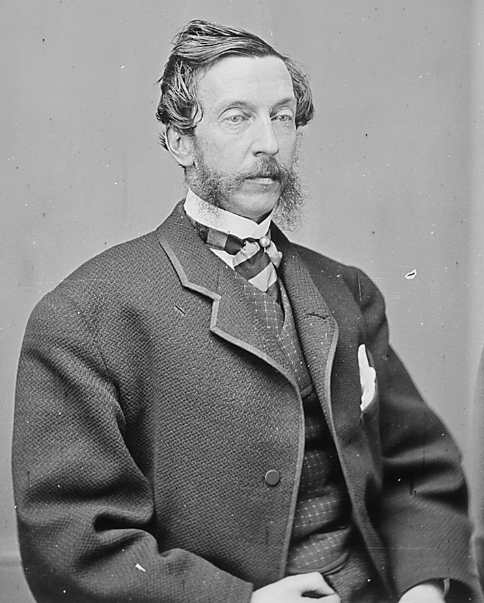

Member of the U.S. House of Representatives from New York's 15th district
- In office March 4, 1863 – March 3, 1869
- Preceded by: James B. McKean
- Succeeded by: Adolphus H. Tanner

Personal details
- Born: November 11, 1818 Nassau, New York, U.S.
- Died: October 31, 1872 (aged 53) Troy, New York, U.S.
- Resting place: Oakwood Cemetery
- Party: Republican (1865-1869)
- Other political affiliations: Democratic (1863-1865)
- Spouse: Elizabeth Hart (after 1843)
- Children: 6
- Parent: Chester Griswold
- Relatives: Simeon Griswold (grandfather)
- Occupation: Politician, businessman, shipbuilder

John Augustus Griswold (November 11, 1818 – October 31, 1872) was an American businessman and politician from New York. He served three terms in the U.S. House of Representatives from 1863 to 1869.

== Early life ==
Griswold was born on November 11, 1818, in Nassau, Rensselaer County, New York. He was the son of Chester Griswold. He was the only son born to his parents and he had one sister, who was married to Isaac B. Hart, Esq., of the firm of Hart, Lesley & Warren, in Troy.

He was a member of the Griswold political family, his father the Hon. Chester Griswold filled several positions of public trust, serving a number of years as supervisor of Nassau, and was for three years (1823, 1831 and 1835) one of the members of the New York State Assembly representing the County of Rensselaer. His grandfather Simeon Griswold served as a five time member of the Massachusetts House of Representatives.

== Career ==
Griswold was educated for commercial pursuits, and at the age of seventeen entered the iron and hardware house of Messrs. Hart, Lesley & Warren, in Troy. He remained at the firm for some time living in the family of his uncle, Maj.-Gen. John E. Wool there after engaging in business for himself in banking and iron works creating at the time, one of the largest and most successful establishments in the United States, known as the Albany and Rensselaer Iron and Steel Works, located in Troy.

In 1857, Griswold became a large owner of the iron mills of Troy having been granted the U.S. Bessemer steel process patents important for expanding the Rensselaer Iron and Steel Works business.

During the early part of the Civil War, Griswold built at his personal expense the first iron-clad Ericsson warship, the USS Monitor to combat the confederate converted frigate the Merrimac, which was subsequently defeated by the Monitor in a historic naval battle in 1862. Griswold was later involved in the production of other "Monitor" vessels, including the Dictator, Kaatskill, Lehigh, Montauk, Passaic, Patapsco, Puritan and Sangamon.

Griswold assisted in raising the 30th New York Volunteer Infantry Regiment, 125th New York Volunteer Infantry Regiment, and 169th New York Volunteer Infantry; and personally raised the 21st New York Cavalry Regiment, the "Griswold Light Cavalry".

=== Public office ===
He was elected mayor of Troy, New York, in 1855. He was president of the Troy and Lansingburgh Railroad, of the Troy and Cohoes Railroad and of the New Orleans, Mobile and Texas Railroad.

=== Congress ===
Griswold first received the Democratic nomination for Congress in 1857, but was defeated by Abram B. Olin. However, he was later elected as a Democrat to the 38th and as a Republican to the 39th and 40th United States Congresses, serving from March 4, 1863, to March 3, 1869. While in Congress, he served on the Committee on Naval Affairs and the House Committee on Ways and Means. In 1868, he was the Republican candidate for Governor of New York, but was defeated by Democrat John Thompson Hoffman.

During his lone term as a Democrat, Griswold was one of 14 House Democrats to vote in favor of the Thirteenth Amendment to the United States Constitution on its second and final vote, and also one of 4 to vote in favor of it on its first vote.

Griswold was interested in education, particularly in the areas of science and technology, and served as a trustee of the Rensselaer Polytechnic Institute (RPI); he led the reconstruction movement after RPI and parts of Troy were destroyed by the Great Troy Fire of 1862. Griswold was elected a Regent of the University of the State of New York on April 29, 1869.

In 1871, President Ulysses S. Grant offered the post of Collector of the Port of New York to Griswold, who declined. He then offered it to William Orton, who also declined. Griswold and Orton both recommended Chester A. Arthur; Arthur received the appointment and served until 1878.

== Personal life ==
On September 14, 1843, John Griswold was married to Elizabeth Hart (1822–1891), daughter of Richard P. Hart, Esq., at Troy. Together, they had six children: three sons and three daughters, including:

- Harriette Hart Griswold (1854–1938), who married Joseph Warren Burden (1852–1903), a grandson of Henry Burden and first cousin of James A. Burden Jr. and Arthur Scott Burden (first husband of Cynthia Roche), in 1881.
- Francis Baylis Griswold (d. 1923).
- Chester Griswold II (1844 - 1902) - Partner in John A. Griswold & Co. with Erastus Corning; Fleet Captain of the New York Yacht Club.

Griswold died on October 31, 1872, shortly after being diagnosed with liver disease. He was buried at the Oakwood Cemetery in Troy.

Party political offices
Preceded by Reuben Fenton	Republican nominee for Governor of New York; 1868	Succeeded by Stewart L. Woodford
U.S. House of Representatives
Preceded by James B. McKean	Member of the U.S. House of Representatives from New York's 15th congressional district 1863–1869	Succeeded by Adolphus H. Tanner
