= Morea (Charlottesville, Virginia) =

Historic house in Virginia, United States

- U.S. National Register of Historic Places
- Virginia Landmarks Register
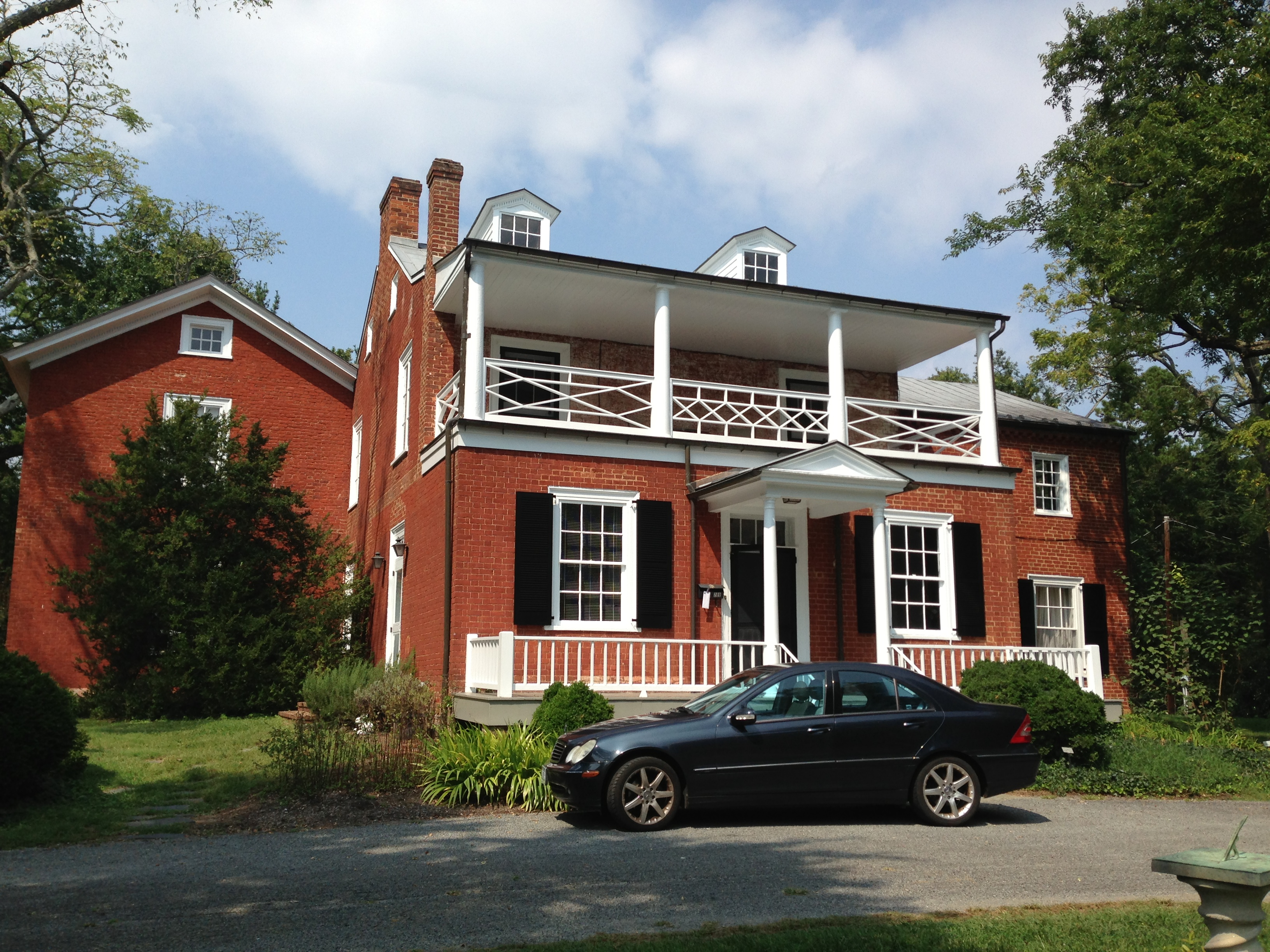
- Morea, September 2013

- Location within Virginia Location within the United States
- Location: 209-211 Sprigg Lane, Charlottesville, Virginia
- Coordinates: 38°2′22″N 78°30′31″W
- Area: 2.6 acres (1.1 ha)
- Built: 1835
- Built by: Emmet, John Patten
- NRHP reference No.: 84003522
- VLR No.: 104-0044

Significant dates
- Added to NRHP: May 3, 1984
- Designated VLR: March 20, 1984

Morea is a historic home located at Charlottesville, Virginia. It was built in 1835, and is a 2 1/2-story, three-bay, vernacular brick dwelling. It features an original recessed second-story verandah, an interior structural arcade, and a semidetached office wing. It is the only surviving dwelling built by one of the original University of Virginia faculty members approved by Thomas Jefferson. Its owner, John Patten Emmet, was the school's first professor of natural history. It is now owned by the University of Virginia and serves as the co-residence for both the Principal and the Director of Studies of the International Residential College.

It was listed on the National Register of Historic Places in 1984.
