= Newport Art Museum =

Coordinates: 41.485534°N 71.308221°W

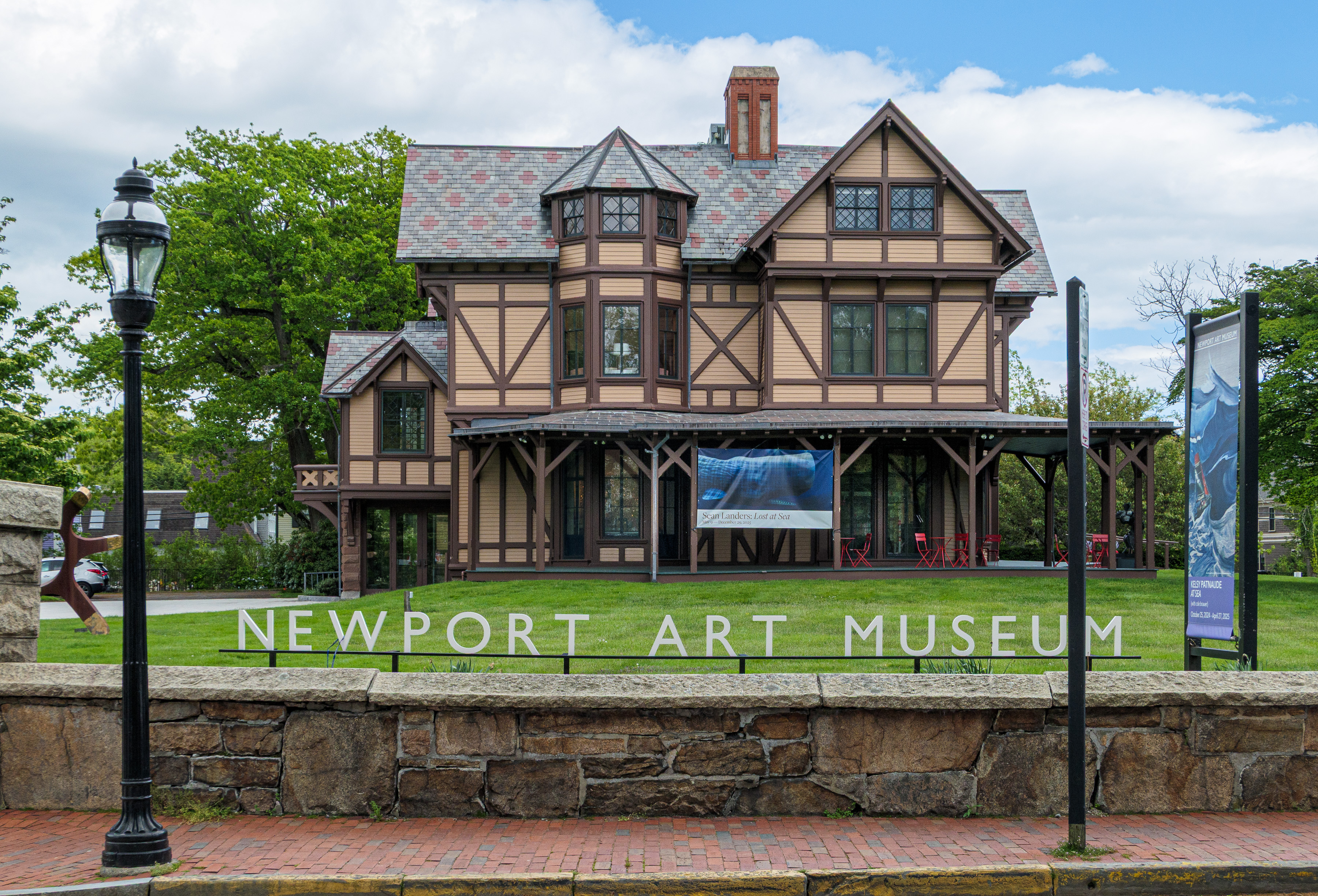
The John N. A. Griswold House, designed by architect Richard Morris Hunt, was purchased in 1915 and converted into an art gallery.

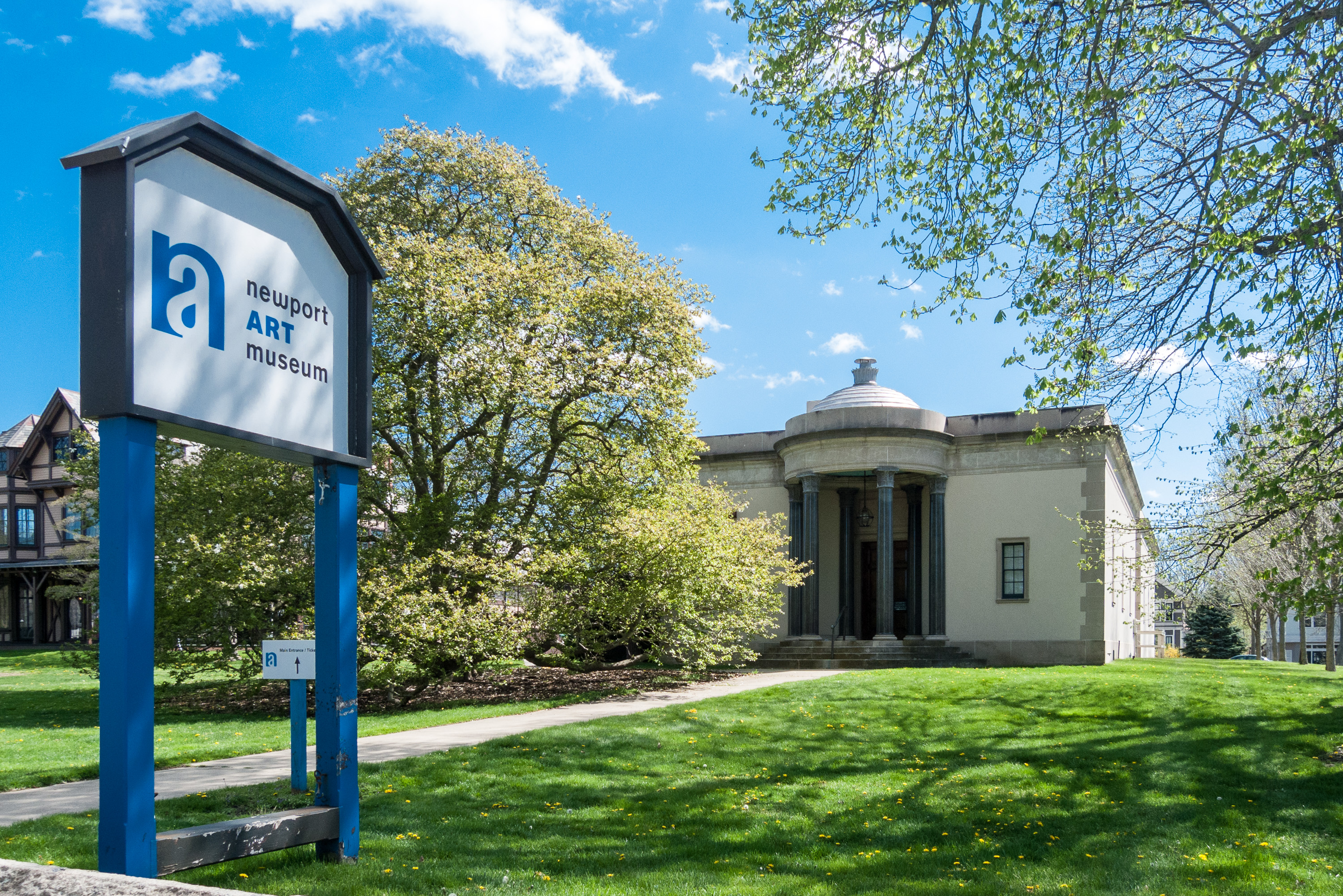
The museum's Morris/Cushing Gallery was built in 1919 and designed by architects Delano & Aldrich.

The Newport Art Museum, founded in 1912 as the Art Association of Newport, is located at 76 Bellevue Avenue in Newport, Rhode Island. The museum operates a gallery in the John N. A. Griswold House, a National Historic Landmark that is one of the first American Stick Style buildings. It was designed by the noted American architect, Richard Morris Hunt in 1864 and one was one of his first commissions in Newport. The museum purchased the house in 1915.

The museum's second gallery space was built in 1919 and was designed by Delano & Aldrich. Dedicated to the memory of the artist Howard Gardiner Cushing, the museum added the Sarah Rives lobby and Morris Gallery to the building in 1990.

The museum's school is the Coleman Center for Creative Studies at 26 Liberty Street.

== History ==
The Museum has its origin in the Art Association of Newport, which later became the Newport Art Association. It is one of the oldest continuously operating art associations in the United States. The association started during the art colony and Impressionist movements and was connected to the New York art scene. In 1916 the Association acquired the Griswold House to use as a gallery.

Today the museum has many notable works particularly from Rhode Island and New England artists, including William Trost Richards, John Frederick Kensett, John La Farge, Gilbert Stuart, and Catharine Morris Wright as well as many contemporary artists.

== 2024 Changes ==
In the summer of 2024, the museum moved to a new staffing model, featuring collaborative efforts and the use of guest curators to offer a new approach for its exhibitions. Spokespeople for the Independent Curators International and the American Alliance of Museums raised concerns about the museum's practices in response to these changes.

Currently, the Museum employs collections and exhibition-related staff and offers a full schedule of changing exhibitions.
