= John N. A. Griswold House =

Historic house in Rhode Island, United States

- U.S. National Register of Historic Places
- U.S. National Historic Landmark
- U.S. Historic district – Contributing property
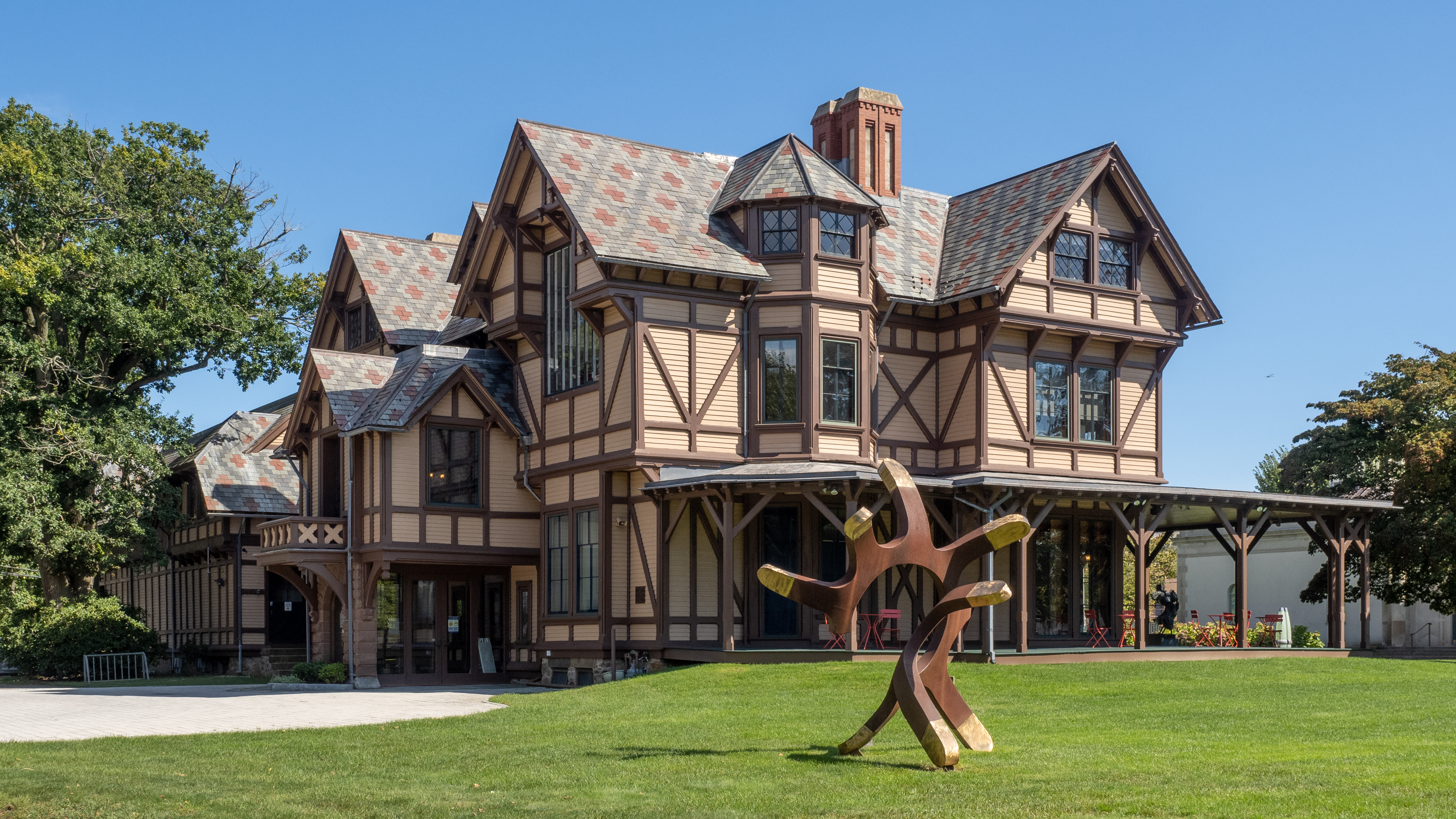

- Location within Rhode Island Location within the United States
- Interactive map showing the location of Griswold House
- Location: 76 Bellevue Ave, Newport, RI
- Coordinates: 41°29′9″N 71°18′32″W
- Area: 2.41 acres (0.98 ha)
- Built: 1864
- Architect: Richard Morris Hunt
- Architectural style: American Stick Style
- Part of: Kay Street-Catherine Street-Old Beach Road Historic District (ID73000052)
- NRHP reference No.: 71000023

Significant dates
- Added to NRHP: November 5, 1971
- Designated NHL: May 16, 2000
- Designated CP: May 22, 1973

The John N. A. Griswold House is a historic house located at 76 Bellevue Avenue in Newport, Rhode Island. It was built in 1864 for John Noble Alsop Griswold, an Old China Trade merchant and member of the Griswold Family, and was designed by Richard Morris Hunt in the American Stick style, one of the earliest buildings in that style, and one of Hunt's first works in Newport.

The house was added to the National Register of Historic Places in 1971, and was designated a National Historic Landmark in 2000. It is now one of the galleries of the Newport Art Museum, and is a project of Save America’s Treasures.

== Description and history ==
The Griswold House is a 2 1/2-story wood-frame structure, set on a granite foundation, on a parcel that was landscaped in the early 19th century to a design by the Olmsted Brothers. It has a complex roofline, whose main mansarded section is pierced by numerous gable and dormer sections. The roof is finished with bands of polychrome slate, and is enhanced by chimneys with concrete caps and decorative panels. There are numerous balconies sheltered by deep eaves, with gable ends decorated with applied Stick style woodwork. An expansive veranda wraps around the southern and western sides of the house, with an elaborately decorated port-cochere on the north side.

The exterior Stick style theme of applied woodwork is continued inside, where the public rooms feature extensive woodwork, and richly decorated spaces. A number of rooms are either partially or completely octagonal in shape, including the main hall, the dining room, and the library. The main hall features an elaborately decorated staircase, with a carved griffin statue standing guard at its base.

The house was designed by Richard Morris Hunt and built in 1864 for John Noble Alsop Griswold, a merchant in the China Trade. It was the first of Hunt's many notable works in Newport, and is considered a prototype work of the Stick style of architecture. Griswold died in the house in 1909; it remained vacant until 1915, when it was acquired by the Art Association of Newport, which now uses it as a museum gallery. The association is one of the oldest organizations of its type in the United States.

The house was listed on the National Register of Historic Places in 1971, and was designated a National Historic Landmark in 2000, in recognition for its architectural significance and its association with the Art Association of Newport.

== Gallery ==
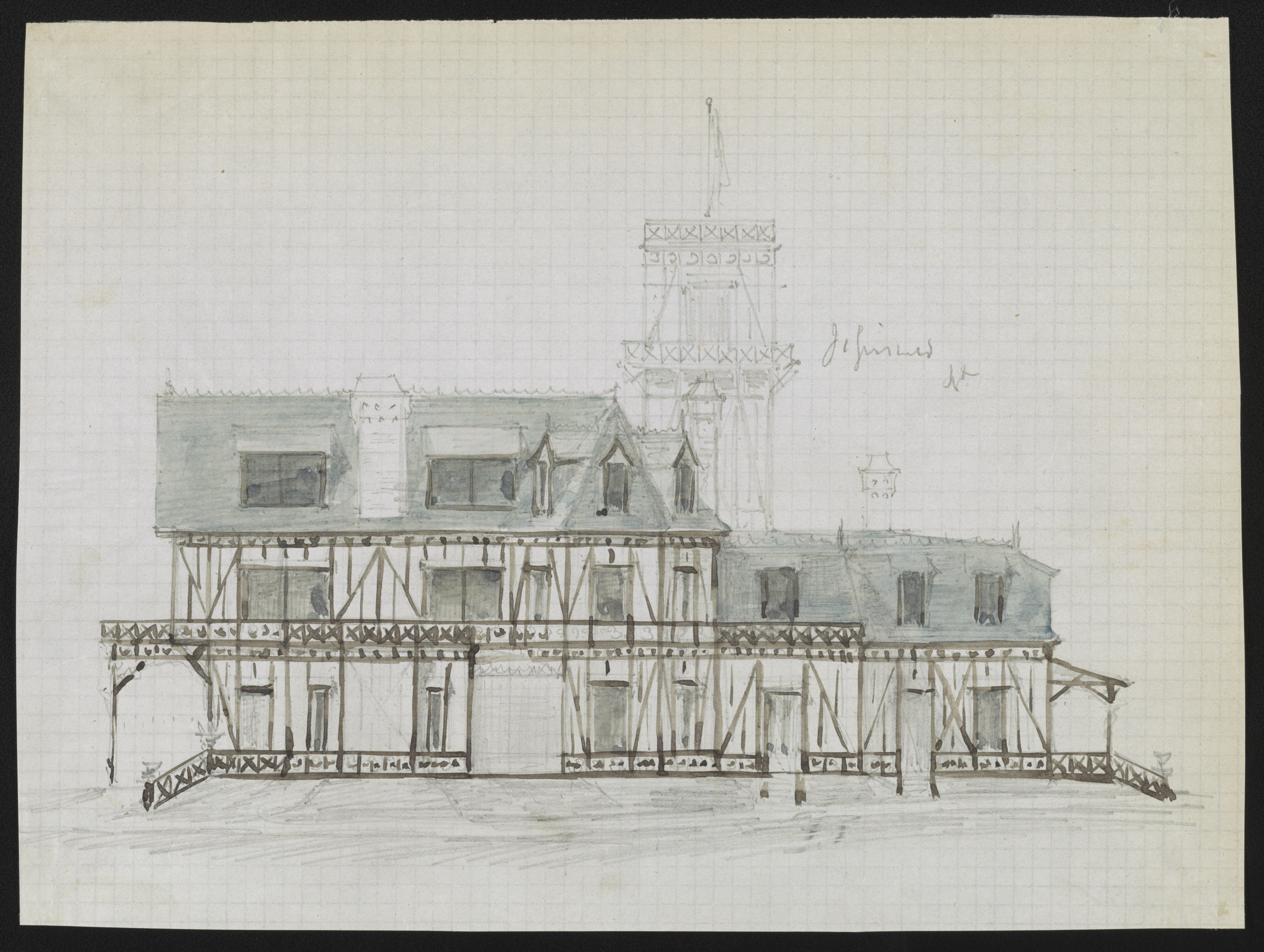
1862 sketch

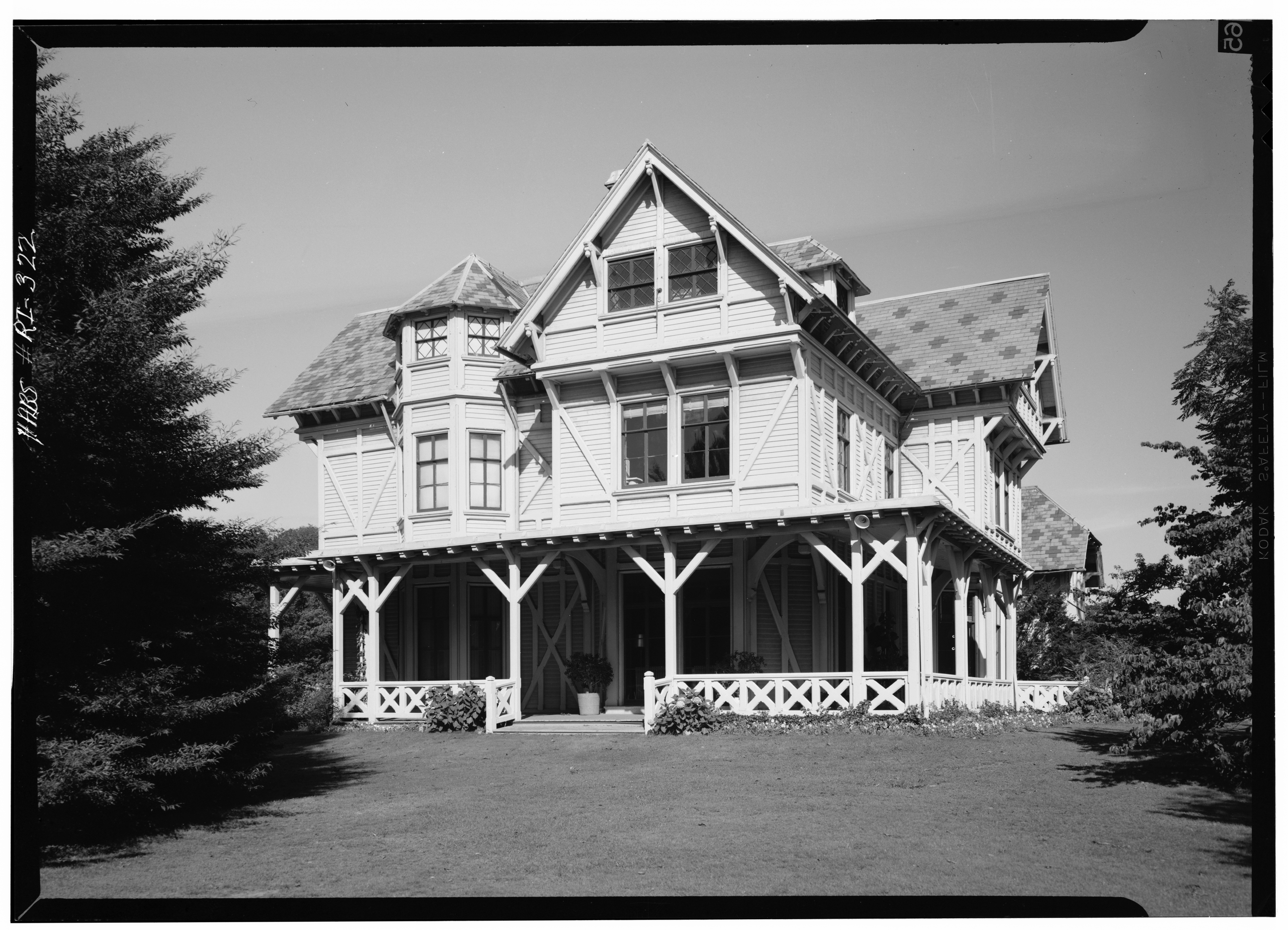
West Facade

First floor plan

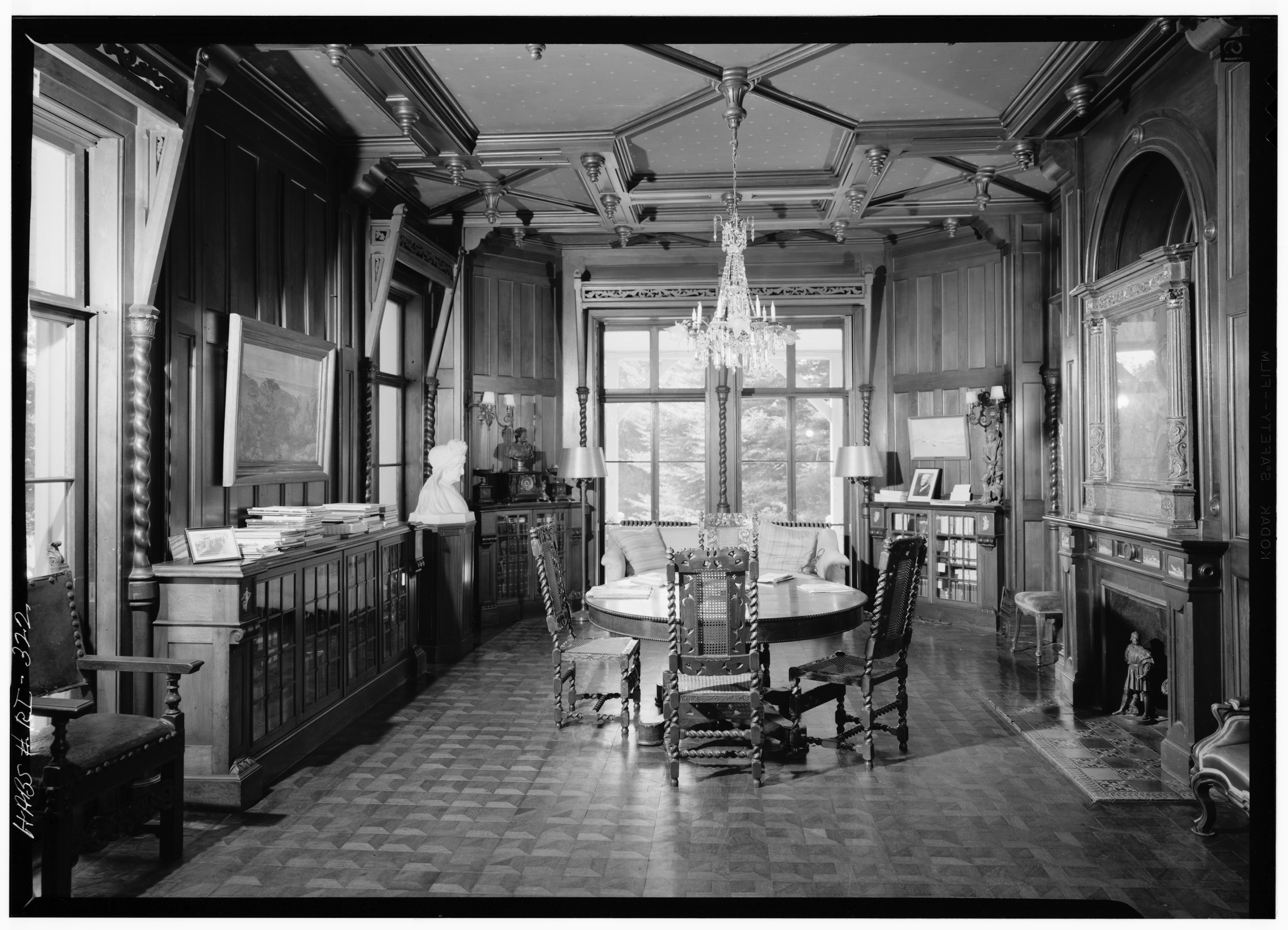
The library

== See also ==
- List of National Historic Landmarks in Rhode Island
- National Register of Historic Places listings in Newport County, Rhode Island
