= Mariana Griswold Van Rensselaer =

American author

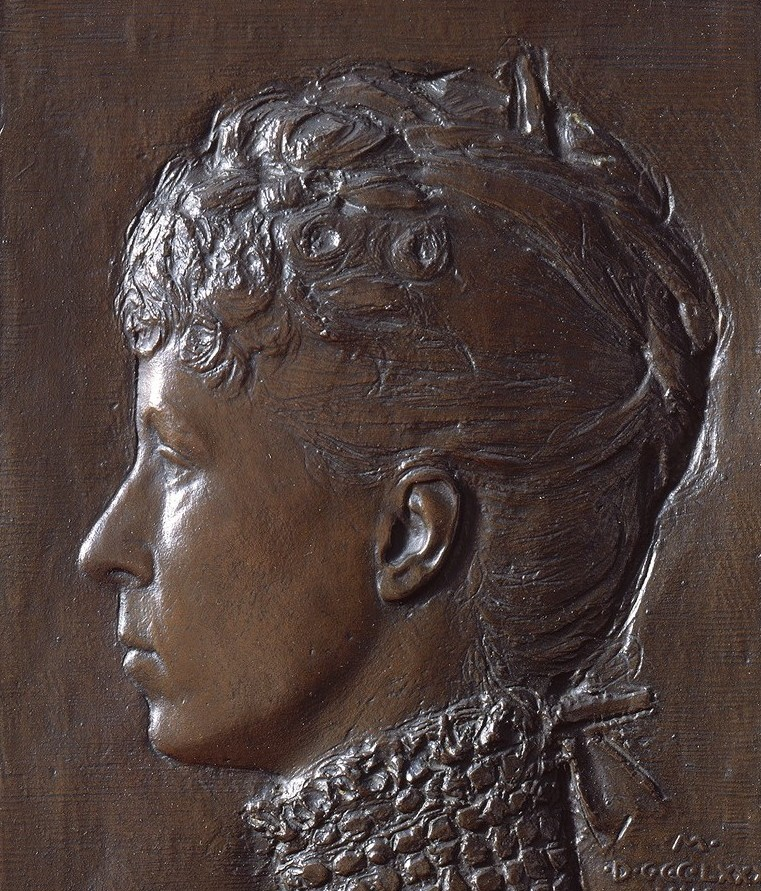
- Bronze relief portrait by Augustus Saint-Gaudens, 1888
- Born: Mariana Alley Griswold; February 21, 1851; New York City, New York, U.S.
- Died: January 20, 1934 (aged 82); New York City, New York, U.S.
- Education: Columbia University
- Occupations: Critic and writer
- Spouse: Schuyler Van Rensselaer (m. 1873; died 1884)
- Children: George Griswold Van Rensselaer
- Parent(s): George Griswold Jr. Lydia Alley
- Awards: American Academy of Arts and Letters Gold Medal

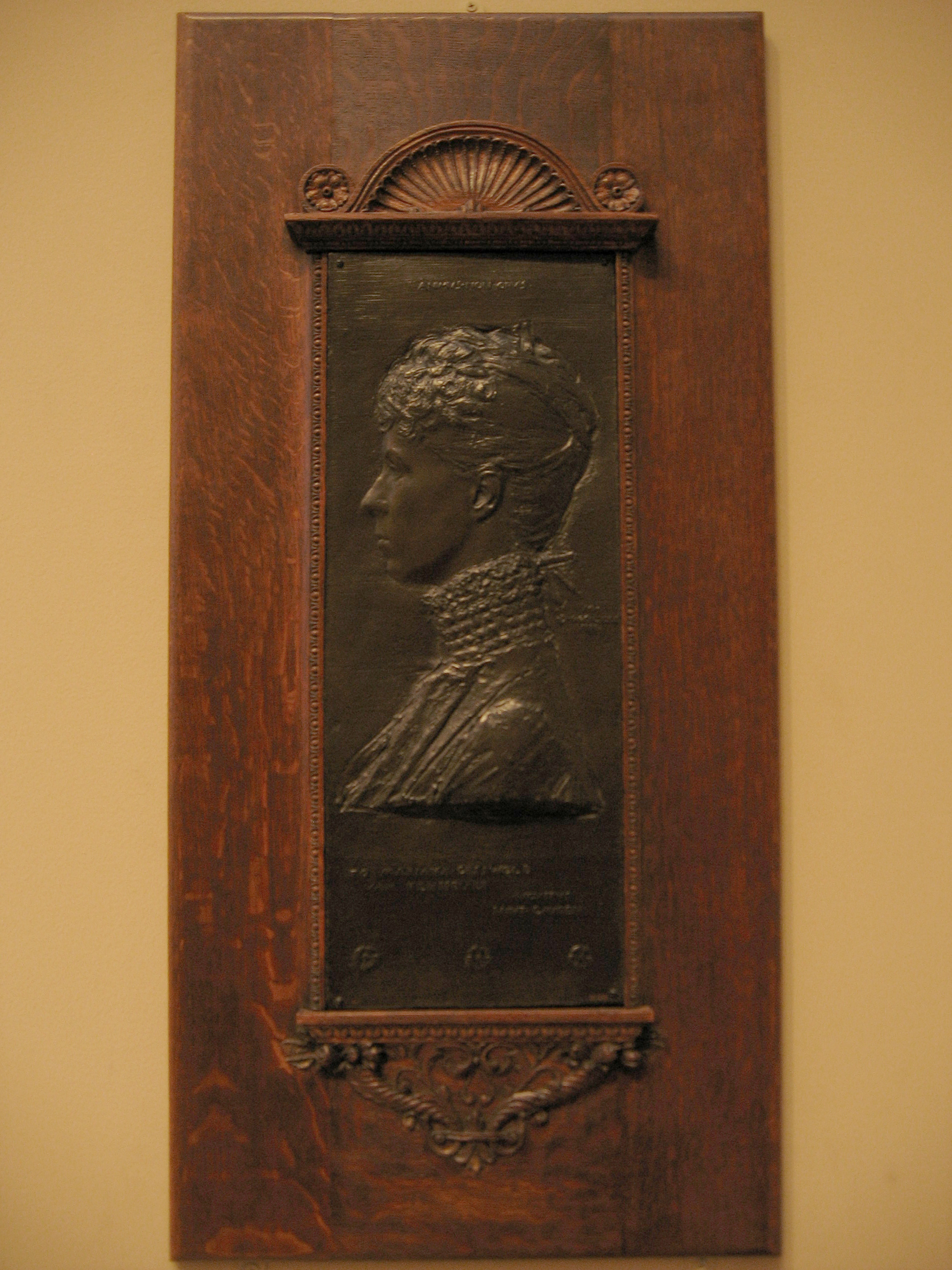
Bronze relief portrait of Mariana Griswold by Augustus Saint-Gaudens, 1888. Metropolitan Museum of Art, New York City.

Mariana Alley Griswold Van Rensselaer (February 21, 1851 – January 20, 1934), usually known as Mrs. Schuyler Van Rensselaer or M. G. Van Rensselaer, was an American author focusing on architectural criticism. She wrote articles in American Art Review, Century Magazine, and Garden and Forest (in which she wrote many unattributed articles).

== Early life ==
Mariana Alley Griswold was born in New York City in 1851. She was the daughter of George Griswold Jr. and Lydia (née Alley) Griswold (1826–1908). Her younger brothers were Frank Gray Griswold (1855–1937), the stepfather of Cass Canfield, and George Griswold (1857–1917), the vice-president and general manager of the Tuxedo Park Association.

In 1868, she moved with her family to Dresden, Germany, where she remained for five years.

== Career ==
Van Rensselaer began writing in 1876. The first woman architectural critic, she grew in influence in the 1880s. However, her publications encompassed also art and landscape architecture criticism, fiction, and children's literature. After refuting an offer to edit the American Art Review in 1881, she began writing for Century Magazine. She advocated that the public should view architectural works, not as just the work of the individual firm owners, but the entire firm (particularly about McKim, Mead, and White), and preferred architectural training at colleges for creating intellectual and genteel architects, rather than the on-the-job training, which was common at the time.

Around 1890, Van Rensselaer garnered an honorary membership to the American Institute of Architects, and in 1920 to the American Society of Landscape Architects In 1910, she received the degree of D. Litt. from Columbia University, the accomplishment being an extraordinary one for a woman at that time. She was awarded the 1923 American Academy of Arts and Letters Gold Medal. In 1915, in honor of their deceased son, George, she donated a collection of reproductions of frescoes, vases, and other objects which illustrate the prehistoric culture of Greece to Fogg Art Museum of Harvard University.

Van Rensselaer also served several charitable organisations, including University Settlement Women's Auxiliary (president from 1896 to 1898), Jacob A. Riis Neighborhood Settlement, and the New York Infirmary for Women and Children. She was president of the Public Education Association of New York from 1899 to 1906. Although she did vote in 1893 while living in Colorado, she later was involved with New York State Association Opposed to the Extension of Suffrage for Women.

== Personal life ==
In 1873, she married Schuyler Van Rensselaer (1845–1884) of the prominent Van Rensselaer family. Together, they lived in New Brunswick, New Jersey. They had one child, born in February 1875, before her husband, a mining engineer, died in March 1884. Her father died, in his early 60s, the following month.

- George Griswold Van Rensselaer (1875–1894), who died during the family's time in Colorado, aged 19, and was a member of Harvard University's class of 1896.

Van Rensselaer died away while in New York City on January 20, 1934. She was buried next to her husband and only child at Green-Wood Cemetery in Brooklyn, New York.

== Works ==
Her writings include:

- American Etchers (New York, 1886)
- Henry Hobson Richardson and his Works (1888)
- Mariana Griswold Van Rensselaer (2007). "Mariana Griswold Van Rensselaer's Landscape Gardening Manifesto in Garden and Forest". Landscape Journal. 26 (2): 183. doi:10.3368/lj.26.2.183. S2CID 109901022.
- English Cathedrals (1892; fourth edition, 1892)
- Art out of Doors (1893)
- “The Development of American Homes” article in the book “Household Art” edited by Candace Wheeler (New York, Harper & Brothers, 1893) compiled for the 1893 Chicago Columbian Exposition). Mrs. Van Rensselaer’s article was also printed in The Forum magazine.
- "Fifth Avenue", The Century Magazine (1893) Examined the new development around Central Park.
- Should We Ask for the Suffrage? (1894)
- One Man Who was Content (1896)
- Niagara, a Description (1901)
- History of the City of New York in the Seventeenth Century (1909)
- Poems (1910)
- Wilhelm Reinhold Valentiner, The Art of the Low Countries, translated by Mrs. Schuyler Van Rensselaer (1914)

In the foreword of his 1902 publication New York: Old & New, Rufus Rockwell Wilson acknowledged Van Rensselaer's New York and its Historians series of articles for their "helpful suggestiveness" when it came to writing his book.
