= National Register of Historic Places listings in Rensselaer County, New York =

Municipal breakdown of Rensselaer County

This list is intended to be a complete compilation of properties and districts listed on the National Register of Historic Places in Rensselaer County, New York, United States. Seven of the properties are further designated National Historic Landmarks.

Rensselaer County sits east of the Hudson River in New York's Capital District and borders both Massachusetts and Vermont on the east. The area was originally inhabited by the Mohican Indian tribe until it was bought by the Dutch jeweler and merchant Kiliaen van Rensselaer in 1630 and incorporated into his patroonship Rensselaerswyck (which, in turn, was part of the Dutch colony New Netherland). The area now known as Rensselaer County passed into English hands in 1664, the Dutch regained control of it for a year in 1673, and the English resumed control in 1674. From 1674 until 1776 (the year of American independence), the area was under English or British control.

Rensselaer County came into existence as a governmental entity in 1791, when it was established on lands that were previously part of Albany County. Rensselaer County consists of the cities of Rensselaer and Troy), as well as fourteen towns: Berlin, Brunswick, East Greenbush, Grafton, Hoosick, Nassau, North Greenbush, Petersburgh, Pittstown, Poestenkill, Sand Lake, Schaghticoke, Schodack, and Stephentown. The county also contains six villages: Castleton, East Nassau, Hoosick Falls, Nassau, Schaghticoke, and Valley Falls.

The locations of those National Register properties and districts in Rensselaer County for which latitude and longitude coordinates are listed below may be seen on a map by clicking on the links available within the table above and to the right, which allows readers to map all coordinates using online maps.

This National Park Service list is complete through NPS recent listings posted September 25, 2026.

== Countywide listings ==
Legend: National Register of Historic Places listing National Historic Landmark Historic district National Historic Landmark District

	Name on the Register	Image	Date listed	Location	City or town	Description
1	Adams–Myers–Bryan Farmstead		August 27, 2013 (#13000629)	314 Stover Rd. 42°53′22″N 73°33′48″W	Valley Falls	Farmsteads of Pittstown NY MPS
2	Aiken House	Aiken House	December 31, 1974 (#74001296)	Northeast corner of Riverside and Aiken Aves. 42°38′08″N 73°44′58″W	Rensselaer	
3	Albany Avenue Historic District		November 21, 1978 (#78001902)	Albany Ave. 42°31′01″N 73°36′55″W	Nassau	
4	Auclair–Button Farmstead		June 5, 2013 (#13000360)	80 Auclair Way; 42°48′34″N 73°34′40″W	Melrose	Farmsteads of Pittstown, New York MPS
5	William Barnet & Son Shoddy Mill	William Barnet & Son Shoddy Mill	October 29, 2020 (#100005703)	20 Forbes Ave. 42°39′33″N 73°43′58″W	Rensselaer	
6	Baum–Wallis Farmstead		January 2, 2013 (#12001130)	132 Baum Rd. 42°53′27″N 73°30′21″W	Johnsonville vicinity	Farmsteads of Pittstown, New York MPS
7	Bennington Battlefield	Bennington Battlefield	October 15, 1966 (#66000564)	NY 67, on VT state line 42°56′02″N 73°18′25″W	Walloomsac	Site of key American victory over British during Revolution.
8	Beverwyck Manor	Beverwyck Manor	August 3, 1979 (#79001621)	St. Anthonys Lane. 42°39′48″N 73°43′22″W	Rensselaer	
9	Blink Bonnie	Blink Bonnie	August 10, 2000 (#00000958)	1368 Sunset Rd. 42°34′06″N 73°42′09″W	Schodack	
10	Breese-Reynolds House	Breese-Reynolds House	March 1, 2007 (#07000096)	601 South St. 42°51′29″N 73°19′27″W	Hoosick	Built by Perry Eldridge in 1880.
11	Brownell–Cornell–Gibbs Farmstead		September 19, 2012 (#12000796)	606 Groveside Rd. 42°53′00″N 73°26′28″W	Buskirk vicinity	
12	Burden Iron Works Site	Burden Iron Works Site	November 10, 1977 (#77000977)	Address Restricted	Troy	
13	Burden Ironworks Office Building	Burden Ironworks Office Building	March 16, 1972 (#72000907)	Polk St. 42°42′35″N 73°41′58″W	Troy	
14	Buskirk Covered Bridge	Buskirk Covered Bridge	March 8, 1978 (#78003457)	Spans Hoosic River North of NY 67; 42°57′30″N 73°26′00″W	Buskirk	part of the Covered Bridges of Washington County Thematic Resource (TR)
15	Esek Bussey Firehouse	Esek Bussey Firehouse	July 16, 1973 (#73001252)	302 10th St. 42°44′21″N 73°40′26″W	Troy	
16	Cannon–Brownell–Herrington Farmstead		January 2, 2013 (#12001131)	551 Otter Creek Rd. 42°52′57″N 73°30′11″W	Johnsonville vicinity.	Farmsteads of Pittstown, New York MPS
17	Cannon Building	Cannon Building	March 5, 1970 (#70000427)	1 Broadway; 42°43′53″N 73°41′32″W	Troy	1835 Alexander Jackson Davis-Ithiel Town commercial building further enhanced with mansard roof after 1870s fire.
18	John Carner Jr. House	John Carner Jr. House	January 16, 2004 (#03001399)	1310 Best Rd. 42°37′50″N 73°39′58″W	East Greenbush	
19	Cartin–Snyder–Overacker Farmstead		June 5, 2013 (#13000361)	559 Cushman Rd. 42°50′00″N 73°33′31″W	Melrose	Farmsteads of Pittstown, New York MPS
20	Catholic Central High School	Catholic Central High School	January 19, 2024 (#100009781)	625 7th Avenue; 42°46′30″N 73°40′14″W	Troy	
21	Central Lansingburgh Historic District		February 27, 2023 (#100008651)	1st Ave., 110th and 111th Sts., east alleys of 5th and 6th Aves., 117th and 120th Sts., east and west alleys of 2nd Ave., 42°46′24″N 73°40′34″W	Troy	
22	Central Troy Historic District	Central Troy Historic District	August 13, 1986 (#86001527)	Adams, 1st, 4th, Washington & Hill Sts., Franklin Pl., 5th Ave. 42°43′41″N 73°41′31″W	Troy	96-acre (39 ha) commercial section of downtown Troy with many buildings, including two National Historic Landmarks, from 1787-1940.
23	Chapel and Cultural Center	Chapel and Cultural Center	February 22, 2011 (#11000041)	2125 Burdett Ave. 42°43′55″N 73°40′21″W	Troy	
24	Chatham Street Row	Chatham Street Row	December 1, 1978 (#78001900)	Chatham St. 42°30′53″N 73°36′40″W	Nassau	
25	Church of the Holy Cross	Church of the Holy Cross	June 4, 1973 (#73001253)	136 8th St. 42°43′57″N 73°41′01″W	Troy	Gothic Revival church built in 1844.
26	Church Street Historic District	Church Street Historic District	November 21, 1978 (#78001901)	Church St. 42°30′54″N 73°36′26″W	Nassau	
27	Clark-Dearstyne-Miller Inn	Clark-Dearstyne-Miller Inn	January 9, 2008 (#07001369)	11-13 Forbes Ave. 42°39′32″N 73°44′06″W	Rensselaer	
28	Cluett, Peabody & Co. Factory and Power Boiler House Complex		August 20, 2025 (#100012135)	431-433 River Street; 42°44′14″N 73°41′13″W	Troy	
29	Coletti–Rowland–Agan Farmstead		August 27, 2013 (#13000631)	82 Cooksboro Rd. 42°48′16″N 73°33′50″W	Pittstown	Farmsteads of Pittstown NY MPS
30	Corliss Park Historic District		February 20, 2024 (#100009935)	7th and 8th Avenues, north of Northern Drive; 42°47′15″N 73°39′49″W	Troy	
31	Cornell–Manchester Farmstead		October 3, 2012 (#12000832)	292 Lower Pine Valley Rd. 42°52′38″N 73°26′06″W	Hoosick Falls vicinity	Part of Farmsteads of Pittstown, New York MPS
32	Craver Farmstead	Craver Farmstead	December 16, 1996 (#96001423)	115 Craver Rd. 42°37′23″N 73°38′37″W	East Greenbush	
33	Defreest Homestead	Defreest Homestead	August 2, 1977 (#77000978)	South of Troy at U.S. 4 and Jordan Rd. 42°40′32″N 73°41′39″W	North Greenbush	Early Dutch house built around 1750 and early Dutch barn
34	Delaney Hotel	Delaney Hotel	June 21, 1996 (#96000684)	Junction of NY 22 and NY 67; 42°55′37″N 73°20′38″W	North Hoosick	Intact Greek Revival hotel with vernacular Victorian features built ca. 1850
35	Dickinson Hill Fire Tower	Dickinson Hill Fire Tower	May 6, 2011 (#11000253)	Fire Tower Rd. 42°47′37″N 73°24′49″W	Grafton	
36	District School No. 3	District School No. 3	August 28, 1998 (#98001116)	1125 S. Schodack Rd. 42°30′09″N 73°42′26″W	Castleton-on-Hudson	
37	District #6 Schoolhouse	District #6 Schoolhouse	July 3, 2008 (#08000582)	Brick Church Rd. and Buck Rd. 42°45′04″N 73°34′29″W	Brunswick	One-room schoolhouse built c. 1830 and closed in 1952. Believed to be one of the oldest remaining schoolhouses in Rensselaer County.
38	East Nassau Central School	East Nassau Central School	May 23, 1997 (#97000418)	37 Garfield Rd. 42°30′33″N 73°30′19″W	East Nassau	
39	Elmbrook Farm	Elmbrook Farm	May 21, 2001 (#01000551)	2567 Brookview Rd. 42°34′22″N 73°42′39″W	Schodack	
40	Empire Stove Works	Empire Stove Works	May 10, 2024 (#100010275)	285 Second Street; 42°43′13″N 73°41′38″W	Troy	
41	Estabrook Octagon House	Estabrook Octagon House	February 8, 1980 (#80002755)	8 River St. 42°53′47″N 73°21′11″W	Hoosick Falls	1854 octagon house built closely following specifications of Orson Squire Fowler
42	Thomas S. Fagan & Mary Kate Fagan House		September 27, 2024 (#100009782)	2 Whitman Court; 42°43′03″N 73°40′17″W	Troy	
43	Fifth Avenue-Fulton Street Historic District	Fifth Avenue-Fulton Street Historic District	March 5, 1970 (#70000428)	Bounded by Grand, William, and Union Sts., and Broadway; 42°44′00″N 73°40′59″W	Troy	1860s-era homes of city's business elite. One of five districts consolidated into Central Troy Historic District
44	Fire Alarm, Telegraph and Police Signaling Building	Fire Alarm, Telegraph and Police Signaling Building	January 15, 2003 (#02001714)	67 State St. 42°43′47″N 73°41′12″W	Troy	1922 building consolidated city's public safety communications systems, in wake of history of devastating fires. After a period of vacancy in late 20th century, back in service as police headquarters
45	First Presbyterian Church of Lansingburgh	First Presbyterian Church of Lansingburgh	August 3, 2022 (#100007954)	570 3rd Ave. 42°46′29″N 73°40′34″W	Troy	
46	Fitzgerald Brothers Brewing Company Bottling Works		May 23, 2024 (#100010345)	500 River Street; 42°44′20″N 73°41′10″W	Troy	
47	Fort Crailo	Fort Crailo	October 15, 1966 (#66000563)	South of Columbia St. on Riverside Ave. 42°38′08″N 73°44′59″W	Rensselaer	Only well-preserved Dutch patroon house in upper Hudson Valley
48	Albert R. Fox House	Albert R. Fox House	April 25, 2001 (#01000430)	2801 NY 66; 42°38′04″N 73°32′18″W	Sand Lake	
49	Gardner Earl Memorial Chapel and Crematorium	Gardner Earl Memorial Chapel and Crematorium	February 25, 2004 (#04000091)	50 101st Street; 42°45′20″N 73°40′17″W	Troy	Richardsonian Romanesque memorial chapel in Oakwood Cemetery built by local industrialist for deceased son was highly influential on the design of other such buildings; designated a National Historic Landmark March 2, 2012
50	Garfield School	Garfield School	June 9, 1988 (#88000717)	NY 2 and Moonlawn Rd. 42°43′52″N 73°35′56″W	Brunswick	First building in Brunswick to be added to the NRHP.
51	Glenwood		May 25, 1973 (#73001254)	Eddy's Lane; 42°45′04″N 73°40′33″W	Troy	
52	Gooding Farm		August 5, 2022 (#100007956)	22420 NY 22; 42°55′58″N 73°21′39″W	Eagle Bridge	
53	Grand Street Historic District	Grand Street Historic District	February 27, 1973 (#73001255)	Grand St. between 5th and 6th Aves. 42°43′59″N 73°41′13″W	Troy	Civil War-era rowhouses built in wake of devastating 1862 fire. Now part of Central Troy Historic District.
54	Griswold Heights Historic District		February 20, 2024 (#100009936)	Madison Avenue, Project Street, Project Road, and Campbell Avenue; 42°42′44″N 73°40′35″W	Troy	
55	Halford–Hayner Farmstead		January 2, 2013 (#12001132)	346 Cooksboro Rd. 42°48′30″N 73°35′29″W	Troy vicinity	Farmsteads of Pittstown, New York MPS
56	Harder Manufacturing Company-Albany Woolen Company Inc. Building	Harder Manufacturing Company-Albany Woolen Company Inc. Building	May 20, 2021 (#100006510)	2 Green St. 42°38′11″N 73°44′46″W	Rensselaer	
57	Hart-Cluett Mansion	Hart-Cluett Mansion	April 11, 1973 (#73001256)	59 2nd St. 42°43′46″N 73°41′38″W	Troy	1827 Federal style mansion is one of the best in that style in city. Home to Rensselaer County Historical Society since 1950s
58	Hoosick Falls Armory	Hoosick Falls Armory	March 2, 1995 (#95000086)	Junction of Church and Elm Sts. 42°53′57″N 73°21′15″W	Hoosick Falls	Intact 1889 Isaac Perry-designed armory. Home to units that have fought in the Mexican Border Campaign and Battle of Saipan. Part of the Army National Guard Armories in New York State Multiple Property Submission (MPS)
59	Hoosick Falls Historic District	Hoosick Falls Historic District	December 3, 1980 (#80004280)	Central Ave. and Main St. 42°54′04″N 73°21′06″W	Hoosick Falls	Eight-acre commercial core of village with intact buildings from turn-of-the-century industrial peak
60	Howard–Odmin–Sherman Farmstead		April 7, 2014 (#14000130)	393 Croll Road; 42°51′52″N 73°30′55″W	Pittstown	
61	Ilium Building	Ilium Building	December 18, 1970 (#70000429)	Northeast corner of Fulton and 4th Sts. 42°43′57″N 73°41′20″W	Troy	Intact 1904 Marcus F. Cummings commercial building
62	International Shirt and Collar Company		February 14, 2017 (#100000648)	2 River St. 42°43′26″N 73°41′45″W	Troy	
63	W. P. Irwin Bank Building	W. P. Irwin Bank Building	October 3, 2007 (#07001036)	156 Broadway; 42°38′25″N 73°44′49″W	Rensselaer	
64	Knickerbocker Mansion	Knickerbocker Mansion	December 11, 1972 (#72000906)	Knickerbocker Rd. 42°54′18″N 73°39′08″W	Schaghticoke	
65	Henry Koon House	Henry Koon House	February 21, 1997 (#97000112)	171 Pawling Ave. 42°43′00″N 73°40′13″W	Troy	
66	Lansingburgh Academy	Lansingburgh Academy	October 14, 1976 (#76001267)	27 114th St. 42°46′22″N 73°40′34″W	Troy	
67	Lansingburgh Village Burial Ground	Lansingburgh Village Burial Ground	November 21, 2002 (#02001358)	Third Ave. and 107th St. 42°45′52″N 73°40′48″W	Troy	
68	Lion Factory	Lion Factory	April 28, 2022 (#100007669)	750 2nd Ave. 42°46′54″N 73°40′26″W	Troy	
69	Marsh–Link–Pollock Farm		December 22, 2014 (#14001072)	66 White Church Lane; 42°44′16″N 73°33′14″W	Brunswick	Well-preserved 1840s farmstead
70	David Mathews House	David Mathews House	September 10, 1979 (#79000274)	VT 67; 42°56′27″N 73°16′28″W	Hoosick	
71	McCarthy Building	McCarthy Building	March 5, 1970 (#70000430)	255-257 River St. 42°43′56″N 73°41′30″W	Troy	Downtown Troy landmark built in 1904 and largely intact
72	Mechanicville Hydroelectric Plant	Mechanicville Hydroelectric Plant	November 13, 1989 (#89001942)	At NY 32 on Hudson River; 42°52′41″N 73°40′47″W	Mechanicville	
73	Herman Melville House	Herman Melville House	August 21, 1992 (#92001081)	2 114th St. 42°46′23″N 73°40′45″W	Troy	
74	Methodist Episcopal Church of Lansingburgh		June 23, 2016 (#16000412)	600 3rd Ave. 42°46′32″N 73°40′30″W	Troy	Center of village now part of Troy was built in 1849, expanded in 1875 and rebuilt in 1903
75	Miller, Hall & Hartwell Shirt Collar Factory		May 10, 2024 (#100010268)	547 and 558 River Street; 42°44′26″N 73°41′09″W	Troy	
76	Muitzes Kill Historic District	Muitzes Kill Historic District	July 24, 1974 (#74001297)	An irregular pattern on both sides of Schodack Landing Rd. 42°28′35″N 73°43′22″W	Schodack	
77	Kate Mullany House	Kate Mullany House	April 1, 1998 (#98000453)	350 8th St. 42°44′24″N 73°40′54″W	Troy	Apartment building of teenaged Irish immigrant who organized her fellow garment workers and went on to become first major female U.S. labor leader
78	National State Bank Building	National State Bank Building	December 29, 1970 (#70000431)	297 River St. 42°43′57″N 73°41′27″W	Troy	1904 Marcus F. Cummings building shows influence of early skyscrapers; has been Monument Square landmark since its construction.
79	Neemes Foundry	Neemes Foundry	August 12, 2024 (#100010631)	206 First Street; 42°43′22″N 73°41′41″W	Troy	
80	Newton–Taber–Martin Farm	Newton–Taber–Martin Farm	November 2, 2016 (#16000752)	149 Clarks Chapel Rd. 42°34′47″N 73°34′40″W	Nassau	Continuously operated farm dates to 1788, when it was established by a Revolutionary War veteran from Massachusetts
81	New York State Barge Canal	New York State Barge Canal	October 15, 2014 (#14000860)	Hudson River; 42°47′18″N 73°40′21″W	Troy and Schaghticoke	Successor to Erie Canal approved by state voters in early 20th century to compete with railroads.
82	Northern River Street Historic District	Northern River Street Historic District	May 19, 1988 (#88000630)	403-429 and 420-430 River St. 42°44′08″N 73°41′17″W	Troy	Transitional neighborhood between downtown and industrial areas in late 19th century; largely unchanged since then
83	Oakwood Avenue Presbyterian Church	Oakwood Avenue Presbyterian Church	November 21, 2012 (#12000959)	313 10th St. 42°44′24″N 73°40′47″W	Troy	
84	Oakwood Cemetery	Oakwood Cemetery	October 4, 1984 (#84000021)	50 101st St. 42°45′44″N 73°40′12″W	Troy	Burial site of "Uncle Sam" Wilson and Civil War Gen. George H. Thomas
85	Old Troy Hospital	Old Troy Hospital	October 25, 1973 (#73001257)	8th St. 42°43′54″N 73°41′00″W	Troy	Also known as West Hall. French Second Empire structure home to Arts Department at RPI
86	J. C. Osgood Firehouse	J. C. Osgood Firehouse	November 2, 2000 (#00001231)	316-324 Third St. 42°43′10″N 73°41′35″W	Troy	
87	Jacob H. Patten House	Jacob H. Patten House	January 5, 2016 (#15000954)	254 4th Ave. 42°45′44″N 73°40′56″W	Troy	1882 brick Italianate townhouse and carriage house built for successful local blacksmith
88	Patroon Agent's House and Office	Patroon Agent's House and Office	August 3, 1979 (#79001622)	15 Forbes Ave. 42°39′26″N 73°44′07″W	Rensselaer	
89	Petersburgh United Methodist Church	Petersburgh United Methodist Church	January 2, 2004 (#03001354)	12 Head of Lane Rd. 42°45′08″N 73°20′44″W	Petersburgh	
90	Poesten Kill Gorge Historic District		March 8, 1978 (#78001903)	Address Restricted	Troy	Try also Poestenkill Gorge Historic District
91	Powers Home		April 16, 1974 (#74001298)	819 3rd Ave. 42°47′02″N 73°40′22″W	Troy	
92	Proctor's Theater	Proctor's Theater	October 4, 1979 (#79001623)	82 4th St. 42°43′55″N 73°41′25″W	Troy	1914 theater shows transition between eras of live entertainment and motion picture. Part of the Movie Palaces of the Tri-Cities TR
93	Public School No.1	Public School No.1	December 7, 2018 (#100003232)	2920 Fifth Avenue; 42°44′49″N 73°40′56″W	Troy	1910 brick school built to serve newly annexed Lansingburgh neighborhood was used by district until 2013
94	Public School No. 10	Public School No. 10	November 4, 1994 (#94001281)	77 Adams St. 42°43′22″N 73°41′34″W	Troy	
95	Pumpkin House	Pumpkin House	June 8, 1998 (#98000573)	180 Fourth St. 42°43′35″N 73°41′26″W	Troy	
96	Rensselaer Society of Engineers House	Rensselaer Society of Engineers House	April 5, 2019 (#100003629)	1501 Sage Avenue; 42°43′47″N 73°40′31″W	Troy	Large 1924 Colonial Revival brick building home to Rensselaer Society of Engineers
97	River Street Historic District	River Street Historic District	June 3, 1976 (#76001268)	Both sides of River St. from Congress St. to junction with 1st St. 42°43′49″N 73°41′42″W	Troy	Oldest downtown neighborhood in city, largely rebuilt after 1820 fire. Now part of Central Troy Historic District.
98	Sand Lake Baptist Church	Sand Lake Baptist Church	January 2, 2004 (#03001353)	2960 NY 43; 42°38′07″N 73°32′59″W	Averill Park	
99	Schodack Landing Historic District	Schodack Landing Historic District	September 15, 1977 (#77000976)	NY 9J; 42°28′58″N 73°46′07″W	Schodack Landing	
100	Searle, Gardner and Company Cuff and Collar Factory		January 15, 2014 (#13001092)	701–715 River St. 42°44′48″N 73°41′09″W	Troy	Old textile plant
101	Second Street Historic District	Second Street Historic District	August 7, 1974 (#74001299)	Both sides of 2nd St. 42°43′53″N 73°41′40″W	Troy	Troy's first desirable residential neighborhood. Many houses from 1820s-1840s. Merged into Central Troy Historic District in 1986.
102	Sharpe Homestead and Cemetery	Sharpe Homestead and Cemetery	May 19, 2005 (#05000440)	44 Laura Ln. 42°39′40″N 73°41′57″W	Defreestville	
103	Sherman Farm		July 5, 2003 (#03000597)	35 Sherman Rd. 42°51′23″N 73°30′37″W	Pittstown	
104	Henry Tunis Smith Farm		September 18, 1975 (#75001222)	South of Nassau on NY 203; 42°29′37″N 73°37′10″W	Nassau	
105	St. Barnabas Episcopal Church		January 28, 2004 (#03001517)	2900 Fifth Ave. 42°44′46″N 73°40′58″W	Troy	
106	St. Mark's Episcopal Church	St. Mark's Episcopal Church	July 27, 2000 (#00000836)	Main St. 42°53′59″N 73°21′02″W	Hoosick Falls	1858 Henry Dudley church done in brick rather than his usual stone
107	St. Paul's Episcopal Church Complex	St. Paul's Episcopal Church Complex	September 7, 1979 (#79001624)	58 3rd St. 42°43′49″N 73°41′24″W	Troy	1828 church is early Gothic Revival imitation of Ithiel Town's Trinity Church in New Haven, Connecticut
108	Joachim Staats House and Gerrit Staats Ruin		December 15, 1978 (#78001898)	North of Castleton-on-Hudson; 42°34′15″N 73°44′58″W	Castleton-on-Hudson	
109	Theta Xi Fraternity Chapter House	Theta Xi Fraternity Chapter House	December 11, 2013 (#13000911)	1490 Sage Ave. 42°43′50″N 73°40′38″W	Troy	Well-preserved 1931 Tudor Revival fraternity house
110	Thomas–Wiley–Johnson Farmstead		September 19, 2012 (#12000798)	703 Johnsonville Rd. 42°52′19″N 73°29′51″W	Johnsonville vicinity	
111	Tibbits House	Tibbits House	May 22, 1978 (#78001899)	South of Hoosick at junction of NY 22 and NY 7; 42°51′28″N 73°20′37″W	Hoosick	
112	Tomhannock Methodist Episcopal Church	Tomhannock Methodist Episcopal Church	May 27, 2014 (#14000262)	Tomhannock Rd. 42°52′10″N 73°32′53″W	Pittstown	
113	Trinity Church Lansingburgh	Trinity Church Lansingburgh	May 1, 1995 (#95000478)	585 Fourth Ave. 42°46′28″N 73°40′32″W	Troy	
114	Troy Gas Light Company	Troy Gas Light Company	February 18, 1971 (#71000556)	Northwest corner of Jefferson St. and 5th Ave. 42°43′17″N 73°41′26″W	Troy	Structure used to hold coal gas in the 1800s.
115	Troy Public Library	Troy Public Library	January 17, 1973 (#73001258)	100 2nd St. 42°44′46″N 73°40′59″W	Troy	
116	Troy Savings Bank and Music Hall	Troy Savings Bank and Music Hall	April 11, 1989 (#89001066)	32 Second St. 42°43′49″N 73°41′31″W	Troy	Late 19th-century bank building with full theater, including pipe organ, upstairs
117	Troy Waste Manufacturing Company Building		February 14, 2014 (#14000008)	444 River St. 42°44′11″N 73°41′21″W	Troy	Textile Factory Buildings in Troy, New York, 1880-1920 MPS
118	US Post Office-Hoosick Falls	US Post Office-Hoosick Falls	November 17, 1988 (#88002506)	35 Main St. 42°54′02″N 73°21′05″W	Hoosick Falls	1925 brick Colonial Revival building mostly intact; part of the US Post Offices in New York State, 1858-1943, TR
119	US Post Office-Troy	US Post Office-Troy	May 11, 1989 (#88002438)	400 Broadway; 42°43′53″N 73°41′21″W	Troy	Stripped Classical Revival-style building from 1936, excellent example of that sort of architecture in larger city post offices during Depression. One of only three in the U.S. with interior mural by Waldo Peirce. Part of the US Post Offices in New York State, 1858-1943, TR
120	United Waste Manufacturing Company Building	United Waste Manufacturing Company Building	March 6, 2013 (#13000054)	1 Jackson St. 42°42′57″N 73°41′46″W	Troy	Castellated Romanesque factory building on the Hudson River dating to 1902
121	John Evert Van Alen House	John Evert Van Alen House	August 20, 2004 (#04000873)	1744 Washington Ave. Ext. 42°39′11″N 73°41′56″W	Defreestville	
122	Van Rensselaer High School	Van Rensselaer High School	August 14, 2012 (#12000511)	199 Washington Ave. 42°39′32″N 73°43′37″W	Rensselaer	
123	Valley Falls Historic District	Valley Falls Historic District	November 9, 2018 (#100003118)	State, Burton, Charles & Edward Sts. 42°53′57″N 73°33′41″W	Valley Falls	Properties in core of industrial village date to 1830s
124	Van Zandt, Jacobs and Company Collar and Cuff Factory	Van Zandt, Jacobs and Company Collar and Cuff Factory	February 14, 2014 (#14000009)	621 River St. 42°44′35″N 73°41′15″W	Troy	Textile Factory Buildings in Troy, New York, 1880-1920 MPS
125	W. & L. E. Gurley Building	W. & L. E. Gurley Building	March 5, 1970 (#70000432)	514 Fulton St. 42°43′57″N 73°41′18″W	Troy	Exemplary Neoclassical commercial building preserved nearly intact; built in only eight months on site of 1845 original after 1862 fire. Home of Gurley Precision Instruments for over 150 years.
126	Washington Park Historic District	Washington Park Historic District	May 25, 1973 (#73001259)	Washington Park and adjacent properties on 2nd, 3rd, and Washington Sts. and Washington Pl. 42°43′26″N 73°41′35″W	Troy	Rows of townhouses built by local businessmen in 1839 on the model of British residential squares in Bloomsbury. Residents are still assessed for the maintenance of the park. Now part of Central Troy Historic District.
127	Whalen Bottling Plant	Whalen Bottling Plant	May 26, 2026 (#100013038)	106-108 Jefferson St, 350 William St, 1049 5th Ave; 42°43′16″N 73°41′26″W	Troy	
128	Wilbur–Campbell–Stephens Company Cuff and Collar Factory		February 2, 2016 (#15001026)	599 River Street; 42°44′32″N 73°41′17″W	Troy	1899 factory building is one of five on the street.
129	Emma Willard School	Emma Willard School	August 30, 1979 (#79001625)	Pawling and Elmgrove Aves. 42°42′48″N 73°39′44″W	Troy	
130	William Connors Paint Manufacturing Company Building		July 28, 2016 (#16000486)	669 River St. 42°44′42″N 73°41′05″W	Troy	1880s structure home to one of the first companies to make ready-mixed paint widely available in sealed cans.
131	Winslow Chemical Laboratory	Winslow Chemical Laboratory	November 4, 1994 (#94001284)	105 Eighth St. 42°43′52″N 73°41′05″W	Troy	1866 structure on RPI campus.

== Former listings ==
	Name on the Register	Image	Date listed	Date removed	Location	City or town	Description
1	Haskell School	Haskell School	September 19, 2003 (#03000244)	November 15, 2023	150 Sixth Ave. 42°45′28″N 73°40′42″W	Troy	

== See also ==
- National Register of Historic Places listings in New York
- List of New York State Historic Markers in Rensselaer County, New York
