= St. Barnabas Episcopal Church =

St. Barnabas Episcopal Church may refer to:

in the United States

- St. Barnabas Episcopal Church (Foreman, Arkansas)
- St. Barnabas Episcopal Church (Montrose, Iowa)
- St. Barnabas' Episcopal Church (Newark, New Jersey)
- St. Barnabas Episcopal Church (Troy, New York)
- Church of St. Barnabas (Irvington, New York)
- St. Barnabas Episcopal Church (Snow Hill, North Carolina)
