= Valley Falls, New York =

- Village
- Location in Rensselaer County and the state of New York.

- Location within the state of New York
- Coordinates: 42°54′3″N 73°33′45″W
- Country: United States
- State: New York
- County: Rensselaer
- Valley Falls: 1904

Area
  - Total: 0.49 sq mi (1.27 km^{2})
  - Land: 0.46 sq mi (1.20 km^{2})
  - Water: 0.023 sq mi (0.06 km^{2})
- Elevation: 335 ft (102 m)

Population (2020)
  - Total: 510
  - Density: 1,100.5/sq mi (424.89/km^{2})
- Time zone: UTC-5 (Eastern (EST))
  - Summer (DST): UTC-4 (EDT)
- ZIP code: 12185
- Area code: 518
- FIPS code: 36-76672
- GNIS feature ID: 0968358

Valley Falls is a village in Rensselaer County, New York, United States. As of the 2020 census, Valley Falls had a population of 510. The village lies on the boundary of the towns of Pittstown and Schaghticoke, but is mostly in the northwestern part of Pittstown.

== History ==
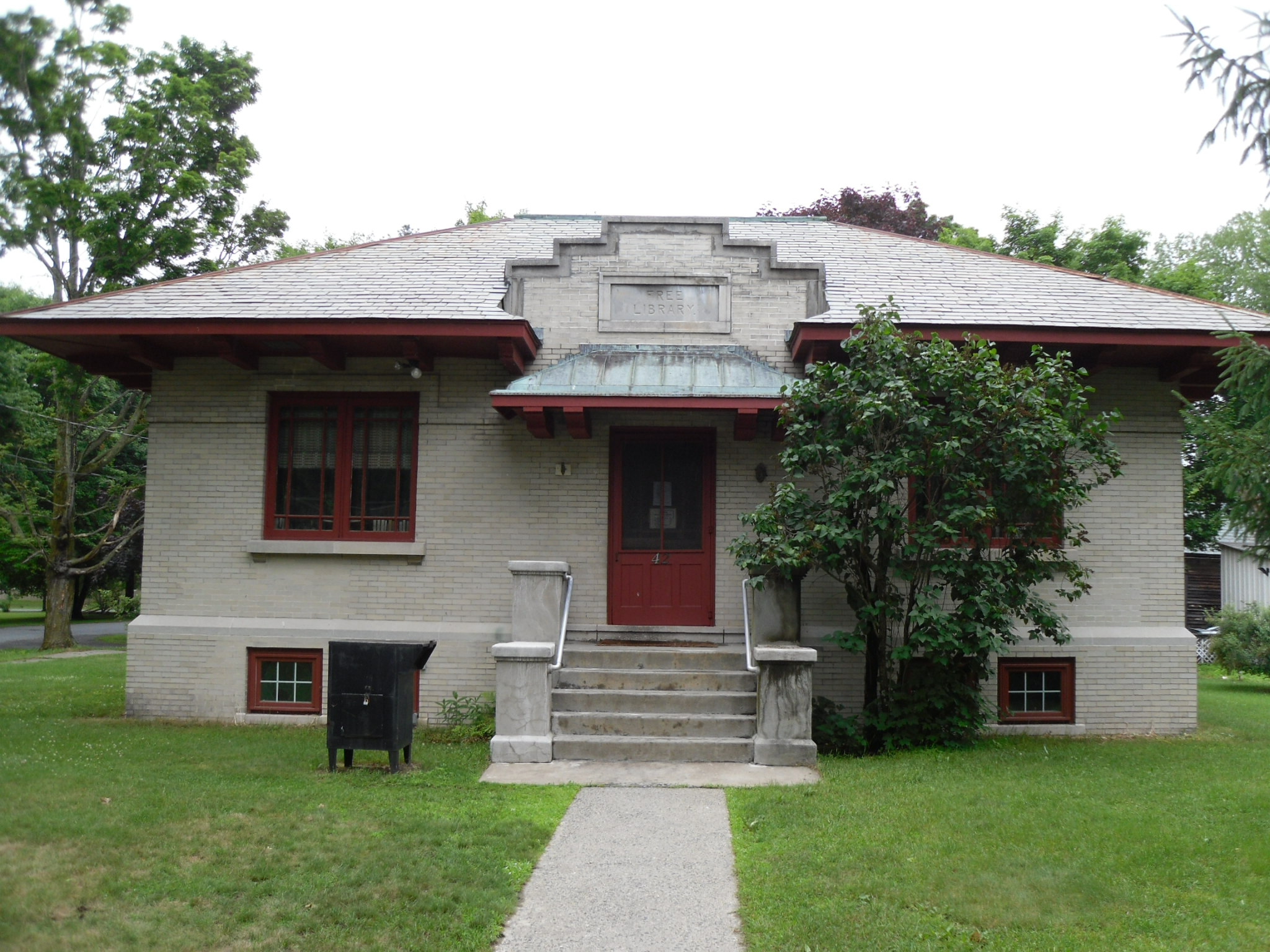
Valley Falls free library.

In 1871, industrialist James Thompson built a textile mill in the village. Nearly all village residents worked in the mill and schoolchildren ran home when the mill's lunch whistle sounded. After its height of operation in the 1970s, it entered a decade of decline. The mill had been vacant for at least 10 years when it went up in flames in the early morning hours on April 22, 2009.

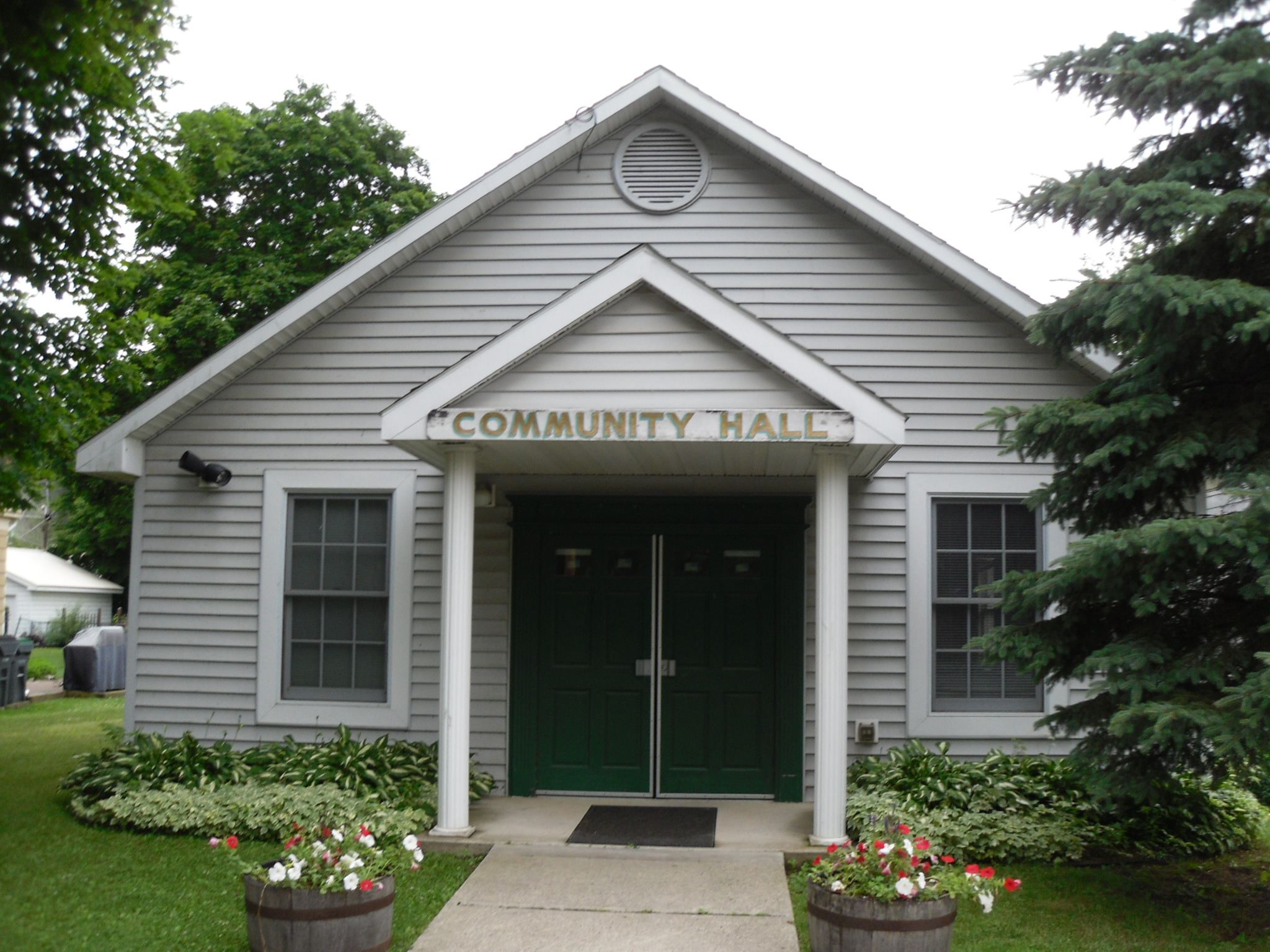
Community Hall in Valley Falls.

By 1863, Valley Falls had established itself as a mini-industrial center. In addition to the aforementioned Thompson textile mill, the village also had a blacksmith shop, farrier shop, foundry, wainwright shop, cooperage, vineyard, three general stores, and two hotels. At this time only a single rail line (Troy & Boston RR) from Troy passed through the southern limit of the village, heading to Johnsonville. Later, a second rail line from Schaghticoke would follow the Hoosic River past Thompson's Mill, also heading to Johnsonville. By the early 1970s, the southern rail line was completely abandoned and had been largely dismantled; the northern line still functions to this day. However, with the closing of the Thompson mill, the train no longer stops in Valley Falls.

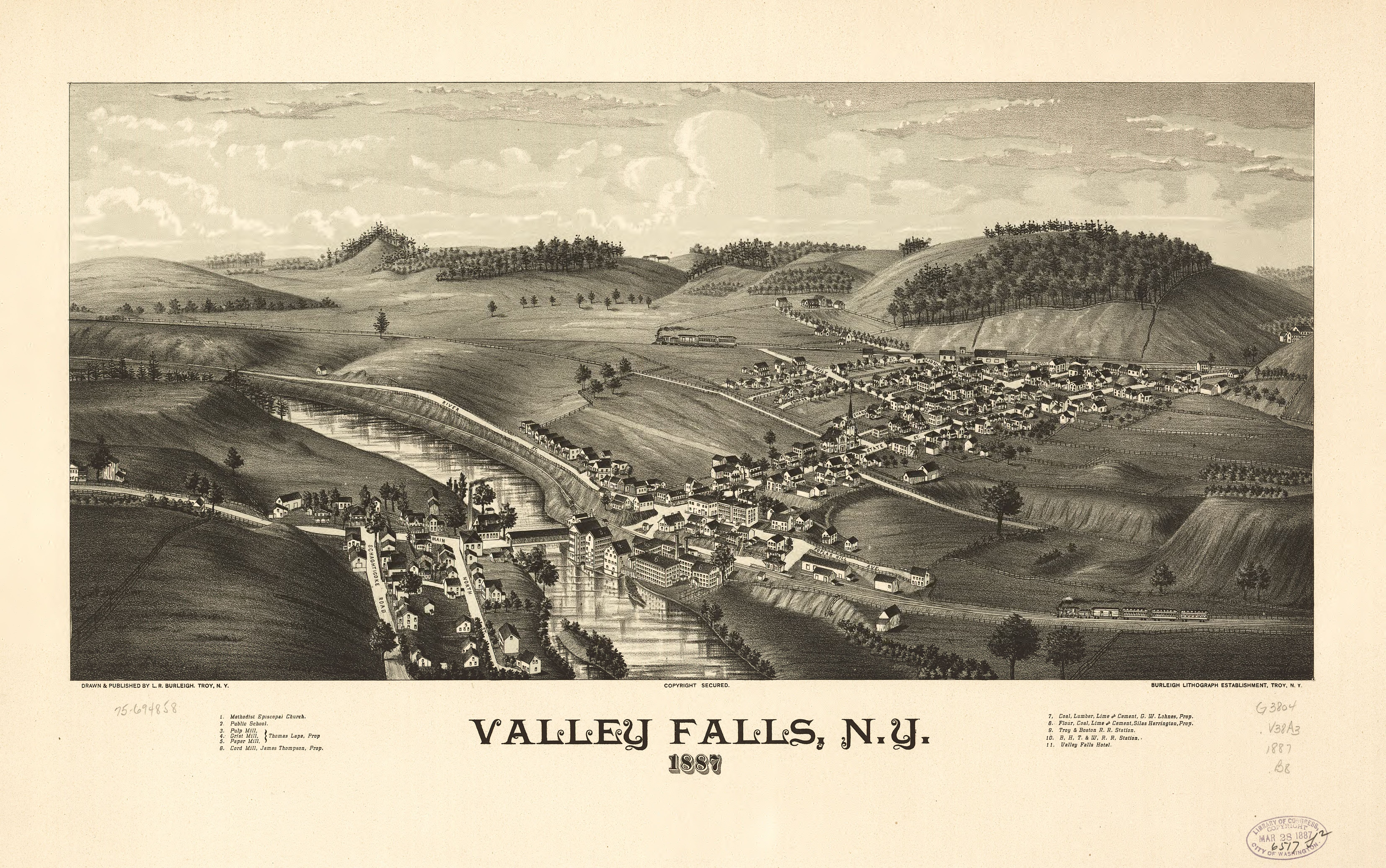
Perspective map of Valley Falls from 1887 by L.R. Burleigh including a list of landmarks

Valley Falls in the hometown of Allan C. Balch, public utilities executive and namesake for Cornell's Balch Hall.

The Adams–Myers–Bryan Farmstead was listed on the National Register of Historic Places in 2013.

== Geography ==
Valley Falls is located at 42°54′3″N 73°33′45″W (42.900846, -73.562495).

The Hoosic River unequally divides the village. The majority of the village is on the southern side of the Hoosic in the township of Pittstown and the "Village Annex" on the northern side is in the township of Schaghticoke.

According to the United States Census Bureau, the village has a total area of 0.5 square miles (1.3 km^{2}), of which 0.4 square miles (1.0 km^{2}) is land and 0.04 square miles (0.10 km^{2}) (4.35%) is water.

== Demographics ==
Historical population
Census	Pop.	Note	%±
1870	600		—
1880	782		30.3%
1910	835		—
1920	633		−24.2%
1930	577		−8.8%
1940	564		−2.3%
1950	555		−1.6%
1960	589		6.1%
1970	681		15.6%
1980	554		−18.6%
1990	527		−4.9%
2000	491		−6.8%
2010	466		−5.1%
2020	510		9.4%
U.S. Decennial Census

As of the census of 2000, there were 491 people, 179 households, and 132 families residing in the village. The population density was 1,119.6 inhabitants per square mile (432.3/km^{2}). There were 191 housing units at an average density of 435.5 per square mile (168.1/km^{2}). The racial makeup of the village was 97.35% White, 1.43% Native American, 0.81% Asian, and 0.41% from two or more races. Hispanic or Latino of any race were 0.61% of the population.

There were 179 households, out of which 42.5% had children under the age of 18 living with them, 55.9% were married couples living together, 15.6% had a female householder with no husband present, and 25.7% were non-families. 19.6% of all households were made up of individuals, and 9.5% had someone living alone who was 65 years of age or older. The average household size was 2.74 and the average family size was 3.20.

In the village, the population was spread out, with 30.8% under the age of 18, 5.7% from 18 to 24, 32.8% from 25 to 44, 20.0% from 45 to 64, and 10.8% who were 65 years of age or older. The median age was 35 years. For every 100 females, there were 91.1 males. For every 100 females age 18 and over, there were 92.1 males.

The median income for a household in the village was $56,250, and the median income for a family was $59,583. Males had a median income of $34,808 versus $28,750 for females. The per capita income for the village was $20,989. About 7.2% of families and 4.4% of the population were below the poverty line, including 7.4% of those under age 18 and none of those age 65 or over.
