= Jacob H. Patten House =

Historic house in New York, United States

- U.S. National Register of Historic Places
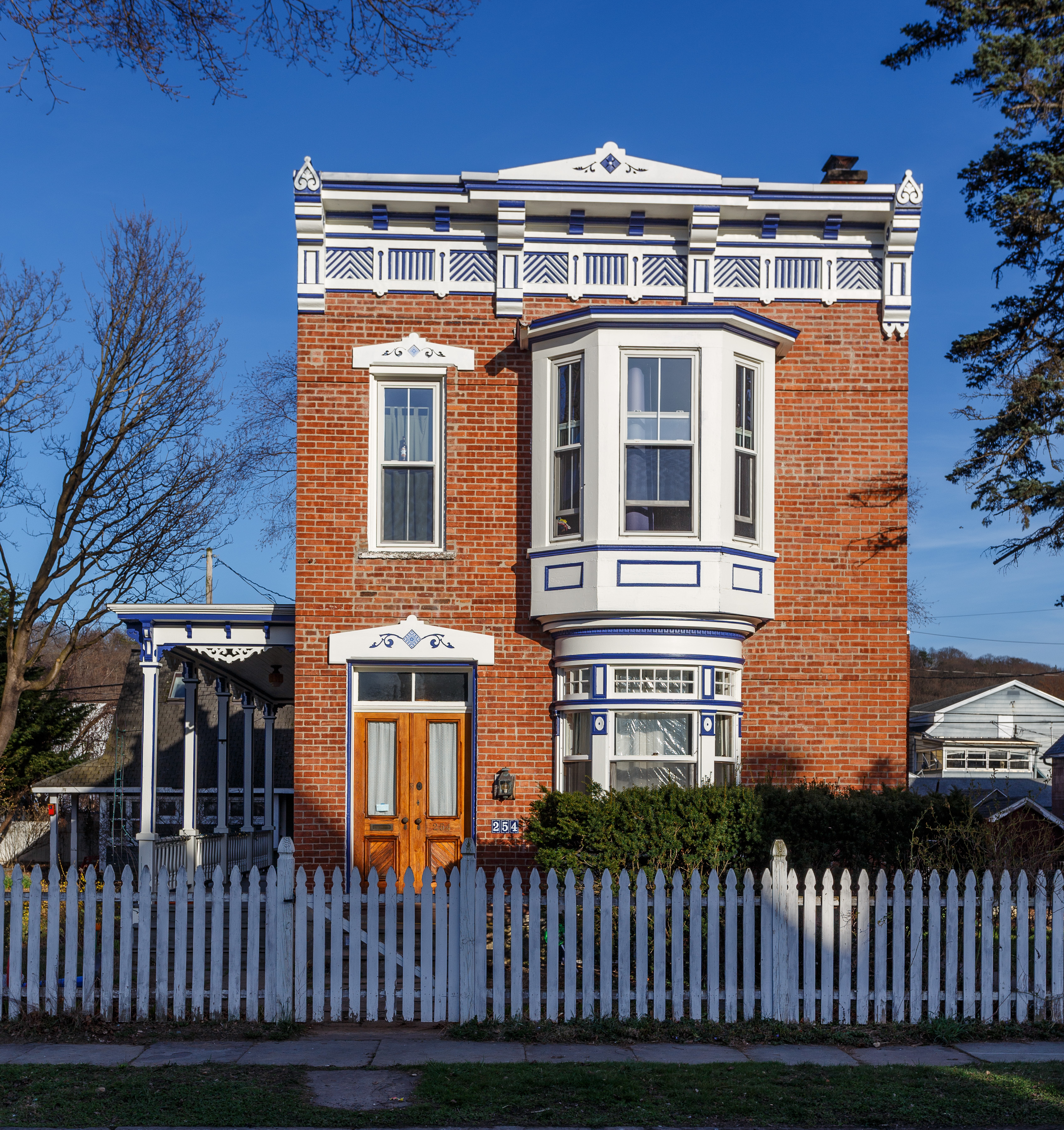

- Location within New York Location within the United States
- Location: 254 4th Avenue, Troy, New York
- Coordinates: 42°45′44″N 73°40′56″W
- Area: 0.27 acres (0.11 ha)
- Built: 1881-1882
- Architectural style: Italianate
- NRHP reference No.: 15000954
- Added to NRHP: January 5, 2016

Jacob H. Patten House is a historic home located in the former village of Lansingburgh at Troy, Rensselaer County, New York. It was built in 1881–1882, and is a two-story, two-bay-wide by three-bay-deep, Italianate style brick dwelling. It sits on a brick and stone foundation and a pitched roof hidden by a low parapet. The front facade features a one-story, shallow, hipped roof porch with square, chamfered columns and brackets. Also on the property is a contributing two-story carriage house (c. 1881–1882).

It was listed on the National Register of Historic Places in 2016.

== See also ==
- National Register of Historic Places listings in Rensselaer County, New York
