= List of New York State Historic Markers in Rensselaer County, New York =

This is an incomplete list of New York State Historic Markers in Rensselaer County, New York.

== Listings county-wide ==
	Marker name	Image	Date designated	Location	City or Town	Coords	Marker text
1	Home of Philip D. Dater		2007	Brunswick Road (New York State Route 2) in Eagle Mills	Brunswick	42°43′45.29″N 73°36′2.61″W	1798: Home Of Philip D. Dater. Born 1790-Died 1868. Served in War of 1812
2	Garfield School			Garfield Road near Brunswick Road (New York State Route 2)	Brunswick	42°43′43.27″N 73°35′59.74″W	1-Room c. 1840–81. Named for James A. Garfield who taught here 1854-56 while a student at Williams College
3	District No. 6		2009	Corner of Buck Road and Brick Church Road (New York State Route 278)	Brunswick	42°45′4.4″N 73°34′27.67″W	C. 1830 brick school built on land granted by Luther and Olive Eddy. Later named the Lincoln School by students.
4	Gilead Lutheran Church		1947	New York State Route 7 at Haynersville	Brunswick	42°47′27.78″N 73°34′13.47″W	Gilead Church; Lutheran, organized about 1746 by Palatine settlers 400 feet east of this spot. Moved 2 1/2 miles south to present site in 1817.
4	District 7 School			Gypsy Lane of New York State Route 142 near Lansingburgh	Brunswick	42°46′43.41″N 73°38′43.27″W	Dist. 7 School; On Gypsy Lane c. 1829–30; 'Schoolhouse in the woods'; Herman Melville taught 1840; Land given 1829 by Abraham Jacob Lansing.
5	Citizen Genet			On Us 9 & 20 In Front Of Dutch Reformed Church, E. Greenbush	East Greenbush		1763–1834 Settled Two Miles West Of Here About 1800 Grave Behind This Church
6	War of 1812			On Us 9 & 20 Columbia Trnpke. At Hampton Manor	East Greenbush		Greenbush Cantonment Quarters For United States Army Situated On Half Mile North Of Here [Arrow]
7	Arrow (Fort Crailo)			Intersection Us 9 & 20 With Nys 4 & 40	East Greenbush		4 Miles Fort Crailo "Yankee Doodle" Written There 1758
8	Arrow (Fort Crailo)			Intersection Us 9 & 20 With Nys 9J	East Greenbush		2500 Feet Fort Crailo "Yankee Doodle" Written There 1758
9	Bennington Battlefield		1929	New York State Route 67 at entrance to Bennington Battlefield Park, east of Walloomsac	Hoosick	42°56′1.98″N 73°18′17.24″W	Bennington Battlefield; General Stark's Victory; August 16, 1777
10	Early Tavern			On Nys 7 At Hoosick	Hoosick		Kept By David Wilcox Before 1814. Later Home Of Dr. John Warren. Born 1806, Died 1882 First Regular Pastor 1797
11	First Meeting House		1936	East side of Main Street between Elm and Hall Streets in Hoosick Falls	Hoosick	42°53′56.32″N 73°21′1.31″W	First Meeting House in Hoosick Falls erected 1800 for use of the "Warren Society of Hoosick"; Baptist church organized 1847.
12	Reformed Protestant Dutch Church at Tiossiook		1936	Southeast corner of New York State Route 67 and Buskirk-West Hoosick Road	Hoosick	42°57′12.49″N 73°26′0.09″W	Dutch Church at Tiossiook; Organized May 2, 1792; Present building erected 1823; First pastor Rev. S. Smith
13	Walloomsac N. E. Church			On Town Rd. About 1 Mile East Of Walloomsac	Hoosick		Walloomsac N. E. Church Incorporated April 18, 1811 Reincorporated 1845 And 1858 On Pittstown Circuit Church Building Removed 1898
14	First Bridge Over Hoosick River in Hoosick Falls			On Mechanic St., Hoosick Falls	Hoosick		First Bridge Over Hoosick River At The Falls, Built 1791 As "Federal Bridge". Builders John Waldo And John Ryan Rebuilt By J. Manchester, 1825
15	Hoosick Baptist Church			On Nys 7 About 1 1/2 Miles Northeast Of Hoosick	Hoosick		Hoosick Baptist Church Organized March 16, 1785 First Building Erected 1792 Elder Samuel Rogers First Regular Pastor 1797
16	St. Croix Church			On Nys 67 About 1/2 Mile West Of North Hoosick	Hoosick	42°55′54.98″N 73°21′31.15″W	Near here is site Dutch Reform Church the first Protestant Church in Hoosick Valley on lot of A. Wendell in Hoosac Pat.
17	Arrow (Bennington Battlefield)			On Nys 67 About 1 Mile East Of Walloomsac	Hoosick		Bennington Battlefield August 16, 1777 Road Leading To Site Of Battle And Baum's Redoubt
18	Arrow (Bennington Battlefield)			On Nys 67 About 1 Mile East Of Walloomsac	Hoosick		Battery Point Here, August 16, 1777, A Cannon, Guarding Bridge And Ford, Was Captured By The Americans. Now In The Bennington Hist. Museum
19	Benjamin Budd's Tavern			On Us 20 At Brainerd	Nassau		Built By Hershon Turner On Site Of Kaunaumeek Where Brainerd Preached To Indians With Aid Of Wauwaumpequunnaunt
20	Van Alen Home			On Washington Avenue near New York State Route 43 in Defreestville	North Greenbush	42°39′14.44″N 73°41′52.55″W	Built On 400 Acres Tract Purchased 1778 By John Evert Van Alen Born 1749 - Died 1807 Congressman 1793–1799
21	Arrow (Fort Crailo)			On Nys 40 At Defreestville	North Greenbush		5 Miles Fort Crailo "Yankee Doodle" Written There 1758
22	Brimmer Farm			On Co. Rd. About 1/2 Mile South Of Petersburg Junction	Petersburg		Settled 1754 Indian Massacre Occurred Here June 2, 1755 George Brimmer Buried Here
23	Farm of John Brimmer			On Nys 22 About 1 1/2 Miles South Of Petersburg	Petersburg		John Brimmer Who Was Captured By Indians, 1754 Buried Here In 1830
24	Coon Inn			On Nys 22 About 1 Mile South Of Petersburg	Petersburg		Coon Inn First Town Meeting Held Here April 5, 1791. H. Coon, Moderator; J. Odell, Supervisor; J. Greene, Clerk
25	Lydia Odell Baxter			On Tn. Rd. About 1 1/2 Miles East Of Petersburg	Petersburg		Poet Born Here September 2, 1809 - Died New York City, January 23, 1874
26	Reynolds Farm			On Nys 22 About 3 Miles South Of North Petersburg	Petersburg		Settled 1780 William W. Reynolds Born In Rhode Island Died Here 1829. Served In American Revolution
27	Garfield Church			On Town Road To Poestenkill	Poestenkill		President James A. Garfield Preached Here And Conducted His Writing School Earning Tuition To Williams College
28	Arrow (Fort Crailo)			At Columbia St. & Broadway	Rensselaer		1200 Feet Fort Crailo "Yankee Doodle" Written There 1758
29	Arrow (Fort Crailo)			On Broadway At Dunn Memorial Bridge	Rensselaer		2000 Feet Fort Crailo "Yankee Doodle" Written There 1758
30	Arrow (Fort Crailo)			At Dunn Memorial Bridge	Rensselaer		2000 Feet Fort Crailo "Yankee Doodle" Written There 1758
31	Arrow (Fort Crailo)			On Riverside Ave. Opposite Fort Crailo	Rensselaer		Fort Crailo "Yankee Doodle" Written Here 1758
32	Arrow (Fort Crailo)			At Aiken Ave. & Columbia St.	Rensselaer		1200 Feet Fort Crailo "Yankee Doodle" Written There 1758
33	Herman Melville's Home			In Front Of No. 2 114Th St. In North Troy	Troy		Author Of "Moby Dick" Family Home 1838–1847 Did His Earliest Writing And Completed First Two Books Here; "Typee" And "Omoo"
34	First House of Worship in Troy			On The Corner Of Congress & 1St Sts. In Troy	Troy		The First House Of Worship In Troy Was Erected - 1792 By The First Presbyterian Church Present Church Built 1836
35	Albert Pawling			Old Mount Ida Cemetery on Pawling Avenue, near New York State Route 2	Troy	42°43′17.55″N 73°40′26.81″W	Albert Pawling; 2nd Lt. 1775. Led forces at Quebec, St. John's, White Plains and Monmouth. 1st sheriff Rensselaer County; 1st mayor City of Troy, NY
36	Old Mount Ida Cemetery			Pawling Avenue near New York State Route 2	Troy	42°43′17.15″N 73°40′30.54″W	Old Mount Ida; Cemetery est. 01 Jan 1832; 12-3/10 acres. Numerous soldiers buried here who served in the Revolutionary War, 1812 and Civil Wars

== See also ==
- List of New York State Historic Markers
- National Register of Historic Places listings in Rensselaer County, New York
- List of National Historic Landmarks in New York
