= Delaney Hotel =

- U.S. National Register of Historic Places
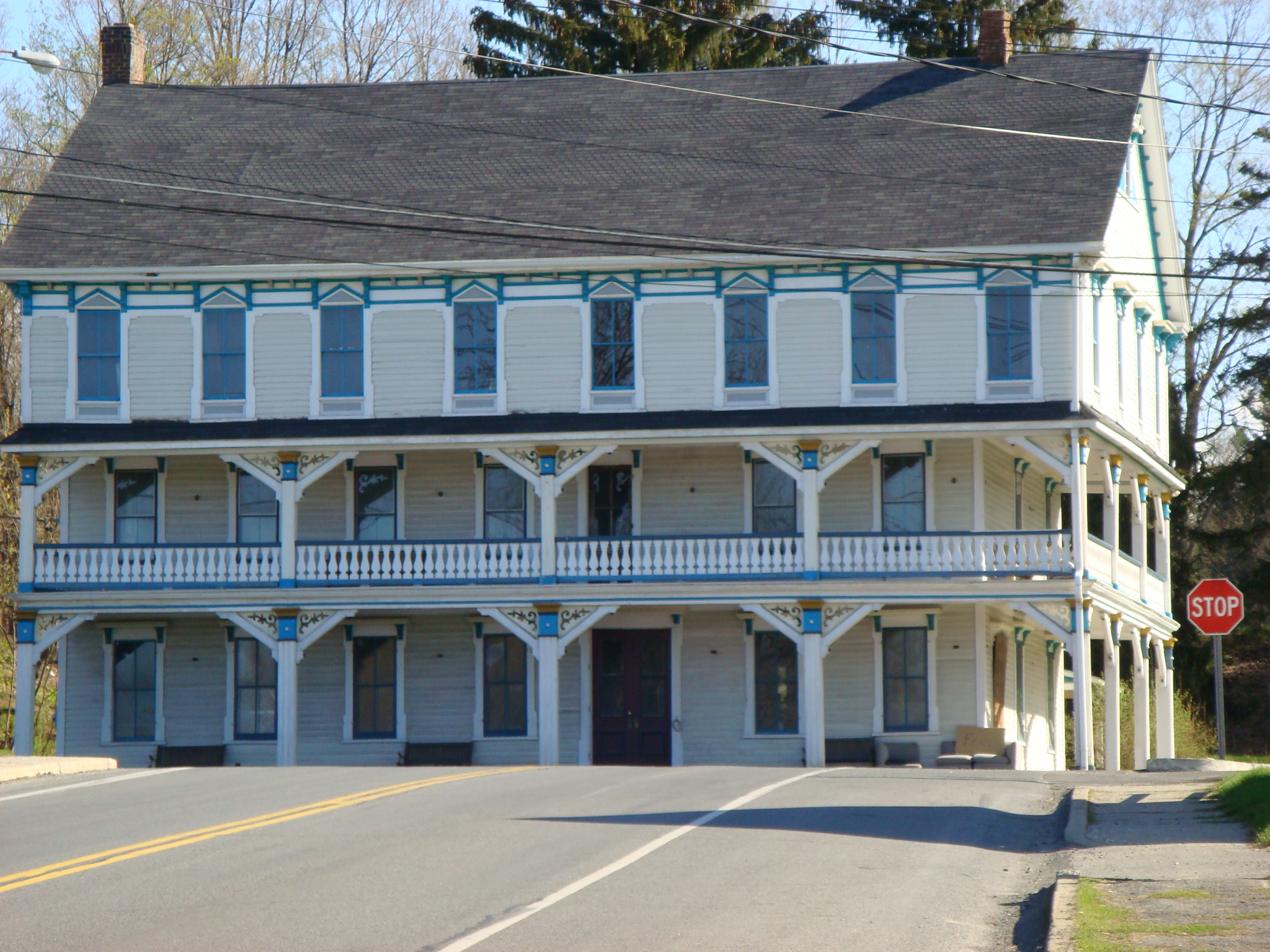
- South elevation and east profile, 2008

- Location within New York Location within the United States
- Location: Hoosick, New York, US
- Nearest city: Bennington, Vermont
- Coordinates: 42°55′42″N 73°20′33″W
- Area: 1.5 acres (0.61 ha)
- Built: ca. 1850
- Architect: Nairn Burgess
- Architectural style: Greek Revival, Victorian
- NRHP reference No.: 96000684
- Added to NRHP: June 21, 1996

The Delaney Hotel, also the North Hoosick Hotel and Hathaway Hotel, is located at the junction of NY 22 and 67 in the hamlet of Hoosick, New York, United States. It is a large Greek Revival-style building dating to the middle of the 19th century with some later Italianate decoration. Few alterations have been made, and it is a well-preserved example of vernacular interpretations of those styles in a rural building.

It was a stagecoach and railroad stop in its peak years. Later owners continued to operate it as a hotel, despite declining business, into the middle of the 20th century. After a period of vacancy and decline, it was listed on the National Register of Historic Places in 1995. In the 1980s it was nearly demolished. Recently a new set of owners has proposed to turn it into a bed and breakfast.

== Building ==
The hotel sits on a 1.5-acre (0.61 ha) atop a small rise facing the three-way intersection where NY 67 comes in from Vermont to the east and NY 22 comes in from Hoosick Falls to the south, crossing the Walloomsac River just before reaching the hotel. The bridge gives northbound traffic a good view of the hotel's south (front) facade as it approaches. The two highways run concurrently to the west of the intersection to eventually turn north into Washington County, where they separate again.

The building itself is a three-and-a-half-story, eight-by-two-bay clapboard-sided frame structure on a stone foundation topped by a moderately pitched side-gabled roof. Brick chimneys rise at either end. At the front and rear rooflines are eaves supported by decorative brackets.

Dominating the front facade is the full-length two-story porch, recessed under the third story. Both stories feature Stick Style diagonal braces. The second story has sawcut balusters. The third story windows have bracketed crowns.

A central double wooden door on the first story serves as the main entrance, with a secondary one on the east facade. Both have wooden surrounds. A similar window to those on the front facade is situated in the east gable apex. There is a two-story addition on the rear giving the hotel a rough "T" shape. Two outbuildings in the rear, once the hotel's icehouse and chicken coop, are so badly deteriorated as to no longer be contributing to the property's historic character.

The interior has been extensively altered. The first floor is now entirely open, with its original hardwood floor. The bars in the tavern room, including the intricately carved rear one, remains. An original walnut banister is on the stairs to the second floor, where the walls have old posters of vaudeville performers from the late 19th century. The third floor's ballroom remains.

== History ==
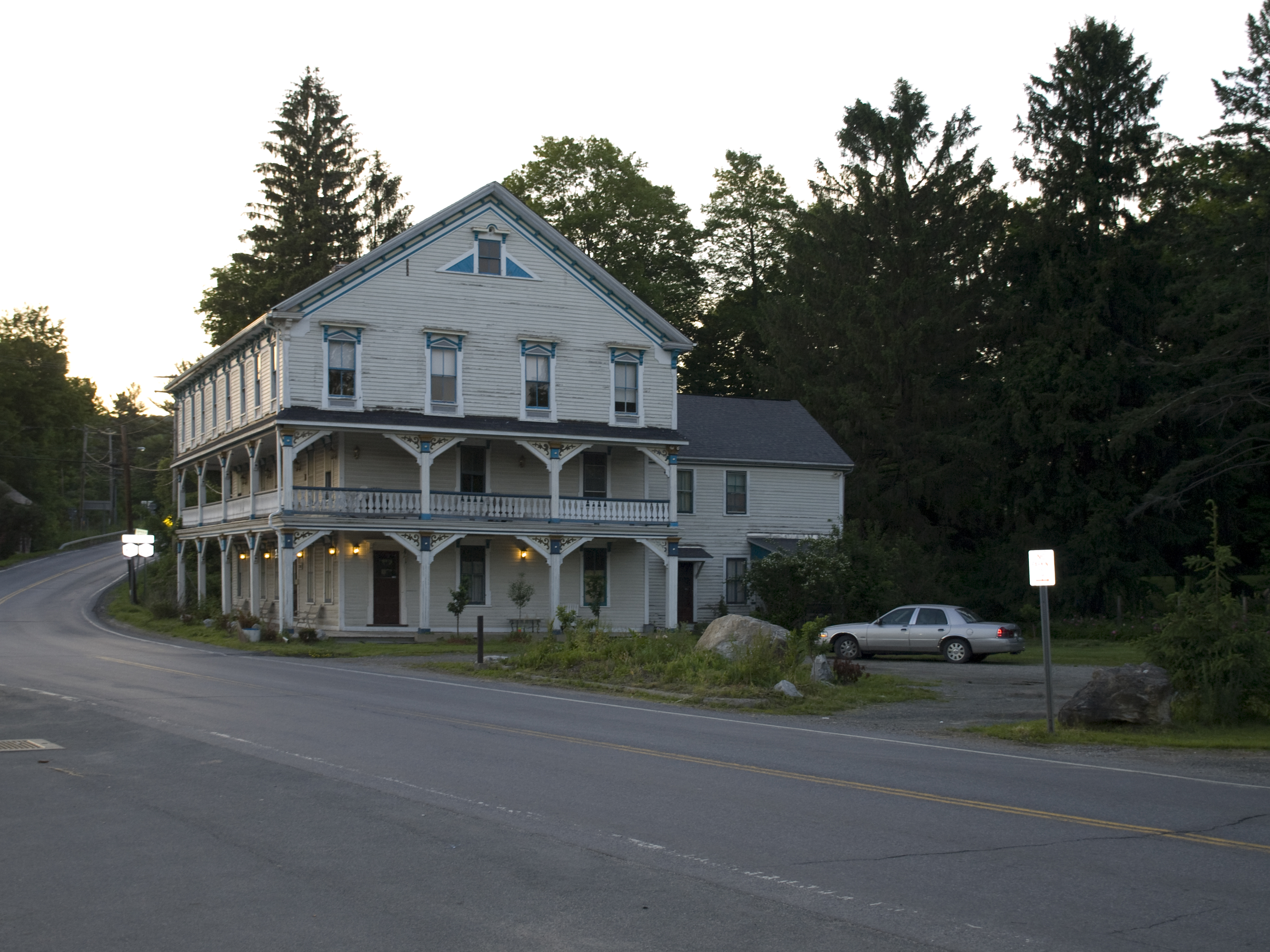
Delaney Hotel from the East

Benajah Burgess, a local farmer, originally owned the land. When he died in 1831, it was divided between his three sons. Three years later, two of them gave their portions to Nairn, the third.

The area was slowly beginning to industrialize, and by 1836 there were factories making flannel and scythes in North Hoosick. Around 1850 Nairn Burgess built the hotel on his property to fill the demand for lodging, as many of the workers at the factory were migrants whose families lived elsewhere. It was also a stagecoach stop. A large barn, since demolished, sheltered horses and buggies.

Burgess sold the hotel in 1871. After some very rapid transfers of ownership, it became Daniel Randall's property. He in turn sold it six years later, in 1877. It became known as the Eldred House after its new owner, Perry Eldred. In 1894 it was inherited by his young daughter Frances, who had still not attained the age of 21 when the executors of her father's estate sold it to Chase Hathaway, a major landowner in early 20th-century Hoosick. The building became known as the Hathaway Hotel.

Two years later, Hathaway sold it to Ida Delaney, a former manager. Her family would own it for over half a century. The area's industrial base declined, and in 1930 the hotel's ballroom could no longer be used as a venue for traveling vaudeville acts because it lacked a fire escape. The local economy rebounded slightly, along with the hotel, during World War II when the old factories were used for weapons manufacture.

After the war things slowed down again. The hotel was now operated by Ida Delaney's sons-in-law. Another of her daughters, Anna, had married a wealthy judge and spent most of the summer at the hotel with several servants. Her attempts to bail out the hotel financially led to friction with her in-laws. She inherited the hotel when her sister died in 1964, and eventually sold it, leading to a period of many different owners, none of whom could successfully operate the hotel.

It began to decline. In 1974 it was used for some scenes in The Catamount Killing (1974), starring Horst Buchholz, Ann Wedgeworth and Polly Holliday. Most were exteriors, and the few interiors used were dim, perhaps to conceal the building's decline.

It was in such serious disrepair that by the 1980s Stewart's Shops was considering buying it and demolishing it to build one of their convenience stores on the property. A petition drive led by a local resident, Dianne Bingham, led the company to reconsider and instead build across the intersection. A Long Island architect bought the property instead, intending to renovate it, but did nothing for several years.

Several years later, Larry Stevens, who met and married Bingham during the petition drive, decided to buy the hotel. The couple spent weekends repairing it. They repainted it, reinforced the walls, put in a new septic system and gutted the interior with the intent of opening it as a bed and breakfast for tourists visiting the nearby home of Grandma Moses and Bennington Battlefield. During those renovations, they found late 19th-century posters for vaudeville acts on the second floor, and have kept them there.

== See also ==
- National Register of Historic Places listings in Rensselaer County, New York
