= Auclair–Button Farmstead =

- U.S. National Register of Historic Places
- U.S. Historic district
- Location within New York Location within the United States
- Location: 80 Auclair Way, Melrose, New York
- Coordinates: 42°48′34″N 73°34′40″W
- Area: 157.05 acres (63.56 ha)
- Built: c. 1785
- Architectural style: Mid 19th century, Early Republic
- MPS: Farmsteads of Pittstown, New York MPS
- NRHP reference No.: 13000360
- Added to NRHP: June 5, 2013

Auclair–Button Farmstead is a historic home and farm and national historic district located at Melrose, Rensselaer County, New York. The original section of the farmhouse was built about 1785, with the main block built in 1849. It is a two-story, five-bay, frame house with a side-gabled roof. It features a full-width front porch. Also on the property are the contributing garage (c. 1930), ice house (c. 1900), tenant house (c. 1805-1840) and garage (c. 1930), shop barn (c. 1810-1830), dairy barn (c. 1901), milk house (c. 1910), horse barn (c. 1820–1840, c. 1894, c. 1900), hen house (c. 1910), and corn crib (c. 1900).

It was listed on the National Register of Historic Places in 2013.
