= Hart-Cluett Mansion =

Historic house in New York, United States

- U.S. National Register of Historic Places
- U.S. Historic district – Contributing property
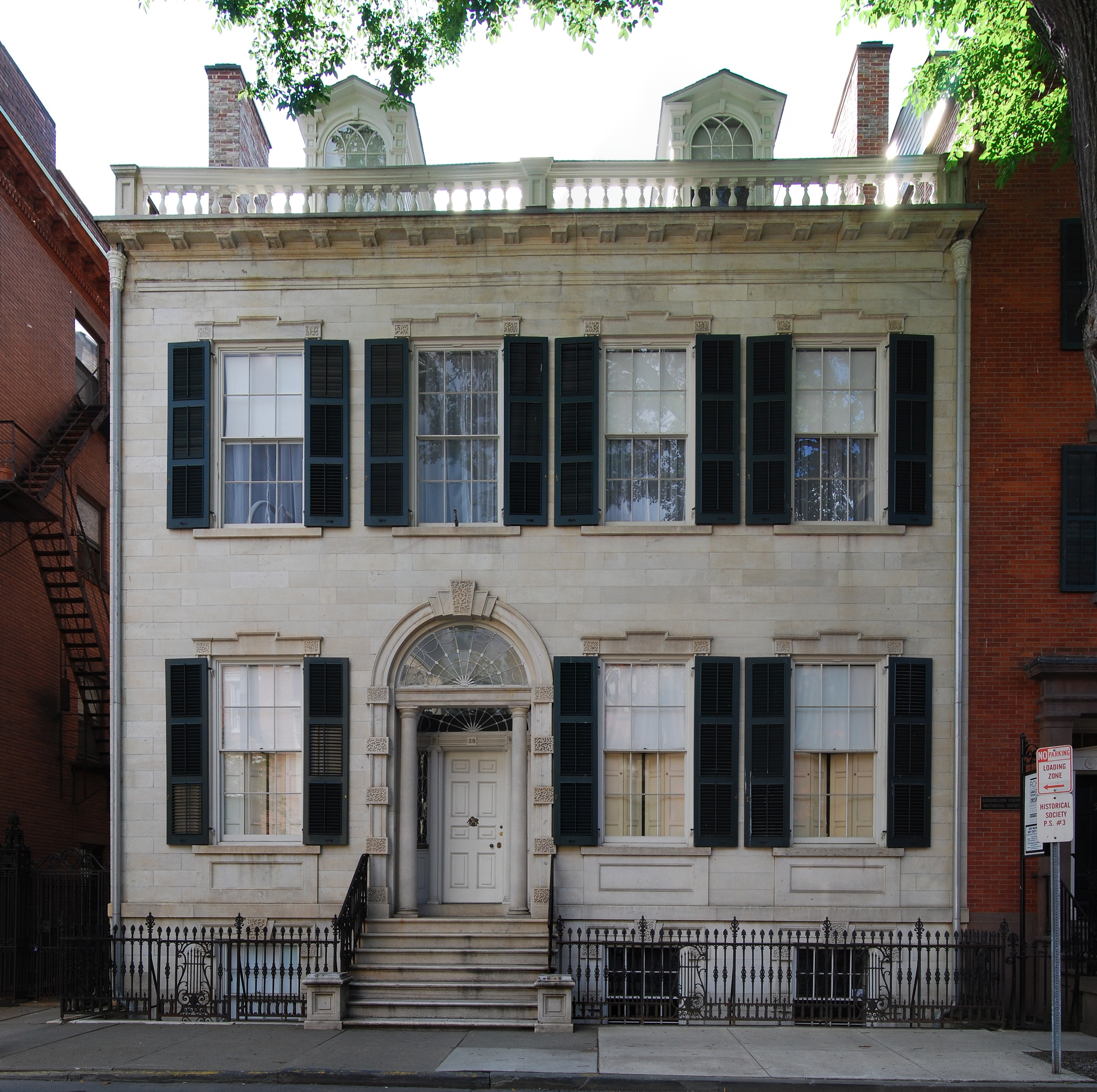
- Front (east) elevation, 2009

- Location within New York Location within the United States
- Location: Troy, NY
- Coordinates: 42°43′46″N 73°41′31″W
- Built: 1827
- Architect: Martin E. Thompson
- Architectural style: Federal
- Part of: Central Troy Historic District (ID86001527)
- NRHP reference No.: 73001256

Significant dates
- Added to NRHP: April 11, 1973
- Designated CP: August 13, 1986

The Hart-Cluett Mansion is located at 57 Second Street in Troy, New York, United States. It was listed on the National Register of Historic Places in 1973, and is a contributing property to the Central Troy Historic District created in 1986. Since the 1950s it, and the Carr Building next door, was the main office of the Rensselaer County Historical Society before the organization changed its name to the Hart Cluett Museum at Historic Rensselaer County in 2019. The house is open to the public as a historic house museum.

Built in 1827 from a most likely created by architect Martin E. Thompson, of New York City, it is a Federal style townhouse with decorated marble and limestone facing considered one of the best and most intact houses in that style in the city of Troy. The house was built by John Bard Colgrove, who moved to Troy, NY in 1826 to oversee the construction of the Hart House. Immediately after constructing the Hart House, Colgrove built the first Rensselaer County Court House (1828–31). It was constructed as a gift for his only child, Betsey Howard Hart, and her husband, Richard P. Hart, by wealthy New York City merchant and banker William Howard, done in a style similar to contemporary mansions there. Those homes have since been demolished, making Troy the only extant place visitors can experience an early 19th-century New York City mansion.

In the late 19th century it became the property of another local businessman, George Cluett, who expanded it in the early 20th century. In 1910, the property was sold to his nephew Albert Cluett and his wife Caroline. Caroline Cluett donated the house to the Historical Society in 1952.

== Building ==
The house is L-shaped, two and a half stories high with a full basement. The short end facing the street to its east and the long end wrapping around the brick house to its north. The front facade is four bays wide; the southern facade, accounting for the house's full depth from the street and overlooking a narrow alley, nine. All other facades save the front are done in brick.

That front facade is dominated by its off-center entrance. The recessed door is set in a portico, with elliptical fanlight supported by small columns and sidelights. Around the portico are a marble architrave with vermiculated keystone and quoins. No similar marble houses, are found in Troy, or the vicinity. The marble is presumed to come from a Berkshire quarry, possibly near Great Barrington, Mass. The marble has vertical comb finish, approximately 6 to the inch and is laid with 1/8" lime mortar joints.

The tin gabled roof has two dormer windows on the east side. Two chimneys apiece rise from the north and south ends. There is one outbuilding, a former carriage house, in the rear of the building.

Inside, the house follows the standard Federal-style central hall plan, with high ceilings and narrow, tall windows. Much of the original furnishings and trim remain. The plaster and woodwork are unaltered, as are such details as a marble mantelpiece and dining room mirror. The original basement kitchen remains, along with a late 19th-century one on the first floor.

== History ==
Hart, an early member of Troy's business elite, was a personal friend of Howard when he married Betsey. He had made his money first by supplying the Army during the War of 1812 and then in commerce from the Erie and Champlain canals. He later served as president of the Schenectady and Troy Railroad and several local philanthropies. He had a political career as well, serving as a state assemblyman and mayor of Troy.

To build the house, 29-year-old John Colegrove was hired. He moved to Troy from New York in 1826 to supervise the job, and stayed there, going on to build many other notable buildings in the city. His obituary in 1860 referred to the mansion as his first major local accomplishment.

RCHS logo

The original house was just the square block. The house was first enlarged in 1836 when Richard Hart was Mayor of Troy. Richard Hart died in 1843. Betsey remained in the house till her death in 1886 and her daughter Sarah Wool Hart was the last Hart to live in the house. She died in 1892 and the house was then sold to George B. Cluett, founder of Cluett, Peabody & Co. Inc. makers of Arrow Shirts. George and his wife Amanda had a new addition built that moved the kitchen to the first floor, replacing the original basement kitchen. He sold the house to his nephew Albert E. Cluett, in 1910.

Albert and Caroline Cluett made alterations on the third floor, raising the roof to accommodate the growing needs of their four sons. New oak floors, picture and chair rail mouldings all in the Colonial Revival Style were added to the two parlors and entrance hall. The old wallpaper was removed and the walls were painted ivory. A scenic wallpaper from the Zuber & Co. of Paris, France was installed on the walls of the Entrance Hall on the first floor.

Albert Cluett died in 1949 but not before he and his wife Caroline challenged the Board of Trustees at RCHS to raise money to support the preservation of the house. Caroline lived in the house until 1952 when she then signed the house over to RCHS. The society has maintained it as a historic house museum and uses the adjoining Joseph B. Carr Building (57 2nd Street) as their museum headquarters that house the changing exhibition galleries, research library, collection storage and administrative offices.

== Museum ==
The house is open to the public the 2nd Saturday of the month at 2pm for a guided tour, May through December. Tours are also available by prior appointment. 2nd Saturday tours are $10.00 for adults.

== Floor Plan and Elevation ==
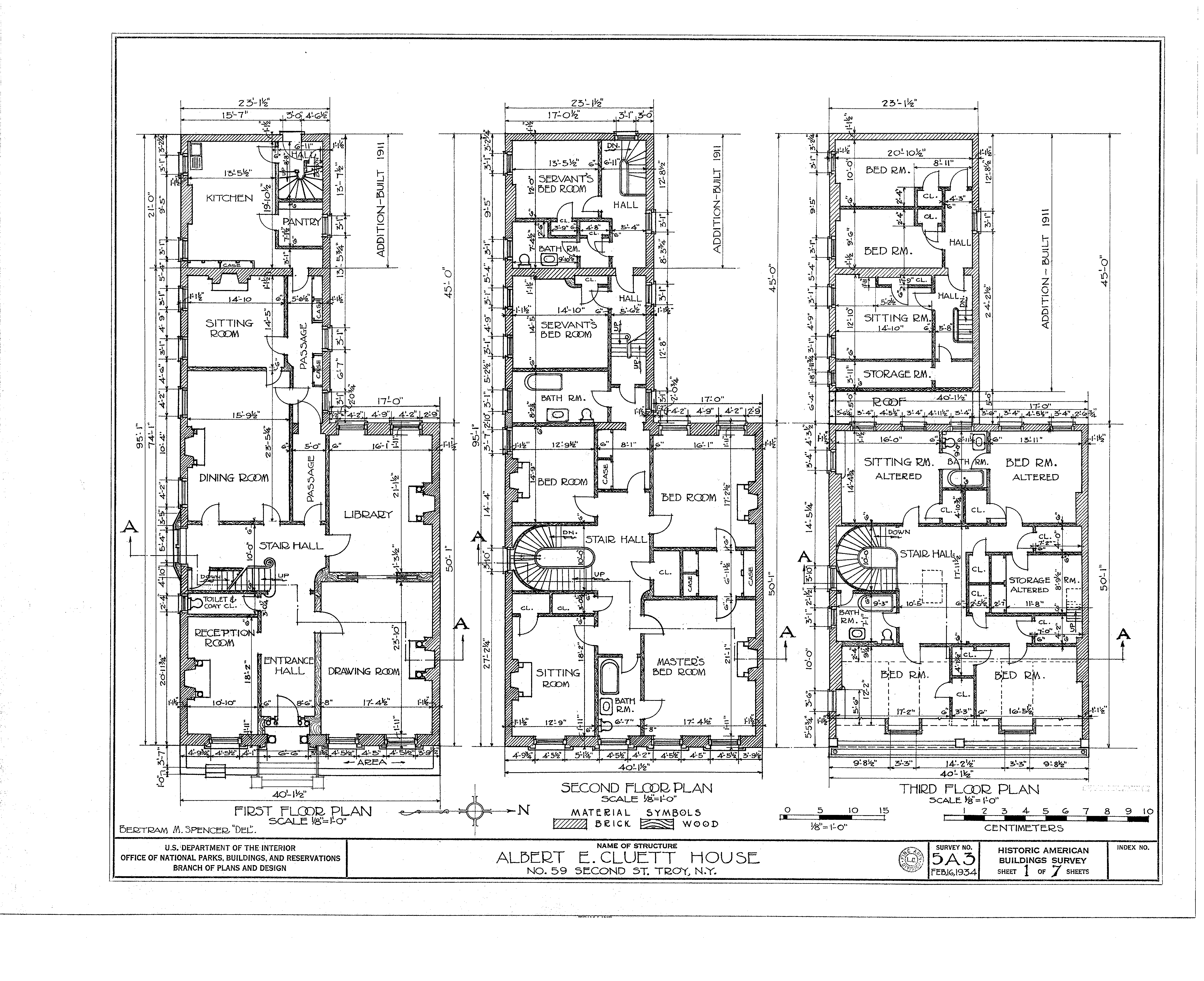
Floor Plan Hart Cluett Mansion, Historic American Buildings Survey, 1934

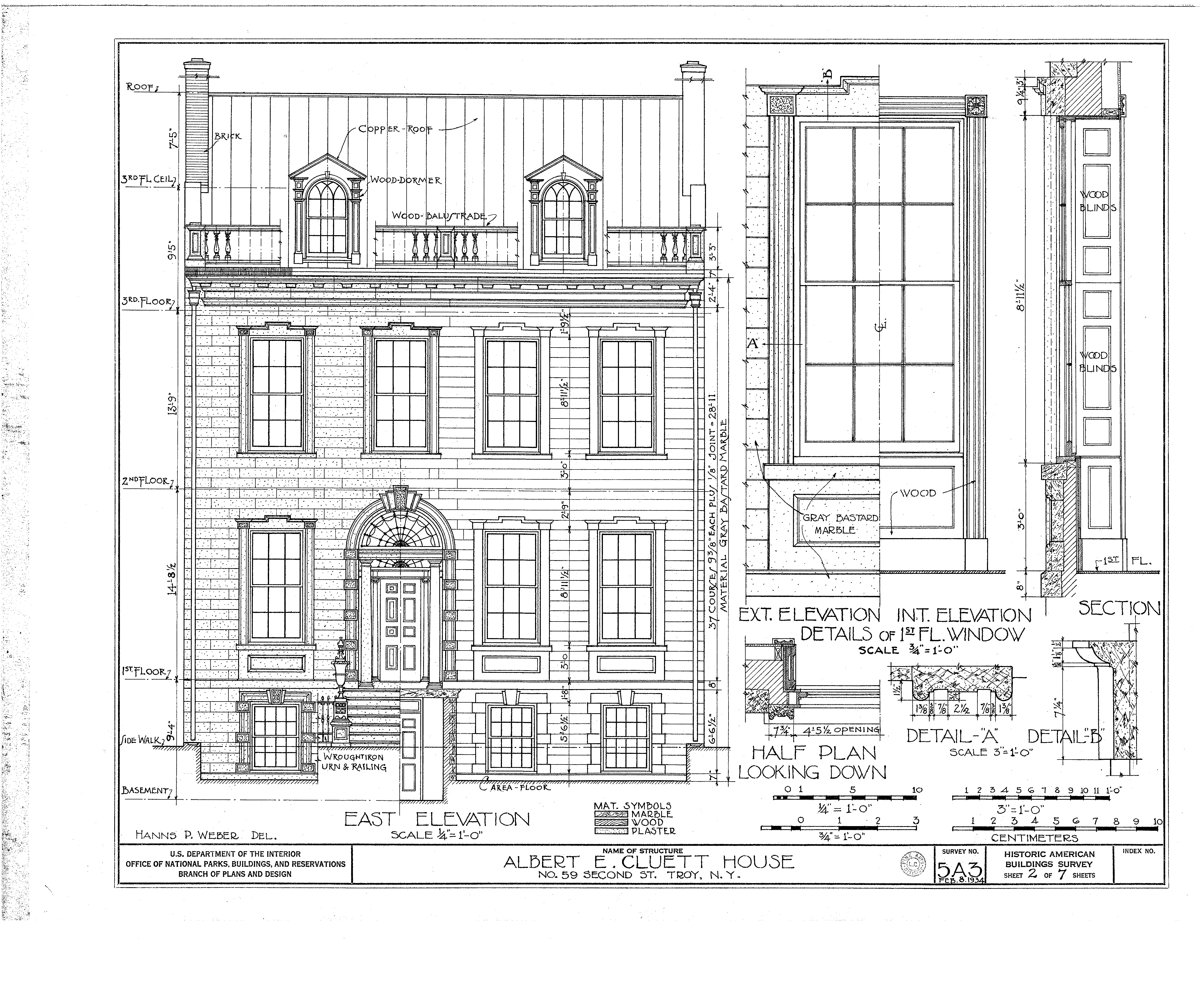
Elevation Hart Cluett Mansion, Historic American Buildings Survey 1934
