= Adams–Myers–Bryan Farmstead =

- U.S. National Register of Historic Places
- U.S. Historic district
- Location within New York Location within the United States
- Location: 314 Stover Rd., Valley Falls, New York
- Coordinates: 42°53′22″N 73°33′48″W
- Area: 112.07 acres (45.35 ha)
- Built: c. 1800
- Architectural style: Greek Revival, Early Republic
- MPS: Farmsteads of Pittstown, New York MPS
- NRHP reference No.: 13000629
- Added to NRHP: August 27, 2013

Adams–Myers–Bryan Farmstead is a historic home and farm and national historic district located at Valley Falls, Rensselaer County, New York. The farmhouse was built about 1855, and consists of three blocks. It consists of a two-story, Greek Revival style main block with a two-story side wing and 1 1/2-story rear ell. Also on the property are the contributing main barn group (c. 1860, c. 1880–1930), pump house (c. 1920–1940), milk house (c. 1920–1940), horse barn (c. 1850), corn house (c. 1850), pig house (mid-19th century), carriage barn (c. 1860–1875), ice house (c. 1900), and outhouse (c. 1900).

It was listed on the National Register of Historic Places in 2013.
