= Pumpkin House =

Historic house in New York, United States

- U.S. National Register of Historic Places
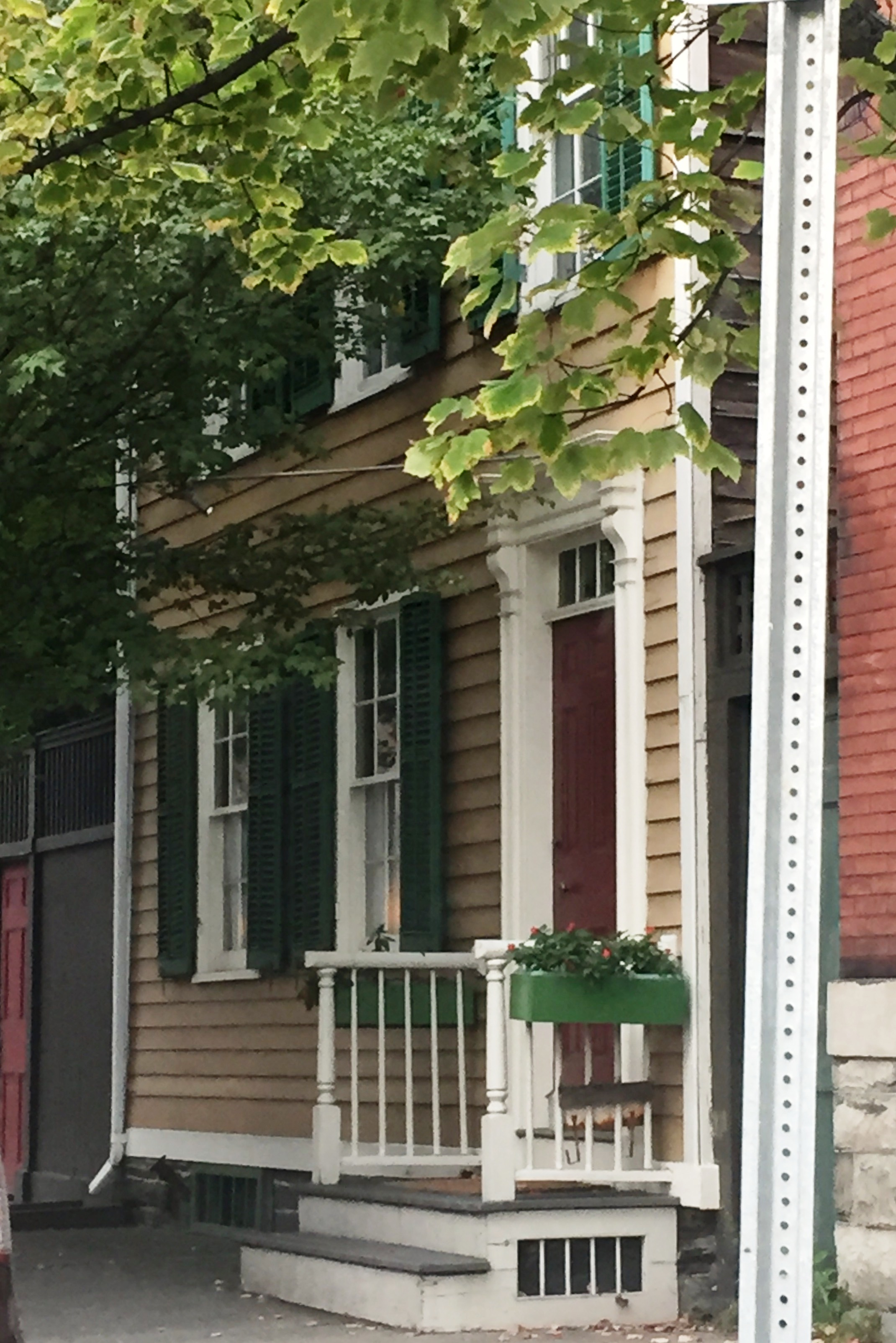

- Location within New York Location within the United States
- Location: 180 Fourth St., Troy, New York
- Coordinates: 42°43′35″N 73°41′26″W
- Area: less than one acre
- Built: 1820
- Architectural style: Federal
- NRHP reference No.: 98000573
- Added to NRHP: June 8, 1998

Pumpkin House, also known as Hart Tenant House, is a historic home in Troy, Rensselaer County, New York. It was built in about 1820 and is a two-story, three-bay Federal period frame residence with a high pitched gable roof parallel to the street. It has a large, two-story rear wing built in two stages, in about 1830 and about 1870. It was restored in the 1990s.

It was listed on the National Register of Historic Places in 1998.
