= Cannon–Brownell–Herrington Farmstead =

- Cannon-Brownell-Herrington Farmstead
- U.S. National Register of Historic Places
- Location within New York Location within the United States
- Location: 551 Otter Creek Rd., near Johnsonville, New York
- Coordinates: 42°52′57″N 73°30′11″W
- Area: 195 acres (79 ha)
- Built: c. 1807
- Built by: Quakenbush, Melvin
- Architectural style: Mid 19th century, Early Republic
- MPS: Farmsteads of Pittstown, New York MPS
- NRHP reference No.: 12001131
- Added to NRHP: January 2, 2013

Cannon–Brownell–Herrington Farmstead is a historic home and farm located near Johnsonville, Rensselaer County, New York. The original section of the farmhouse was built about 1830, with the central block and wing added about 1870. The house consists of a two-story, central block with flanking 1 1/2-story wings. It has a long woodshed ell, now converted to an apartment. Also on the property are the contributing corn crib (c. 1865-1900), main barn group (c. 1862, 1895, 1960s), and sheep barn (c. 1899).

It was listed on the National Register of Historic Places in 2013.
