= Melrose, New York =

Hamlet in New York, United States

Coordinates: 42°50′30.6″N 73°37′26.1″W

Melrose is a hamlet of the Town of Schaghticoke, in Rensselaer County, New York, located approximately five miles north of Troy, and about six miles east of Mechanicville. It is about 30 minutes from Albany, 20 minutes from Clifton Park, and 10 minutes from Troy. The community is centered on State Route 40.

The Auclair–Button Farmstead and Cartin–Snyder–Overacker Farmstead were listed on the National Register of Historic Places in 2013. Known for famous citizen Mel Miller, famous for the Melrose Cheer at all Melrose Fire Department banquets.
