= Nassau (village), New York =

Village in Rensselaer County, New York, US

Nassau, New York
- Village
- Location in Rensselaer County and the state of New York.

- Location within the state of New York
- Coordinates: 42°31′N 73°37′W
- Country: United States
- State: New York
- County: Rensselaer

Government
  - Type: Incorporated Village
  - Mayor: Robert Valenty

Area
  - Total: 0.70 sq mi (1.81 km^{2})
  - Land: 0.70 sq mi (1.81 km^{2})
  - Water: 0 sq mi (0.00 km^{2})
- Elevation: 404 ft (123 m)

Population (2020)
  - Total: 1,103
  - Density: 1,578.5/sq mi (609.48/km^{2})
- Time zone: UTC-5 (Eastern (EST))
  - Summer (DST): UTC-4 (EDT)
- ZIP code: 12123
- Area code: 518
- FIPS code: 36-49506
- GNIS feature ID: 0958278
- Website: https://www.villageofnassau.gov/

Nassau is a village located in the Town of Nassau in Rensselaer County, New York, United States. The population was 1,133 at the 2010 census.

The Village of Nassau is in the southern part of the county in the Town of Nassau, with a small western portion in the Town of Schodack. Nassau is bordered on the west by the Valatie Kill and Schodack township and is 15 miles east of Albany, New York state's capital city.

== History ==
The village is near the site of the first settlement of the town, which took place circa 1760. The community was first known as "Union Village." The village was originally incorporated in the 19th century as "Schermerhorn's Village," receiving charters in 1819 and 1866, but abandoned that village status until it more recently gained incorporation as Nassau Village.

The Albany Avenue Historic District, Chatham Street Row, and Church Street Historic District are listed on the National Register of Historic Places.

== Geography ==
Nassau is located at 42°31′N 73°37′W (42.5152, -73.6111). According to the United States Census Bureau, the village has a total area of 0.7 square mile (1.8 km^{2}), all land.

== Demographics ==
Historical population
Census	Pop.	Note	%±
1870	348		—
1880	449		29.0%
1890	356		−20.7%
1900	418		17.4%
1910	529		26.6%
1920	655		23.8%
1930	670		2.3%
1940	698		4.2%
1950	952		36.4%
1960	1,248		31.1%
1970	1,466		17.5%
1980	1,285		−12.3%
1990	1,254		−2.4%
2000	1,161		−7.4%
2010	1,133		−2.4%
2020	1,103		−2.6%
U.S. Decennial Census

As of the census of 2000, there were 1,161 people, 490 households, and 321 families residing in the village. The population density was 1,705.2 inhabitants per square mile (658.4/km^{2}). There were 529 housing units at an average density of 776.9 per square mile (300.0/km^{2}). The racial makeup of the village was 96.99% White, 0.86% Black or African American, 0.43% Native American, 0.34% Asian, 0.09% from other races, and 1.29% from two or more races. Hispanic or Latino of any race were 0.86% of the population.

There were 490 households, out of which 31.6% had children under the age of 18 living with them, 48.6% were married couples living together, 13.1% had a female householder with no husband present, and 34.3% were non-families. 29.0% of all households were made up of individuals, and 12.4% had someone living alone who was 65 years of age or older. The average household size was 2.37 and the average family size was 2.92.

In the village, the population was spread out, with 24.4% under the age of 18, 6.9% from 18 to 24, 29.5% from 25 to 44, 25.4% from 45 to 64, and 13.9% who were 65 years of age or older. The median age was 38 years. For every 100 females, there were 89.1 males. For every 100 females age 18 and over, there were 86.0 males.

The median income for a household in the village was $40,789, and the median income for a family was $49,500. Males had a median income of $37,986 versus $27,768 for females. The per capita income for the village was $19,199. About 5.3% of families and 7.3% of the population were below the poverty line, including 9.6% of those under age 18 and 10.9% of those age 65 or over.
