= Oakwood Avenue Presbyterian Church =

Historic church in New York, United States

- U.S. National Register of Historic Places
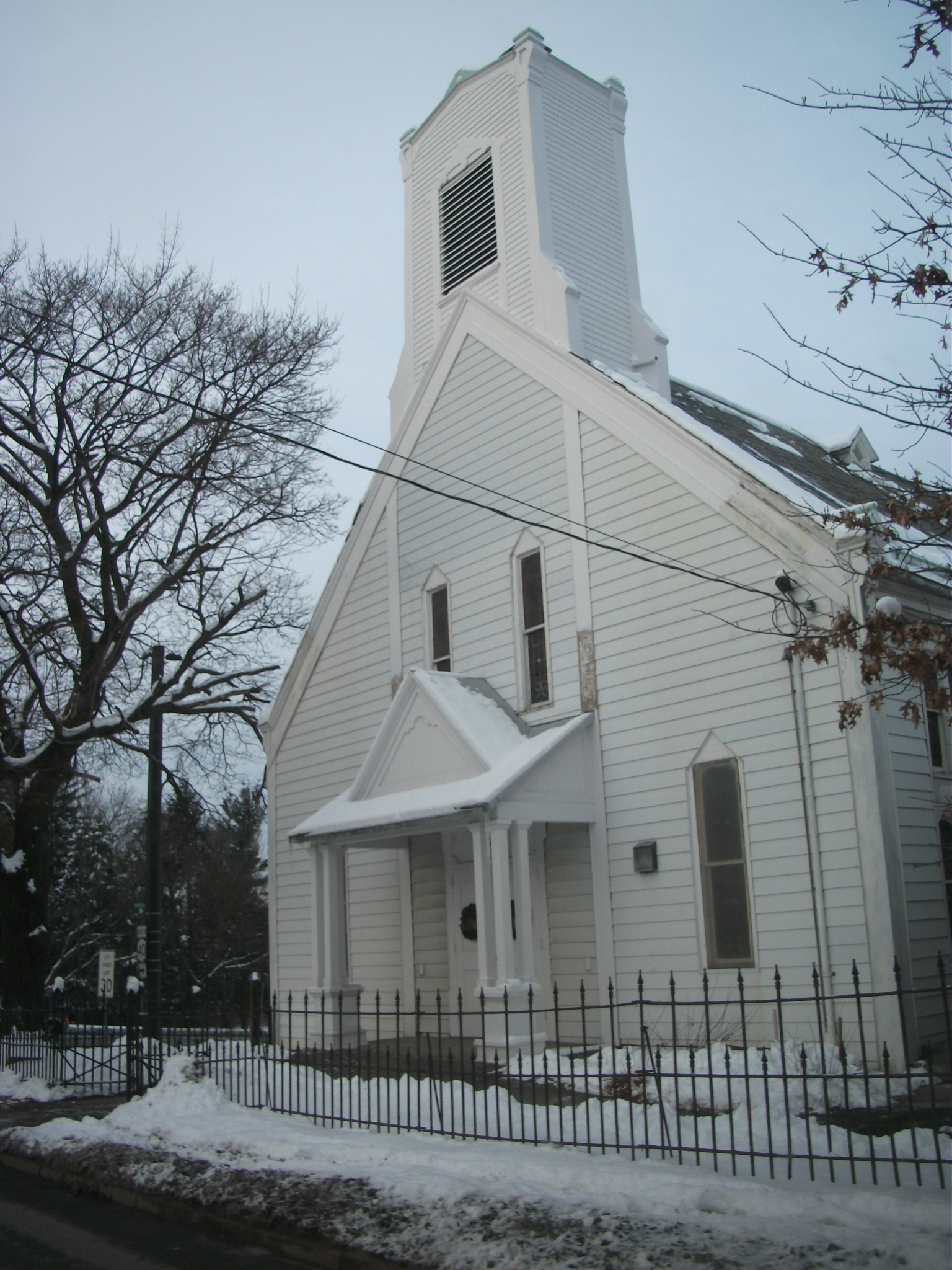
- Oakwood Avenue Presbyterian Church, January 2011

- Location within New York Location within the United States
- Location: 313 10th St., Troy, New York
- Coordinates: 42°44′24″N 73°40′47″W
- Area: 0.22 acres (0.089 ha)
- Built: 1868
- Architectural style: Late Victorian
- NRHP reference No.: 12000959
- Added to NRHP: November 21, 2012

Oakwood Avenue Presbyterian Church is a historic Presbyterian church located at Troy, Rensselaer County, New York. It was built in 1868, and is a two-story, three bay by five bay, rectangular frame building. It has a gable roof topped by belfry. An education wing was added in 1957.

It was listed on the National Register of Historic Places in 2012.
