= Baum–Wallis Farmstead =

- U.S. National Register of Historic Places
- Location within New York Location within the United States
- Location: 132 Baum Rd., near Johnsonville, New York
- Coordinates: 42°53′27″N 73°30′21″W
- Area: 91.86 acres (37.17 ha)
- Built: c. 1811
- Architectural style: Mid 19th century, Early Republic
- MPS: Farmsteads of Pittstown, New York MPS
- NRHP reference No.: 12001130
- Added to NRHP: January 2, 2013

Baum–Wallis Farmstead is a historic home and farm located near Johnsonville, Rensselaer County, New York. The farmhouse was built about 1811, and is a one-story, square frame dwelling on a stone foundation. It has a gable roof with dormer added about 1915. Also on the property are the contributing wagon barn (c. 1900), main barn group (c. 1815, c. 1826, c. 1945), corn crib (c. 1900), ice house / milk house / well house (c. 1900, c. 1946), and pig house / garage (c. 1900, c. 1950-1960).

It was listed on the National Register of Historic Places in 2013.
