= Church Street Historic District (Nassau, New York) =

Historic district in New York, United States

- U.S. National Register of Historic Places
- U.S. Historic district
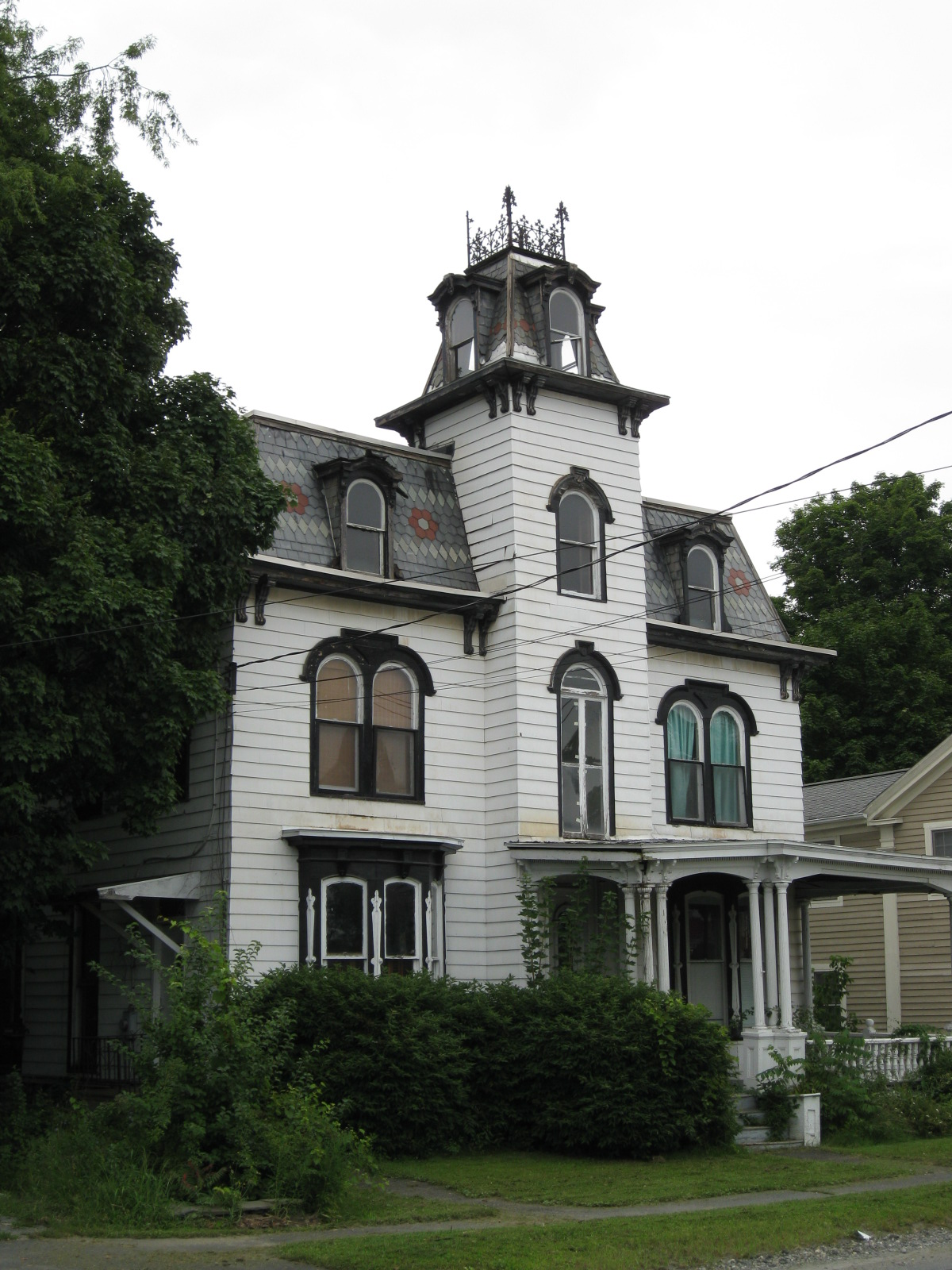
- 7 Church St. August 2009

- Location within New York Location within the United States
- Location: Church St., Nassau, New York
- Coordinates: 42°30′54″N 73°36′26″W
- Area: 12 acres (4.9 ha)
- Built: 1685
- Architectural style: Late Victorian, Second Empire, Federal
- NRHP reference No.: 78001901
- Added to NRHP: November 21, 1978

Church Street Historic District is a national historic district located at Nassau in Rensselaer County, New York. It consists of 36 contributing buildings located along Church Street. They include a variety of residential and ecclesiastical building. New England Federal style buildings predominate, with a number of notable Victorian period buildings, including a Second Empire residence dated to the 1870s. Notable churches include St. Mary's Church (1925), Nassau Reformed Church (1901), and Grace United Methodist Church (1833).

It was listed on the National Register of Historic Places in 1978.
