= W. P. Irwin Bank Building =

Historic commercial building in New York, United States

- U.S. National Register of Historic Places
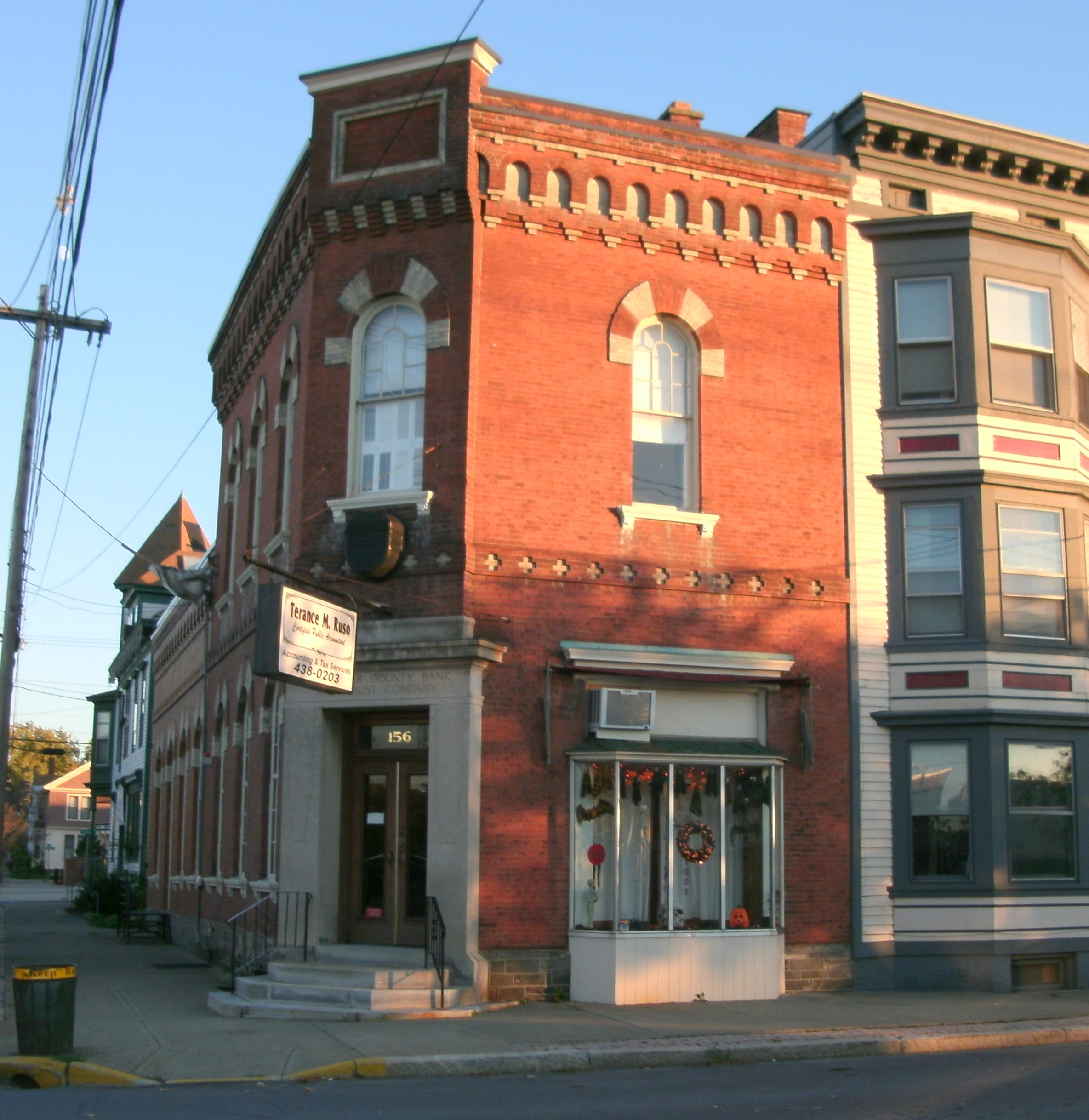
- W. P. Irwin Bank Building, October 2010

- Location within New York Location within the United States
- Location: 156 Broadway, Rensselaer, New York
- Coordinates: 42.63841°N 73.74711°W
- Area: less than one acre
- Built: 1873
- Architectural style: Gothic
- NRHP reference No.: 07001036
- Added to NRHP: October 3, 2007

W. P. Irwin Bank Building is a historic bank building located at Rensselaer in Rensselaer County, New York. It was originally built in 1873 and is a 2-story, rectangular flat-roofed, masonry structure on a stone foundation. A 1 1/2-story, four-bay flat-roofed brick rear wing was added in 1905. The building exhibits a number of Gothic Revival details.

It was listed on the National Register of Historic Places in 2007.
