= Poesten Kill Gorge Historic District =

Historic district in New York, United States

- U.S. National Register of Historic Places
- U.S. Historic district
- Nearest city: Troy, New York
- Area: 37 acres (15 ha)
- Built: 1870
- NRHP reference No.: 78001903
- Added to NRHP: March 8, 1978

Poesten Kill Gorge Historic District, also known as Poesten Kill Gorge Conservation Area, is a national historic district located at Troy in Rensselaer County, New York. It consists of two contributing buildings, eight contributing sites, and two contributing structures. The district encompasses extant structures, ruins, power sources, and archaeological sites associated with industrial development in this area from the 17th to mid-20th centuries.

It was listed on the National Register of Historic Places in 1978.
