= Cartin–Snyder–Overacker Farmstead =

- U.S. National Register of Historic Places
- Location within New York Location within the United States
- Location: 559 Cushman Rd., Melrose, New York
- Coordinates: 42°50′00″N 73°33′31″W
- Area: 126.14 acres (51.05 ha)
- Built: c. 1800
- Architectural style: Mid 19th century, Early Republic
- MPS: Farmsteads of Pittstown, New York MPS
- NRHP reference No.: 13000361
- Added to NRHP: June 5, 2013

Cartin–Snyder–Overacker Farmstead is a historic farm located at Melrose, Rensselaer County, New York. The farmstead includes a number of contributing outbuildings. The farmhouse was built in 1974 to replace one burned that year. The contributing resources include the outhouse (c. 1900), garage (c. 1920s), ice house (c. 1900), milk house (c. 1920s), chicken house (c. 1920s), threshing barn (c. 1810), tool barn (c. 1810), horse barn (c. 1840-1860), and rabbit house (c. 1940).

It was listed on the National Register of Historic Places in 2013.
