= Chatham Street Row =

Historic houses in New York, United States

- U.S. National Register of Historic Places
- Location within New York Location within the United States
- Location: Chatham St., Nassau, New York
- Coordinates: 42°30′53″N 73°36′40″W
- Area: 3 acres (1.2 ha)
- Built: 1864
- Architectural style: Federal, Moorish
- NRHP reference No.: 78001900
- Added to NRHP: December 1, 1978

Chatham Street Row, also known as the Chatham Street Historic District, is a set of five historic buildings located at Nassau in Rensselaer County, New York. They were built between 1812 and 1880. They include the Vandenberg House (No. 18, 1870), Louisa Heusted House (No. 20, ca. 1880), and the Heusted Store (No. 14, 1864). The Vandenberg House and Louisa Heusted House are notable for the decorative scrollwork on their verandah. Also included is the Phillip Cook House (No. 16, 1812), a five bay, brick Federal style dwelling and the Parsonage (No. 22, 1839).

It was listed on the National Register of Historic Places in 1978.
