= Halford–Hayner Farmstead =

- U.S. National Register of Historic Places
- Location within New York Location within the United States
- Location: 346 Cooksboro Rd., near Troy, New York
- Coordinates: 42°49′30″N 73°35′29″W
- Area: 80.05 acres (32.40 ha)
- Built: c. 1800
- Architectural style: Mid 19th century, Early Republic
- MPS: Farmsteads of Pittstown, New York MPS
- NRHP reference No.: 12001131
- Added to NRHP: January 2, 2013

Halford–Hayner Farmstead is a historic home and farm located near Troy, Rensselaer County, New York. The farmhouse was built between about 1835 and 1850, and consists of a 1 1/2-story, five-bay, frame main block with a later two-story rear ell. Also on the property are the contributing shed (c. 1900), ice house (c. 1900), main barn group (c. 1800–1815, c. 1820–1840, c. 1870), wagon / tool barn (c. 1830-1850), hay barn (c. 1870-1900), and shop / garage (c. 1915).

It was listed on the National Register of Historic Places in 2013.
