= Cornell–Manchester Farmstead =

- U.S. National Register of Historic Places
- Location within New York Location within the United States
- Location: 292 Lower Pine Valley Rd., near Hoosick Falls, New York
- Coordinates: 42°52′19″N 73°26′27″W
- Area: 134.01 acres (54.23 ha)
- Built: c. 1800
- Architectural style: Mid-19th century
- MPS: Farmsteads of Pittstown, New York MPS
- NRHP reference No.: 12000832
- Added to NRHP: October 3, 2012

Cornell–Manchester Farmstead is a historic home and farm located near Hoosick Falls, Rensselaer County, New York. The main house was built between about 1820 and 1840, and consists of a 1 1/2-story, gable roofed frame main block with an adjoining 1 1/2-story, gable roofed block added about 1850. It was remodeled about 1900 and three open Queen Anne style porches were added. Another 1 1/2-story frame house was added to the property about 1860. Also on the property are the contributing tool barn / grain house (c. 1800-1830), pig house (c. 1880-1900), blacksmith's shop (c. 1850-1870), smokehouse (c. 1820-1850), grain house (c. 1880-1900), corn cribs (1957, 1960s), two hay sheds (c. 1940-1950), shed (c. 1940-1950), garage and vehicle shed (c. 1940-1950), hen house (c. 1940–1941, 1962), small pig house (c. 1940), three hen houses (c. 1940), and barn (c. 1900).

It was listed on the National Register of Historic Places in 2012.
