= Henry Koon House =

Historic house in New York, United States

- U.S. National Register of Historic Places
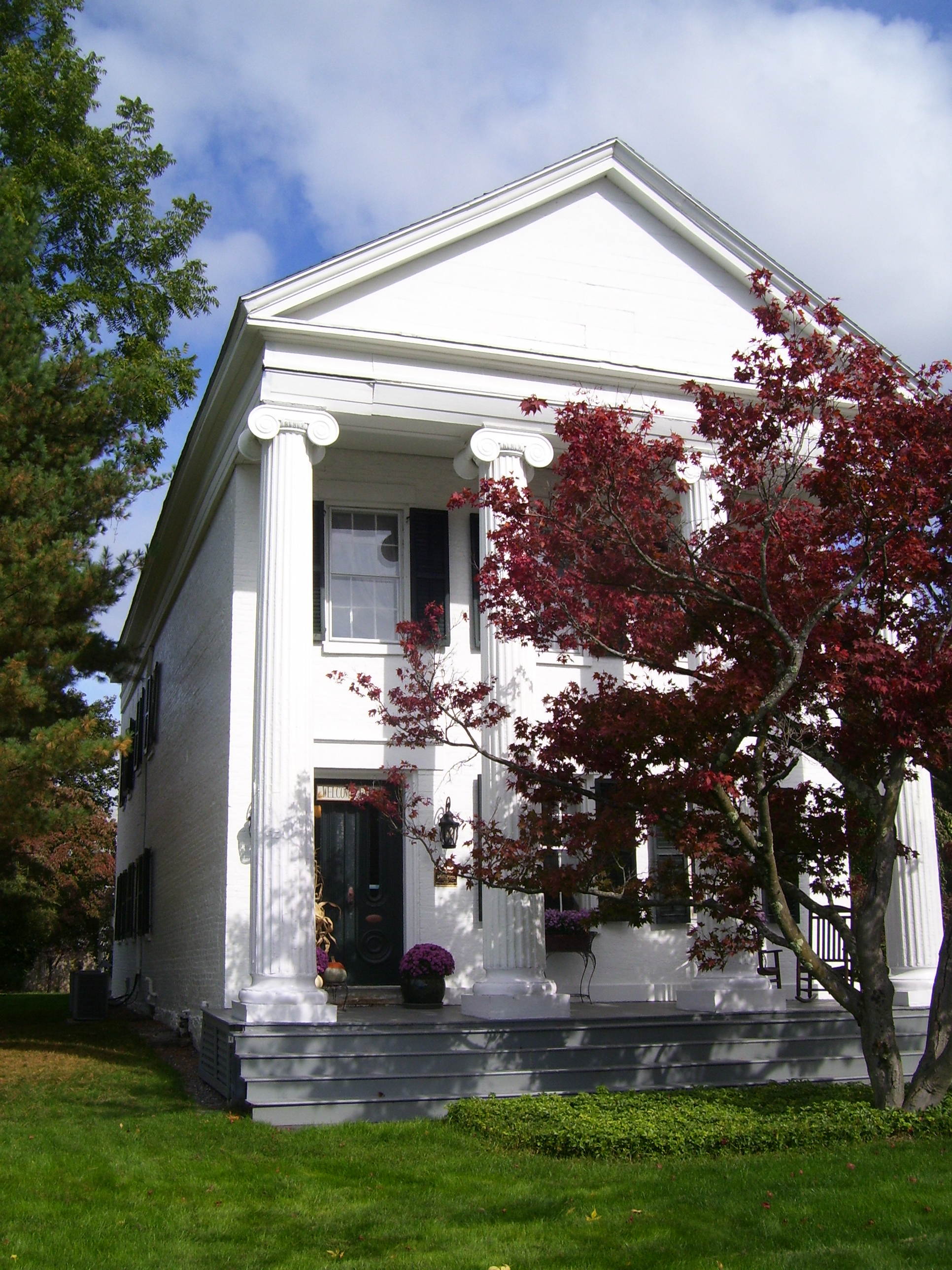

- Location within New York Location within the United States
- Location: 171 Pawling Ave., Troy, New York
- Coordinates: 42°43′0″N 73°40′13″W
- Area: less than one acre
- Built: ca. 1830
- Architectural style: Greek Revival
- NRHP reference No.: 97000112
- Added to NRHP: February 21, 1997

Henry Koon House is a historic home located at Troy in Rensselaer County, New York. It was built about 1830 and is an elegant Greek Revival–style residence. It is a 2-story, three-by-five-bay, side-hall-plan brick dwelling. It features a monumental portico composed of four Ionic order columns supporting a full entablature and pediment.

It was listed on the National Register of Historic Places in 1997.
