= Sherman Farm (Pittstown, New York) =

Historic house in New York, United States

- U.S. National Register of Historic Places
- Location within New York Location within the United States
- Location: 35 Sherman Rd., Pittstown, New York
- Coordinates: 42°51′23″N 73°30′37″W
- Area: 123 acres (50 ha)
- Built: 1797
- Architectural style: Federal
- NRHP reference No.: 03000597
- Added to NRHP: July 5, 2003

Sherman Farm is a historic home and farm complex located at Pittstown Rensselaer County, New York. The complex includes the main house and seven contributing outbuildings. They are a hay barn, wagon barn, corn house, hog bar, ice house, and a barn attached to the hay barn. All were built in the late-18th or early-19th century. the main house was built about 1797 and is a two-story, rectangular frame house with a full attic, full cellar, and high pitched gable roof in the Federal style. A major remodeling about 1840 added some Greek Revival details.

It was listed on the National Register of Historic Places in 2003.
