= Powers Home =

Historic house in New York, United States

- U.S. National Register of Historic Places
- Location within New York Location within the United States
- Location: 819 3rd Ave., Troy, New York
- Coordinates: 42°47′2″N 73°40′22″W
- Area: 1 acre (0.40 ha)
- Built: 1846
- Architectural style: Greek Revival
- NRHP reference No.: 74001298
- Added to NRHP: April 16, 1974

Powers Home, also known as Davenport Homestead, is a historic home located in the Lansingburgh section of Troy in Rensselaer County, New York. It was built in 1846 and is a temple style Greek Revival residence. It is a T-shaped residence with a two-story, three-bay, frame central block with two flanking wings and one long rear wing. The flanking wings were added in 1883–1884. It features a monumental portico composed of four fluted Ionic order columns.

It was listed on the National Register of Historic Places in 1974.
