= Searle, Gardner and Company Cuff and Collar Factory =

- U.S. National Register of Historic Places
- Location within New York Location within the United States
- Location: 701–715 River St., Troy, New York
- Coordinates: 42°44′47″N 73°41′01″W
- Area: 0.57 acres (0.23 ha)
- Built: c. 1898-1899
- Architectural style: Romanesque Revival
- MPS: Textile Factory Buildings in Troy, New York, 1880-1920 MPS
- NRHP reference No.: 13001092
- Added to NRHP: January 15, 2014

Searle, Gardner and Company Cuff and Collar Factory, also known as the Marshall Ray Building, is a historic textile factory located at Troy, Rensselaer County, New York. It was built about 1898–1899, and consists of a five-story, 18 bay wide, rectangular, main block with an attached two-story block. It features segmental arched windows and Romanesque Revival style design elements. The building housed a collar and cuff, and later shirt, manufacturing plant into the mid-1900s.

It was listed on the National Register of Historic Places in 2014.
