= Rensselaer County Historical Society =

Historic Museum, Archive, and Organization in Troy, New York, United States

- Established: 1927
- Location: Troy, NY
- Coordinates: 42°43′46″N 73°41′32″W
- Type: Historic House Museum, Historical Society
- Collection size: 60,000
- Website: www.rchsonline.org

The Rensselaer County Historical Society (RCHS) is a non-profit, historical society and museum, to promote the study of the history of the Rensselaer County, NY. RCHS was founded in 1927, and originally operated out of a single room in the Troy Public Library, collecting manuscripts and published materials related to the county's history. It is located in the Central Troy Historic District, in Troy, NY. The Rensselaer County Historical Society operates a museum, and offers public programs from its location at 57 Second Street, Troy, NY.

== Incorporation ==
RCHS was incorporated to:

1. Promote and encourage historical research,
2. Disseminate a greater knowledge of the early history of that portion of the State of New York known as Rensselaer County,
3. Gather and preserve books, manuscripts, papers and relics relating to the early history of Rensselaer County and the contiguous territory,
4. Suitably mark places of historic interest, and acquire by purchase, gift, devise or otherwise, the title to, or the custody of historic spots and places and to receive gifts, bequests and devises of any kind to be used for the purposes of the incorporation.

== Hart-Cluett Mansion acquisition ==
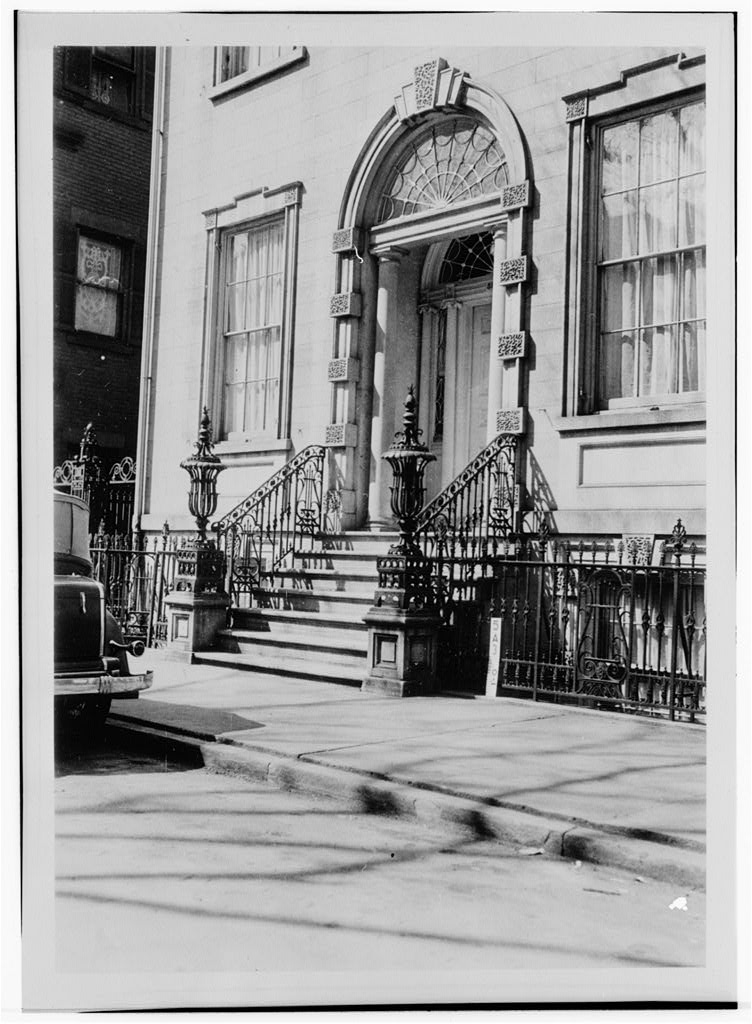
Hart Cluett Mansion Entrance, Historic American Buildings Survey, 1934, RCHS

In 1952, the Hart-Cluett Mansion (1827) was turned over to the Society by Mrs. Cluett to serve as a historic house museum and repository for the county's historical artifacts and archival materials.

In the mid-1950s, the Trustees recruited professional help to create a museum. In 1957, H. Maxson Holloway, formerly a Curator at the New-York Historical Society, was hired as the Society's first director. Holloway's immediate plans included the careful acquisition of fine and decorative arts as well as period furnishings to fill the fourteen rooms of the Hart-Cluett Mansion.

Over the next decade raising money and acquiring objects continued with the highlights of this effort were objects and furnishings from the Hart and Cluett families and their descendants.

== Joseph B. Carr House expansion ==
By the mid-1970s, the Rensselaer County Historical Society had outgrown the Hart-Cluett Mansion and the associated Carriage House. Growth of the collections and demands for programs had outpaced the building's space.

In 1976, the RCHS acquired the Carr House (1838), the building to the north of the Museum. RCHS undertook a capital campaign to begin making it into an educational and administrative center. The first phase of the 57 Second Street project was finished in 1982, providing a meeting room, gift shop and temporary exhibition gallery on the first floor of the building.

=== Carr House renovations ===
In 1995 the New York State Council of the Arts funded an initiative to look at how RCHS manages its collections, to undertake the first computerized inventory of collections, to assess storage needs with an eye to making collections more accessible to the public, and to develop a set of collecting themes that would help to assess current collections and direct future collecting.

In October 2001, RCHS opened a renovated Carr Building. To support the extensive renovation, $2.7 million was raised from individuals, corporations and state grants, to create new galleries and collections storage space, install new environmental systems, consolidate staff offices, and fully renovate the Carriage House.

== Collections and museum ==
RCHS is the primary collecting institution in Rensselaer County and contains in its museum collections approximately 60,000 objects ranging from the fine to the domestic arts. Items represent the history of Troy, the largest urban center in the county, and Rensselaer County at large, and include information about the city's families and buildings.

Troy and Rensselaer County were major contributors to the growth of the United States in the 19th century and one of the primary sites of the American Industrial Revolution. The prominence of the area was due to the influence that the iron, steel and textile industries created. Foundries produced vital products for growth and expansion of the United States westward.

In the 19th and 20th centuries, Troy's garment industries produced over 90% of America's detachable collars and many of its finest shirts.

The museum collections are also closely connected to RCHS's research library collections which include, in part, personal, organizational and business records, photographs, maps, ephemera, etc., as well as the largest collection of secondary resource material on the county's history.

== Collections ==
The RCHS has over 60,000 artifacts, documents, and photographs in its collection. RCHS also houses archives and records for a number of community organizations such as local YMCA, and Troy Chromatics. These collections are used in programs such as the "Historians in Training Programs" conducted with schools in Rensselaer County. The collection has been used in by Charles Osgood for his program CBS Sunday Morning and have been used by Ken Burns, The History Channel, and other media and publishing outlets.

=== Highlights of the collection ===
- Uncle Sam Collection - archeological artifacts from the Congress Street dig at the Samuel Wilson home. A mural by George Gray (1937) and a variety of other materials of other research objects and materials relating to Uncle Sam.
- American Civil War Collection - Rice Cook Bull Diary, county military uniforms and artifacts, photographs, personal accounts, 1863 Draft Riot collection.
- Rensselaer County Surrogate Court Records - estate files for over 30,000 residents of the county between 1791 and 1915 used for genealogy and other historical research projects.
- Burden Iron Works Archives - documents the company's impact worldwide from this 19th-century manufacturing company.
- Photographic Collection - 10,000 images of people, places, events from the early 1840s to the early 2000s.
- Hart and Cluett Family Records - records and artifacts extensively documenting the Hart-Cluett Mansion, including the Howard-Hart Coach, and Cluett Sleigh.
- View of Glass Lake by Joseph Henry Hidley (1830–1872), a folk artist and landscape painter.
- Historical Clothing and textiles, furniture and decorative art objects, tools, stoves and cast iron collection, dating from the late 18th century to present.
- Maps, city and county directories, cemetery records, church records, community organization archives, county home records and numerous other newspapers, and records.

=== Collection use ===
The collection has been extensively used for education, by artists, and as primary source materials in numerous productions.

Among the uses have been:

- Curriculum-based RCHS education programs and adult programs focused on Underground Railroad, Women Suffrage, community studies, labor history, etc.
- Primary Research Sources for academic research, family history projects, architecture and historic preservation, public service commission project background studies, environmental impact studies.
- Inspiration for art projects by artists such as Len Tantillo, Wren Panzella, Mark Priest, Jim Flosdorf and others.
- Primary Sources for children's books, elementary and high school text books, historical novels and plays, the New York State Encyclopedia, Blizzard of 1888, etc.
- A variety of film and TV projects including, Martin Scorsese's The Age of Innocence, Ken Burns' Civil War and Baseball Programs, C-SPAN's Underground Railroad and Uncle Sam productions, and Bill Moyers' The Hudson River, CBS Sunday Morning's Uncle Sam program, and numerous other programs and films.

== Operations ==
RCHS uses its humanities collections in a number of ways to promote broad public participation and interest in the history of Rensselaer County. Collections-based exhibitions are focus of the RCHS exhibits, and public programs. RCHS uses artifacts from its collection to demonstrate how they are made, how they are used, how they express human needs and values, and how they influence society and the lives of individuals.

== See also ==
- List of historical societies in New York (state)
