= Albany Avenue Historic District =

Historic district in New York, United States

- U.S. National Register of Historic Places
- U.S. Historic district
- Location within New York Location within the United States
- Nearest city: Nassau, New York
- Coordinates: 42°31′1″N 73°36′55″W
- Area: 14 acres (5.7 ha)
- Architectural style: Greek Revival, Federal
- NRHP reference No.: 78001902
- Added to NRHP: November 21, 1978

Albany Avenue Historic District is a national historic district located at Nassau in Rensselaer County, New York. It consists of 10 contributing buildings. They date from about 1800 to about 1920 and include seven Federal styles residences, two early 20th century residences, and one Greek Revival temple-style residence.

It was listed on the National Register of Historic Places in 1978.
