= Thomas–Wiley–Johnson Farmstead =

- U.S. National Register of Historic Places
- Location within New York Location within the United States
- Location: 703 Johnsonville Rd., near Johnsonville, New York
- Coordinates: 42°52′19″N 73°29′52″W
- Area: 171.02 acres (69.21 ha)
- Built: c. 1790-1800
- Architectural style: Greek Revival
- MPS: Farmsteads of Pittstown, New York MPS
- NRHP reference No.: 12000798
- Added to NRHP: September 19, 2012

Thomas–Wiley–Johnson Farmstead is a historic home and farm located near Johnsonville, Rensselaer County, New York. The farmhouse was built between about 1790 and 1800, and consists of a two-story, five-bay, Greek Revival style frame main block with a kitchen wing added c. 1840. It was remodeled about 1870, and has another wing added about the same time. Also on the property are the contributing main barn group with cow barn and milk house additions (c. 1860-1960), hen house and corn crib (c. 1930, c. 1950), work shop (c. 1880-1900), and garage (c. 1950).

It was listed on the National Register of Historic Places in 2012.
