= United Waste Manufacturing Company Building =

- U.S. National Register of Historic Places
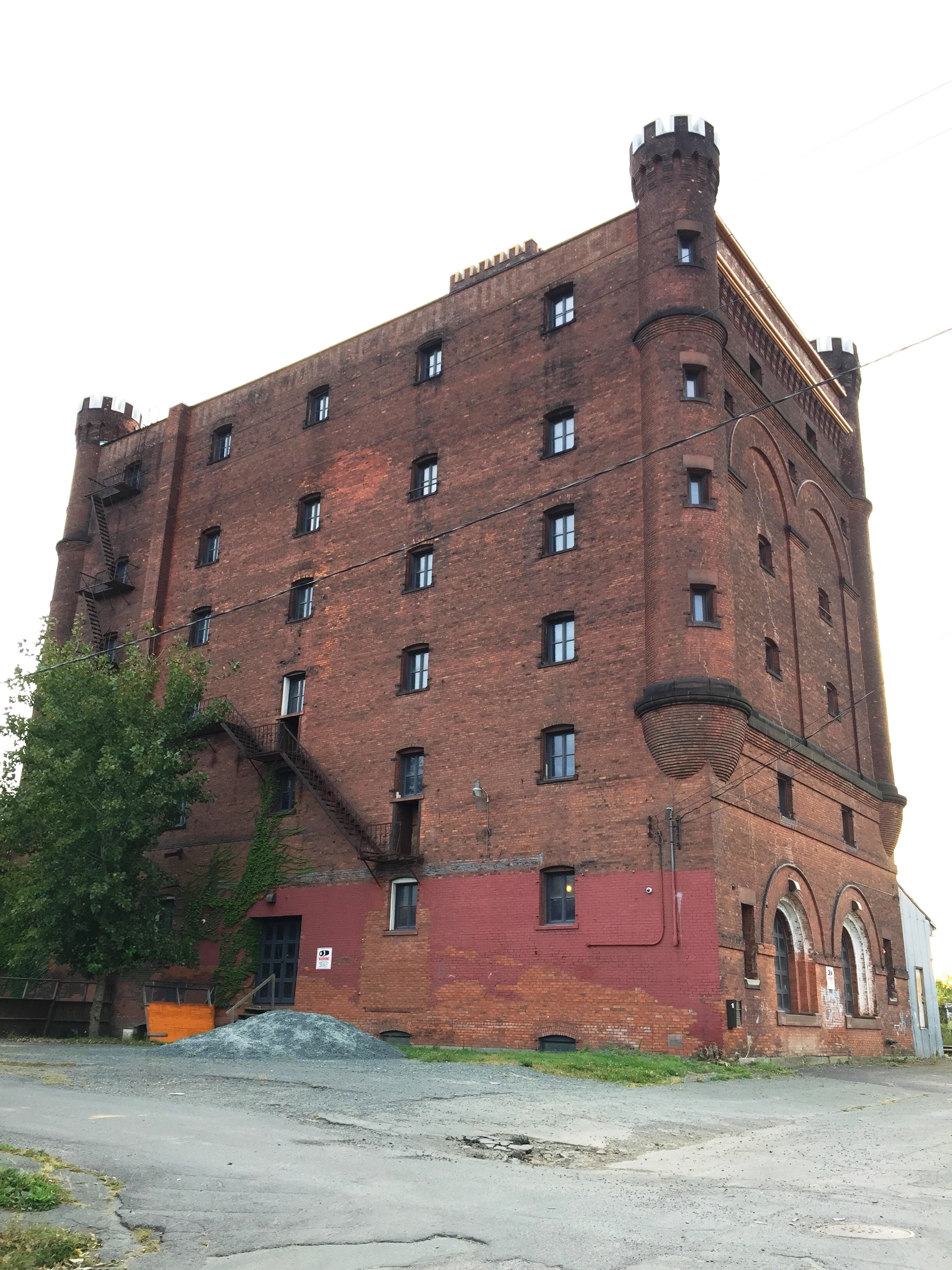

- Location within New York Location within the United States
- Location: 1 Jackson St., Troy, New York
- Coordinates: 42°42′57″N 73°41′46″W
- Area: 0.30 acres (0.12 ha)
- Built: c. 1902
- Architectural style: Romanesque
- NRHP reference No.: 13000054
- Added to NRHP: March 6, 2013

United Waste Manufacturing Company Building, also known as the Hudson River Terminal Warehouse Company and "The Fortress", is a historic warehouse building located at Troy, Rensselaer County, New York. It was built about 1902, and is a six-story, load bearing masonry building in the Romanesque Revival style. It features castellated detailing, three blind arcades, crenellated corner towers, and a prominent main tower that resembles castle keep.

It was listed on the National Register of Historic Places in 2013.
