= St. Barnabas Episcopal Church (Troy, New York) =

Historic church in New York, United States

- U.S. National Register of Historic Places
- Location within New York Location within the United States
- Location: 2900 Fifth Ave., Troy, New York
- Coordinates: 42°44′46″N 73°40′58″W
- Area: less than one acre
- Built: 1895
- Architectural style: Late Gothic Revival
- NRHP reference No.: 03001517
- Added to NRHP: January 28, 2004

St. Barnabas Episcopal Church, later called Christ & St. Barnabas Episcopal Church, and now known as New Hope Missionary Baptist Church, is an historic Episcopal church and rectory at 2900 Fifth Avenue in Troy, Rensselaer County, New York. The church was built in 1895 and is a red brick church in the Late Gothic Revival style. It has a gable roof and three hipped dormers. It has an open bell tower and slender conical turrets. It features a rose window depicting the Madonna and Child. The former rectory is a 2 1/2-story, L-shaped brick residence. Also on the property is a contributing carved stone crucifixion dated to about 1900.

It was listed on the National Register of Historic Places in 2004.
