= Johnsonville, New York =

Johnsonville
- Hamlet
- Location of Johnsonville in New York
- Coordinates: 42°54′50″N 73°30′51″W
- Country: United States
- State: New York
- County: Rensselaer
- ZIP code: 12094
- Area code: 518

Johnsonville is a hamlet located in the towns of Pittstown and Schaghticoke in Rensselaer County, New York, United States. It was named for its settler, William Johnson.

== History ==
Perspective map of Johnsonville from 1887 by L.R. Burleigh with list of landmarks

Johnsonville was home to Johnsonville Axe Manufacturing company and a bobbin factory (Johnsonville Bobbin Works) in the late 19th century.

The Baum–Wallis Farmstead, Cannon–Brownell–Herrington Farmstead, and Thomas–Wiley–Johnson Farmstead are listed on the National Register of Historic Places. All three of these properties are located on the plateau south of the Hoosic River, all more than five miles distant from Johnsonville.
