= Zwack (surname) =

Zwack is a surname. Notable people with the surname include:

- Henry F. Zwack (born 1952), American lawyer and politician
- Karl Zwack, Austrian pair skater
- Michael Zwack (1949–2017), American artist
- Péter Zwack (1927–2012), Hungarian businessman, investor, philanthropist, and diplomat
- Peter B. Zwack, American general
