= Craver Farmstead =

Historic house in New York, United States

- U.S. National Register of Historic Places
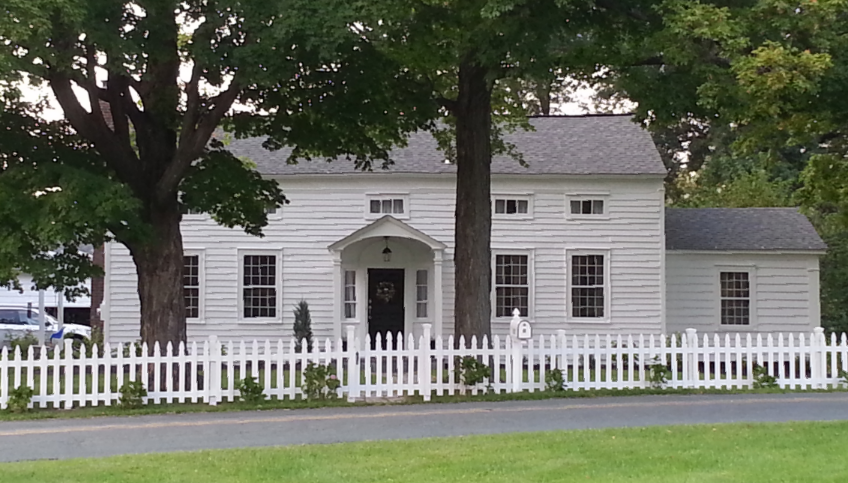
- Craver Farmstead 2014 (225th Anniversary)

- Location within New York Location within the United States
- Location: 115 Craver Rd., East Greenbush, New York
- Coordinates: 42°37′23″N 73°38′37″W
- Area: 40 acres (16 ha)
- Built: 1790
- Architectural style: Federal
- NRHP reference No.: 96001423
- Added to NRHP: December 16, 1996

The Craver Farmstead was established circa 1790 consisting of 225 acres with a farmhouse and a barn. Today, the Craver Farmstead is both architecturally and historically significant. The farmhouse was built prior to 1790 and stands as one of the oldest and best preserved examples of Federal-style architecture in upstate New York. The Federal style evolved as the dominant classicizing architecture in North America between 1780 and 1830 as the new republic of the United States sought to define itself as independent in literature, art, and architecture just as it was politically.

Craver Farmstead is located on Craver Road in southern Rensselaer County, New York at the northeast corner of the town of East Greenbush, NY near the hamlet of West Sand Lake, NY. The one-mile county road bearing the site's name ("Craver Road") stretches across the original historic site to connect two more recently developed roadways. Historians agree that Craver Road was at first simply a horse trail leading to the then-new farmhouse during the mid-to-late 18th century. Soon afterward, Craver Road became a personal carriageway for the Craver Family as one may think of the modern driveway. The barn located at Craver Farmstead originally served as a private draft horse stable and carriage house for the exclusive use of the Craver family far prior to the advent of the horseless carriage.

Historically, the Craver Farmstead represents the agricultural heritage of 18th and 19th century rural New York. It serves as a landmark of the region's agrarian past as well as a tangible link to the hardy folks who settled upstate New York.

The Craver Farmstead is listed on the National Register of Historic Places as certified by the U.S. Department of the Interior.

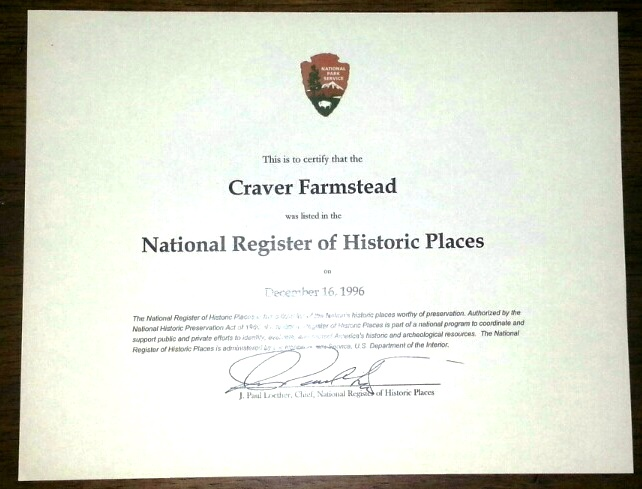

== Farmhouse ==
The Craver farmhouse is an example of the Federal style of architecture. The Craver farmhouse reflects the type of home in which generations of upstate New York farming families resided and retains integrity of location, feeling, association, materials, and craftsmanship.

In the spirit of Federal-style architecture, the Craver farmhouse is characterized by balance and symmetry in design, lightness and elegance in mood, and delicacy and finesse in execution. It retains a high level of historic integrity with its original fenestration and fabric largely intact. The house is a five-bay center-entrance building. It is a two-story side-gabled dwelling of post-and-beam construction with cedar clapboard siding. The front entrance features a gabled porch with a vaulted ceiling and sidelights composed of three vertical panes. The doors and windows of are in strict symmetry. The front windows feature twelve-over-twelve double-hung sashes, original shutter mounts and simple surrounds. The farmhouse has flush raking eaves and five frieze windows across the front.

The interior of the Craver farmhouse contains graceful decorative ornament, including a hand-carved wooden fireplace mantel featuring Federal detailing. Board and batten doors with wrought iron hardware are featured in rooms throughout the home. An open balustrade staircase leads to the upper level, which features the original wide pine plank flooring. The walls throughout the house are mostly plaster and contain lath, both sawed and split.

The farmhouse faces south, standing over a one-room deep hand-dug earth basement with a bedrock floor. The house is supported by a stone-rubble foundation featuring original hand-hewn beams. It stands on the north side of Craver Road, flanked by a quarter-acre pond to the west, a large 19th-century heavy timber-frame, English-style barn to the south and a producing apple orchard to the east. An old stone fence runs in an east–west direction on the northern boundary of the property.

The remnants of one stone and mortar foundation are located about 100 feet east of the barn. There are also remnants of a second stone-and-mortar foundation adjacent to the farmhouse on its northern side which is believed to have once been the site of the kitchen as separated from the main dwelling. The foundations are considered unevaluated archeological resources.

== Barn and stable ==
The barn, with its original slate roof and hand-hewn post and beam construction, is typical English period design with center wagon doors and horizontal clapboarding. It is a side-gabled form. Its long side, or axis, is parallel to a hill. Its appearance is of massiveness and simplicity, with heavy mortised, tenoned and pegged beams. Resting on a stone foundation, the lower level contains remnants of dairy and draft horse stalls, while the upper level appears to have been used for hay storage.

== Agricultural legacy ==
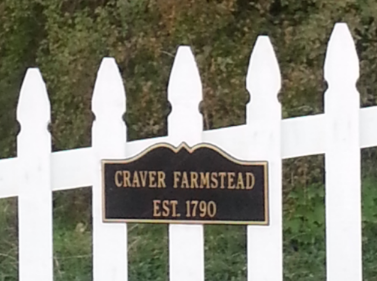

The Craver Farmstead consists of rolling farmland and woodlands. Flora in evidence today including apple trees, asparagus, rhubarb, and climbing roses are believed to result of plantings by previous occupants from 100 to 225 years ago.

The apple orchard at the Craver Farmstead currently produces three varieties. New York State census records from 1875 confirm that the Craver family had hundreds of apple and pear trees in addition to other crops. The existing orchard consists of approximately 30 producing trees and is the only surviving plot of fruit trees planted by the Craver family more than 100 years ago.

== Detailed History ==
=== Background ===
Earliest records of the Craver Farmstead indicate construction of the farmhouse sometime prior to 1790. The home appears on a survey map drawn by Evert Van Alen. Whose comments included the farm being "under good improvement" with a "sufficiency of timber." A lease of same farm, some 225 acres, called "This Indenture," was dated February 1, 1790. The owner was patroon "Stephen Van Rensselaer, Efquire, Proprietor of the Manor of Renffelaerwyck." The tenants were Johannes and Henrick Miller. On the reverse side of the lease appears a rent release dated December 14, 1863, to Peter Reynolds and John W. Craver.

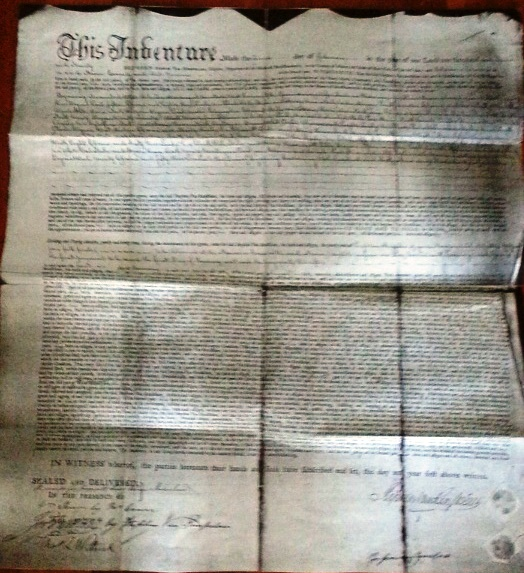

The lease itself carries historical significance. Alexander Hamilton, who was Stephen Van Rensselaer's brother-in-law, designed a lease that bound the new tenants permanently to the estate, thereby adroitly sidestepping the issue of feudalism, which had been outlawed in New York State in 1782. The 1790 “Indenture” which originally created the Craver Farmstead, was such an agreement. Under the terms of the lease, the tenant had to pay all taxes, and was to use the land for agricultural purposes only. The patroon reserved to himself timber, water and mineral rights, and had the right to enter the tenant's property to exploit those resources. The tenant couldn't sell his property, but only the lease, to another. If he wished to sell the "quarter sale clause" restricted the tenant further, by Van Rensselaer having the option of collecting one-fourth of the sale price or taking full title to the property by paying three-quarters of the market price. In the 1790 lease The Millers agreed to a yearly rent of 24 1/2 skipples of winter wheat, four fat fowls, and one day's service with carriage and horses, due on January first of each year.

By 1797 the original leased property had been transferred to and divided into two 112.5 acre parcels by William and Henry Coon, the Craver farmstead standing on the William Coon portion. On November 6, 1841, Elizabeth Craver, having inherited the property from her late husband, William Coon, for consideration of $50, signed over her interest in the farm to her son John W. Craver (she had been remarried to William Craver in 1799), whose family owned the Craver farmstead longer than any other tenant or owner.

=== The Craver Years ===
John W. Craver was born in Rensselaer County, New York on March 6, 1801, and resided in the Craver farmhouse his entire life. By 1830 Craver, had married and together with his wife Catharine, had two daughters, Almira and Emily, who grew up on the Craver Farmstead. By 1855, New York State Census records indicate that Craver was the 54-year-old head of a six-member family. On April 3, 1855, during the first annual Clinton (now East Greenbush) Town Meeting, held at the home of William R. DeFreest, Craver was elected as an "Overseer of the Poor". Overseers of the Poor were responsible for assisting people in need, supervising admissions to the Poor House, and certifying that freed slaves were capable of caring for themselves.

By 1875, Craver was a widower, 74 years old, and farmed 112 acres, 90 of which were improved, 29 plowed, 24 pasture, and 20 meadow. Craver produced hay, oats, rye, corn and potatoes. He cultivated 150 apple and 100 pear trees (the descendants of which are in evidence today) and strawberries. He raised livestock, including cattle, horses, poultry and pigs. Craver Farmstead produce included butter, eggs, pork, and cider. In 1874, on only 90 acres of improved farmland, Craver had grown 16 acres of oats, 4 of Indian corn, 16 of winter rye, and 8 of potatoes, which yielded 400 bushels of oats, 75 of corn, 190 of rye, and 750 of potatoes. His 24 acres of pasture accounted for 50 tons of hay. Additionally, 150 apple and 100 pear trees yielded 200 and 30 bushels of fruit, respectively. Farm production included 500 pounds of butter, 400 gallons of milk, 1200 pounds of pork, 8 barrels of cider, and $15 worth of eggs sold. Craver valued his farm at $12000, and the farmstead at $1500. Additional children included Albus, Sylvester, Caroline, Catherine, and Elizabeth. Upon John W. Craver's death on January IS, 1888, intestate, ownership of the Craver farmstead was assumed by Albus, who, on March 6, 1896, passed the property on to his son, Irwin Craver. On April 15, 1929, Irwin died, and willed the property to his surviving wife, Cylvie A. Craver, who sold the Craver farmstead and acreage in 1942.

The Craver Farmstead was accepted for listing on the National Register of Historic Places in 1996.
