= Jon Romano =

American convicted school shooter

- Born: Jon William Romano; October 30, 1987 (age 38)
- Known for: Perpetrating the Columbia High School shooting
- Motive: Suicidal ideation, sexual abuse, depression
- Criminal charges: attempted murder and reckless endangerment
- Penalty: 20 year prison sentence (Released after 17 years on good behavior)

Details
- Date: February 9, 2004
- Locations: Columbia High School, East Greenbush, New York
- Killed: 0
- Injured: 1
- Weapon: Winchester 12-gauge pump-action shotgun

Jon William Romano (born October 30, 1987) is an American convicted school shooter and reformed mental health advocate.

== Early life ==
Romano was born on October 30, 1987 in East Greenbush, New York. His father left the family when Romano was four years old. He alleges that, as a child, he was beaten by his father.

== Shooting and incarceration ==
On February 9, 2004, Romano, a Columbia High School student, walked into school with a Winchester 12-gauge pump-action shotgun. He passed by the main office and ascended stairs to a second-floor bathroom, where he hid inside a stall and sent text messages to his friends such as "I'm in school with shotgun, get out." Romano then washed his hands, then stepped out into a hallway and fired two shots before he was tackled from behind by school assistant principal John Sawchuk. During the ensuing struggle, a third shot was fired that struck the leg of special education teacher Michael Bennett. Romano was subdued and restrained until police arrived and he was arrested.

Romano was charged with three counts of attempted murder in the second degree, one count of assault in the second degree, and 82 counts of reckless endangerment in the first degree. He accepted a plea agreement from the prosecution and was sentenced to 20 years in prison followed by a five-year period of post-release supervision.

He wrote a series of letters during his incarceration that advocated against gun violence. After the 2018 Parkland high school shooting, he wrote that the survivors were "courageous and inspiring for demanding action from politicians". On February 21, 2018, the Albany Times Union published a column featuring comments from Sawchuk. Romano responded with a letter thanking Sawchuk for stopping him before he could hurt himself or others.

Romano was released on December 15, 2020 after serving seventeen years of his 20-year sentence.

== After release ==
=== Sword attack ===
On 29 August 2022, Romano was attacked with a sword and critically injured while working at a homeless shelter in Albany, New York. Randell D. Mason, a 42 year old homeless man was subsequently arrested and charged with attempted second-degree murder. The attack occurred when Romano tried to have Mason removed from the shelter for using insulting language, at which point Mason yelled "Fucking white devil!" and charged at Romano with the sword, hacking at both his legs. Romano received urgent treatment to reattach multiple limbs. In April 2023, Mason was found guilty and sentenced to 25 years imprisonment on the charge.

=== Social media ===
In early 2022, Romano made a social media account on the streaming platform TikTok. The account quickly gained a following due to his criminal notoriety. As attention to his social media presence grew, a significant amount of backlash from other influencers on the platform, many of whom claimed it was an attempt to monetize the notoriety gained from his violent crimes. In late 2022, Romano announced that he would no longer be participating on the platform due to the amount of negative and abusive comments he received.

As of 2026, Romano actively posts on TikTok and has a following of over 250,000 followers.
