= John Carner Jr. House =

Historic house in New York, United States

- U.S. National Register of Historic Places
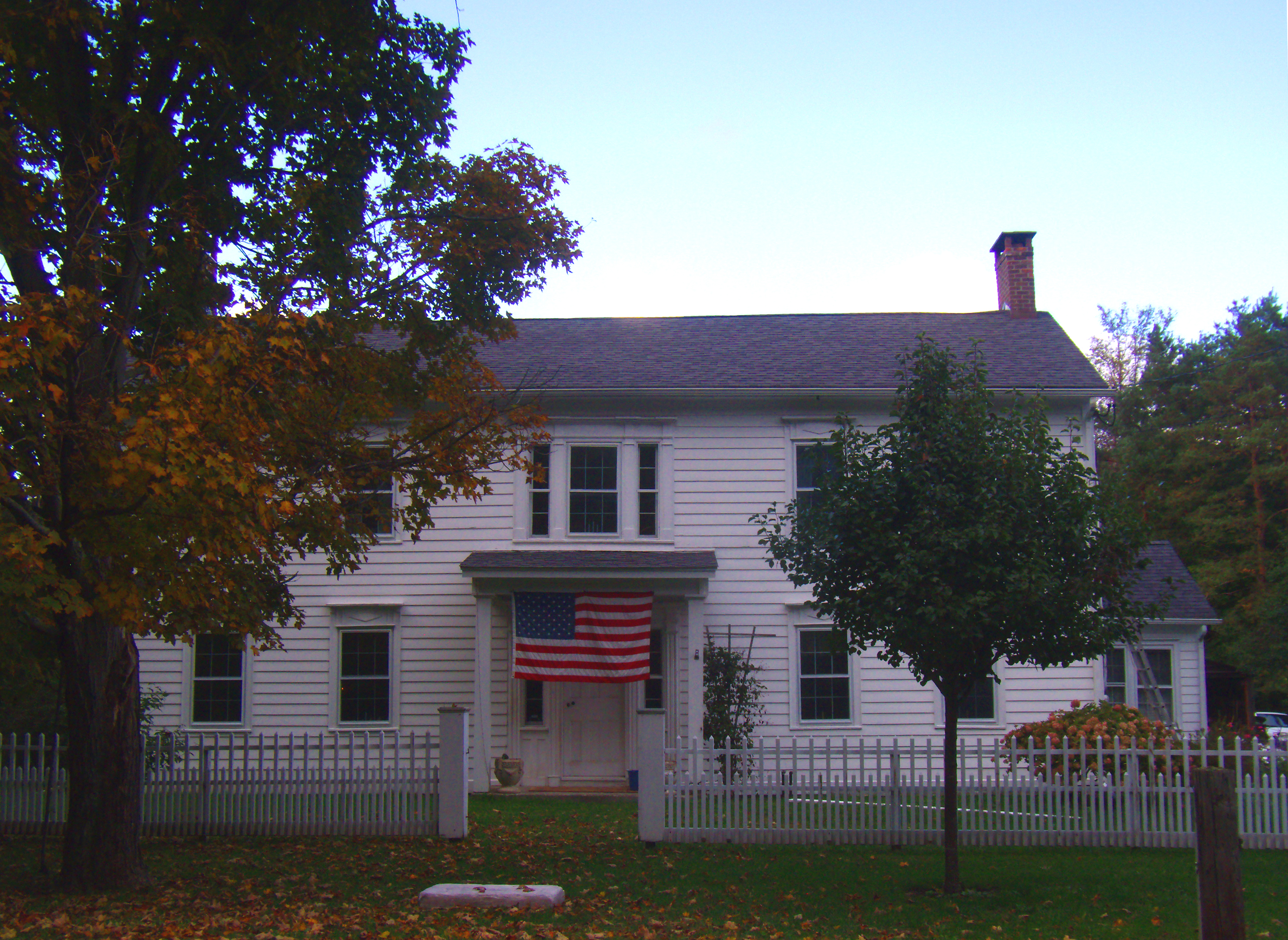

- Location within New York Location within the United States
- Location: 1310 Best Rd., East Greenbush, New York
- Coordinates: 42°37′50″N 73°39′58″W
- Area: 10 acres (4.0 ha)
- Built: 1800
- Architectural style: Federal
- NRHP reference No.: 03001399
- Added to NRHP: January 16, 2004

The John Carner Jr. House is a historic house located at 1310 Best Road in East Greenbush, Rensselaer County, New York.

== Description and history ==
The house was built in about 1800 and is a two-story, five-bay wide, two-bay deep, heavy timber-framed dwelling designed in the Federal style. It is sheathed in clapboards and is topped by a medium pitched gable roof. It has a two-story rear kitchen wing, believed to be an earlier structure incorporated into the newly built house. It was last modified in the 1930s. Also on the property is a contributing three-bay English barn, two smaller barns, a potting shed, a corn crib, and a well house.

It was listed on the National Register of Historic Places on January 16, 2004.
