= East Greenbush Community Library =

- 42°37′8.8″N 73°41′43.9″W
- Location: 10 Community Way, East Greenbush, New York 12061
- Established: Chartered in 1988

Access and use
- Population served: 15,560 (plus contracted users)

Other information
- Budget: $1,750,000
- Website: eglibrary.org

The East Greenbush Community Library serves a chartered special district, including the town of East Greenbush, New York and portions of the town of Schodack, New York under contract, bringing the total number of patrons to nearly 30,000. The library is also a member of the Upper Hudson Library System, a resource-sharing consortium consisting of the 36 public libraries in Albany and Rensselaer Counties. Located in southern Rensselaer County, New York, off Route 151 (Luther Road), the library shares a 39-acre tract of former farmland with the YMCA and Hawthorne Ridge, a multi-use senior housing complex. The East Greenbush Community Library is a busy suburban library with 12 public computers, four meeting rooms and programming for all ages. In 2024, 236,471 people visited the library in person and online. The “Friends of the Library” volunteer group runs book sales each year as well as an ongoing book sale within the library, supporting the library’s collection and programming.

== History ==
Originally, library services in East Greenbush were provided by two “association” libraries that opened in the 1940s. The Katherine Wirth Memorial Library was located in the basement of the Clinton Heights School (now the East Greenbush Town Hall) and the other was located in the Bates Building on Columbia Turnpike. In 1974 the two merged, with the main branch located in the Bates Building. In 1984, the collection was unified and moved to a 2,670 square foot area of the Town Hall. In 1988, residents voted in favor of creating a taxing district for the library that made it a true town library. Today, residents vote directly on the library budget and the governing Board of Trustees.

== Building Construction ==
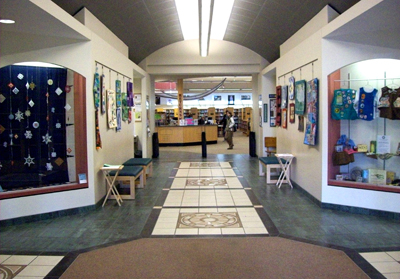
Library Interior

By 1995, it had become evident that the library needed more space, and the long process of building the library’s present site began. The architectural firm of Lepera and Ward designed a 2.45 million dollar project with 20,000 square feet of space on 10 acres. Ground-breaking ceremonies were held on June 6, 2000, and the new library celebrated its grand opening on March 4, 2001.

The library’s design includes high ceilings, exposed trusses, and towering windows, creating a bright and inviting space. The separate Youth Services area is where children can play, read, use computers, and find books, music, videos and games. Recently, another room was designated as a space for an active teen and “tween” population.

== Special collections ==
Special collections include Local History, Literacy, Education and Career Guidance and Parenting. Some of the services offered by the library include: downloadable e-books and audiobooks, movie and video game lending, children’s programming, free introductory computer instruction, defensive driving classes, storytelling, musical/stage productions, free movie showings for both children and adults, museum passes, public scanner/copier and fax, public computers and Wi-Fi, tax forms, inter-library loan, Books by Mail, and outreach to special populations.
