= Josh Beekman =

American football player and coach (born 1983)

Current position
- Title: Director of Football Initiatives
- Team: Boston College
- Conference: Atlantic Coast Conference

Biographical details
- Born: June 30, 1983 (age 43); Amsterdam, New York, U.S.
- Education: Boston College

Playing career
- 2003–06: Boston College
- 2007–10: Chicago Bears
- 2010: Florida Tuskers
- 2011: Indianapolis Colts (offseason/practice only)
- 2012: Jacksonville Jaguars
- Position: Offensive lineman

Coaching career (HC unless noted)
- 2012: Eastern Kentucky (GA) (offseason)
- 2013–2015: FIU (GA)
- 2016: Concord (OL)
- 2017: Garden City (OL)

Accomplishments and honors

Awards
- First-team All-American (2006); First-team All-ACC (2006); Second-team All-ACC (2005)

Josh Beekman (born June 30, 1983) is currently the Director of Football Initiatives at Boston College and a former guard in the National Football League (NFL). He played high school football in his hometown of Amsterdam, New York. He played college football at Boston College. Beekman was selected by the Chicago Bears in the fourth round of the 2007 NFL draft and spent three seasons with the team. He was a member of the Florida Tuskers of the United Football League (UFL) and the Indianapolis Colts following his tenure with the Bears.

Beekman signed with the Jacksonville Jaguars on August 12, 2012 and he was on the active roster at the beginning of the season. He was released on September 12, 2012.

== College career ==
Beekman was a decorated offensive guard for Boston College from 2002 to 2006 and he started 37 straight games for the Eagles from 2004 to 2006. As a senior team captain, Beekman earned Associated Press First-team All-America honors and he was also the receipt of the 2006 Jacobs Blocking Trophy for the most valuable blocker in the Atlantic Coast Conference, where he was First-team All-Conference in 2006.

He won the 2006 Scanlan Award an award given by the Boston College Varsity Club Award to the senior football player outstanding in scholarship, leadership, and athletic ability.

Off the field, Beekman also played an active role in the community and often attended charity events during his college tenure.

== Professional career ==
Pre-draft measurables
Height	Weight	Arm length	Hand span	40-yard dash	10-yard split	20-yard split	20-yard shuttle	Three-cone drill	Vertical jump	Broad jump	Bench press
6 ft 1 5/8 in (1.87 m)	313 lb (142 kg)	32 1/2 in (0.83 m)	9 1/2 in (0.24 m)	5.43 s	1.86 s	3.06 s	4.81 s	8.24 s	25.5 in (0.65 m)	7 ft 9 in (2.36 m)	24 reps
All values from NFL Combine

=== Chicago Bears ===
Beekman was drafted by the Chicago Bears in the fourth round (130th overall) of the 2007 NFL draft and went on to play three years for the Bears where he started 20 games in total.

In 2008, Beekman started all 16 regular season games at left guard and he was one of the members of the Bears offensive line that had the same 5 starters for the entire season, one of just 6 teams in the NFL to accomplish that feat in that year.

=== Florida Tuskers ===
After being released by the Chicago Bears in September 2010, Beekman became a member of the Florida Tuskers of the United Football League and the Tuskers played in the 2010 UFL Championship Game.

=== Indianapolis Colts ===
Beekman was signed by the Indianapolis Colts in August 2011. He was released before the beginning of the season.

=== Jacksonville Jaguars ===
Beekman was signed by the Jacksonville Jaguars in August 2012. He was on the active roster at the beginning of the season, but was released on September 12, 2012.

== Coaching career ==
Beekman was an intern strength and conditioning coach at Boston College from January to May 2011.

Beekman joined Eastern Kentucky University football staff in the spring of 2012 as the graduate assistant offensive line coach and spent the offseason at EKU. He also had an internship with the Miami Dolphins in June 2012.

In Spring 2013, Beekman was hired by head coach Ron Turner to be Florida International University's graduate assistant offensive line coach.

In March 2016, Beekman was hired by head coach Paul Price to be Concord University's offensive line coach. In 2016, as his first year of being the offensive line coach, two offensive linemen of Concord University, Coleman Osborne and Paul Smith, were named to the first-team of the All-MEC Team.

== Personal life ==
Beekman graduated from Boston College with a bachelor's degree in history and a master's degree in administrative studies. He also obtained a master's degree in sports management from Florida International University while he worked there as a football GA.

Beekman is a devout Christian. He and his wife were married since 2009.
