= Hudson Valley Community College =

Public college in Troy, New York, US

- Former names: Troy Technical Institute; Hudson Valley Technical Institute
- Motto: "Be Bold. Be a Viking."
- Type: Public community college
- Established: 1953; 73 years ago
- Parent institution: State University of New York
- President: Michael Brophy
- Undergraduates: 9,809 (fall 2025)
- Location: Troy, New York, United States; 42.69578°N 73.68354°W
- Campus: Suburban 120 acres (0.49 km^{2})
- Colors: Hunter green and white
- Nickname: Vikings
- Sporting affiliations: National Junior College Athletic Association, Region III, Mountain Valley Athletic Conference
- Mascot: Victor the Viking
- Website: www.hvcc.edu

Hudson Valley Community College is a public community college in Troy, New York. It is part of the State University of New York (SUNY). Although about eighty percent of the students are from the Capital District, the remainder are from other parts of New York, other states and from some 30 countries around the world.

The college is accredited by the Middle States Commission on Higher Education and is overseen by a 10-member Board of Trustees.

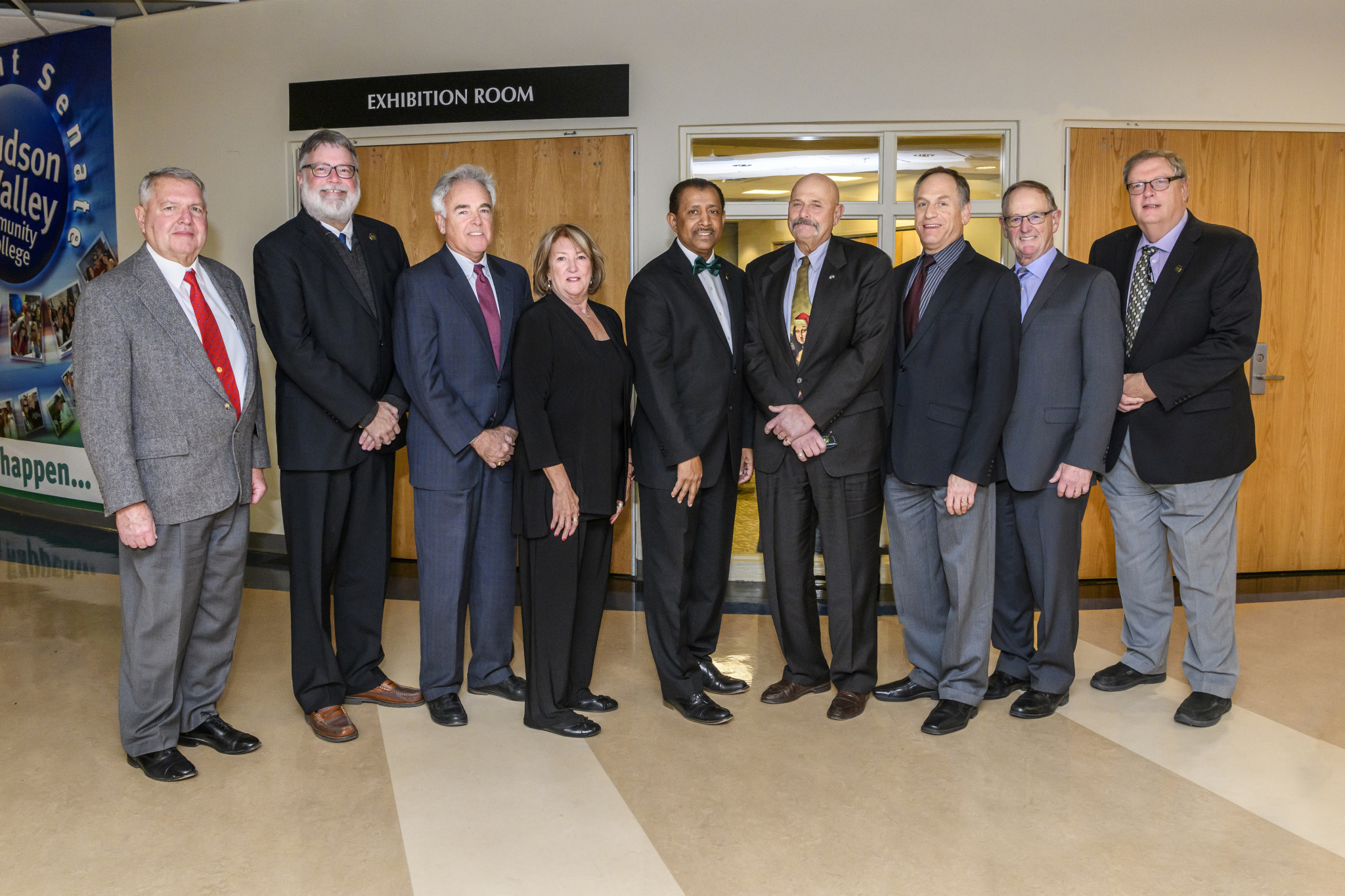
HVCC Board of Trustees 2020

== History ==
The roots of HVCC are in the Veteran's Vocational School in downtown Troy, set up in 1946 to provide high school level instruction to returning veterans of World War II. Hyman Rosenblum, an Albany businessman, helped persuade Rensselaer County officials that a community college would benefit residents and be worth the money; Rosenblum was on the college's Board of Trustees from 1953 to 1957, becoming the board's secretary from 1957 until his death in 1996; Rosenblum was also one of the founders of what would become the media company Capital Cities/ABC. In order to provide college-level instruction to veterans among others, the college was founded in 1953 as the Hudson Valley Technical Institute, providing five vocational training programs; it was initially housed in the former Earl and Wilson shirt collar factory building on the corner of Seventh Avenue and Broadway. Dwight Marvin, editor of the Troy Record, was one of several community leaders who pressed to create a broader mission for the college; Marvin served as the first chairman of the college's Board of Trustees.

By 1955, the board of trustees was already looking for a larger location to site a campus, with trustees surveying likely sites. The new campus was initially opposed by a group of Rensselaer County taxpayers, who argued that the county should not have to pay for half the cost of the campus construction if fewer than half the students were county residents. What would become a landmark case for community colleges in New York State eventually was heard by the state's Court of Appeals.Grimm v. Rensselaer County,, 171 N.Y.S.2d 491. On June 25, 1958, the court upheld the county's right to fund half of the cost of construction and paved the way for capital construction at community colleges around the state.Grimm v. Rensselaer County, 4 N.Y.S.2d 416.

In 1959, at Rosenblum's suggestion, the college changed its name to Hudson Valley Community College.

The new campus, with five Indiana limestone buildings, was completed in 1961 and the former factory building was abandoned and eventually torn down.

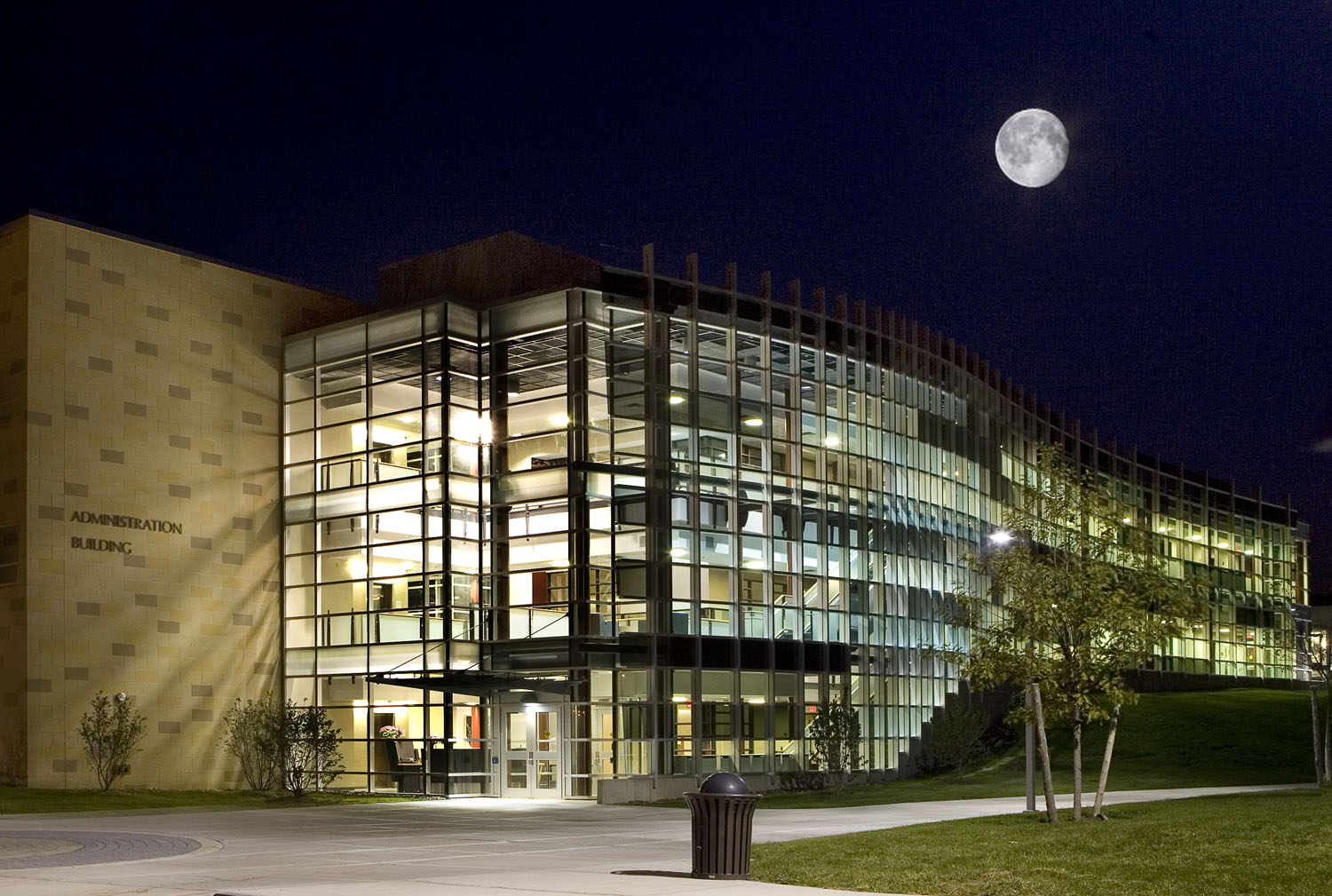
Hudson Valley Community College Administration Building, main campus

=== Growth in the 21st century ===
A $47.4 million, 100,000-square-foot science center on campus was completed in the fall of 2013. The building houses laboratory and classroom space for the college's science programs and support degree offerings in biological sciences, biotechnology, physical science and environmental science. Equipment and processes available to students include high-performance liquid chromatography and mass spectroscopy; confocal microscopes; flow cytometers and sorters, advanced digital microscopy; DNA sequencers; real-time PCR detection systems; and automated protein/RNA electrophoresis.

In fall 2019, the college opened the $14.5 million, 37,000 square foot Gene F. Haas Center for Advanced Manufacturing Skills. The center will allow the college to grow enrollment in its Advanced Manufacturing Technology degree program and meet an urgent workforce demand for skilled employees in the region.

=== College presidents ===
The college has had eight presidents:

- Otto V. Guenther, 1953–1965: Otto Guenther was selected in 1953 to be the first president of the newly established Hudson Valley Technical Institute. In 1957, Guenther received approval from the Rensselaer County Board of Supervisors to begin construction of a new campus on the border of Troy and the town of North Greenbush. That transition to a newly created suburban campus and the growth of the student body were Guenther's legacy as president.
- James J. Fitzgibbons, 1965–1979: James Fitzgibbons presided over growth in the college's student body and in the number of academic programs offered. During his tenure, Hudson Valley's curricula grew from 18 to 38 academic programs. Five new buildings on campus also were completed during the Fitzgibbons presidency. The Fitzgibbons Health Technologies Center was dedicated to the president in 1982.
- Joseph J. Bulmer, 1979–1996: The longest-tenured president of the college, Joseph J. Bulmer served Hudson Valley for 17 years. A nuclear engineer with a distinguished career at General Electric, Bulmer was responsible for increasing the college's image in the Capital Region. The establishment of distance learning, a Center for Effective Teaching, expanded services for disabled students and the addition of the McDonough Sports Complex, Cogan Hall, Fitzgibbons Health Technologies Center, the Hy Rosenblum Administration Center and the Bulmer Telecommunications Center were accomplished during Bulmer's presidency.
- Stephen M. Curtis, 1996–1998: Stephen Curtis came to Hudson Valley Community College after serving as interim president of Borough of Manhattan Community College. While at Hudson Valley, he led improvements to the college's distance learning program and helped link the college to several high schools around the region through interactive television.
- John L. Buono, 1998–2003: The only alumnus to serve as president of Hudson Valley Community College, John Buono had a lengthy career in public service before accepting the offer to serve as interim president of his alma mater. Buono served as Rensselaer County Executive from 1986 to 1995 and was then tapped by Governor George Pataki to head the New York State Dormitory Authority, where he served as director for three years. Buono's tenure as president of the college saw the creation of the Viking Child Care Center, Guenther Enrollment Services Center and the Joseph L. Bruno Stadium. He also established the college's Workforce Development Institute, which provides non-credit, customized training for business and industry.
- Marco J. Silvestri, Interim President, 2004–2005: Before serving as interim president, Silvestri served as the college's vice president for administration since 1984. During his tenure, the college received reaffirmation of its accreditation by the Middle States Association of Colleges and Universities.
- Andrew J. Matonak, 2005–2018: "Drew" Matonak assumed the presidency on April 18, 2005. Before arriving at Hudson Valley, he served as president of Northwest Iowa Community College in Sheldon, Iowa, for three years. During his 13-year tenure, Matonak led the college through successive years of enrollment growth as well as numerous improvements to the college infrastructure, including the Administration Building, the TEC-SMART facility in Malta, the Science Center, the Gene F. Haas Center for Advanced Manufacturing Skills, and the Outdoor Athletic Complex.
- Roger A. Ramsammy, 2018–June 25, 2024: Ramsammy assumed the presidency in July 2018 after previously serving as president of Miami Dade's West Campus and Northern Virginia Community College. Dr. Ramsammy previously served as a faculty member, department chair and dean at Palm Beach Community College. In August 2022, Ramsammy came under fire for his announcement that HVCC would not comply with a SUNY system-wide mandate that incoming students be vaccinated for COVID-19. The system has demanded an explanation for this announcement and the HVCC Faculty Association has filed a formal grievance against the college. Ramsammy was terminated on June 25, 2024 for sexual harassment. Louis Coplin, who recently retired as vice president of student affairs, was named by the board as interim president.

== Academics ==
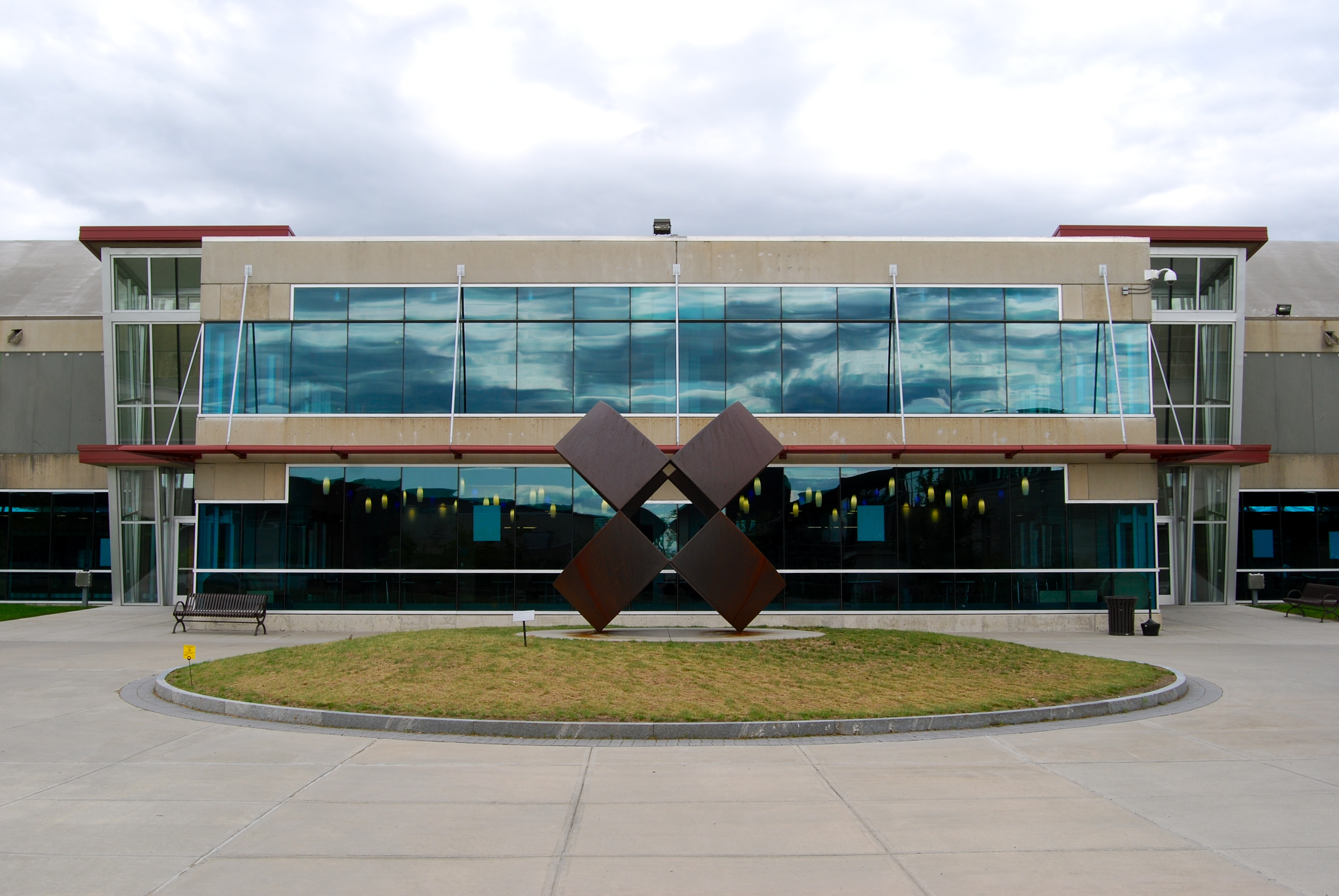
Siek Campus Center

The college offers more than 80 academic degree and certificate programs (more than 20 online) in three academic schools:

- School of Business and Liberal Arts
- School of Science, Technology, Engineering and Math
- School of Health Sciences

Some of the college's most popular academic programs include Criminal Justice, Business, Liberal Arts, Electrical Construction and Maintenance, Nursing, Computer Information Systems, Human Services and Engineering Science. Hudson Valley also offers dozens of college-level courses for the region's secondary students each year through its College in the High School program.

Transfer agreements with more than 100 four-year colleges and universities have been created and maintained so that students have a variety of opportunities once they complete their associate degree at the college. The most popular transfer destinations for graduates are University at Albany, Siena College, The College of Saint Rose and the Sage Colleges.

The college also collaborates with four-year institutions of higher education to host bachelor's degree programs directly on the Troy campus. These include a B.B.A. Business Administration degree from the State University of New York at Cobleskill.

The college oversees the Capital District Educational Opportunity Center, which provides college preparation and career training for those who are income-eligible.

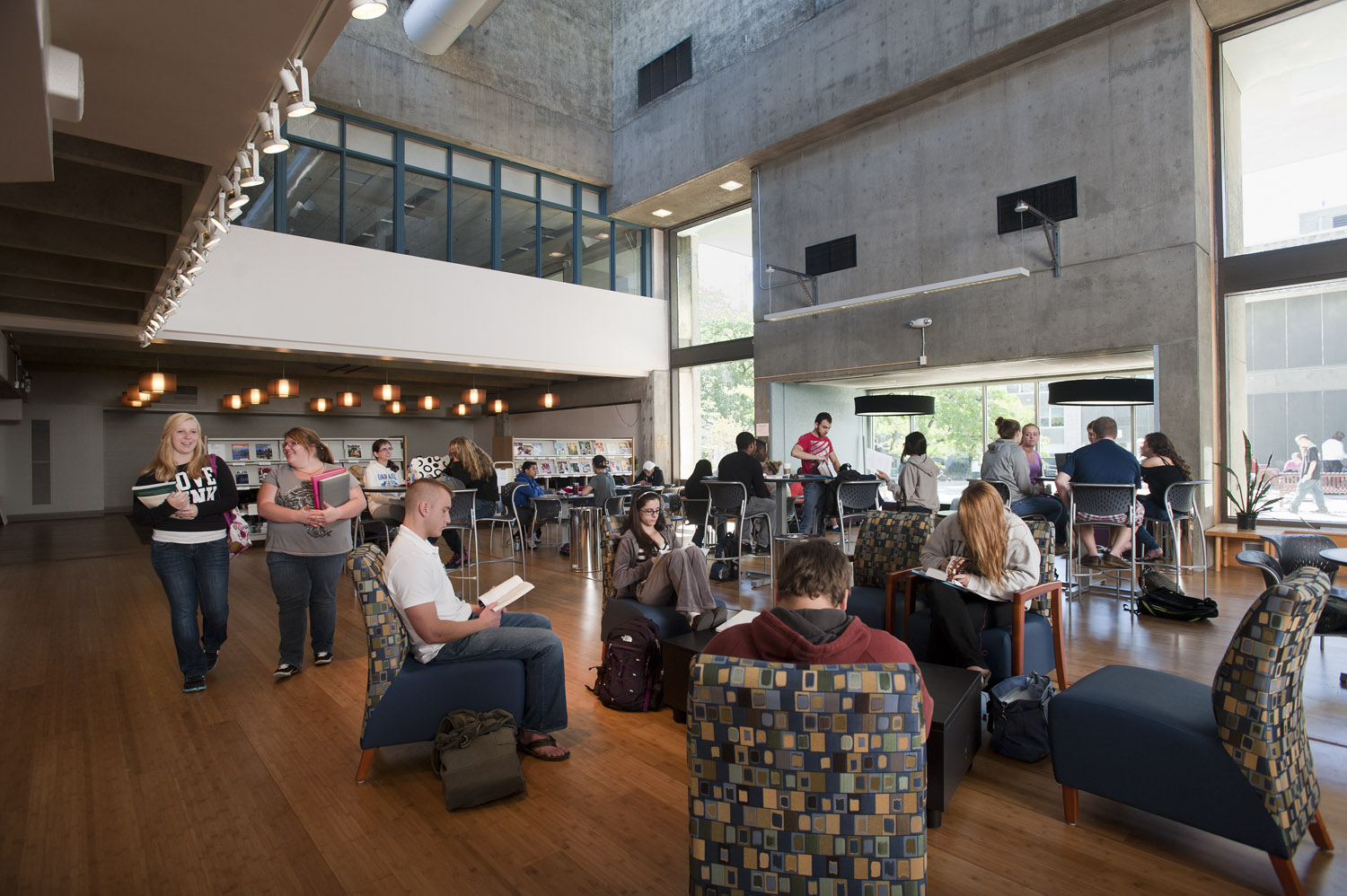
Marvin Library Learning Commons at Hudson Valley Community College, ground floor common area

The Marvin Library Learning Commons supports the college's academic programs through its collections and services. The library provides over 100,000 volumes in print, microform, and electronic format. It provides access to over 30,000 journal titles through a range of print and electronic journals. Research databases are available to all registered students and faculty and staff from the library and from off-campus. Faculty librarians are available to provide reference services and individual research consultation by appointment. The library sponsors the Voices lecture series with over a dozen speakers on topics from the arts, politics and contemporary issues in the community. The college's archives are stored in and maintained by the library.

== Student Senate ==
The Student Senate, elected from within the student body, is the elected student government on the campus. The Student Senate at Hudson Valley Community College, with administration and faculty guidance, assumes the responsibility of promoting and coordinating student affairs and student life, authorizing the establishment of new clubs and activities, promoting student welfare and assisting with the annual budget which supports the extracurricular program of over fifty different activities. The senate is composed of about 25 members.

== Athletics ==
The college currently offers intercollegiate sports for men and women. Teams compete in Region III of the National Junior College Athletic Association (NJCAA) and in the Mountain Valley Athletic Conference. The school was one of the inaugural members of the NJCAAE, the only national esports association exclusively for two-year colleges.

The Outdoor Athletic Complex, which includes a turf field for soccer, lacrosse and football as well as an eight-lane track, was completed in 2016. The facility hosted track and field and tennis competitions for the New York State Special Olympics in 2017 and 2018.

The college's teams have won national championships in ice hockey (2001), men's cross country (1996), women's bowling (1995, 2010), women's basketball (1993) and women's alpine skiing (1977).

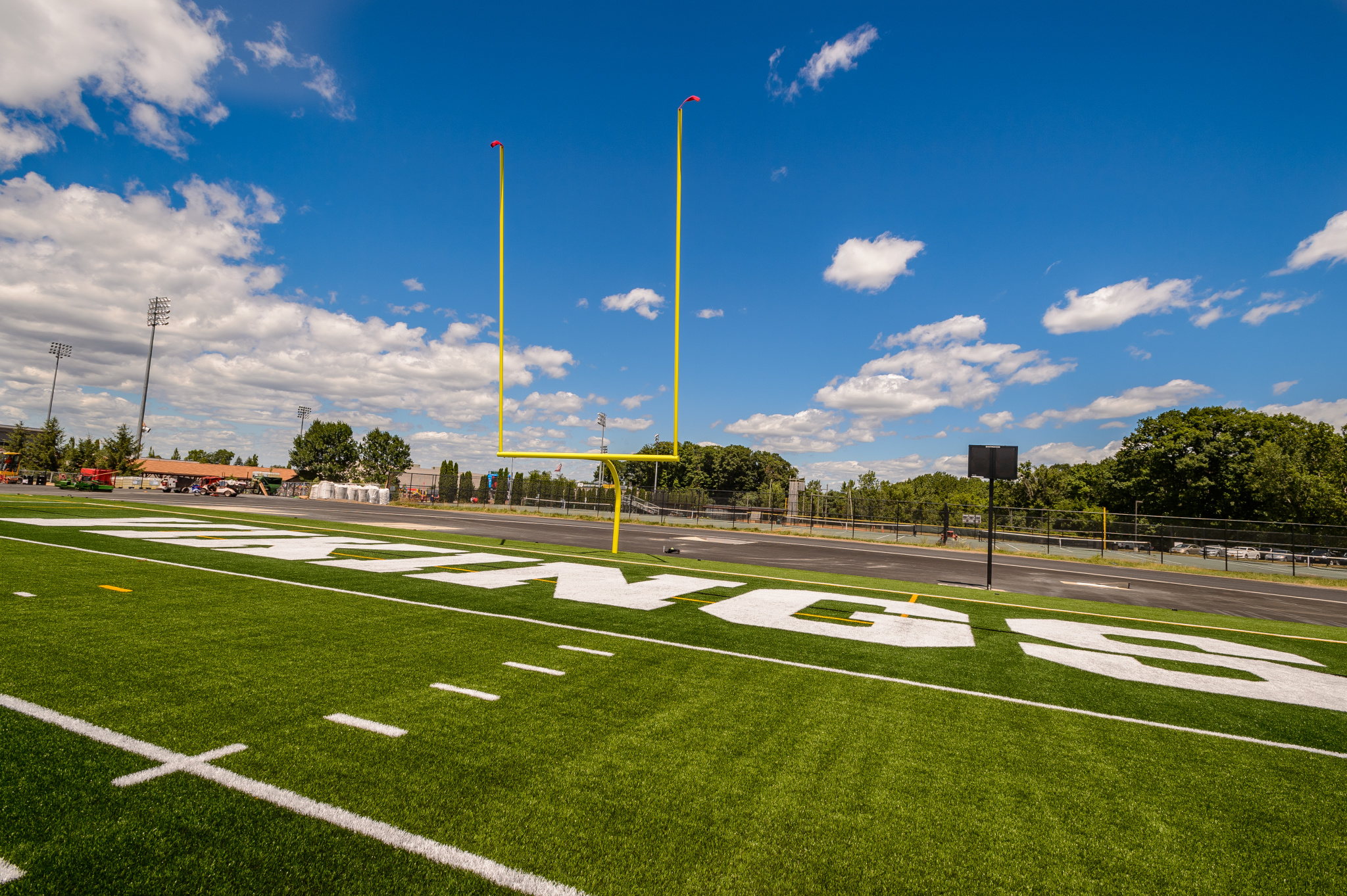
Hudson Valley Community College's Outdoor Athletic Complex

== Culture at Hudson Valley Community College ==
Maureen Stapleton Theatre – The Maureen Stapleton Theatre, dedicated in 1981, seats 350 people and is located at the north end of the Siek Campus Center. The space was named after the Academy Award-winning actress who was a native of Troy, New York.

Sculpture on campus – Two pieces by noted American sculptor Antoni Milkowski are sited on the campus. The college obtained Runner, which consists of a series of seven shiny stainless steel cubes, in 2009, as a gift from the Milkowski family. It is located in a new quad near the entrance to Administration/Classroom Building. 1971 AD, has been on view in front of the Siek Campus Center since the college's 25th anniversary. The large, cor-ten steel sphere was a gift from the artist who lived and maintained a studio for many years in New Lebanon, New York.

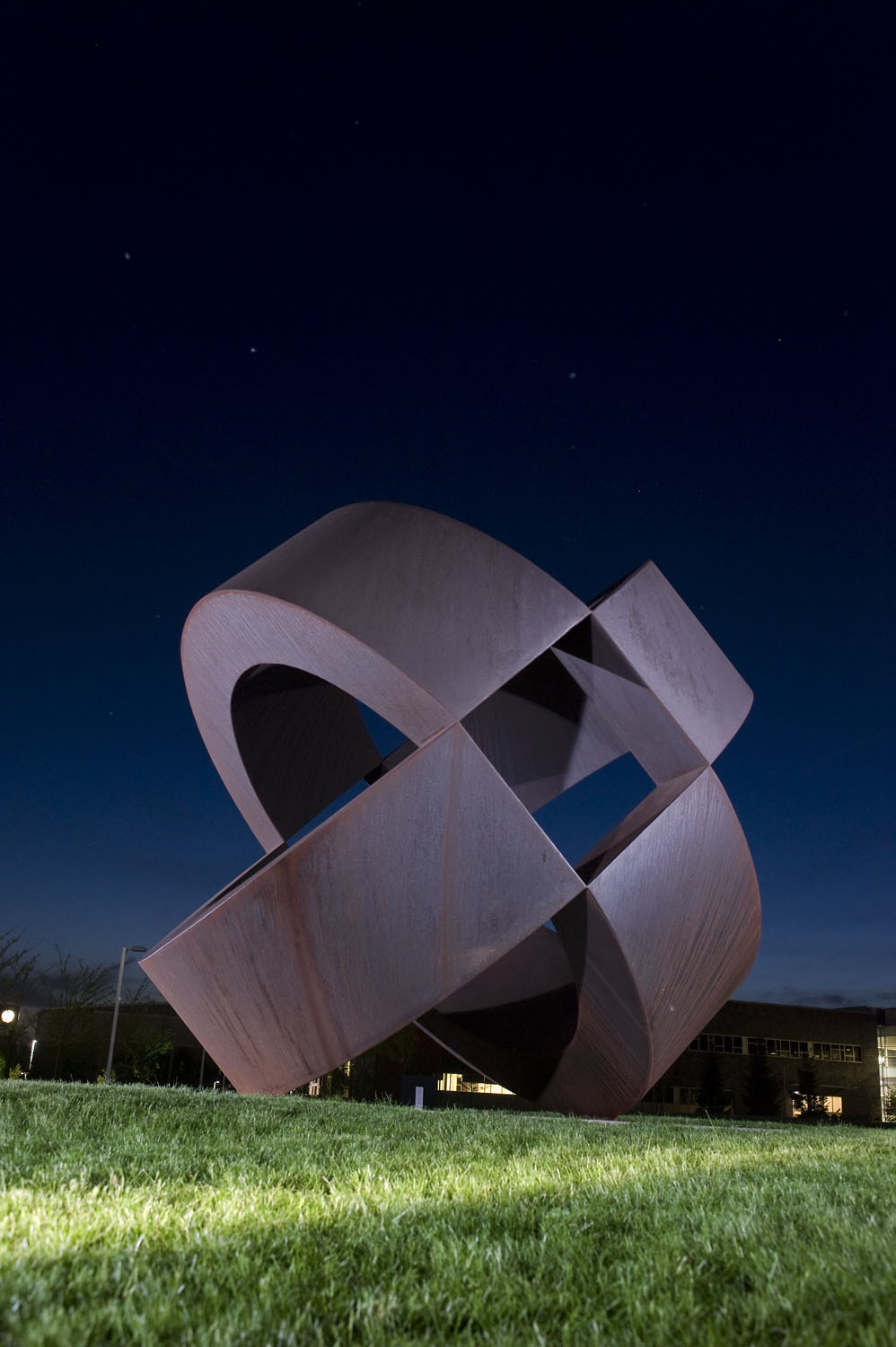
"1971 AD" by Antoni Milkowski

Teaching Gallery – The college's teaching gallery is located in the Administration/Classroom Building. The gallery displays exhibits by regional and national artists each year as well as student exhibitions.

== Off-campus sites ==
The Tec-Smart Facility located in Malta, New York.

Troy Educational Opportunity Center – Hudson Valley Community College operates an extension center at 431 River Street in Troy. The extension center, now named the Troy Educational Opportunity Center, has served as the Troy location of the Capital District Educational Opportunity Center (EOC) while the Albany location is closed. Hudson Valley, which administers the EOC, also now offers credit-bearing college courses, along with credit-free career training through its Office of Workforce Development at the site.

TEC-SMART (Training and Education Center for Semiconductor Manufacturing and Alternative and Renewable Technologies) – Opened in January 2010, the TEC-SMART facility is a joint initiative between the college and NYSERDA (New York State Energy Research and Development Authority). Located in Malta, New York's Saratoga Technology and Energy Park, the building houses the college's training classrooms in semiconductor manufacturing technology, as well as labs and classrooms for training in renewable energy technologies such as solar and wind power. TEC-SMART is also home to the Clean Technologies Early College High School program, a collaboration prepares high school students from around the region for college and careers in the fields of clean energy, mechatronics, computer information systems, cybersecurity or entrepreneurship.

== Notable alumni ==
- John L. Buono, politician
- Thomas D. Kinley, US Army major general
- Paul Price, college football coach
- Darnell Stapleton, professional football player and coach
- John E. Sweeney, politician
- Suzanne Elise Walsh, academic administrator
- Omar Yaghi, chemist and recipient of the Nobel Prize in Chemistry
