= Bell Top School =

Coordinates: 42°40′3.73″N 73°40′57.4″W

Information
- School type: primary school
- Established: 1866
- School district: East Greenbush Central School District
- NCES School ID: 360963000729
- Principal: Mike Neumann
- Teaching staff: 24.43
- Enrollment: 306 (2022-2023)
  - Kindergarten: 47
  - Grade 1: 48
  - Grade 2: 50
  - Grade 3: 51
  - Grade 4: 61
  - Grade 5: 49
- Student to teacher ratio: 12.53
- Communities served: North Greenbush, Troy, Wynantskill
- Feeder to: Goff Middle School
- Website: https://egcsd.org/bell-top-elementary/

Bell Top School is an elementary school located in North Greenbush, New York, United States of America, part of the East Greenbush Central School District.

== About ==
Bell Top is an elementary school for grades kindergarten through fifth. It is run by Principal Mike Neumann and his teachers and staff. There are two classes for each grade, i.e. two kindergarten classes, two first grade classes, two second grade classes, and so on. There are two communication skills classes, including grades K-2 in one class and grades 3-5 in another class. There are also three special education classes. Like many other elementary schools, Bell Top offers music, physical education, and art classes.

== History ==
Bell Top School was constructed in 1866. It was originally a one-room schoolhouse, costing about $1,300 to build. Later, in 1940, Bell Top expanded into a multi-classroom building, as it still stands today. During this year, the school held its first open house, marking the newly developed building.

== Special Additions ==
The Nature Trail is an integral part of Bell Top School and is a National Wildlife Federation Certified Schoolyard Habitat. The trail allows students to observe seasonal changes and is home to a waterfall. On the trail, students are able to tap maple trees for sap. The sap is later boiled and turned into maple syrup in the Learning Barn.

Bell Top is widely known in the North Greenbush and East Greenbush communities for its maple syrup production. The "Learning Barn" was built in 1997 by staff and the community surrounding Bell Top. In the barn, students participate in maple syrup production and apple cider pressing. The Learning Barn is available for other schools to use as well, not only Bell Top.
