= Rich Romer =

American football player (born 1966)

No. 94
- Position: Linebacker

Personal information
- Born: February 27, 1966 (age 60); East Greenbush, New York, U.S.
- Listed height: 6 ft 3 in (1.91 m)
- Listed weight: 222 lb (101 kg)

Career information
- High school: Columbia (East Greenbush)
- College: Union (1984–1987)
- NFL draft: 1988: 7th round, 168th overall pick

Career history
- Cincinnati Bengals (1988–1989); Pittsburgh Steelers (1990)*
- * Offseason or practice squad member only

Awards and highlights
- 2× First-team All-American (1986–1987); Second-team All-American (1985)

Career NFL statistics
- Games played: 9
- Stats at Pro Football Reference

Richard H. Romer (born February 27, 1966) is an American former professional football player who was a linebacker in the National Football League (NFL) for the Cincinnati Bengals from 1988 to 1989. He was selected by the Bengals in the seventh round of the 1988 NFL draft after playing college football for the Union Dutchmen.

== Early life ==
Richard H. Romer was born on February 27, 1966, in East Greenbush, New York. He attended Columbia High School in East Greenbush. He was the captain of the football, basketball, and track teams as a senior.

== College career ==
Romer was a four-year starter for the Union Dutchmen of Union College from 1984 to 1987 and was a stand-up defensive end. The Albany Times Union named him the "Collegiate Rookie of the Year" in 1984. He recorded 84 tackles and 13 sacks in 1985, earning Associated Press (AP) honorable mention All-American honors and Pizza Hut second-team All-American honors. Romer totaled 77 tackles and 14 sacks during the 1986 season, garnering AP first-team All-American, Football News first-team All-American, Pizza Hut first-team All-American, ECAC Upstate New York All-Star, and CoSIDA District I Academic All-American recognition. He made 85 tackles and 8.5 sacks his senior year in 1987, and was named a first-team All-American by the AP, Pizza Hut, Football News, and CoSIDA/Kodak while also being a CoSIDA District 1 Academic Team selection. He also won the William B. Jaffe Medal as Union College's "Outstanding Senior Male Athlete". Romer was also an Academic All-American while at Union College and won one of six NCAA post-graduate scholarships that were awarded to Division II and Division III players.

Romer recorded career totals of 282 tackles and a school record 42.5 sacks. He graduated from Union in 1988 with a Bachelor of Science in mechanical engineering. He was inducted into the Union College Athletics Hall of Fame in 2002.

== Professional career ==
=== Cincinnati Bengals ===
Romer was selected by the Cincinnati Bengals in the seventh round, with the 168th overall pick, of the 1988 NFL draft. He signed with the team on July 10. He was placed on injured reserve on August 29. Romer was released on October 12 but re-signed two days later. He played in four games for the Bengals during the 1988 season before being placed on injured reserve for the second time on November 26, 1988. He became the first NFL player from his college since Fred Brumm played in one game for the Tonawanda Kardex in 1921.

In 1989, he competed for a roster spot with 1989 draft picks Kerry Owens and Chris Chenault. Romer ended up making the regular season roster while Owens and Chenault were both waived. Romer played in five games during the 1989 season before being released on October 23, 1989.

=== Pittsburgh Steelers ===
Romer signed with the Pittsburgh Steelers on April 3, 1990. He was waived on August 20, 1990.

== Post-football career ==
From 1990 to 1994, Romer served on New York governor Mario Cuomo's Youth Drug Prevention Campaign/Athletes Against Drunk Driving program. He graduated from the State University of New York at Albany in 1993 with a Master of Business Administration. He later worked as a businessman and engineer at several companies. Romer was inducted into the East Greenbush Education Foundation Alumni Hall of Fame.
