= John L. Buono =

American politician (born 1943)

Chair of the New York State Thruway Authority
- In office 2003–2011
- Succeeded by: Howard Milstein

President of Hudson Valley Community College
- In office 1998–2003
- Preceded by: Stephen M. Curtis
- Succeeded by: Marco J. Silvestri (interim)

Executive Director of the Dormitory Authority of the State of New York
- In office 1995–1998

Rensselaer County Executive
- In office 1986–1995
- Preceded by: William J. Murphy
- Succeeded by: Henry F. Zwack

Rensselaer County Clerk
- In office 1979–1985

Personal details
- Born: 1943 (age 82–83)
- Education: Hudson Valley Community College; University at Albany, SUNY

John L. Buono (born 1943) is an American politician and government official who previously served as chair of the New York State Thruway Authority and president of Hudson Valley Community College. A native of Rensselaer County, he held county office there for more than fifteen years before a series of state appointments under Governor George Pataki.

== Early life and education ==
Buono graduated from Hudson Valley Community College in 1968, and earned bachelor's and master's degrees from University at Albany, SUNY. His first job was that of an administrator and teacher at St. Agnes School in Loudonville, New York. By the mid 1970s, he had switched to civil service, becoming commissioner of employment and training for Rensselaer County and deputy county executive.

== Career ==
=== Rensselaer County ===
He was elected Rensselaer County Clerk in 1978, and Rensselaer County Executive in 1985. He served as county executive from 1986 until 1995.

=== State appointments and college presidency ===
In 1995, George E. Pataki appointed Buono to direct the New York State Dormitory Authority. In 1998, Buono assumed the presidency of Hudson Valley Community College. He was the first alumnus of the college to lead it, having graduated in 1968. The college records that his administration expanded articulation agreements with four-year institutions to ease student transfers, and that three major construction projects were completed during his presidency: Joseph L. Bruno Stadium, the Guenther Enrollment Services Center, and a cogeneration plant. In 2007, he was inducted into the college's athletics hall of fame.

=== New York State Thruway Authority ===
In 2002, Pataki appointed him to lead the Thruway Authority. He served until the expiration of his term in 2011. He was succeeded as chair by Howard Milstein. The authority, which also oversees the New York State Canal Corporation, raised tolls during his chairmanship, and in 2007 State Comptroller Thomas DiNapoli directed auditors to examine its finances and operations, including capital spending and uncollected E-ZPass tolls.

Political offices
Preceded by	Rensselaer County, New York County Clerk; 1979 – 1985	Succeeded by
Preceded by William J. Murphy	Rensselaer County, New York Executive; 1986 – 1995	Succeeded by Henry F. Zwack
Government offices
Preceded by	Director of the Dormitory Authority of the State of New York; 1995 – 1998	Succeeded by
Preceded by	Chair of the New York State Thruway Authority; 2003 – 2011	Succeeded by Howard Milstein
Academic offices
Preceded by Stephen M. Curtis	President of Hudson Valley Community College; 1998 – 2003	Succeeded by Marco J. Silvestri (interim)
