= Salem No. 7 =

1967 sculpture by Antoni Milkowski

Coordinates: 43°10′32.1″N 87°56′07.5″W

- Artist: Antoni Milkowski
- Year: 1967
- Type: Cor-Ten steel
- Dimensions: 420 cm × 370 cm × 370 cm (166 in × 144 in × 144 in)
- Location: Lynden Sculpture Garden; Milwaukee, Wisconsin

Salem No. 7 is a public art work by artist Antoni Milkowski located at the Lynden Sculpture Garden near Milwaukee, Wisconsin. The Cor-Ten steel sculpture is a geometric form composed of six cubes surrounding a seventh cube of empty space; it is installed on the lawn.
