= Antoni Milkowski =

American sculptor (1935–2001)

- Born: October 7, 1935; Evanston, Illinois
- Died: New Lebanon, New York
- Occupations: sculpture, educator
- Spouse: Susan Hartung
- Children: 2

Antoni Milkowski (1935–2001) was an American minimalist sculptor and educator.

== Biography ==
Antoni "Tony" Milkowski was born October 7, 1935, in Evanston, Illinois. He was also known as "Antek", particularly by his family. When he was two years old, the family moved to New York City. He attended Kenyon College where he received a degree in biology in 1957. For a time, he considered pursuing a career in medicine, taking additional science courses at Columbia University. Instead, in 1958, he enlisted in the United States Marine Corps Officers Candidate Program. While stationed in San Diego, California, he took drawing and art history courses at the University of California, Berkeley, extension program.

Discharged from the Marine Corps in 1961, Milkowski returned to New York and worked for a time as a recreation leader for the NYC Parks Department. The following year, he enrolled in an M.A. program at Hunter College. He worked on and off in the Queens parks during this time and also taught at the Lost Battalion Hall Recreation Center.

In 1963, while at Hunter College, Milkowski began studying with Tony Smith, Ad Reinhardt, Michael Ponce de Leon, George Sugarman, and Eugene Goossen. His interactions with these artists, in addition to his meeting David Smith, cemented his desire to pursue sculpture.

It was in 1964–1965, while a Fulbright Program scholar in Poland (where he also taught at the Academy of Fine Arts in Warsaw), that Milkowski was invited to participate in the Biennial of Forms in Space, where he created his first major large-scale public work entitled "Poland Column". During this period, he began to develop his aesthetic of merging geometry and repetition, mainly in modular units and generally in steel. Over the years, he refined his methods and became interested in the concept of negative space and of the three-dimensional form in space.

The sculpture Salem No. 7, from 1968, exemplifies these ideas. The piece consists of seven rectangular prisms (34″ × 34″ × 48″ each) and has a total size of 4′ high × 28′ long × 4′ deep. The massive scale is offset by its expansive and open surroundings. Additionally, the contrast between the manmade, cold material and the lushness of the landscape surrounding it create the type of contrast that Milkowski often sought in his work. When observing Seven up close, it becomes apparent that the artist used unfinished edges, which brings to mind drawn edges one might see in painting. When viewing the piece from afar and from different angles, however, the user has the opportunity to see an ever-shifting work. In high light or low light, from back or front, in winter or summer, the viewer is privy to seeing something new with each successive viewing.

In 1974, Milkowski married artist and teacher Susan Hartung. They had two children together. After retiring from Hunter College, where he taught from 1966 to 1998, he lived and continued creating art in New Lebanon, New York. He died in 2001.

== Permanent installations ==
- 2012 Berkshire Community College, Pittsfield MA
- 2012 State University of New York, Albany NY
- 2007 Kenyon College, Gambier OH
- 2006 Albany Institute of History and Art, Albany NY
- 2003 The Fields, Art OMI, Ghent NY
- 1988 Hofstra University, Hempstead, NY
- 1975 Hudson Valley Community College, Troy NY
- 1973 Marine Midland Center, Buffalo NY
- 1972 Madison Square Park, NYC (moved to Bellevue South Park, NYC in 2001)
- 1971 Hornick Factory, Haverstraw NY
- 1968 Area 12, Charles Center, Baltimore MD
- 1968 Bradley Sculpture Park, Milwaukee WI
- 1968 Albright-Knox Gallery, Buffalo NY
- 1967 The Governor Nelson A. Rockefeller Empire State Plaza Art Collection, Albany NY
- 1965 Elblag, Poland

== Selected exhibitions ==
- 2008 SculptureNow, Lenox MA
- 2002 One-person Show, In Memoriam, Berkshire Community College, Pittsfield MA
- 2001 Contemporary Sculpture at Chesterwood '01, Stockbridge MA (Also 1996, 1991, 1985, 1982)
- 2001 Three-person show, Art Sites, Greenport NY
- 2001 Art and Mathematics, Koussevitzky Art Gallery, Pittsfield MA
- 2000 Museum Ball and Contemporary Art Auction, Albany Museum of History and Art, Albany NY. (Also 1999, 1998, 1997, 1995, 1993, 1992, 1991)
- 1999 Set in Steel, a retrospective, Hunter College, Times Square Gallery, NYC
- 1999 Rondout Biennial Sculpture Exhibitions, Kingston NY. (Also 1998 and 1997)
- 1997 Hunter College Benefit Auction, Leubsdorf Gallery, Hunter College, NYC
- 1996 Hunter College Faculty Exhibition, The Art Gallery, Hunter College, NYC. (Also 1993)
- 1994 Sculpture at Naumkeag, Stockbridge MA
- 1993 The Rickey Collection of Constructivist Art, Neuberger Museum, Purchase NY
- 1992 Bridges, Boulevard Project-Space, Albany NY
- 1991 Eight Young Artists: Then and Now – 1964 & 1991, Hunter College, NYC
- 1990 Two-person show, Contemporary Art, University of Slask, Cieszyn, Poland
- 1988 In Memory of John Bernard Myers, Kouros Gallery, NYC
- 1988 Two-person show, College of Saint Rose, Albany NY
- 1988 Art as Act: Representing Vietnam, Leubsdorf Gallery, Hunter College, NYC
- 1986 Tricentennial Salute to Sculpture, Academy Lafayette Park, Albany NY
- 1985 Aspects of Constructivism, The Atrium Gallery, G. E. Corporatio, Schenectady NY
- 1985 Steel ... The Show, The Gallery, Albany Institute of History and Art, Albany NY
- 1980 Wards Island Show, NYC
- 1979 Berkshire Community College, Pittsfield MA
- 1977 Seven Area Artists, Hudson Valley Community College, Troy NY
- 1976 American Academy and Institute of Arts and Letters, NYC
- 1973-1999 sculpture on exhibit, State University of New York at Albany, Albany NY
- 1973 sculpture on exhibit, Tanglewood Music Center, Lenox MA
- 1971 John C. Myers Gallery, NYC
- 1970 Jewish Museum, NYC

== Academic and professional honors ==
- 1990-1991 City University of New York Research Grant for large-scale sculpture
- 1990 Artist's Residency, Association of Norwegian Artists, Svolvaer, Norway
- 1990 Lecturer, Slask University, Cieszyn, Poland
- 1984 Artist in Residence, Washington State University, Pullman WA
- 1977 National Sculpture Conference, Jonesboro, Arkansas. Invited to participate in panel on scale and environment.
- 1976 Artist in Residence, Artpark, Lewiston NY
- 1974 NEA Matching Grant for Hudson Valley Community College, Troy NY
- 1973-1974 City University Research Grant for large-scale sculpture
- 1973 Inclusion in HUD publication, "Sculpture for Public Places"
- 1971-1972 City University of New York Research Grant for large-scale sculpture
- 1968-1969 Design in Steel Awards, citation for excellence
- 1964-1965 Fulbright Joint Government Grant for study in Poland. Worked in sculpture and graphics at Academy of Fine Arts, Warsaw. Conducted seminars and lectures on contemporary American art.

== Selected bibliography ==
- Glueck, Grace, "Antoni Milkowski, 'Set in Steel'," New York Times, November 19, 1999
- "Campus Adorned with More Sculpture this Fall," Hofstra News, September 1988, p.2
- "Milkowski's Sculpture on Exhibit Now at Sutters Antiques and Art, Chatham Magazine, August 1986, p.16
- Wright, Peg, "Brush Marks," Schenectady Gazette, August 29, 1985
- Johnson, Ken, "Chesterwood: An Outdoor Gallery of Art," Albany Times Union, August 25, 1985
- Russell, Gloria, "Sculpture and Nature in Harmony at Chesterwood," Springfield Sunday Republican, July 7, 1985
- Bonenti, Charles, "Sculpture at Chesterwood," Berkshire Eagle, July 22, 1982, p.21
- Bell, Winifred, "A Perfect Sculpture Setting," Berkshire Eagle, October 4, 1979, p.11
- Pasquine, Ruth, "Sculpture on Display at BCC," Berkshire Eagle, October 3, 1979, p.4
- Hawkins, Stephen, "Chatham Sculptor Creating Work to be Placed at HVCC," Berkshire Eagle, December 22, 1975, p.34
- "East Chatham Sculptor's Design Fabricated at Stephentown Plant," The Echo, December 20, 1975, p.1
- Dicker, Fredric U., "HVCC Sculpture Accepted Reluctantly," The Times Union, July 2, 1975, p.3
- Shirey, David L., "Paramus Sculpture Show Covers Half-Mile," New York Times, June 30, 1971, p.30
- Baro, Gene, "Decisive Art Collection of the Barton G. Tremains," Vogue, February 1969, p.132
- Design in Steel Awards Catalog, 1969, p.42
- Battock, Gregory, ed., Minimal Art, A Critical Anthology, New York: E. P. Dutton, 1968, pp.165–174
- House Beautiful, November 1968
- "Art World Hails Antoni Milkowski," Polish American Journal, April 13, 1968, p.6
- Time magazine, October 13, 1967, p.81
- Glueck, Grace, "Sculpfest,," New York Times, June 25, 1967, p.23
- Glueck, Grace, "New York Gallery Notes," Art in America, May/June 1967, pp.114,116
- "Lost Leonardos," Newsweek, February 27, 1967, p.98
- Glueck, Grace, "On the Whole, It's Avant Garde," New York Times, January 28, 1967, p.C23
- Goossen, E. C., "Distillation: A Joint Showing," Artforum, November 1966, p.32
- Browne, Rackstraw, "Reviews and Previews," Artnews, Summer 1966, p.64
- Kwiatowski, Gerard, "We are Optimistic," Poland Illustrated Magazine, January 1966, p.7
