= Hampton Manor, New York =

- CDP
- Location in Rensselaer County and the state of New York.

- Location within the state of New York
- Coordinates: 42°37′8″N 73°43′33″W
- Country: United States
- State: New York
- County: Rensselaer

Area
  - Total: 3.02 sq mi (7.82 km^{2})
  - Land: 3.00 sq mi (7.76 km^{2})
  - Water: 0.023 sq mi (0.06 km^{2})
- Elevation: 207 ft (63 m)

Population (2020)
  - Total: 5,423
  - Density: 1,809/sq mi (698.5/km^{2})
- Time zone: UTC-5 (Eastern (EST))
  - Summer (DST): UTC-4 (EDT)
- FIPS code: 36-31918
- GNIS feature ID: 1867405

Hampton Manor is a census-designated place in the town of East Greenbush in Rensselaer County, New York, United States. The population was 5,423 at the 2020 census.

Hampton Manor is a suburb of the cities of Rensselaer and Albany. Many of the homes built in Hampton Manor were kit houses from Sears Roebuck and Montgomery Ward.

== Geography ==
Hampton Manor is located at 42°37′8″N 73°43′33″W (42.618846, -73.725704).

According to the United States Census Bureau, the CDP has a total area of 0.6 square miles (1.6 km^{2}), of which, 0.6 square miles (1.6 km^{2}) of it is land and 0.04 square miles (0.10 km^{2}) of it (3.08%) is water.

== Demographics ==
Historical population
Census	Pop.	Note	%±
2020	5,423		—
U.S. Decennial Census

=== 2020 census ===
As of the 2020 census, Hampton Manor had a population of 5,423. The median age was 40.8 years. 20.4% of residents were under the age of 18 and 15.7% of residents were 65 years of age or older. For every 100 females there were 91.2 males, and for every 100 females age 18 and over there were 90.8 males age 18 and over.

97.9% of residents lived in urban areas, while 2.1% lived in rural areas.

There were 2,322 households in Hampton Manor, of which 27.9% had children under the age of 18 living in them. Of all households, 45.2% were married-couple households, 18.8% were households with a male householder and no spouse or partner present, and 27.2% were households with a female householder and no spouse or partner present. About 28.6% of all households were made up of individuals and 10.7% had someone living alone who was 65 years of age or older.

There were 2,415 housing units, of which 3.9% were vacant. The homeowner vacancy rate was 0.4% and the rental vacancy rate was 6.9%.

Racial composition as of the 2020 census
Race	Number	Percent
White	4,571	84.3%
Black or African American	197	3.6%
American Indian and Alaska Native	10	0.2%
Asian	262	4.8%
Native Hawaiian and Other Pacific Islander	4	0.1%
Some other race	59	1.1%
Two or more races	320	5.9%
Hispanic or Latino (of any race)	226	4.2%

=== 2000 census ===
As of the 2000 census, there were 2,525 people, 1,040 households, and 690 families residing in the CDP. The population density was 4,002.3 inhabitants per square mile (1,545.3/km^{2}). There were 1,079 housing units at an average density of 1,710.3 per square mile (660.4/km^{2}). The racial makeup of the CDP was 95.37% White, 1.70% African American, 0.16% Native American, 1.70% Asian, 0.12% from other races, and 0.95% from two or more races. Hispanic or Latino of any race were 0.71% of the population.

There were 1,040 households, out of which 32.8% had children under the age of 18 living with them, 48.6% were married couples living together, 13.6% had a female householder with no husband present, and 33.6% were non-families. 28.9% of all households were made up of individuals, and 10.6% had someone living alone who was 65 years of age or older. The average household size was 2.40 and the average family size was 2.97.

In the CDP, the population was spread out, with 24.8% under the age of 18, 5.0% from 18 to 24, 32.1% from 25 to 44, 22.8% from 45 to 64, and 15.3% who were 65 years of age or older. The median age was 39 years. For every 100 females, there were 91.9 males. For every 100 females age 18 and over, there were 86.5 males.

The median income for a household in the CDP was $42,794, and the median income for a family was $46,818. Males had a median income of $32,022 versus $30,694 for females. The per capita income for the CDP was $21,589. None of the families and 1.3% of the population were living below the poverty line, including no under eighteens and 4.8% of those over 64.
