= Columbia High School (East Greenbush, New York) =

Location
- 962 Luther Road; East Greenbush, New York 12061; United States; 42.625723°N 73.691017°W

Information
- School type: Public school (government funded), high school
- Motto: Creating Honor and Success
- Founded: 1955
- Status: Open
- Locale: Rural, Fringe
- School district: East Greenbush Central School District
- NCES District ID: 3609630
- Superintendent: Dr. Kurtis Kotes
- NCES School ID: 360963000731
- Principal: Michael Harkin
- Faculty: 101.39 (FTE)
- Grades: 9–12
- Years offered: 4
- Enrollment: 1,215 (2023-2024)
- Student to teacher ratio: 11.98
- Campus: Suburban
- Colors: Blue and White
- Athletics conference: Section 2 NY
- Mascot: Blue Devil
- Team name: Blue Devils
- Newspaper: The Devils Advocate
- Yearbook: The Columbian Yearbook
- Communities served: East Greenbush; North Greenbush; Nassau; Chatham; Sand Lake; Schodack
- Feeder schools: Goff Middle School

Columbia High School (or CHS) is a public high school located on Luther Road in East Greenbush, New York, USA. It is the only high school for the East Greenbush Central School District and has a 2019-20 enrollment of approximately 1,230 students in grades 9-12. The school has a thirteen to one student to teacher ratio that is below the state average. Columbia High School, commonly referred to CHS, is home to the "Blue Devils". The principal is Michael Harkin, who replaced John Sawchuk in January 2018.

== Academics ==
The school offers eleven Advanced Placement classes in: Biology, Calculus AB, Calculus BC, Economics: Micro, English Literature & Composition, Environmental Science, European History, Physics, Chemistry, U.S. History, and World History.

== 2004 shooting ==
On February 9, 2004, 16-year old student Jon Romano fired three rounds with a 12-gauge shotgun. He was rushed and tackled by teacher Michael Bennett and assistant principal John Sawchuck. While being tackled, Romano fired the gun and shot Bennett in the leg. Romano was sentenced to 20 years in prison, and was later released early in 2020. After his release from prison, Romano began speaking publicly on TikTok about gun violence and the youth mental health crisis.

== Notable alumni ==
- Jacob Clemente, Broadway performer.
- Jennifer Farley, television personality, MTV's Jersey Shore.
- Brian Lashoff, professional hockey player, currently under contract with the Detroit Red Wings.
- Danielle Roberts, physician involved in the NXIVM cult scandal
- Rich Romer, professional football player, Cincinnati Bengals
- Raymond F. Shields Jr., Adjutant General of New York
- Kevin Smith, professional baseball player
- Ernie Stautner, professional football player, coach and Pro Football Hall of Famer
- Tyler Szalkowski, guitarist of the pop-rock band State Champs
