= East Greenbush Central School District =

School district in New York, United States

Address
- 29 Englewood Avenue East Greenbush, New York, 12061; United States

District information
- Type: Public
- Grades: K–12
- NCES District ID: 3609630

Students and staff
- Students: 4,065 (2020–2021)
- Teachers: 341.25 (on an FTE basis)
- Staff: 377.6 (on an FTE basis)
- Student–teacher ratio: 11.91:1

Other information
- Website: www.egcsd.org

The East Greenbush Central School District is a public school district located in East Greenbush, New York. Approximately 4,000 students are enrolled in seven schools - one high school, one middle school and five neighborhood elementary schools.

All district schools are in Good Standing according to the New York State Education Department.

Columbia High School has a 97% graduation rate and was named a Recognition School by the New York State Education Department in 2019 and 2020.

== Schools ==
=== Elementary ===
- Bell Top Elementary School
- Donald P. Sutherland Elementary School
- Genet Elementary School
- Green Meadow Elementary School
- Red Mill Elementary School

=== Middle ===
- Goff Middle School

=== High ===
- Columbia High School

== Board of education members ==
Robert Panasci
