= Henry F. Zwack =

American lawyer

Acting New York Supreme Court Justice, 3rd Judicial District
- In office December 2006 – present

Judge of the New York Court of Claims
- In office 2006–2014
- Appointed by: George Pataki
- In office 2014–2023
- Appointed by: Andrew Cuomo

Rensselaer County Executive
- In office May, 1995 – May 13, 2001
- Preceded by: John L. Buono
- Succeeded by: Kathleen M. Jimino

Rensselaer County, New York Legislator
- In office January 1, 1986 – December 31, 1994

Personal details
- Born: December 5, 1952 (age 73) Bronx, New York
- Party: Republican
- Spouse: Laura Zwack
- Children: 3
- Education: Albany Law School

Henry F. Zwack (born December 5, 1952) is a lawyer and politician, most notable for having served as Rensselaer County, New York county executive and as an Acting New York State Supreme Court Justice.

Mr. Zwack is a graduate of Siena College in Loudonville, New York and the Albany Law School. He hails from Stephentown, New York, where his father started a sheet metal fabrication business in the 1970s.

He began his political career in the Rensselaer County Legislature, eventually rising to chairman. In 1995, he was first appointed by the county legislature and then elected to serve out the term of the departing Rensselaer County executive and was reelected once before resigning to defend himself against corruption charges. He was ultimately acquitted of all counts.

Governor George Pataki subsequently appointed him Executive Deputy Commissioner, New York State Office of Alcoholism and Substance Abuse Services (OASAS) and later as a Judge on the New York State Court of Claims in December, 2006. He has chambers in Troy, New York, and is assigned in Rensselaer, Columbia and Ulster Counties as an Acting Supreme Court Justice.

Political offices
Preceded by	Rensselaer County, New York Legislator; January 1, 1986 - December 31, 1994	Succeeded by
Preceded by John L. Buono	Rensselaer County, New York Executive; May, 1995 – May 13, 2001	Succeeded by Kathleen M. Jimino
Government offices
Preceded by	Executive Deputy Commissioner, New York State Office of Alcoholism and Substance Abuse Services – December, 2006	Succeeded by
Legal offices
Preceded by	Acting New York State Supreme Court Justice, 3rd Judicial District; December, 2006 - present	Incumbent
