= Peter B. Zwack =

United States Army officer and diplomatic attaché

- Military career
- Allegiance: United States
- Branch: United States Army
- Service years: 1980–2014
- Rank: Brigadier General
- Known for: Senior Defense Attaché in Russia (2012–2014); Author; Academic
- Battles: Kosovo War; War in Afghanistan
- Awards: Bronze Star; Distinguished Service Medal; Legion of Merit; Joint Chiefs of Staff "Action Officer of the Year" (1999)
- Other work: Global Fellow at the Kennan Institute; Wilson Center; National Defense University

Peter B. Zwack is a retired American brigadier general who served for some years during the Obama administration as military attaché to the United States Embassy in Russia.

== Biography ==
=== Military career ===
In 1980, Zwack received his commission at Fort Benning, Georgia, and began his career in the United States Army as an intelligence officer in an artillery battalion. He is an Army Ranger and paratrooper. His career included stops in West Germany, South Korea, Kosovo, Afghanistan, and Russia.

Zwack was employed in military intelligence and was Senior Defense Attaché in Russia from 2012 to 2014, appointed to work with Hillary Clinton and exited under John Kerry. He retired after 34 years in service.

=== Memoirist and academic ===
Now working at the Wilson Center as a Global Fellow at the Kennan Institute, and the National Defense University, Zwack has become a notable academic. Some of his work includes:

- A NATO-Russia Contingency Command
- Russia's Contradictory Relationship with the West

Since his retirement, Zwack has written at least two memoirs:

- 2021, Afghanistan Kabul Kurier: One Soldier's Story of the Taliban, Tribes & Ethnicities, Opium Trade, & Burqa
- 2021, Swimming the Volga: A U.S. Army Officer's Experiences in Pre - Putin Russia

His ideas are regularly cited in books, and he is regularly a presence in the news analysis circuit. For example, he was interviewed by CNN in October 2016, after the U.S. had accused the Russians of drugging American embassy staff.

In February 2020, Zwack supported LTC Alexander Vindman after the latter was removed by the Trump administration for his testimony in the First impeachment of Donald Trump. Zwack had been Vindman's superior when they both were military attachés in Moscow.

== Personal ==
In the 2024 United States presidential election, Zwack endorsed Kamala Harris.

== Awards ==
Zwack is a recipient of the Bronze Star, Distinguished Service Medal and Legion of Merit. In 1999, he was awarded the Joint Chiefs of Staff "Action Officer of the Year".
