= Paul Price (American football) =

American football coach (born c. 1961)

Current position
- Title: Associate Head Coach & Defensive Coordinator
- Team: West Virginia Wesleyan Bobcats
- Conference: Mountain East

Biographical details
- Born: c. 1961 (age 64–65); Munhall, Pennsylvania, U.S.
- Education: West Virginia Wesleyan College (1984); Hudson Valley Community College (1986)

Playing career
- 1979–1982: West Virginia Wesleyan
- Position: Center

Coaching career (HC unless noted)
- 1983–?: Hudson Valley (assistant)
- 1989–1993: West Virginia Wesleyan (OC)
- 1994–1995: West Virginia Wesleyan (DC)
- 1996–1998: West Virginia Tech
- 1999–2008: West Virginia Wesleyan (DC)
- 2009–2010: Concord (LB)
- 2011–2015: Concord (DC/LB)
- 2016–2019: Concord
- 2020–2023: West Virginia State (ST/LB)
- 2023-2024: Berkeley Springs High School (DC/ST)
- 2025-present: West Virginia Wesleyan College

Head coaching record
- Overall: 8–68

Accomplishments and honors

Awards
- 2× First Team All-WVIAC (1981–1982)

Paul Price (born c. 1961) is an American college football coach. He served as the head football coach at West Virginia University Institute of Technology in Montgomery, West Virginia from 1996 to 1998 and at Concord University in Athens, West Virginia from 2016 to 2019. Served as the Specials Teams and Linebackers coach at West Virginia State University from 2020 until June 2023. He became defensive coordinator at Berkeley Springs High School in 2023 through 2024. He was the Physical Education teacher for Paw Paw Schools in WV 2023-2025. In 2024 he was an Assistant Track Coach at Paw Paw High School primarily working with throwers. March 2025 named Associate Head Coach and Defensive Coordinator at his Alma mater West Virginia Wesleyan College his third coaching stent at the school.

== Head coaching record ==
Year	Team	Overall	Conference	Standing	Bowl/playoffs
West Virginia Tech Golden Bears (West Virginia Intercollegiate Athletic Conference) (1996–1998)
1996	West Virginia Tech	0–11			
1997	West Virginia Tech	0–11			
1998	West Virginia Tech	1–10			
West Virginia Tech:		1–31			
Concord Mountain Lions (Mountain East Conference) (2016–2019)
2016	Concord	2–9	2–8	T–10th	
2017	Concord	2–9	1–9	11th	
2018	Concord	2–9	2–8	10th	
2019	Concord	1–10	1–9	T–9th	
Concord:		7–37	6–34		
Total:		8–68			
