= East Greenbush, New York =

East Greenbush
- Town
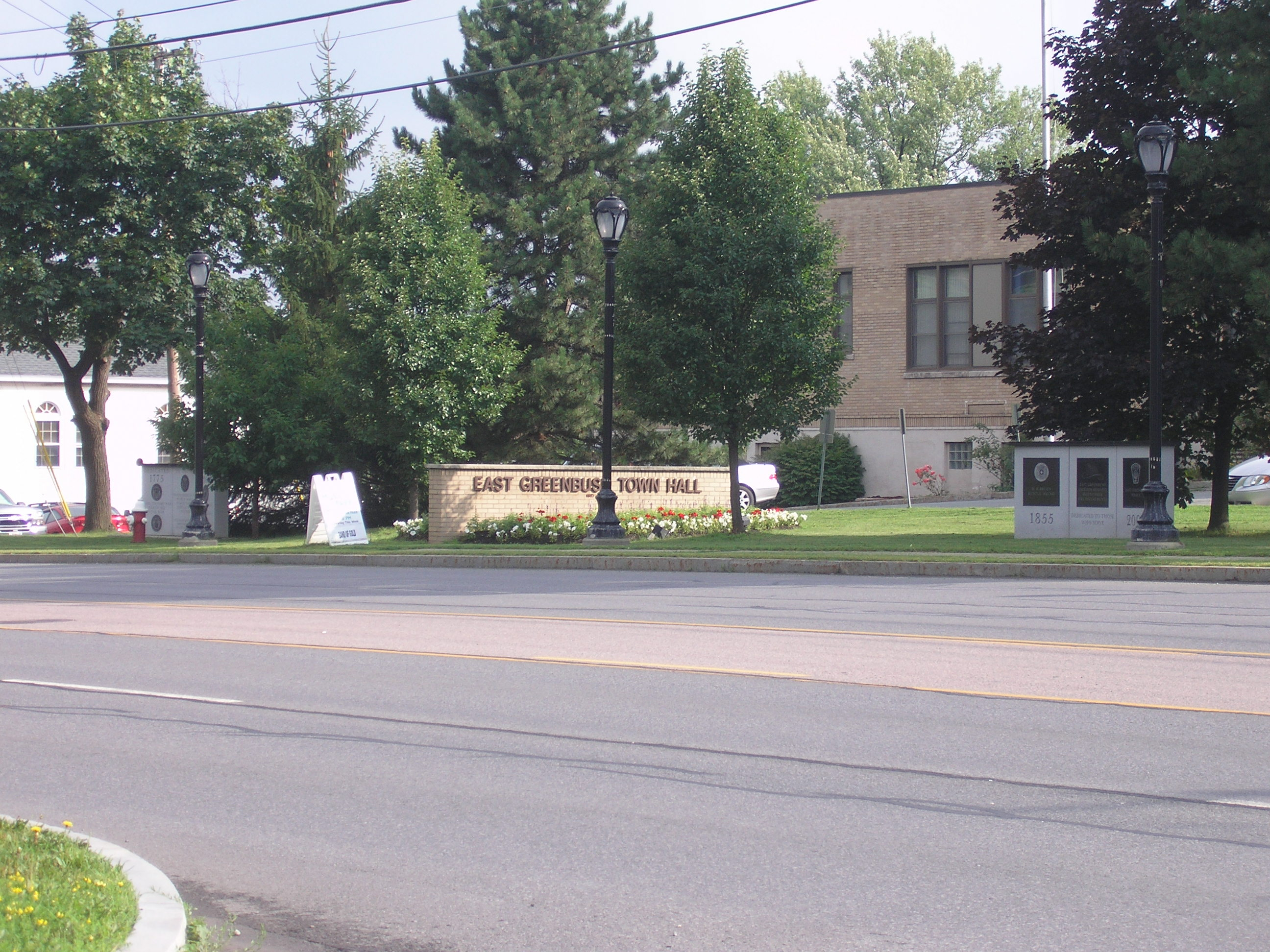
- The East Greenbush Town Hall on Columbia Turnpike
- Etymology: Dutch Greenen Bosch, "pine woods."
- Location in Rensselaer County and the state of New York.

- Location of New York in the United States
- Coordinates: 42°36′44″N 73°41′58″W
- Country: United States
- State: New York
- County: Rensselaer
- Incorporation as town: 1855

Government
  - Town supervisor: Jack Conway

Area
  - Total: 24.29 sq mi (62.92 km^{2})
  - Land: 24.02 sq mi (62.21 km^{2})
  - Water: 0.27 sq mi (0.71 km^{2})
- Elevation: 236 ft (72 m)
- Lowest elevation: 0 ft (0 m)

Population (2020)
  - Total: 16,748
  - Density: 697.3/sq mi (269.2/km^{2})
- Time zone: UTC-5 (EST)
  - Summer (DST): UTC-4 (EDT)
- Area code: 518
- FIPS code: 36-083-22117
- FIPS code: 36-22117
- GNIS feature ID: 0978918
- Wikimedia Commons: East Greenbush, New York
- Website: eastgreenbush.org

East Greenbush is a town in Rensselaer County, New York, United States. It is a suburb of Albany. The population was 16,748 at the 2020 census. The word Greenbush is derived from the Dutch het groen bosch, referring to the pine woods that originally covered the land. The first settlement of the land now known as East Greenbush was made by tenants under patroon Kiliaen van Rensselaer circa 1630. The town was established in 1855 as Clinton, and was renamed in 1858. It is mostly suburban along its major highways and rural in the southwestern and northeastern corners.

I-90 traverses the town. It contains the western (or southern) terminus of US 4 and the northern terminus of NY 9J; as well as US 9 and US 20. The latter run concurrently, under the name Columbia Turnpike, which is often referred to by the locals as "9 and 20."

== History ==
East Greenbush, at the time part of the Town of Greenbush, was part of the Manor of Rensselaerswyck, and then of Albany County, prior to the creation of Rensselaer County in 1791. The town of Clinton was established on February 23, 1855, from the town of Greenbush at the same time as the town of North Greenbush. On April 14, 1858, the town name was changed to East Greenbush by New York State Laws of 1858, Chapter 194.

Early European settlement along the Hudson River shoreline took place circa 1628-1629 and in 1669, a fort was built on Papscanee Island. The hamlet of East Greenbush was settled around 1630, with a Dutch Reformed church first built in 1787, and a post office was established in 1845. From the late 18th century until his death in 1834, Prospect Hill on Hays Road in the southern section of the town was home to Edmond-Charles Genêt, former adjutant-general, minister plenipotentiary, and consul-general to the United States representing France; and as an American citizen he was a New York state legislator from Rensselaer County and a major-general in the state militia.

The town's main thoroughfares are quite old, starting with the old post roads constructed during the French and Indian Wars by the English. The Boston and Albany Turnpike was constructed in 1800, today known as the Columbia Turnpike designated as US Routes 9 and 20. Another major highway in the town, the Farmer's Turnpike, also was built at or before this time; today it is NY Route 9J.

The town saw at least one memorable event during the Anti-Rent War, which was a popular revolt among tenants of the last patroon of Rensselaerswyck over rent payments. A deputy sheriff named Griggs was killed in the line of duty while evicting a man by the name of Witbeck from his farm. The area of East Greenbush behind the Town Hall was the site of a huge cantonment, occupied by over 5,000 soldiers during the War of 1812; this included a hospital, barracks, and an arsenal. Along the Hudson River, near Papscanee Island, in the mid-late 19th century a large farm was occupied by Colonel Kiliaen van Rensselaer, great-grandson of his namesake and first Patroon of Rensselaerswyck, Kiliaen van Rensselaer.

In the late 1980s, the descendants of the original Dutch settlers on Papscanee Island came under pressure from suburban development in the area, and the Open Space Institute purchased large parcels of land and development rights to surrounding areas, creating the Papscanee Preserve.] In 1997, the county took charge of management and the park has been developed with informational signs, trails, picnic areas, and a central theme dedicated to the Mohican natives of the areas.

The John Carner Jr. House and Craver Farmstead are listed on the National Register of Historic Places.

== Geography ==
According to the United States Census Bureau, the town has a total area of 24.4 square miles (63.1 km^{2}), of which 24.1 square miles (62.4 km^{2}) is land and 0.2 square mile (0.6 km^{2}) is water.

The western section of the town, along the Hudson River is marked by bluffs that rise to an elevation of between 100 and 300 feet. The little flat land that exists along the river is on the Papscanee Island. Papscanee Island is actually a peninsula, separated from the rest of the town by the Papscanee Creek. The town then spreads out as rolling hills rising towards the east. Mill Creek (formerly Tierken Kill) and Morden Creek are the principal streams of the town.

East Greenbush is bordered by the town of North Greenbush to the north, the town of Sand Lake to the east, and the town of Schodack to the south. To the west the town borders the city of Rensselaer from the North Greenbush line to the southern tip of the city, then East Greenbush's border is with Albany County town of Bethlehem, the border being in the middle of the Hudson River.

== Notable people ==
- Citizen Genêt, French ambassador to the United States during the French revolution
- Solomon Van Rensselaer, politician, United States representative, lieutenant colonel during the War of 1812, postmaster of Albany
- James Gage, soldier who fought in the War of 1812; the Battle of Stoney Creek, a major British victory, took place on his farm.
- Mary Edmonia Lewis, sculptor
- Steven Owens, member of the Massachusetts House of Representatives
- Ernie Stautner, professional football player for the Pittsburgh Steelers (1950–1963)
- Wavy Gravy, entertainer and peace activist known for his prominent role at Woodstock
- Rich Romer, professional football player for the Cincinnati Bengals
- Jennifer Farley, television personality known for MTV's Jersey Shore
- Brian and Matt Lashoff, siblings and professional hockey players who have each played in the NHL
- Kevin Smith, professional baseball player for the New York Yankees

== Notable incidents ==
On February 9, 2004, Jon W. Romano, then 16 and a student at Columbia High School, fired three rounds with a 12-gauge shotgun. One teacher, Michael Bennett, was injured in the leg when Romano fired the gun when he was rushed and tackled by Bennett and then Assistant Principal John Sawchuck. He was sentenced to 20 years in prison, and the sentence was upheld on appeal in 2007.

On January 10, 2009, The New York State Police stopped a taxi cab for speeding on Interstate 90 in East Greenbush, westbound between exits 10 and 9. When the trooper approached the vehicle, a passenger in the taxi opened fire with a high powered AK-47, prompting a massive police response. The suspect was eventually shot by police and later died from his injuries at Albany Medical Center in Albany, New York. The suspect was travelling from Massachusetts to Albany, it was never discovered what his motives or intentions were.

== Demographics ==
Historical population
Census	Pop.	Note	%±
1860	1,607		—
1870	1,845		14.8%
1880	2,127		15.3%
1890	2,171		2.1%
1900	2,036		−6.2%
1910	1,350		−33.7%
1920	1,558		15.4%
1930	3,267		109.7%
1940	4,550		39.3%
1950	6,338		39.3%
1960	9,107		43.7%
1970	10,679		17.3%
1980	12,913		20.9%
1990	14,076		9.0%
2000	15,560		10.5%
2010	16,473		5.9%
2020	16,748		1.7%
U.S. Decennial Census

According to the 2000 census, there were 15,560 people, 6,084 households, and 4,185 families residing in the town. The ethnic composition of the town was 94.01% White, 2.85% Black or African American, 0.13% Native American, 1.94% Asian, 0.02% Pacific Islander, 0.29% from other races, and 0.76% from two or more races. Hispanic or Latino of any race were 1.33% of the population. The estimated median household income in 2016 was $93,984, an increase from $62,250 in 2000. The average salary for males is $61,819, and the average salary for females is $54,213.

== Education ==
The East Greenbush Central School District comprises five public elementary schools (Bell Top Elementary School, in North Greenbush, Genêt Elementary, Green Meadow Elementary School, Red Mill Elementary School, and Donald P. Sutherland Elementary School), a private Catholic school (Holy Spirit School), and a Montessori school (Woodland Hill Montessori School), a middle school (Howard L. Goff Middle School), and a high school (Columbia High School).

== Library ==
The East Greenbush Community Library serves nearly thirty-thousand patrons in a chartered district which includes the town of East Greenbush and portions of the town of Schodack. The library is a member of the Upper Hudson Library System, a resource-sharing consortium consisting of twenty-nine public libraries in the counties of Albany and Rensselaer. In 2001, the library moved from the East Greenbush Town Hall to its current location on Michael Rd.

== Communities and locations in or near East Greenbush ==
- August Gate — A large neighborhood on Red Mill Road (NY 151) west of Couse Corners, accessed via Robert Lane.
- Avian Meadows — A neighborhood west of Best on Best Road, north of Werking Rd, accessed via Avian Drive.
- Best — A hamlet in the northeastern part of the town, near the eastern town line at the junction of Best and Best–Luther roads (CR 53 and CR 55).
- Clinton Heights — A suburban neighborhood in the western part of the town.
- Clinton Park — A suburban neighborhood located along Sherwood Avenue, west of Hampton Manor.
- Couse Corners — A hamlet located at the junction of US 4 and NY 151, north of the hamlet of East Greenbush.
- East Greenbush — a hamlet and designated place located on the Columbia Turnpike (US 9 / US 20) near its junction with US 4.
- Governors' Square East — A neighborhood belonging to a home owners' association, located along 3rd Avenue Extension, accessed via Rockefeller Boulevard and Plaza Avenue.
- Hampton Manor — A suburban hamlet and census-designated place in the western part of the town.
- Luther — A hamlet on Route 151 and east of East Greenbush and south of Best.
- Onderdonk Estates — A large neighborhood located along Columbia Turnpike (US 9 / US 20), located east of Hampton Manor and west of Sherwood Park.
- Plaza View — A neighborhood located along 3rd Avenue Extension, east of the Rensselaer City/East Greenbush town line.
- Prospect Heights — A suburban neighborhood in the western part of the town.
- Sherwood Park — A suburban neighborhood south of Columbia Turnpike (US 9 / US 20) and west of Phillips Road (CR 57).
- Woodland Park — A suburban neighborhood south of Columbia Turnpike (US 9 / US 20) and east of Phillips Road (CR 57).
