= Rensselaer County, New York =

County in New York, United States

- County
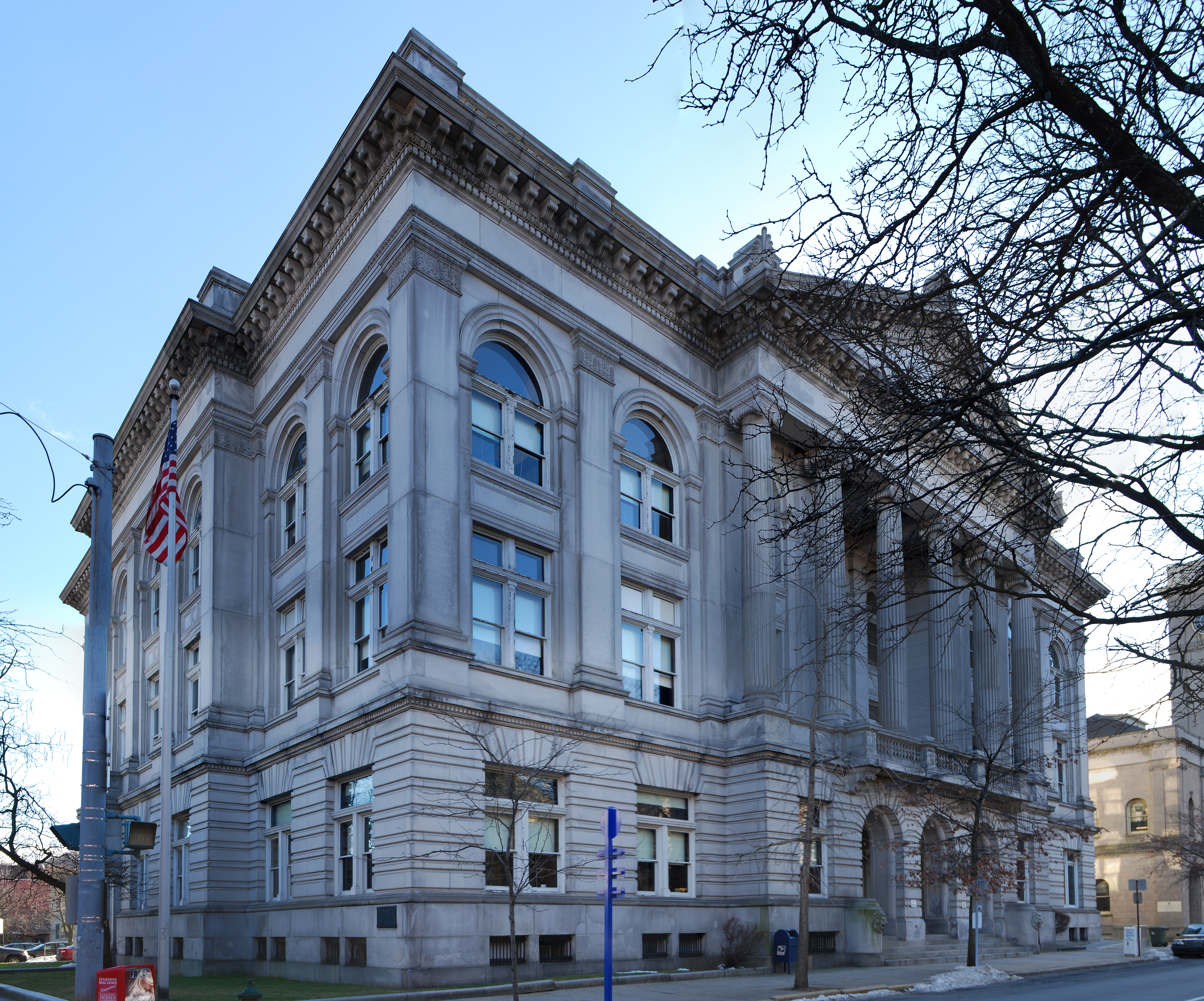
- Rensselaer County Courthouse

- Flag Seal

- Location within the U.S. state of New York
- Coordinates: 42°42′36″N 73°29′24″W
- Country: United States
- State: New York
- Founded: February 7, 1791; 235 years ago (Note: "On February 7, 1791, a subdivision of the original Albany County was made and given the name of one of the famous families of the State, Rensselaer.")
- Named for: Kiliaen van Rensselaer
- Seat: Troy
- Largest city: Troy

Area
  - Total: 665 sq mi (1,720 km^{2})
  - Land: 652 sq mi (1,690 km^{2})
  - Water: 13 sq mi (34 km^{2}) 1.9%

Population (2020)
  - Total: 161,130
  - Estimate (2025): 160,510 ▼
  - Density: 247/sq mi (95/km^{2})
- Time zone: UTC−5 (Eastern)
  - Summer (DST): UTC−4 (EDT)
- Congressional districts: 19th, 20th
- Website: www.rensco.com

Rensselaer County /rɛnsəˈlɪər/ ren-sə-LEER is a county in the U.S. state of New York. As of the 2020 census, the population was 161,130, its highest decennial count ever. Its county seat is Troy. The county is named in honor of the family of Kiliaen van Rensselaer, the original Dutch owner of the land in the area. The county is part of the Capital District region of the state.

Rensselaer County is part of the Albany-Schenectady-Troy, NY Metropolitan Statistical Area.

== History ==
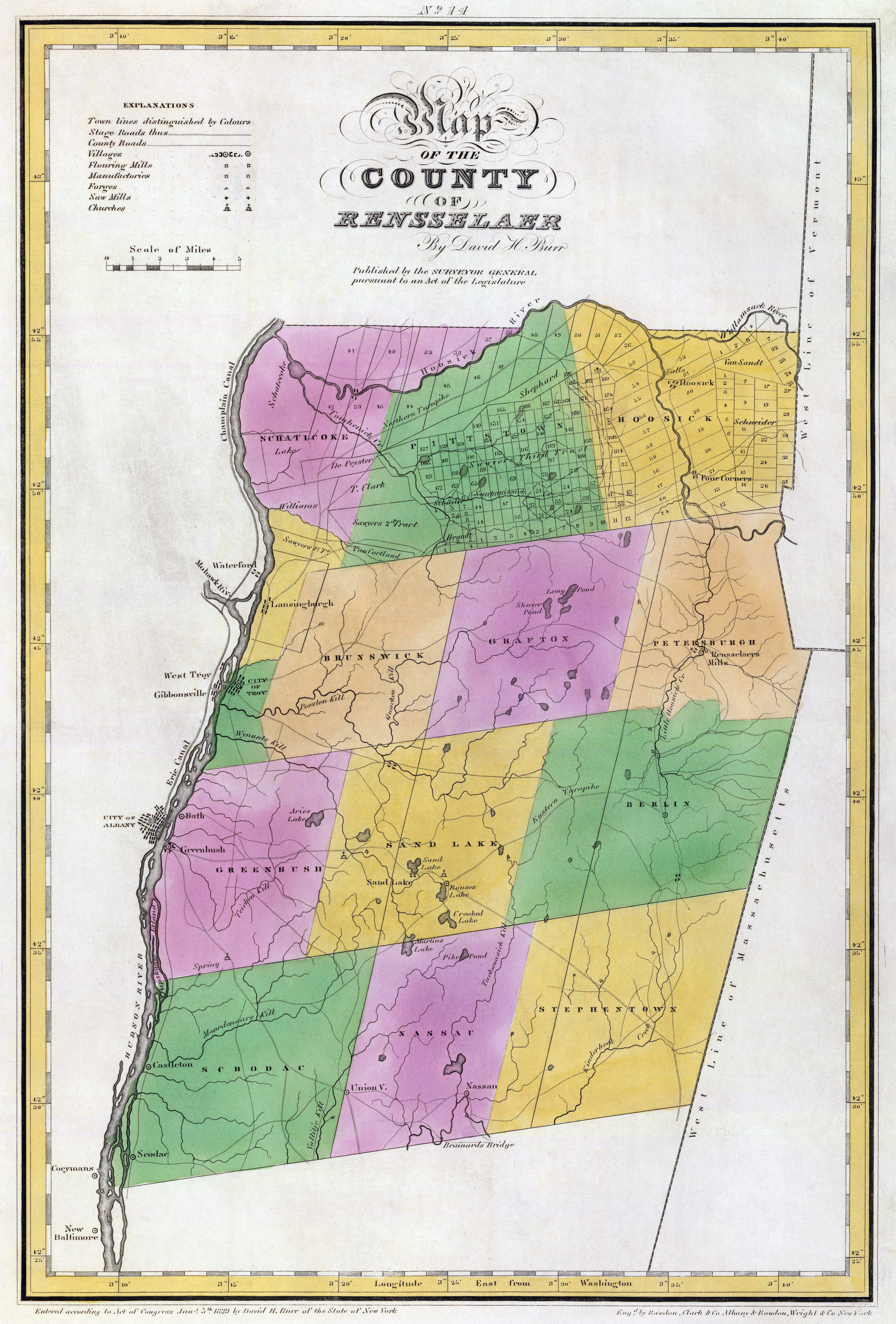
Map of Rensselaer County in 1829

The area that is now Rensselaer County was inhabited by the Algonquian-speaking Mohican Indian tribe at the time of European encounter. Kiliaen van Rensselaer, a Dutch jeweler and merchant, purchased the area in 1630 and incorporated it in his patroonship Rensselaerswyck. (It was part of the Dutch colony New Netherland).

The land passed into English rule in 1664; the Dutch regained control in 1673, but the English took it back in 1674. Until 1776, the year of American independence, the county was under English or British control. The county was not organized as a legal entity until after the Revolution, in 1791, when it was created from an area that was originally part of the very large Albany County.

In 1807, in a county re-organization, the rural sections of Troy were set off as Towns, and the city was incorporated. The two towns created were Brunswick (named for Duke Friedrich Wilhelm of Braunschweig-Lüneburg) and Grafton (named for Henry FitzRoy, 5th Duke of Grafton). A third town, Philipstown, was set off in 1806. In 1808, it was renamed Nassau after the duke of that area.

== Geography ==
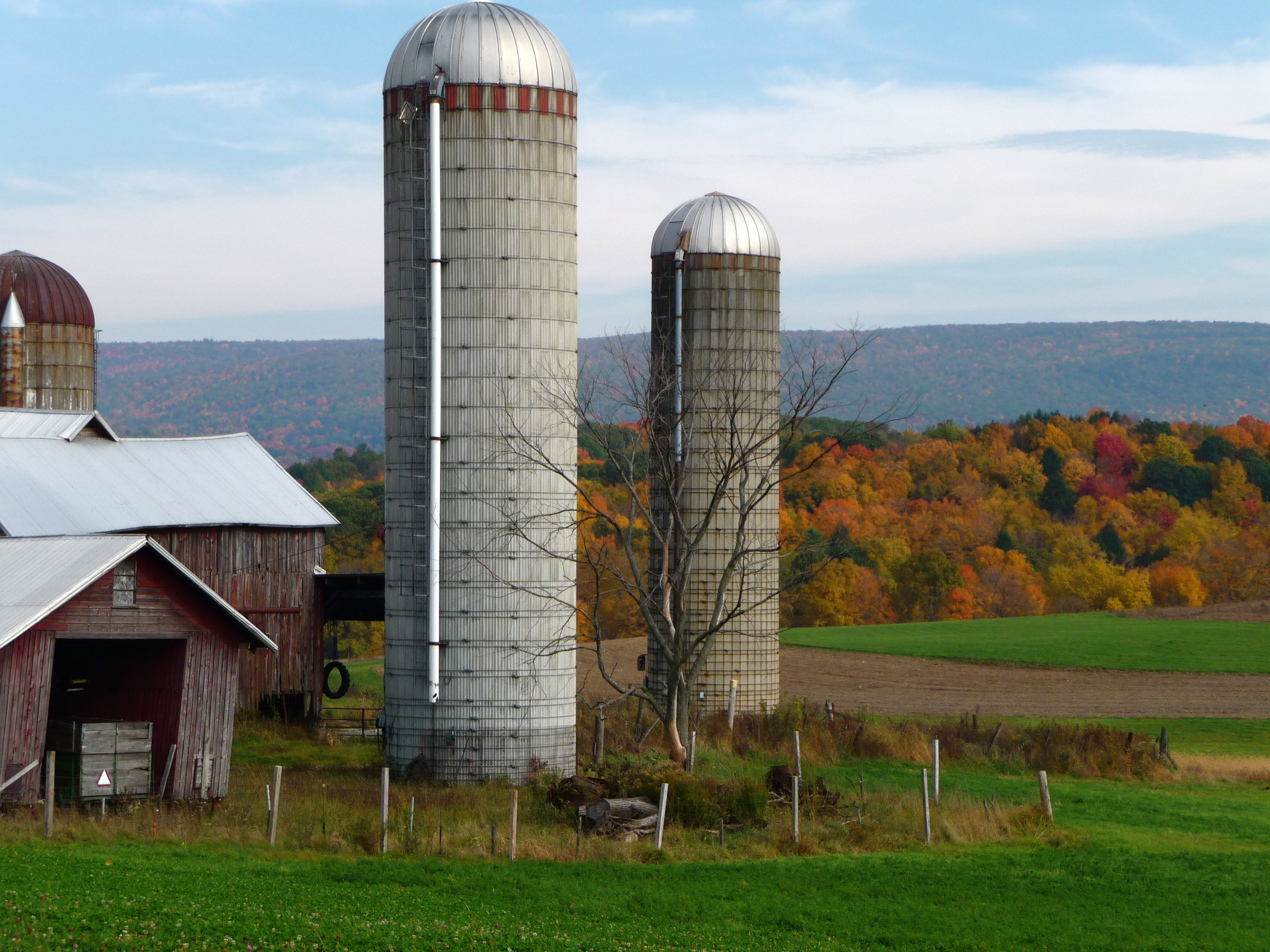
A farm in Brunswick

According to the U.S. Census Bureau, the county has a total area of 665 square miles (1,720 km^{2}), of which 652 square miles (1,690 km^{2}) is land and 13 square miles (34 km^{2}) (1.9%) is water.

Rensselaer County is located in the far eastern part of New York State. The eastern boundary of the county runs along the New York–Vermont and New York–Massachusetts borders.

The terrain runs from level and flat near the Hudson and then rises into the Rensselaer Plateau around Poestenkill and Sand Lake, then to the Taconic Mountains along the Massachusetts state line.

The highest point is Berlin Mountain, 2,818 feet (859 m) above sea level, in the town of Berlin. The lowest point is 62 feet (19 m) above sea level at the Hudson River's southernmost extent in the county.

The Hoosic River, a tributary of the Hudson River, is in the northern part of the county.

Depending on precise location within the county, road travel distance to New York City ranges between 132 and 178 miles (212 and 286 km).

== Adjacent counties ==
- Washington County — north
- Bennington County, Vermont — northeast
- Berkshire County, Massachusetts — east
- Columbia County — south
- Greene County — southwest
- Albany County — west
- Saratoga County — northwest

== Demographics ==
Historical population
Census	Pop.	Note	%±
1800	30,442		—
1810	36,309		19.3%
1820	40,153		10.6%
1830	49,424		23.1%
1840	60,259		21.9%
1850	73,363		21.7%
1860	86,328		17.7%
1870	99,549		15.3%
1880	115,328		15.9%
1890	124,511		8.0%
1900	121,697		−2.3%
1910	122,276		0.5%
1920	113,129		−7.5%
1930	119,781		5.9%
1940	121,834		1.7%
1950	132,607		8.8%
1960	142,585		7.5%
1970	152,510		7.0%
1980	151,966		−0.4%
1990	154,429		1.6%
2000	152,538		−1.2%
2010	159,429		4.5%
2020	161,130		1.1%
2025 (est.)	160,510	▼	−0.4%
U.S. Decennial Census; 1790-1960 1900-1990; 1990-2000 2010-2020

|estyear=2023 |estimate=159305 |estref=

=== 2020 census ===
Rensselaer County, New York – Racial and ethnic composition Note: the US Census treats Hispanic/Latino as an ethnic category. This table excludes Latinos from the racial categories and assigns them to a separate category. Hispanics/Latinos may be of any race.
Race / Ethnicity (NH = Non-Hispanic)	Pop 1980	Pop 1990	Pop 2000	Pop 2010	Pop 2020	% 1980	% 1990	% 2000	% 2010	% 2020
White alone (NH)	145,390	144,946	137,562	136,555	124,600	95.67%	93.86%	90.18%	85.65%	77.33%
Black or African American alone (NH)	4,038	5,024	6,870	9,592	11,800	2.66%	3.25%	4.50%	6.02%	7.32%
Native American or Alaska Native alone (NH)	175	269	306	283	310	0.12%	0.17%	0.20%	0.18%	0.19%
Asian alone (NH)	818	2,177	2,595	3,469	5,711	0.54%	1.41%	1.70%	2.18%	3.54%
Native Hawaiian or Pacific Islander alone (NH)	x	x	19	25	17	x	x	0.01%	0.02%	0.01%
Other race alone (NH)	393	149	233	241	706	0.26%	0.10%	0.15%	0.15%	0.44%
Mixed race or Multiracial (NH)	x	x	1,728	3,184	8,504	x	x	1.13%	2.00%	5.28%
Hispanic or Latino (any race)	1,152	1,864	3,225	6,080	9,482	0.76%	1.21%	2.11%	3.81%	5.88%
Total	151,966	154,429	152,538	159,429	161,130	100.00%	100.00%	100.00%	100.00%	100.00%

=== 2010 census ===
As of the census of 2010, there were 159,429 people, 62,694 households, and 39,989 families residing in the county. The population density was 233 inhabitants per square mile (90/km^{2}). There were 69,120 housing units at an average density of 109 units per square mile (42/km^{2}). The racial makeup of the county was 88.73% White, 7.14% Black or African American, 0.23% Native American, 1.71% Asian, 0.02% Pacific Islander, 0.89% from other races, and 1.34% from two or more races. 5.01% of the population were Hispanic or Latino of any race. 22.3% were of Irish, 14.7% Italian, 12.8% German, 7.5% English, 6.2% French, 5.3% American and 2.3% Puerto Rican ancestry according to Census 2010. 95.4% spoke English and 2.7% Spanish as their first language.

There were 61,094 households, out of which 33.30% had children under the age of 18 living with them, 46.80% were married couples living together, 12.00% had a female householder with no husband present, and 34.80% were non-families. 27.90% of all households were made up of individuals, and 10.30% had someone living alone who was 65 years of age or older. The average household size was 2.46 and the average family size was 3.02.

In the county, the population was spread out, with 24.20% under the age of 18, 10.10% from 18 to 24, 29.10% from 25 to 44, 23.00% from 45 to 64, and 13.60% who were 65 years of age or older. The median age was 37 years. For every 100 females there were 95.90 males. For every 100 females age 18 and over, there were 93.70 males.

The median income for a household in the county was $42,905, and the median income for a family was $52,864. Males had a median income of $36,666 versus $28,153 for females. The per capita income for the county was $21,095. About 6.70% of families and 9.50% of the population were below the poverty line, including 11.90% of those under age 18 and 6.60% of those age 65 or over.

== Government and politics ==
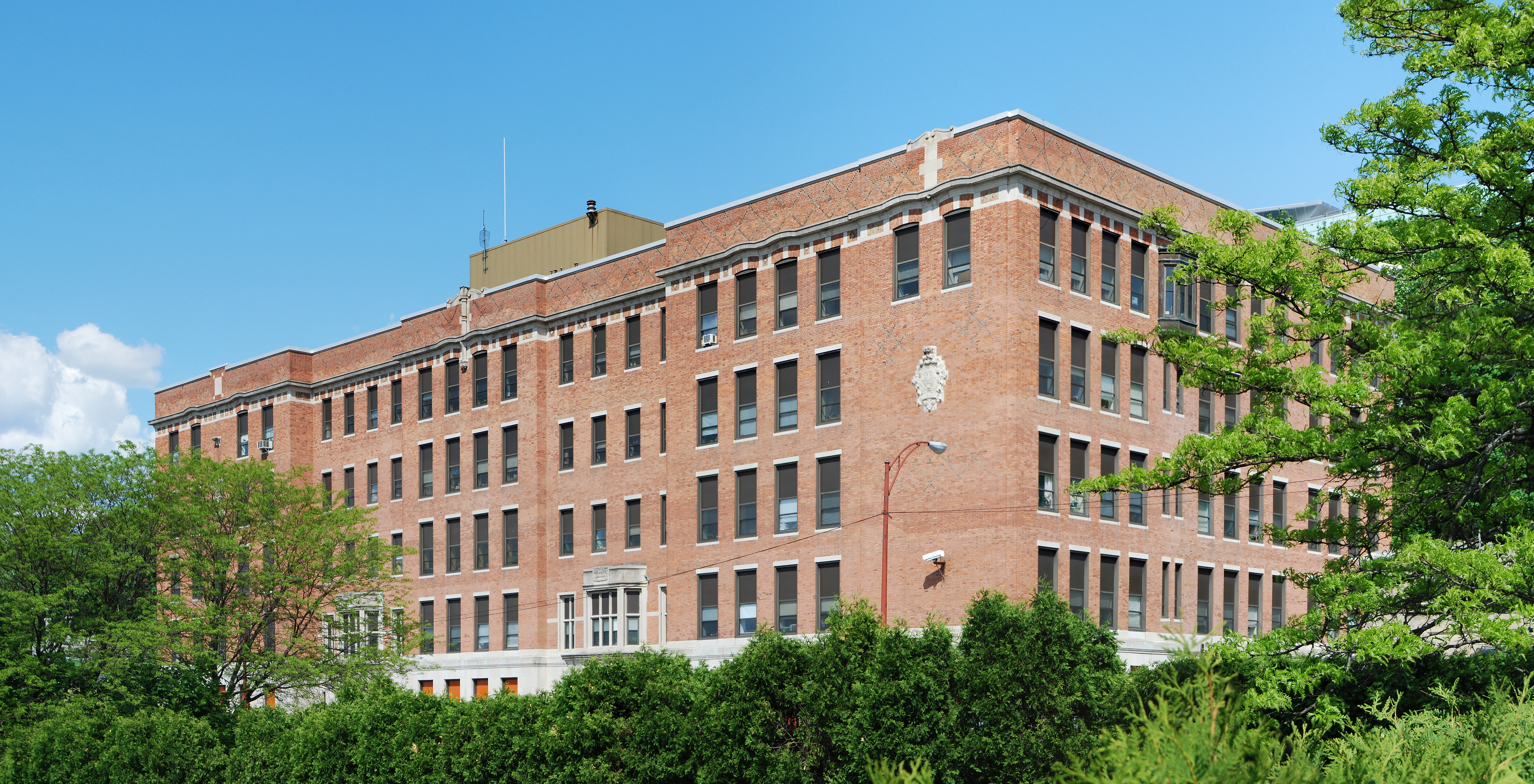
Rensselaer County Office building, which houses county offices, including that of the County Executive

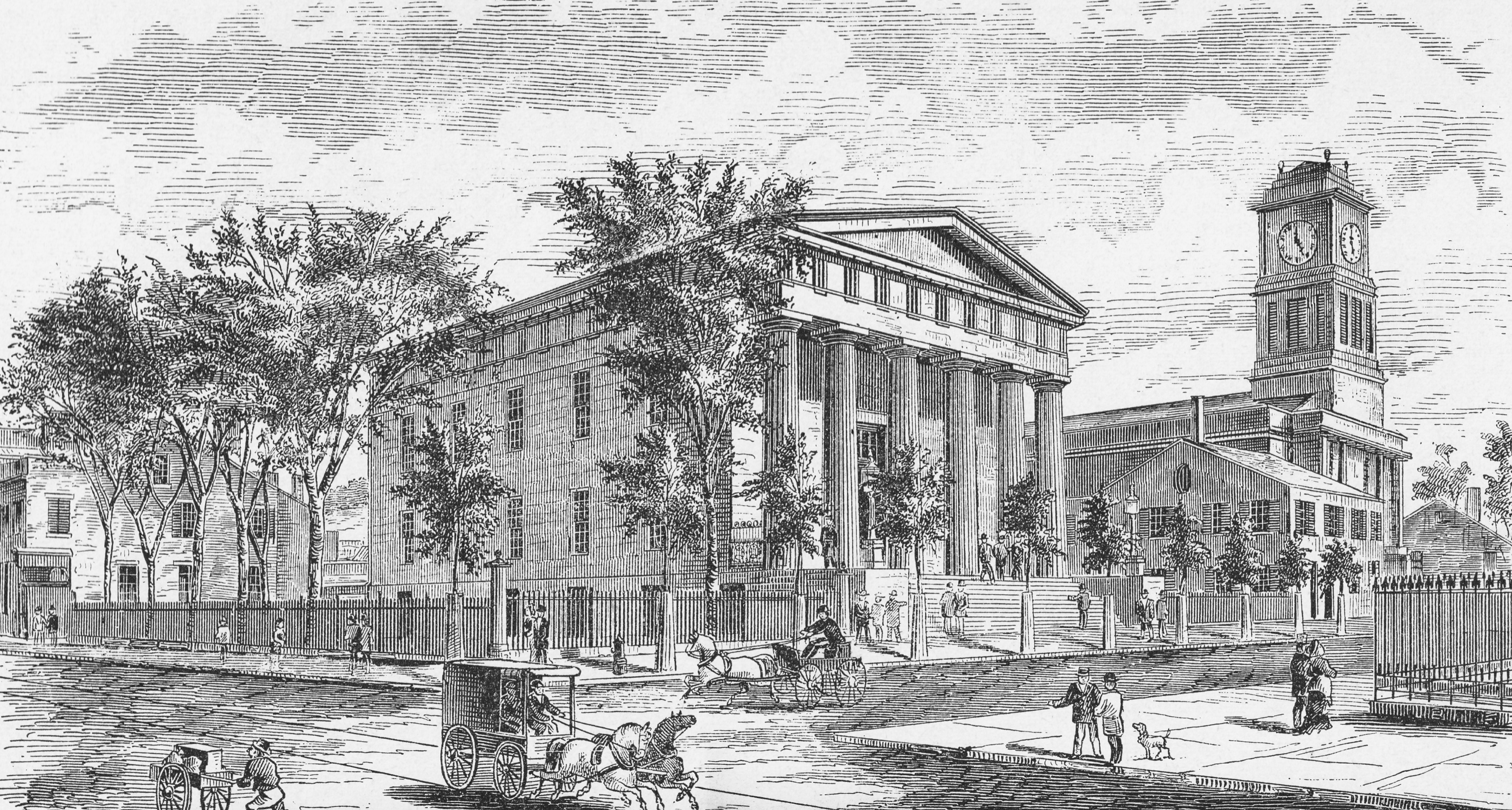
Rensselaer County Courthouse, located on the corner of Congress and 2nd Streets in Troy

United States presidential election results for Rensselaer County, New York
Year	Republican		Democratic		Third party(ies)	
Year	No.	%	No.	%	No.	%
1884	13,759	48.66%	13,414	47.44%	1,102	3.90%
1888	15,718	49.62%	15,410	48.65%	549	1.73%
1892	13,666	45.64%	14,879	49.69%	1,397	4.67%
1896	17,221	55.71%	13,119	42.44%	574	1.86%
1900	17,228	55.03%	13,464	43.01%	614	1.96%
1904	17,631	56.72%	12,529	40.31%	925	2.98%
1908	17,196	54.92%	13,162	42.04%	953	3.04%
1912	10,853	39.48%	11,684	42.50%	4,954	18.02%
1916	14,968	51.21%	13,822	47.29%	440	1.51%
1920	28,810	56.08%	20,224	39.37%	2,337	4.55%
1924	30,549	55.88%	19,783	36.18%	4,341	7.94%
1928	32,370	48.90%	33,094	50.00%	727	1.10%
1932	30,606	47.66%	32,783	51.05%	828	1.29%
1936	34,772	50.67%	31,754	46.27%	2,095	3.05%
1940	39,648	54.97%	32,387	44.90%	97	0.13%
1944	37,819	55.51%	30,173	44.29%	139	0.20%
1948	40,375	56.71%	28,468	39.98%	2,354	3.31%
1952	51,453	66.57%	25,734	33.29%	109	0.14%
1956	55,186	72.90%	20,516	27.10%	0	0.00%
1960	40,124	52.59%	36,109	47.33%	61	0.08%
1964	20,814	28.88%	51,170	71.01%	76	0.11%
1968	34,674	50.49%	30,232	44.02%	3,775	5.50%
1972	48,864	66.87%	24,019	32.87%	188	0.26%
1976	40,229	57.76%	28,979	41.60%	445	0.64%
1980	32,005	45.89%	29,880	42.84%	7,862	11.27%
1984	43,892	61.94%	26,755	37.76%	217	0.31%
1988	35,412	51.18%	33,066	47.79%	719	1.04%
1992	28,937	38.80%	29,793	39.95%	15,850	21.25%
1996	23,482	34.72%	34,273	50.68%	9,870	14.60%
2000	29,562	43.20%	34,808	50.86%	4,066	5.94%
2004	34,734	47.90%	36,075	49.75%	1,705	2.35%
2008	32,840	44.39%	39,753	53.73%	1,393	1.88%
2012	29,113	42.77%	37,408	54.96%	1,540	2.26%
2016	33,726	47.13%	32,717	45.72%	5,119	7.15%
2020	36,500	45.96%	40,969	51.59%	1,940	2.44%
2024	38,601	48.77%	39,668	50.11%	885	1.12%

From 1884 through the 1988 campaign, voters in Rensselaer County chiefly supported the Republican presidential candidate. From the 1992 presidential election until present, voters supported the Democratic candidate, with the exception of 2016.

Beginning in 1791, Rensselaer County was governed by a Board of Supervisors, which acted as the Legislature, with the chairman of the board serving as a de facto Executive. The Board of Supervisors form of government was terminated as a result of a class action lawsuit brought by Troy attorney Marvin I. Honig on behalf of his wife, Nedda, during March 1968. Mr. Honig brought this lawsuit to declare that the Board of Supervisors, as constituted, violated the "one man, one vote" principal declared by the United States Supreme Court. Mr. Honig's motive in bringing the lawsuit was to punish the Rensselaer County Republican Party chairman and certain members of the Board of Supervisors for defaulting on an agreement with him. The NY Supreme Court ruled in Honig's favor, and ordered the creation of a legislative body. Several plans were offered, but a plan proposed by Honig was adopted by the Court, and its decision was affirmed by the Appellate Division and Court of Appeals. The first "Honig Plan" was drawn to favor the Democratic party, which had not had control of the county government in decades. That plan, which controlled the 1969 election, resulted in the Democrats winning control of the new Rensselaer County Legislature. Thereafter, following a change of leadership in the Republican party, Honig brought a new plan, drawn to favor Republican candidates, to the court, which adopted his revised plan. The second "Honig Plan" was affirmed by the Appellate Division and the Court of Appeals. The Republican candidates won back the County Legislature in the 1971 election, and Honig became the Renssselaer County Attorney, a position he held for well over a decade. A full explanation of the creation of the Rensselaer County Legislature can be found in the November 2021 entry at nassau-stories.blogspot.com See also: The Troy Record, July 8, 1971, page 1.

In 1970, the Rensselaer County Legislature was created, which elected Edward J. "Ned" Quinn as chairman. The chairman served as the equivalent to an executive until the office of County Executive was created in 1972. Since its creation, Democrats have never won the office, although they controlled the Legislature until 1994. One notable candidate for Executive was Edward Pattison who was later elected to Congress, and whose son Mark served two terms as Mayor of Troy. The current county executive is Steve McLaughlin (R).

Legislative authority is vested in the County Legislature, which consists of 19 members representing 16 different communities, separated into six legislative districts. The current composition of the Legislature is as follows (ten Republicans, eight Democrats, and one Conservative who caucuses with the Republicans):

District 1 – City of Troy:

- Jessica Ashley (D)
- Mark J. Fleming (D), Minority Leader
- Gary Galuski (D)
- Nina M. Nichols (D), Deputy Minority Leader
- Carole C. Weaver (D)
- Ken Zalewski (D)

District 2 – East Greenbush, North Greenbush, and Poestenkill:

- Robert W. Bayly (R), Vice Chairperson for Finance
- Thomas Grant (R)
- Kelly Hoffman (C), Chairwoman
- Mary Frances Sabo (D)

District 3 – Brunswick, Pittstown, and Schaghticoke:

- Dan Casale (R)
- Kenneth H. Herrington (R), Majority Leader
- William Maloney (R)

District 4 – Nassau, Sand Lake, and Schodack:

- Wayne Gendron (R)
- Thomas Choquette (R)
- Robert R. Loveridge (R), Vice Chairperson

District 5 – Berlin, Grafton, Hoosick, Hoosick Falls, Petersburgh, and Stephentown:

- Bruce Patire (R)
- Jeffrey Wysocki (R)

District 6 – City of Rensselaer:

- Lark Barnett Rutecki (D)

Rensselaer County Executives
Name	Party	Term
William J. Murphy	Republican	January 1, 1974 – December 31, 1985
John L. Buono	Republican	January 1, 1986 – May 1995
Henry F. Zwack	Republican	May 1995 – May 13, 2001
Kathleen M. Jimino	Republican	May 2001 – December 31, 2017
Steven F. McLaughlin	Republican	January 1, 2018 – present

As of 2024 the current sheriff is Kyle Bourgault. His predecessor, Patrick A. Russo, was notable for becoming the first sheriff in the state to embrace Immigration and Nationality Act Section 287(g), which authorizes local and county law enforcement to detain undocumented immigrants.

== Education ==
The county is serviced by 16 school districts. Some are completely contained in the county while some cross county lines into other counties. No school districts cross either the Vermont or Massachusetts state borders. Below is a table that shows the districts within the county, which BOCES they belong to, and which other counties they may serve.

District	BOCES	Other counties district serves
Averill Park Central School District	Questar III	None
Berlin Central School District	Questar III	None
Brunswick (Brittonkill) Central School District	Questar III	None
Cambridge Central School District	WSWHE BOCES	Washington County
East Greenbush Central School District	Questar III	Columbia County
Hoosic Valley Central School District	Questar III	Washington County
Hoosick Falls Central School District	N/A	Washington County
Ichabod Crane Central School District	Questar III	Columbia County
Lansingburgh Central School District	Questar III	None
Mechanicville City School District	WSWHE BOCES	Saratoga County
New Lebanon Central School District	Questar III	Columbia County
North Greenbush Common School District	Questar III	None
Rensselaer City School District	Questar III	None
Schodack Central School District	Questar III	Columbia County
Troy City School District	Capital Region Boces	None
Wynantskill Union Free School District	Questar III	None

The private, coeducational Doane Stuart School is also located in Rensselaer County.

The county is also home to Rensselaer Polytechnic Institute, the oldest operating technological college in America.

== Communities ==
Map of towns, cities and villages within Rensselaer County

=== Larger Settlements ===
#	Location	Population	Type
1	Troy†	51,401	City
2	Rensselaer	9,210	City
3	East Greenbush	6,266	CDP
4	Hampton Manor	5,423	CDP
5	Wynantskill	4,050	CDP
6	Hoosick Falls	3,216	Village
7	West Sand Lake	2,616	CDP
8	Averill Park	2,098	CDP
9	Castleton-on-Hudson (Castleton)	1,477	Village
10	Nassau	1,103	Village
11	Poestenkill	1,020	CDP
12	Nassau Lake	1,004	CDP
13	East Nassau	559	Village
14	Schaghticoke	527	Village
15	Valley Falls	510	Village

† - County seat

=== Towns ===
- Berlin
- Brunswick
- East Greenbush
- Grafton
- Hoosick
- Nassau
- North Greenbush
- Petersburgh
- Pittstown
- Poestenkill
- Sand Lake
- Schaghticoke
- Schodack
- Stephentown

=== Hamlets ===
- Cherry Plain
- Cropseyville
- Defreestville
- Eagle Bridge
- East Schodack
- Johnsonville
- Melrose
- Schodack Center
- Speigletown
- Taborton
- Wyomanock

== See also ==
- List of counties in New York
- List of county routes in Rensselaer County, New York
- National Register of Historic Places listings in Rensselaer County, New York
