= Fitz Hugh Ludlow =

Author of "The Hasheesh Eater", journalist, addiction researcher

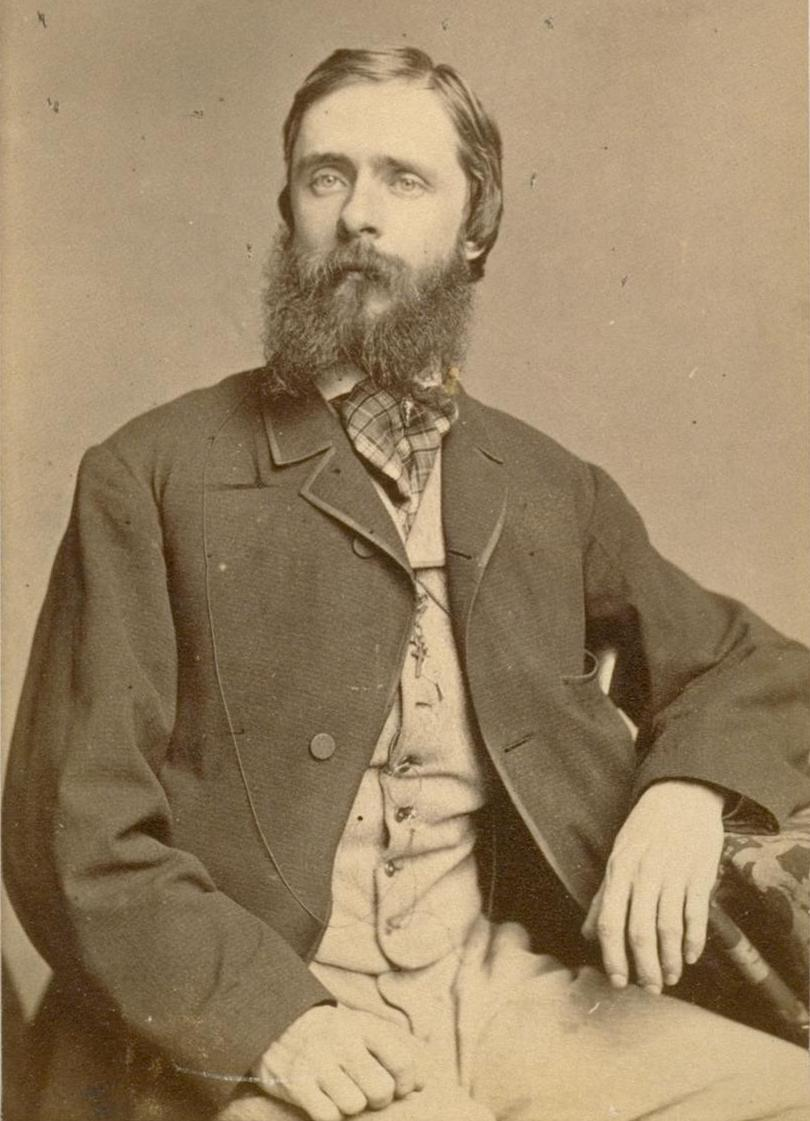
Fitz Hugh Ludlow

Fitz Hugh Ludlow, sometimes seen as Fitzhugh Ludlow (September 11, 1836 – September 12, 1870), was an American author, journalist, and explorer; best known for his autobiographical book The Hasheesh Eater (1857).

Ludlow also wrote about his travels across America on the overland stage to San Francisco, Yosemite and the forests of California and Oregon in his second book, The Heart of the Continent. An appendix to it provides his impressions of the recently founded Mormon settlement in Utah.

He was also the author of many works of short fiction, essays, science reporting and art criticism. He devoted many of the last years of his life to attempts to improve the treatment of opiate addicts, becoming a pioneer in both progressive approaches dealing with addiction and the public portrayal of its sufferers. Though of modest means, he was imprudently generous in aiding those unable to cope with drug-induced life struggles.

Ludlow died prematurely at the age of 34 from the accumulated effect of his lifelong addictions, the ravages of pneumonia and tuberculosis, and overwork.

== Early life ==
Ludlow was born September 11, 1836, in New York City, where his family made their home. His father, the Rev. Henry G. Ludlow, was an outspoken abolitionist minister at a time when anti-slavery enthusiasm was not popular in the urban North. Only months before his birth, Fitz Hugh later wrote, "my father, mother, and sister were driven from their house in New York by a furious mob. When they came cautiously back, their home was quiet as a fortress the day after it has been blown up. The front-parlor was full of paving-stones; the carpets were cut to pieces; the pictures, the furniture, and the chandelier lay in one common wreck; and the walls were covered with inscriptions of mingled insult and glory. Over the mantel-piece had been charcoaled 'Rascal'; over the pier-table, 'Abolitionist.'"

His father was also a "ticket-agent on the Underground Railroad," as Ludlow discovered when he was four — although, misunderstanding the term in his youth, Ludlow remembered "going down cellar and watching behind old hogsheads by the hour to see where the cars came in."

The moral lessons learned at home were principles hard to maintain among his peers, especially when expressed with his father's exuberance.

Among the large crowd of young Southerners sent to [my] school, I began preaching emancipation in my pinafore. Mounted upon a window-seat in an alcove of the great play-hall, I passed recess after recess in haranguing a multitude upon the subject of Freedom, with as little success as most apostles, and with only less than their crowd of martyrdom, because, though small boys are more malicious than men, they cannot hit so hard.

Experiences like these may have inspired Ludlow in his first published work that has survived to this day. The poem, Truth on His Travels has "Truth" personified and wandering the earth, trying in vain to find some band of people who will respect him.

The pages of The Hasheesh Eater introduce a bookish and near-sighted young Ludlow: "into books, ill health, and musing I settled down when I should have been playing cricket, hunting, or riding. The younger thirst for adventure was quenched by rapid degrees as I found it possible to ascend Chimborazo with Humboldt lying on a sofa, or chase harte-beests with Cumming over muffins and coffee."

A family legend, later used to explain his attraction for intoxicants, is that when Ludlow was two years old he "would climb upon the breakfast table and eat Cayenne pepper from the castor!"

Henry Ludlow's father was a pioneer temperance advocate, according to one source "adopting and advocating its principles before any general and organized effort for them." Henry himself, in one of his few preserved sermons, attacked Great Britain for "her cruel oppression of her East India subjects, often starving… and forced to cultivate opium on land they need to supply themselves with bread…" and defended China "for resisting a traffick which was sapping, by its terrible effects upon her citizens, the very foundation of her empire…"

Fitz Hugh's father had obvious and enormous influence on him, with his mother playing a more marginal role in his life. Abigail Woolsey Wells died a few months after Ludlow's twelfth birthday. At her funeral, the presiding minister said that "[f]or many years she has scarcely known what physical ease and comfort were. She labored with a body prostrated and suffering; and laid herself down to sleep in pain."

His mother's suffering may have brought out in Ludlow an obsession with mortality and the connection between the spiritual and animal in man. It was observed that "through all her life [she] had a constitutional and indescribable dread of death; not so much the fear of being dead, as of dying itself. An appalling sense of the fearful struggle which separates the soul from the body."

== The college man ==
Ludlow began his studies at the College of New Jersey, today's Princeton University. Entering in 1854, he joined the Cliosophic Society, a literary and debating club. When a fire gutted Nassau Hall, the College of New Jersey's main building, a year later he transferred to Union College. There he joined the Kappa Alpha Society, the nation's first purely social collegiate fraternity, and lived with its members.

Ludlow evidently took some intensive courses in medicine at Union. As early as 1857, he writes of having been an anesthesiologist during minor surgery, and being asked by surgeons for his opinions on the actions of various courses of anesthesia.

A class in which Ludlow always got the highest marks was one taught by famed Union College president Eliphalet Nott based on Lord Kames' seminal 1762 literary work, Elements of Criticism – although it essentially became a course on Nott's own philosophy. The eccentric polymath Nott would have an influence on Ludlow, but perhaps more immediately his assertion that "[i]f I had it in my power to direct the making of songs in any country, I could do just as I pleased with the people."

In a testimony to Nott's feelings towards Ludlow's philosophy and writing talent, he asked the young man to write a song for the commencement ceremony of the Class of 1856. College legend holds that Ludlow was so unhappy with the late night lyrics he composed to the tune of the drinking song Sparkling and Bright he threw away the manuscript. Fortuitously, his roommate discovered it and brought the work to Rev. Nott's attention. Song to Old Union became the school's alma mater, and is sung at commencement to this day.

Ludlow wrote several college songs, two of which were considered the most popular Union College songs even fifty years later. In The Hasheesh Eater he says that "[h]e who should collect the college carols of our country… would be adding no mean department to the national literature… [T]hey are frequently both excellent poetry and music… [T]hey are always inspiring, always heart-blending, and always, I may add, well sung."

== The Hasheesh Eater ==
Ludlow is best known for his groundbreaking work The Hasheesh Eater, published in 1857. When, in the Song to Old Union, today's graduates sing that "the brook that bounds through Union's grounds / Gleams bright as the Delphic water…" most probably do not realize that they may be commemorating drug-induced states of vision, in which this bounding brook became alternatingly the Nile and the Styx.

Early in his college years, probably during the spring of 1854 while Ludlow was still at Princeton, his medical curiosity drew him to visit his "friend Anderson the apothecary" regularly. During these visits, Ludlow "made upon myself the trial of the effects of every strange drug and chemical which the laboratory could produce." A few months before, Bayard Taylor's Putnam's Magazine article The Vision of Hasheesh had been devoured by Ludlow, and so when the cannabis-based tetanus remedy called Tilden's extract came out he had to try some.

Ludlow became a "hasheesh eater," ingesting large doses of this cannabis extract regularly throughout his college years. Just as in his youth he found to his delight that he could from the comfort of his couch adventure along with the words of authors, he found that with hasheesh "[t]he whole East, from Greece to farthest China, lay within the compass of a township; no outlay was necessary for the journey. For the humble sum of six cents I might purchase an excursion ticket over all the earth; ships and dromedaries, tents and hospices were all contained in a box of Tilden's extract."

He found the drug to be a boon to his creativity: "[M]y pen glanced presently like lightning in the effort to keep neck and neck with my ideas," he writes at one point, although, "[a]t last, thought ran with such terrific speed that I could no longer write at all."

Although he later grew to think of cannabis as "the very witch-plant of hell, the weed of madness" and his involvement with it as unwise, "[w]herein I was wrong I was invited by a mother's voice… The motives for the hasheesh-indulgence were of the most exalted ideal nature, for of this nature are all its ecstasies and its revelations — yes, and a thousand-fold more terrible, for this very reason, its unutterable pangs."

For a time he seemed never to be out from under the influence of hashish. "[L]ife became with me one prolonged state of hasheesh exaltation…" he wrote, and noted that "the effect of every successive indulgence grows more perduring until the hitherto isolated experiences become tangent to each other; then the links of the delirium intersect, and at last so blend that the chain has become a continuous band… The final months… are passed in one unbroken yet checkered dream." He concluded:

Hasheesh is indeed an accursed drug, and the soul at last pays a most bitter price for all its ecstasies; moreover, the use of it is not the proper means of gaining any insight, yet who shall say that at that season of exaltation I did not know things as they are more truly than ever in the ordinary state?… In the jubilance of hashish, we have only arrived by an improper pathway at the secret of that infinity of beauty which shall be beheld in heaven and earth when the veil of the corporeal drops off, and we know as we are known.

Ludlow was earnest in his description of the horrors of withdrawal, adding that "[i]f, from a human distaste of dwelling too long upon the horrible, I have been led to speak so lightly of the facts of this part of my experience that any man may think the returning way of ascent an easy one, and dare the downward road of ingress, I would repair the fault with whatever of painfully-elaborated prophecy of wretchedness may be in my power, for through all this time I was indeed a greater sufferer than any bodily pain could possibly make me."

Ludlow's account was probably flavored by the tale of opium addiction which formed the model for his book: Thomas DeQuincey's Confessions of an English Opium-Eater. Ludlow's description of his physical withdrawal symptoms included terrible nightmares. He takes up tobacco smoking to help him through his "suffering," but this suffering seems mostly to be from disappointment at the dreary colors and unfantastic drudgery of sober life, rather than from any physical pain (ironically, his incipient nicotine addiction may have been the real source of any physical suffering he experienced; he writes at one point that "to defer for an hour the nicotine indulgence was to bring on a longing for the cannabine which was actual pain."):

The very existence of the outer world seemed a base mockery, a cruel sham of some remembered possibility which had been glorious with a speechless beauty. I hated flowers, for I had seen the enameled meads of Paradise; I cursed the rocks because they were mute stone, the sky because it rang with no music; and the earth and sky seemed to throw back my curse… It was not the ecstasy of the drug which so much attracted me, as its power of disenthralment from an apathy which no human aid could utterly take away.

He says in The Hasheesh Eater that through the drug, "I had caught a glimpse through the chinks of my earthly prison of the immeasurable sky which should one day overarch me with unconceived sublimity of view, and resound in my ear with unutterable music." This glimpse would haunt him for the rest of his days. A poem, preserved in his sister's notebook, reads in part: "I stand as one who from a dungeon dream / Of open air and the free arch of stars / Waking to things that be from things that seem / Beats madly on the bars. // I am not yet quite used to be aware / That all my labor & my hope had birth / Only to freeze me with the coffined share / Of void & soulless earth."

The Hasheesh Eater was written on the advice of his physician during his withdrawal. Ludlow had difficulty in finding words to describe his experiences: "In the hasheesh-eater a virtual change of worlds has taken place… Truth has not become expanded, but his vision has grown telescopic; that which others see only as the dim nebula, or do not see at all, he looks into with a penetrating scrutiny which distance, to a great extent, can not evade… To his neighbor in the natural state he turns to give expression to his visions, but finds that to him the symbols which convey the apocalypse to his own mind are meaningless, because, in our ordinary life, the thoughts which they convey have no existence; their two planes are utterly different."

Still, he made the attempt, trying on the one hand to make a moral or practical point that "the soul withers and sinks from its growth toward the true end of its being beneath the dominance of any sensual indulgence" and on the other to map out the hashish high like an explorer of a new continent: "If I shall seem to have fixed the comparative positions of even a few outposts of a strange and rarely-visited realm, I shall think myself happy."

== Entering the New York literary scene ==
The Hasheesh Eater was published when Ludlow was twenty-one years old. The book was a success, going through a few printings in short order, and Ludlow, although he published both the book and his earlier article The Apocalypse of Hasheesh anonymously, was able to take advantage of the book's notoriety.

For a time he studied law under William Curtis Noyes (himself a lawyer who had begun his legal studies at the age of fourteen in the offices of Ludlow's uncle Samuel). Ludlow passed the bar exam in New York in 1859, but he never practiced law, instead deciding to pursue a literary career.

The late 1850s marked a changing of the guard in New York City literature. Old guard literary magazines like The Knickerbocker and Putnam's Monthly were fading away, and upstarts like the Atlantic Monthly, The Saturday Press, and Vanity Fair were starting up. Ludlow took on a position as an associate editor at Vanity Fair, a magazine which at the time resembled Punch in tone. It was probably through the Vanity Fair staff that Ludlow was introduced to the New York City bohemian and literary culture, centered around Pfaff's beer cellar on Broadway and Saturday night gatherings at Richard Henry Stoddard's home. This scene attracted the likes of Walt Whitman, Fitz James O'Brien, Bayard Taylor, Thomas Bailey Aldrich, Edmund Clarence Stedman, and Artemus Ward.

New York City's vibrant literary scene and cosmopolitan attitudes were a boon to Ludlow. "It is a bath of other souls," he wrote. "It will not let a man harden inside his own epidermis. He must affect and be affected by multitudinous varieties of temperament, race, character."

New York was tolerant of iconoclasts and of people with just the sort of notoriety Ludlow had cultivated. "No amount of eccentricity surprises a New-Yorker, or makes him uncourteous. It is difficult to attract even a crowd of boys on Broadway by an odd figure, face, manner, or costume. This has the result of making New York an asylum for all who love their neighbor as themselves, but would a little rather not have him looking through the key-hole."

The late 1850s and early 1860s found Ludlow in just about every literary quarter of New York. He wrote for, among many others, the Harper's publications (Weekly, Monthly and Bazar), the New York World, Commercial Advertiser, Evening Post, and Home Journal, and for Appleton's, Vanity Fair, Knickerbocker, Northern Lights, The Saturday Press, and the Atlantic Monthly.

George William Curtis, the editor of Harper's New Monthly Magazine, remembered Ludlow as "a slight, bright-eyed, alert young man, who seemed scarcely more than a boy," when he came in for a visit. Curtis introduced Ludlow to the princes of the Harper publishing family as an upcoming literary talent who, before his twenty-fifth birthday, would have his first book go through several printings and would place more than ten stories in Harper's publications, some of which were printed serially and spanned several issues.

== Rosalie ==
Ludlow's fictional stories often mirror with fair accuracy the events of his life. One can suppose that the childlike eighteen-year-old with brown hair and eyes and "a complexion, marble struck through with rose flush" who falls for the narrator of Our Queer Papa, a young magazine sub-editor described as a "good-looking gentleman with brains, who had published," is the fictionalized Rosalie Osborne, who follows that description, and whom he would marry the year after the story's publication.

Rosalie was eighteen when she married, not particularly young by the standards of the day, but young enough in character that it would later be remembered that "she was… but a little girl when she was married." Memoirs written by members of the New York literary circle in which the Ludlows were an active part universally paint Rosalie as both very beautiful and very flirtatious. The wife of Thomas Bailey Aldrich, for instance, remembered Mrs. Ludlow as "the Dulcinea who had entangled [Aldrich] in the meshes of her brown hair."

The couple spent the first half of 1859 in Florida, where Ludlow wrote a series of articles, "Due South Sketches," describing what he later recalled as "the climate of Utopia, the scenery of Paradise, and the social system of Hell." He noted that while apologists for slavery condemned abolitionists for condoning miscegenation, "[t]he most open relations of concubinage existed between white chevaliers and black servants in the town of Jacksonville. I was not surprised at the fact, but was surprised at its openness… not even the pious shrugged their shoulders or seemed to care."

From Florida, the couple moved to New York City, staying in a boarding house and diving rapidly back into the literary social life.

== The Heart of the Continent ==
In 1863 Albert Bierstadt was at the peak of a career that would make him America's top landscape artist. Ludlow considered Bierstadt's landscapes representative of the best American art of the era and used his position as art critic at the New York Evening Post to praise them.

Bierstadt wanted to return West, where in 1859 he had found scenes for some of his recently successful paintings. He asked Ludlow to accompany him. Ludlow's writings about the trip, published in the Post, San Francisco's The Golden Era, the Atlantic Monthly and then later compiled into book form, according to one biographer of Bierstadt, "proved to be among the most effective vehicles in firmly establishing Bierstadt as the preeminent artist-interpreter of the western landscape in the 1860s."

During the overland journey, they stopped at Salt Lake City, where Ludlow found an industrious and sincere group of settlers. He brought to the city prejudice and misgiving about the Mormons, and a squeamishness about polygamy which embarrassed him almost as much as his first view of a household of multiple wives. "I, a cosmopolitan, a man of the world, liberal to other people's habits and opinions to a degree which had often subjected me to censure among strictarians in the Eastern States, blushed to my very temples," he writes.

He couldn't believe that a pair of co-wives "could sit there so demurely looking at their own and each other's babies without jumping up to tear each other's hair and scratch each other's eyes out… It would have relieved my mind… to have seen that happy family clawing each other like tigers."

His impressions of the Mormons came when Utah was seen by many of his readers back home as rebellious and dangerous as those states in the Confederacy, with which the Union was then involved in the American Civil War. Ludlow encountered frequent snide comments about the disintegration of the Union, with some Mormons under the impression that with the flood of immigrants to Utah fleeing the draft, and with the decimation of the male population in war time making polygamy seem more practical, the Mormon state would come out of the war stronger than either side. Ludlow's opinions were read with interest back East, and would constitute an appendix to the book he would later write about his travels.

"The Mormon system," wrote Ludlow, "owns its believers — they are for it, not it for them. I could not help regarding this 'Church' as a colossal steam engine which had suddenly realized its superiority over its engineers and… had declared once for all not only its independence but its despotism." Furthermore, "[i]t is very well known in Salt Lake City that no man lives there who would not be dead tomorrow if Brigham willed it so." Ludlow spent considerable time with Orrin Porter Rockwell, who had been dubbed the "Destroying Angel" for his supposed role as Brigham Young's assassin of choice. Ludlow wrote a sketch of the man which Rockwell's biographer, Harold Schindler, called "the best of those left behind by writers who observed the Mormon first-hand." Ludlow said, in part, that he "found him one of the pleasantest murderers I ever met."

Ludlow wrote that "[i]n their insane error, [the Mormons] are sincere, as I fully believe, to a much greater extent than is generally supposed. Even their leaders, for the most part, I regard not as hypocrites, but as fanatics." For instance, "Brigham Young is the farthest remove on earth from a hypocrite; he is that grand, yet awful sight in human nature, a man who has brought the loftiest Christian self-devotion to the altar of the Devil…" A warning that must have seemed especially poignant was this: "[T]he Mormon enemies of our American Idea should be plainly understood as far more dangerous antagonists than hypocrites or idiots can ever hope to be. Let us not twice commit the blunder of underrating our foes."

=== Racist opinions ===
Ludlow occasionally expressed the racial bigotry rampant throughout his day in his writings. Contrary to his progressive nature, inquiring mind, and abolitionist politics, he describes a "motherly mulatto woman" as possessing "the passive obedience of her race"; Mexicans in California as originating from "a nation of beggars-on-horseback," a melting pot of "Spaniards, Greasers, and Mixed-Breeds…;" and Chinese immigrants in "a kennel of straggling houses" which he envisions "finally… swept away from San Francisco, and that strange Semitic race… either exiled or swallowed up in our civilization…;" and deplores "the natural, ingrained laziness of the Indians."

Native Americans were a particular target of Ludlow's. He disparaged them as "copper-faced devils" and poured scorn on "the pretty, sentimental, philanthropic prayers" of contemporary literature that depicted Native Americans as "noble savages." Ludlow believed the "Indian" was subhuman — an "inconceivable devil, whom statesmen and fools treat with, but whom brave and practical men shoot and scalp."

=== San Francisco ===
During his stay in San Francisco, Ludlow was a guest of Thomas Starr King, the California preacher and public speaker.

There, Ludlow again found himself in a vibrant literary community, this time centred around the Golden Era, which published Mark Twain, Joaquin Miller and Bret Harte. Twain was at the time still a virtual unknown (he had first used the pen name "Mark Twain" in a published piece a few months before). Ludlow wrote that "[i]n funny literature, that Irresistable [sic] Washoe Giant, Mark Twain, takes quite a unique position… He imitates nobody. He is a school by himself." Twain reciprocated by asking Ludlow to preview some of his work, and wrote to his mother, "if Fitz Hugh Ludlow, (author of 'The Hasheesh Eater') comes your way, treat him well… He published a high encomium upon Mark Twain, (the same being eminently just & truthful, I beseech you to believe) in a San Francisco paper. Artemus Ward said that when my gorgeous talents were publicly acknowledged by such high authority, I ought to appreciate them myself…"

Ludlow also observed the ravages of opium addiction among the Chinese immigrant population in San Francisco:

I shall never forget till my dying day that awful Chinese face which actually made me rein my horse at the door of the opium hong where it appeared, after a night's debauch, at six o'clock one morning… It spoke of such a nameless horror in its owner's soul that I made the sign for a pipe and proposed, in "pigeon English," to furnish the necessary coin. The Chinaman sank down on the steps of the hong, like a man hearing medicine proposed to him when he was gangrened from head to foot, and made a gesture, palms downward, toward the ground, as one who said, "It has done its last for me — I am paying the matured bills of penalty."

From San Francisco, Bierstadt and Ludlow ventured to Yosemite, then to Mount Shasta, and then into Oregon, where Ludlow was struck "by a violent attack of pneumonia, which came near terminating my earthly with my Oregon pilgrimage" and which stopped their wandering for the better part of a week.

By late in 1864, after Ludlow's return to New York City, his marriage was in trouble. The reasons for the strife are unknown, but surviving letters suggest a mutual and scandal-provoking flood of infidelity. Rosalie obtained a divorce in May 1866. She would, a few months later, marry Albert Bierstadt.

Ludlow meanwhile was again trying to kick a drug addiction, but he quickly started up a relationship with Maria O. Milliken, of whom little is known except that she was ten years his senior and had children of her own. They were married shortly after Rosalie's marriage to Bierstadt.

== New York stories ==
There was little in the field of literature that Ludlow did not feel qualified to attempt. He wrote stories for the magazines of his day, poetry, political commentary, art-, music-, drama-, and literary-criticism, and science and medical writing. As a newspaper writer, he also translated articles from foreign newspapers.

Most of his stories were light-hearted romances, sprinkled with characters like "Mr. W. Dubbleyew," or "Major Highjinks," and generally concerning some semi-ridiculous obstacle that comes between the narrator and a beautiful young woman he's fallen in love with. Occasional stories break from this pattern:

=== The Phial of Dread ===
The Phial of Dread was one of Ludlow's earliest magazine stories, published in October 1859. It is written as the journal of a chemist who is visited in his laboratory by the insane daughter of an acquaintance, who felt herself pursued by Death. When she got to the lab, she immediately sought out some chemical with which she could kill herself:

We were alone together among the strange poisons, each one of whom, with a quicker or a slower death-devil in his eye, sat in his glass or porcelain sentry-box, a living force of bale. Should it be Hemp? No, that was too slow, uncertain, painful. Morphine? Too many antidotes — too much commonness, ostentation in that. Daturin? I did not like to ask how much of that was certain…

She finally stabs herself in the heart with a knife she finds in the lab. The author of the journal, Edgar Sands, panics, fearing that he will be blamed for the death, and attempts to destroy the body,

…he went calmly to work, with an awful despair in his eyes, and cut the shell of me — the husk I had left — to pieces; as a surgeon would, on a table in the laboratory. These fragments he screwed down into a large retort, and placed in the fiercest of flames, fed with pure oxygen… I knew that all of me that had been seen on earth was reducing there to its ultimates — I was distilled there by degrees.

Her soul becomes trapped in the vial in which he pours the last drops of this substance, and he in turn is tormented by the presence he sees as a small, tortured woman within the vial. She is, however, able to take over his body with her soul long enough to write the confession from which the above excerpts come. This saves Mr. Sands from capital punishment, but he notes that the last pages of his journal were "written… after I was discharged from Bloomingdale Insane Asylum."

=== The Music Essence ===
The Music Essence, printed in 1861 by The Commercial Advertiser, featured a man who composes a symphony for his deaf wife by translating the musical notes into light and colors. This story was certainly inspired by the synesthesia Ludlow experienced during his hashish experiences, of which he wrote that:

The soul is sometimes plainly perceived to be but one in its own sensorium, while the body is understood to be all that so variously modifies impressions as to make them in the one instance smell, in another taste, another sight, and thus on, ad finem. Thus the hasheesh-eater knows what it is to be burned by salt fire, to smell colors, to see sounds, and, much more frequently, to see feelings.

=== John Heathburn's Title ===
John Heathburn's Title (1864) concerns an opium and alcohol addict who is cured through the patience of a concerned physician, and through a substitution therapy utilizing a cannabis extract. It represents Ludlow's first published discussion of his role as a physician treating opium addicts.

=== The Household Angel ===
The Household Angel was published over a series of thirteen issues of Harper's Bazaar in 1868, and is a soap opera of betrayal, deceit, and the descent of a likable protagonist into alcoholism and despair.

=== Cinderella ===
Ludlow's sole foray into drama was an adaptation of Cinderella which he wrote for the Metropolitan Fair, New York City's Sanitary Fair of 1864. It was an enormous affair to benefit the National Sanitary Commission in their war-relief efforts. The play was performed by children, under the direction of Jessie Benton Frémont, the wife of General John C. Fremont, (and starring their son), and included two shetland ponies.

=== "E Pluribus Unum" ===
Among the more interesting of Ludlow's articles was "E Pluribus Unum", published in The Galaxy in November 1866. It reviews attempts by pre-relativistic physicists to unify the known forces into a single force. It is occasionally anachronistic, as when Ludlow reviews failed attempts to explain the enormous energy radiated from the sun using classical physics, eventually settling on the heat given off by incoming meteor collisions as the most likely explanation.

And it is occasionally visionary, as when Ludlow, decades before Albert Einstein would do the same, abandons the idea of the æther and muses that "[w]e might be allowed to… assert that because our only cognitions of matter are cognitions of force, matter in the scientific sense is force." He does not elaborate, and evidently the article was altered and cut for publication substantially, so we are left to wonder how far he pursued this idea of the equivalency of matter and energy.

=== Homes for the Friendless ===
One of the last published pieces by Ludlow was written for the New York Tribune, and published early in the year of his death. Probably prompted by his work with destitute opiate addicts, the article, "Homes for the Friendless," advocated the establishment of homeless shelters in New York City, particularly for alcoholics and other drug addicts, noting that the existing shelters served women and children only, and that there was a growing class of homeless men in need of assistance. The idea was enthusiastically endorsed in an editorial by Tribune editor Horace Greeley.

== Final years ==
The last years of Ludlow's life seem to have been a constant struggle with addiction. Family letters, when they mention him, usually either hopefully discuss his latest release from habit or mourn his latest relapse. His cousin wrote in March 1870, that "Dr. Smith has been treating him for a while but he said to a lady the other day — that there was no use in his wasting his strength [treating] Mr. Ludlow, for he took a teaspoonful of morphine in a glass of whisky every day — and while he persisted in doing that it was only time & strength thrown away…"

His writing focus, as well as the focus of his life, turned to the problem of opium addiction. He described this as "one of my life's ruling passions — a very agony of seeking to find — any means of bringing the habituated opium-eater out of his horrible bondage, without, or comparatively without, pain." His essay What Shall They Do to be Saved from Harper's was included in the 1868 book (written by Horace Day, himself a recovering addict) The Opium Habit, one of the first books to deal in a medical way with opium addiction, which had become a national crisis in the wake of the Civil War. Ludlow expanded on his original essay with Outlines of the Opium Cure, a portrait in words of an ideal, perhaps utopian, drug addiction treatment clinic.

The opium addict, according to Ludlow (in a view which even today seems progressive), "is a proper subject, not for reproof, but for medical treatment. The problem of his case need embarrass nobody. It is as purely physical as one of smallpox… [He] is suffering under a disease of the very machinery of volition; and no more to be judged harshly for his acts than a wound for suppurating or the bowels for continuing the peristaltic motion."

Ludlow's writings led addicts from all over the country to write for advice, and he spent a great deal of time in his last years answering this correspondence. He also treated addicts as a physician, and one friend said that "I have known him to go for three weeks at a time without taking off his clothing for sleep, in attendance upon the sick. His face was a familiar one in many a hospital ward… During the last weeks of his residence in New York, he supported, out of his scanty means, a family of which one of the members had been a victim to opium. This family had no claim upon him whatever excepting that of the sympathy which such misfortunes always excited in him. The medicines and money he furnished this single family in the course of the several weeks that I knew about them, could not have amounted to less than one hundred dollars, and this case was only one of many."

But Ludlow himself was unable to break the habit. The same friend writes,

Alas, with what sadness his friends came to know that while he was doing so much to warn and restore others from the effects of this fearful habit, he himself was still under its bondage. Again and again he seemed to have broken it. Only those most intimate with him knew how he suffered at such periods… I recall a night he passed with me some months after the publication of [What Shall They Do to Be Saved?]. He was in an excited state, and we took a long walk together, during which he spoke freely of his varied trials, and he finally went to my house to sleep. I went directly to bed, but he was a long time making his preparations, and I at length suspected he was indulging his old craving. For the first and only time in my life I spoke harshly to him, and characterized his abuse of himself and of the confidence of his friends as shameful. He replied depreciatingly, and turning down the gas-light came around and crept into bed beside me. We both lay a moment in silence, and feeling reproved for my harshness, I said: "Think, Fitz, of your warnings on the subject, and of your effort, in behalf of other victims." In a tone and with a pathos I can never forget, he answered — "He saved others, himself he could not save."

Ludlow left for Europe in June 1870 in an attempt to recover, both from his addictions and from tuberculosis. He travelled from New York with his sister Helen, who had been a constant source of support, and his wife, Maria, and one of her sons. They stayed for a month and a half in London, then left for Geneva, Switzerland when his health again took a downturn.

He died the morning after his thirty-fourth birthday, and, perhaps as he meant to predict in this passage in What Shall They Do to Be Saved?: "Over the opium-eater's coffin at least, thank God! a wife and a sister can stop weeping and say, 'He's free.'"

== See also ==
- Fitz Hugh Ludlow Memorial Library

== Sources ==
- Gross, David M. (1995). "A Brief Biography of Fitz Hugh Ludlow". Archived from the original on 2018-06-13.
