= Nassau Lake, New York =

- Census-designated place
- Location within New York Location within the United States
- Coordinates: 42°32′12″N 73°36′31″W
- Country: United States
- State: New York
- County: Rensselaer
- Towns: Schodack; Nassau

Area
  - Total: 1.80 sq mi (4.65 km^{2})
  - Land: 1.52 sq mi (3.94 km^{2})
  - Water: 0.27 sq mi (0.71 km^{2})
- Elevation: 420 ft (130 m)

Population (2020)
  - Total: 1,004
  - Density: 659.9/sq mi (254.77/km^{2})
- Time zone: UTC-5 (Eastern (EST))
  - Summer (DST): UTC-4 (EDT)
- ZIP Code: 12123 (Nassau)
- Area codes: 518/838
- FIPS code: 36-49555
- GNIS feature ID: 2812769

Nassau Lake is a census-designated place (CDP) in the towns of Schodack and Nassau in Rensselaer County, New York, United States. It was first listed as a CDP prior to the 2020 census. As of the 2020 census, Nassau Lake had a population of 1,004.

Nassau Lake CDP is in southern Rensselaer County, surrounding a lake of the same name. The CDP includes the hamlets of Rosecrans Park, Braeside, and Morey Park, and it is bordered to the south by the village of Nassau. The CDP is 13 miles (21 km) southeast of Albany, the state capital. The outlet of Nassau Lake, the Valatie Kill, flows south to Kinderhook Creek, which continues southwest to Stockport Creek and the Hudson River.

The Nassau Lake is currently polluted with PCBs, industrial hazardous waste and carcinogens from the Dewey Loeffel Landfill. In 2019, the Community Advisory Group was founded on the basis of communication about future plans regarding this lake and the pollution.

== Demographics ==
Historical population
Census	Pop.	Note	%±
2020	1,004		—
U.S. Decennial Census
