= Spring Street Presbyterian Church =

Presbyterian church in Manhattan, New York

- New Spring Street Presbyterian Church
- 40.7255°N 74.0054°W
- Location: SoHo, Manhattan, New York, US
- Denomination: Presbyterian

History
- Founded: 1811

Architecture
- Functional status: Closed
- Construction cost: Over $10,000
- Closed: December 14, 1963

Spring Street Presbyterian Church was a Presbyterian church on Spring and Varick Streets, in SoHo, Manhattan, New York City, United States.

Noted for its abolitionist stance, it was mostly forgotten until 2006 when bodies buried in its cemetery were rediscovered during the construction of The Dominick.

== History ==
=== Founding and leadership under Samuel Hanson Cox ===
In the early 19th century, there was no Presbyterian church in what is today SoHo. Worshippers either attended the First Presbyterian Church in Greenwich Village, or led prayer in their homes and businesses. One of these, a grocery store or home, owned by Trinity Church, was at the future site of the Spring Street Church.

In 1807, the site of Spring Street Church was bought by a group of men, which included politicians Henry Rutgers and Samuel Osgood. Its cornerstone was placed on July 5, 1810. Built with materials from the First Presbyterian Church following its cessation, its construction cost more than $10,000, which indebted the church by the time it opened. The church had 176 pews, fifty of which sat in a raised viewing area. It was made an official Presbyterian church in 1811 and was renovated in 1818.

The Spring Street Church's first pastor was Matthew La Rue Perrine, who led the church from October 31, 1811, to 1820. He was succeeded by Samuel Hanson Cox, an abolitionist. Under his leadership, the church desegregated. In 1825, Cox and his followers left the church to move further into Lower Manhattan. All but 43 members of the church remained at the original location, and the Presbytery of New York derecognized it as a church.

=== Leadership under Henry G. Ludlow and later years ===
The old church renamed itself to the New Spring Street Presbyterian Church. It was bought by George P. Shipman of the Brick Presbyterian Church, who transferred the property to Abijah Fisher. After a series of temporary pastors, Henry G. Ludlow was made pastor on December 25, 1828. Despite being an abolitionist, the church was segregated under his leadership. During the New York anti-abolitionist riots of 1834, the Spring Street Church was attacked by a mob, due to rumors the church officiated interracial marriages. Rioters destroyed the interior and used the pews and organ to build a barrier between themselves and the National Guard. They also rang the church bell to taunt the National Guard and draw more rioters.

Following the riots, $10,000 was raised to fund the rebuilding of Spring Street Church. Completed in June 1836, the rebuilt church was larger and sat on property bought by the church prior to the riot. After this, Ludlow and the congregation showed disapproval of interracial marriage, though otherwise supported civil rights. In 1837, Ludlow left the church, and the Grimké sisters began speaking there. Following the closure of the Laight Street Baptist Church, the attendance of Spring Street Church significantly grew.

The church struggled financially in the 1850s, with its sale being considered in 1857; the Duane Street Methodist Episcopal Church and the Thirteenth Street Presbyterian Church both placed bids, with the latter placing $11,000. Spring Street Church attempted to retract their offer, but Thirteenth Street made them pay $5,000 to do so. Financial struggles continued into the 1860s, paying off its debts in 1867. The same year, the church hired pastor, A. W. Halsey. By 1877, debt returned. The church declined and was dissolved on December 14, 1963. The property was sold to The Salvation Army in 1966, who planned to demolish it. The plans ceased after a fire burnt the church down.

== Burial vaults ==
The Spring Street Church operated burial vaults, located east of the church. Burials were dated between 1820 and 1850, with one costing $10 for adults and $2–$8 for children. On May 18, 1831, two additional vaults were built. Changing laws in Manhattan regarding human burials forced the church to close the vaults to new burials around 1840.

After the property was sold to the Salvation Army in 1966, a parking lot was built atop the burial vaults. In December 2006, the remains of around 190 people were rediscovered during construction of The Dominick. The bodies were moved to Green-Wood Cemetery in Brooklyn. Archeological excavation occurred in December 2007. When studied, the children were discovered to have contracted scurvy and rickets during their lifetimes.
