= The Hasheesh Eater =

1857 autobiographical book by Fitz Hugh Ludlow

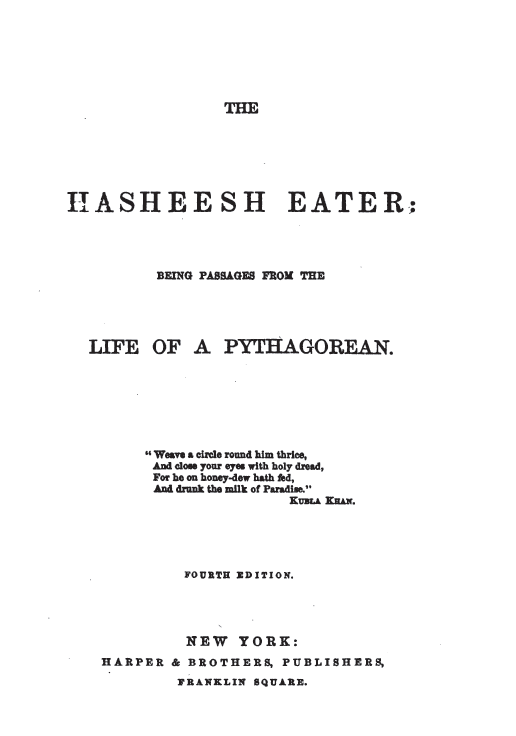
- Author: Fitz Hugh Ludlow
- Language: English
- Subject: Cannabis
- Published: 1857

The Hasheesh Eater (1857) is an autobiographical book by Fitz Hugh Ludlow describing the author's altered states of consciousness and philosophical flights of fancy while he was using large doses of cannabis tincture. Within the United States, the book created a short-lived popular interest in hashish, cannabis edibles, and cannabis tincture. The book was later popular in the hippie movement of the 1960s.

The Hasheesh Eater is often compared to Confessions of an English Opium-Eater (1821), Thomas De Quincey's account of his own addiction to laudanum (opium and alcohol).

== Publication history ==
First published in 1857, The Hasheesh Eater went through four editions in the late 1850s and early 1860s, each put out by Harper & Brothers. In 1903, another publishing house put a reprint of the original edition — and the last complete edition until 1970. As of 2006, two editions are in print, including an annotated version first published in 2003.

== Summary ==
Ludlow said, "The entire truth of Nature cannot be copied," so "the artist must select between the major and minor facts of the outer world; that, before he executes, he must pronounce whether he will embody the essential effect, that which steals on the soul and possesses it without painful analysis, or the separate details which belong to the geometrician and destroy the effect." Many of his passages, which may have seemed like fantastic myth-making to his contemporaries, ring true today with more modern knowledge of the psychedelic state. Ludlow writes of one hallucination: "And now, with time, space expanded also… The whole atmosphere seemed ductile, and spun endlessly out into great spaces surrounding me on every side."

Ludlow curiously describes the marijuana smoker as one who is reaching for "the soul’s capacity for a broader being, deeper insight, grander views of Beauty, Truth and Good than she now gains through the chinks of her cell." Conversely, he says of hashish users: "Ho there! pass by; I have tried this way; it leads at last into poisonous wildernesses."

== Cultural effect ==
The popularity of The Hasheesh Eater led to interest in the drug it described. Not long after publication, the Gunjah Wallah Co. in New York began advertising "Hasheesh Candy":

The Arabian "Gunjh" of Enchantment confectionized. — A most pleasurable and harmless stimulant. — Cures Nervousness, Weakness, Melancholy, &c. Inspires all classes with new life and energy. A complete mental and physical invigorator.

John Hay, who would become a close confidant of President Lincoln and later U.S. Secretary of State, remembered Brown University as the place “where I used to eat Hasheesh and dream dreams.” And a classmate recalls that after reading Ludlow’s book, Hay “must needs experiment with hasheesh a little, and see if it was such a marvelous stimulant to the imagination as Fitzhugh Ludlow affirmed. ‘The night when Johnny Hay took hasheesh’ marked an epoch for the dwellers in Hope College.”

Within twenty-five years of the publication of The Hasheesh Eater, many cities in the United States had private hashish parlors. As there was already a controversy about the perceived morality of cannabis intoxication, when tourists could buy intoxicating cannabis products at the 1876 Philadelphia Centennial Exposition, the Illustrated Police News would write about “The Secret Dissipation of New York Belles… a Hasheesh Hell on Fifth Avenue.”

Howard Phillips Lovecraft owned a copy of The Hasheesh Eater, bought in 1925 from fellow writer and bookseller Samuel Loveman. In a 1927 letter to Bernard Austin Dwyer, Lovecraft declared the influence of Ludlow's writings on his own:

Have I read Fitzhugh Ludlow's Hasheesh Eater? Why, Sir, I possess it upon mine own shelves; and wou'd not part with it for any inducement whatever! I have frequently reread those phantasmagoria of exotic colour, which proved more of a stimulant to my own fancy than any vegetable alkaloid ever grown and distilled. [...] The reeling panoramas out of space and time have an unmistakable tinge of authenticity, and even the metaphysical speculations were far from arid."

== Rediscovery ==
Ludlow’s writings crop up in a couple of places in pre-marijuana-prohibition 20th century America. The occultist Aleister Crowley found The Hasheesh Eater to be “tainted by admiration of de Quincey and the sentimentalists” but admired Ludlow’s “wonderful introspection” and printed significant excerpts from the book in his journal The Equinox. Using the pseudonym Oliver Haddo, Crowley also wrote at length about his own cannabis experiences, comparing and contrasting them to those of Ludlow. He “was struck by the circumstance that [Ludlow], obviously ignorant of Vedantist and Yogic doctrines, yet approximately expressed them, though in a degraded and distorted form.”

After the prohibition of marijuana, the writings of Ludlow were interpreted by two camps. On the one hand, there were the prohibitionists, who pointed out Ludlow’s addiction to the extract and his horrifying hallucinations; on the other, those who believed that cannabis deserved a second chance and saw Ludlow as a literate chronicler of the mystical heights that could be reached using the drug.

In 1938, shortly after the federal government cracked down on marijuana, the cautionary portions of the book were carried on in the book Marihuana: America’s New Drug Problem. The book included several pages of excerpts from The Hasheesh Eater and noted that

It was Ludlow… who contributed the most remarkable description of the hashish effects. He not only described the acute hashish episode with great intensity and fidelity but recorded the development of an addiction and the subsequent struggle which resulted in his breaking the habit. As an autobiography of a drug addict it is, in several respects, superior to De Quincey's “Confessions”

In 1953, Union College selected the alumnus Fitz Hugh Ludlow as a “Union Worthy” and invited three academics to compose speeches for the occasion. Morris Bishop (who would later include his impressions in his book Eccentrics), criticized Ludlow’s later attempts at fiction, writing that his short stories “are today stale and meaningless… echoes of all the other magazine stories of his time, originating in literature, not in life, and conducted with no regard for truth and with little for verisimilitude.” In The Hasheesh Eater on the other hand:

is a sincerity, a reality, which he could not recapture when he tried to construct stories solely from his imagination… He finds lyric phrasing to convey the unearthly beauty of his visions, and the unearthly horror of the evil fantasia which succeeded his bliss. He is a drugged Dante in reverse, descending from the Paradiso to the Inferno. His descriptions, drawing from his subconscious a strange mingling of the sublime and the grotesque, often suggest the work of Dali and other surrealists. The writer’s passion gives his work an intensity which the reader recognizes and sympathetically feels. This is a very considerable literary achievement.

Robert DeRopp, in the 1957 book Drugs and the Mind, was perhaps the first to express skepticism at Ludlow’s “addiction” story, noting that “[n]o one seriously interested in the effects of drugs on the mind should fail to read Ludlow’s book,” but accusing Ludlow of a “hypertrophy of the imagination and an excessive dependence on the works of De Quincey” (although he also found The Hasheesh Eater to be “more lively and more colorful reading than… the grossly overrated confessions of that ‘English opium-eater.’”). DeRopp suspected that “in many places scientific impartiality has been sacrificed in the interests of literary effect.”

At this point in time, there occurred a resurgence of interest in marijuana in the United States and the emergence of psychedelics in the English-speaking world as a whole. Researchers, like pioneering mescaline researcher Heinrich Klüver, looked to Ludlow’s seminal writings on the psychedelic experience for insight on the new drugs that were being discovered and synthesized.

In 1960, The Hasty Papers: A One-Shot Review, a Beat literature journal, devoted most of its pages to reprinting the first edition of The Hasheesh Eater in its entirety, and David Ebin’s book The Drug Experience included three chapters from The Hasheesh Eater. In 1966, excerpts were published in The Marijuana Papers edited by David Solomon. In 1970, a reprint of the 1857 edition was put out by Gregg Press, and the Berkeley Barb reprinted several chapters.

By this time Ludlow had been rediscovered, both by mainstream researchers into drugs and addiction, and by the growing drug-savvy counterculture. Oriana J. Kalant, in 1971 in The International Journal of the Addictions found The Hasheesh Eater to be a remarkable description of the effects of cannabis:

…it is evident that Ludlow recognized, with remarkable insight, most of the characteristic subjective effects of cannabis. He also noted, and interpreted essentially correctly, such pharmacological points as the relation of dose to effect, inter- and intra-individual variations in response, and the influence of set and setting. Most importantly, perhaps, he recorded the development of his dependence on cannabis more comprehensively and astutely than anyone to date. The initial motives — including features of his own personality and temperament — the constant rationalization, compulsive use despite obvious untoward effects, the progression to a state of almost continuous intoxication, the inability to reduce his dose gradually, and the intense craving and depression after abrupt withdrawal, all are clearly described. Ludlow recognized also the lack of physical symptoms during withdrawal, and the difference from opium withdrawal in this respect.

With the benefit of hindsight, we can also identify in Ludlow’s account a number of other features consistent with present knowledge, but which even scientists of his day could not possibly have known. For example, the initial change in tolerance, the continuum between euphoria and hallucinations, the differentiation between the hallucinatory process and the affective reactions to it, the relation between spontaneous and drug-induced perceptual changes, the similarity between the effects of cannabis and those of other hallucinogens, the attempts at drug substitution therapy (opium, tobacco), and the role of psychotherapy and abreactive writing, are all in keeping with contemporary thought. These points permit the modern reader to feel even greater confidence in the extraordinary accuracy and perceptiveness of Ludlow’s record.

The mid 1970s saw two new editions of The Hasheesh Eater in print, one by San Francisco’s City Lights Books, and a well-annotated and illustrated version edited by Michael Horowitz and released by Level Press. By the late 1970s, you could even find the face of Fitz Hugh Ludlow on a T-shirt, thanks to his alma mater Union College, which had thrown a “Fitzhugh Ludlow Day” celebration in 1979.

In the 1990's and 2000s, Ludlow has been introduced to a new generation through Terence McKenna, who read chapters from The Hasheesh Eater for a set of tapes known as “Victorian Tales of Cannabis”, and who regularly praised Ludlow in his books and lectures, saying Ludlow “began a tradition of pharmo-picaresque literature that would find later practitioners in William Burroughs and Hunter S. Thompson.… Part genius, part madman, Ludlow lies halfway between Captain Ahab and P.T. Barnum, a kind of Mark Twain on hashish. There is a wonderful charm to his free-spirited, pseudoscientific openness as he makes his way into the shifting dunescapes of the world of hashish.”

The Hasheesh Eater remains Ludlow's most remembered work. Only one other of his books, The Heart of the Continent, has been republished since the 19th century.

== See also ==
- Les paradis artificiels by Charles Baudelaire
- List of books about cannabis
