= Schodack Landing Historic District =

Historic district in New York, United States

- U.S. National Register of Historic Places
- U.S. Historic district
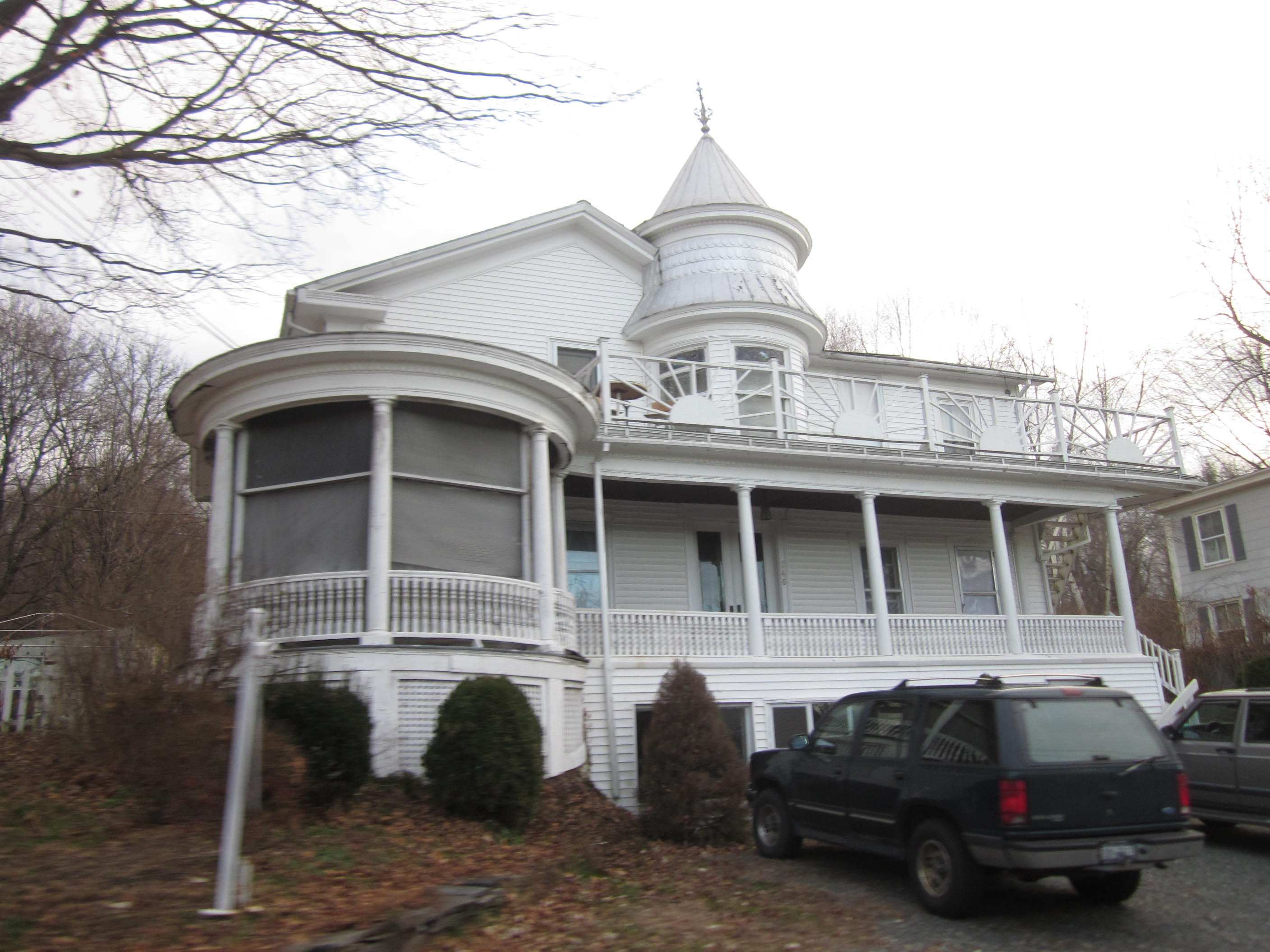
- William Gardineer House, Schodack Landing Historic District, December 2011

- Location within New York Location within the United States
- Location: NY 9J, Schodack Landing, New York
- Coordinates: 42°28′58″N 73°46′7″W
- Area: 205 acres (83 ha)
- Architect: Multiple
- Architectural style: Greek Revival, Italianate
- NRHP reference No.: 77000976
- Added to NRHP: September 15, 1977

Schodack Landing Historic District is a national historic district located at Schodack Landing in Rensselaer County, New York. It consists of 86 contributing buildings located in the hamlet of Schodack Landing. The district includes a variety of buildings dated from the 18th through early 20th centuries. They are mostly residential buildings, but include a post office, two churches, a nursing home, a tavern, and a store. There are notable buildings in the Greek Revival and Italianate styles.

It was listed on the National Register of Historic Places in 1977.
