= Muitzes Kill Historic District =

Historic district in New York, United States

- U.S. National Register of Historic Places
- U.S. Historic district
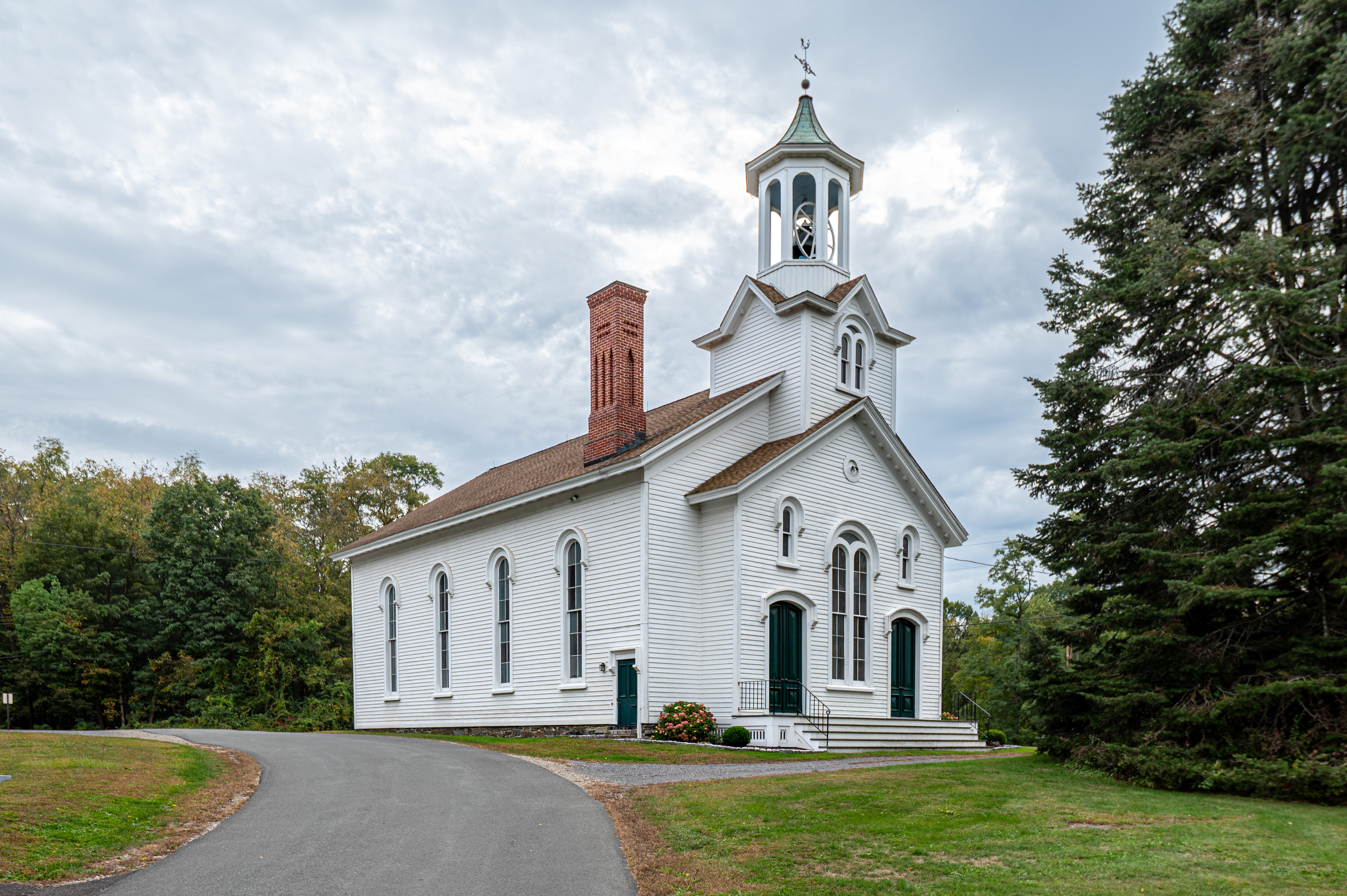
- Reformed Church in 2025

- Location within New York Location within the United States
- Location: An irregular pattern on both sides of Schodack Landing Rd., Schodack, New York
- Coordinates: 42°28′35″N 73°43′22″W
- Area: 27 acres (11 ha)
- Architectural style: Greek Revival, Federal, Dutch
- NRHP reference No.: 74001297
- Added to NRHP: July 24, 1974

Muitzes Kill Historic District is a national historic district located at Schodack in Rensselaer County, New York. It consists of 23 contributing buildings located in the hamlet of Muitzes Kill, or Muitzeskill (kill is derived from archaic Dutch for "creek"). The district is one of two in the town of Schodack, the other being Schodack Landing Historic District just two miles west where Muitzeskill Road meets the Hudson River.

The visual focus of the district is the Reformed Church of Schodack (1876). Also in the district are a variety of residential buildings dated to the 18th and 19th centuries in the Greek Revival, Federal, and Dutch styles. The district formed partly in response to the development of mills running on hydropower generated by the Muitzes Kill and the remnants of at least one of these mills is still visible along that stream. Although the district is still notable for the preservation of 18th- and 19th-century structures, several late-20th-century residences have been added (such as modular homes). In addition, by 2007 a proposal had been made to develop a tract of land at the southwest corner of Schodack Landing and Muitzeskill Roads to accommodate 30 to 40 new residences. This development would be immediately adjacent to three structures in the district, including the mid-18th century Kittle House and the Reformed Church. However, no construction has occurred to date.

It was listed on the National Register of Historic Places in 1974.
