= Elmbrook Farm =

- U.S. National Register of Historic Places
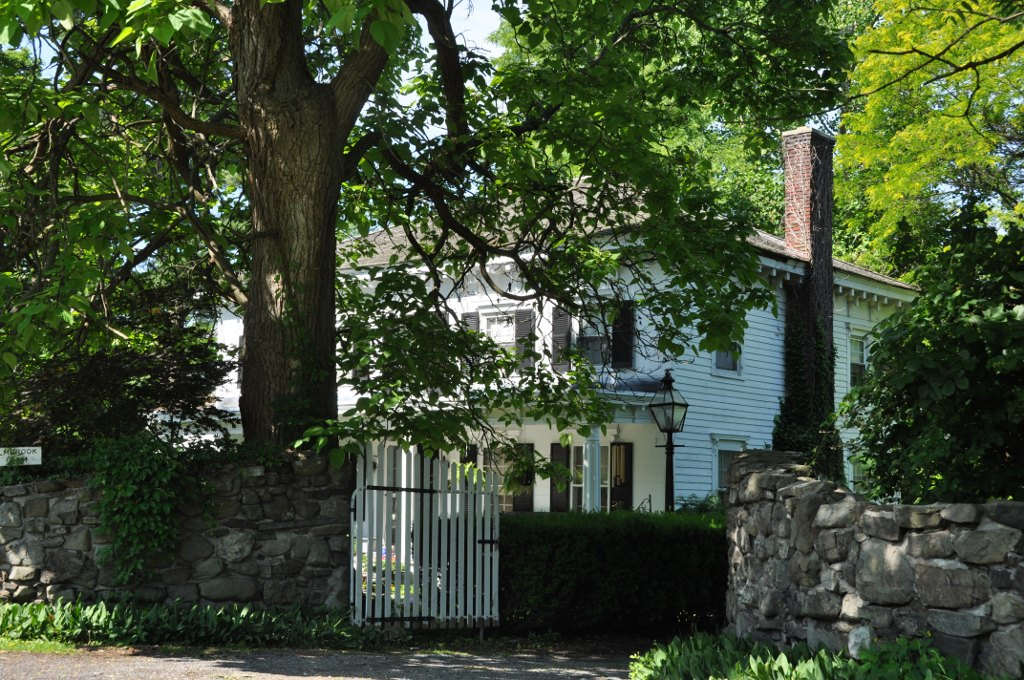

- Location within New York Location within the United States
- Location: 2567 Brookview Rd., Schodack, New York
- Coordinates: 42°34′22″N 73°42′39″W
- Area: 51.5 acres (20.8 ha)
- Built: 1830
- Architectural style: Federal, Greek Revival, Et al.
- NRHP reference No.: 01000551
- Added to NRHP: May 21, 2001

Elmbrook Farm is a historic farm complex located at Schodack in Rensselaer County, New York. The farmhouse itself was built about 1830 and modified about twenty years later to include Greek Revival architecture. The complex also includes a barn (ca. 1790), a shop / office (ca. 1800), a milk shed, a corn crib, a cinder block garage, and a small family burial plot.

It was listed on the National Register of Historic Places in 2001.
