= Joachim Staats House and Gerrit Staats Ruin =

Historic house in New York, United States

- U.S. National Register of Historic Places
- U.S. Historic district
- Location within New York Location within the United States
- Nearest city: Schodack, New York
- Coordinates: 42°34′15″N 73°44′58″W
- Area: 39 acres (16 ha)
- Architectural style: Greek Revival, Federal, Dutch Tradition
- NRHP reference No.: 78001898
- Added to NRHP: December 15, 1978

The Joachim Staats House and Gerrit Staats Ruin is a national historic district in the Town of Schodack in Rensselaer County, New York.

== History ==
The Joachim Staats House and Gerrit Staats Ruin is located on Papscanee Island, a former island that later became a peninsula. It consists of one contributing building and two contributing sites. The Joachim Staats House is a private residence consisting of a two-story, rectangular stone building built in 1696, with a brick addition built about 1790 and a wood addition completed about 1880. The surrounding land includes the site of a former sloop landing, a small family cemetery, and the site of the Gerrit Staats house. The Gerrit Staats house was built in 1758 and destroyed by fire in 1973. There are no visible ruins on the property. As of 2012, the Joachim Staats House was owned by a corporation controlled by the Staats family; it had been continuously owned by the Staats family since it was built, and nine generations of the family had resided there.

The site was listed on the National Register of Historic Places in 1978.
