= Song to Old Union =

"Song to Old Union" is the alma mater of Union College in Schenectady, New York. It was written by Fitz Hugh Ludlow for Union's 1856 commencement ceremonies. It is sung each year at graduation, although it is the rare student or alumnus who knows more than the first verse and chorus.

The "brook that bounds," praised in the first verse, is Hans Groot's Kill, a scenic stream that cuts through the secluded Jackson's Garden at the north side of the campus.

== Lyrics ==
Ode to Old Union

(AIR -- "Sparkling and Bright.")

Let the Grecian dream of his sacred stream,
And sing of the brave adorning,
That Phoebus weaves from his laurel leaves
At the golden gates of Morning;
But the brook that bounds through Union's grounds
Gleams bright as the Delphic water,
And a prize as fair as a god may wear,
Is a dip from our Alma Mater!

CHORUS:
Then here's to thee, the brave and free,
Old Union smiling o'er us;
And for many a day, as thy walls grow gray,
May they ring with thy children's chorus.

Could our praises throng on the waves of song,
Like an Orient fleet gem-bringing,
We would bear to thee the argosy,
And crown thee with pearls of singing;
But thy smile beams down beneath a crown
Whose glory asks no other;
We gather it not from the green sea-grot --
'Tis the love we bear our mother!

CHORUS

Let the joy that falls from thy dear old walls,
Unchanged, brave Time's on-darting,
And our only tear falls once a year
On hands that clasp ere parting;
And when other throngs shall sing thy songs,
And their spell once hath bound us,
Our faded hours shall revive their flowers,
And the Past shall live around us.

(Source: Union College commencement pamphlet, July 23, 1856)
