= Blink Bonnie (Schodack, New York) =

Historic house in New York, United States

- U.S. National Register of Historic Places
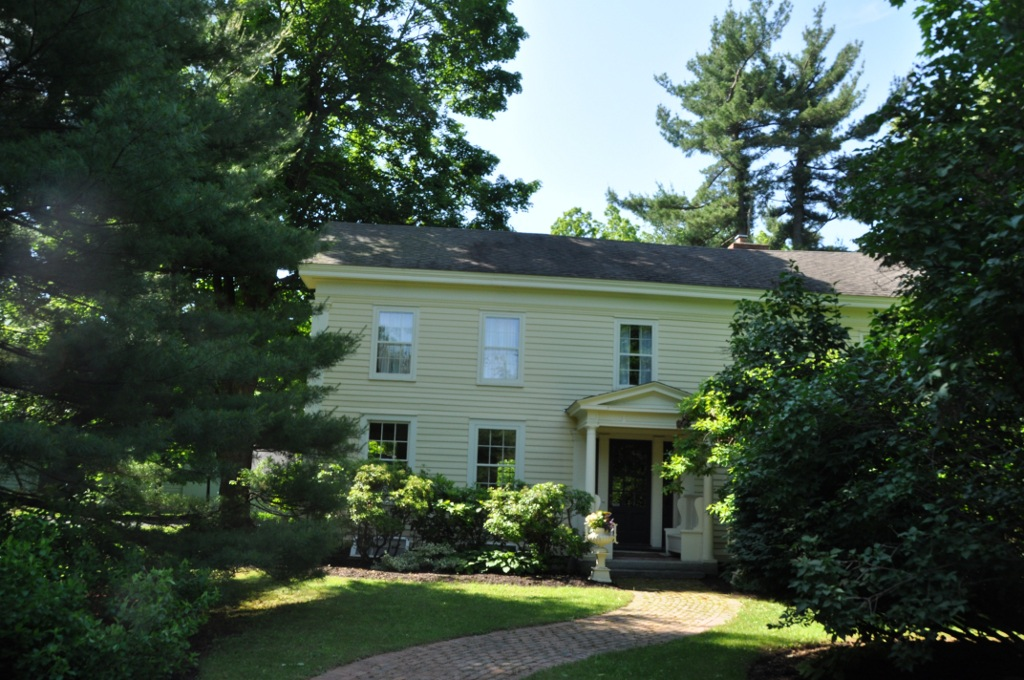

- Location within New York Location within the United States
- Interactive map showing the location of Blink Bonnie
- Location: 1368 Sunset Rd., Schodack, New York
- Coordinates: 42°34′6″N 73°42′9″W
- Area: 5 acres (2.0 ha)
- Built: ca. 1850
- Architect: Fuller & Robinson
- Architectural style: Greek Revival
- NRHP reference No.: 00000958
- Added to NRHP: August 10, 2000

Blink Bonnie is a historic home located at Schodack in Rensselaer County, New York. It was built about 1850 and remodeled and enlarged about 1915. It is a two-story, frame building with a low pitched gable roof in the Greek Revival style. There is a large two-story rear wing. It features a one-story, Colonial Revival style entrance porch added about 1915. Also on the property is a large English barn dated to about 1900, a garage, and an ice house / chicken coop.

It was listed on the National Register of Historic Places in 2000.
