= Tilden's Extract =

19th-century medicinal cannabis extract

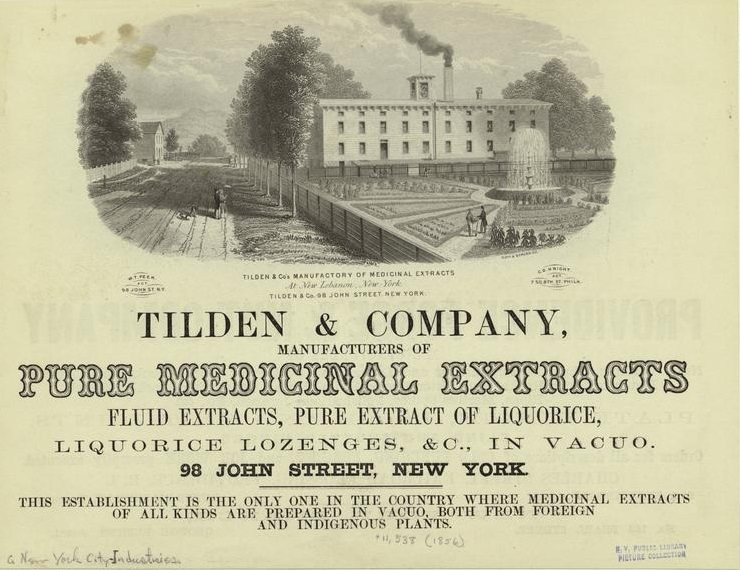
1856 advertisement for the Tilden Company, maker of Tilden's Extract.

Tilden's Extract was a 19th-century medicinal cannabis extract, first formulated by James Edward Smith of Edinburgh.

In the United States, the Tilden Company of New Lebanon, New York, manufactured and sold the extract under its own name, advertising the drug as:

Phrenic, anæsthetic, anti-spasmodic and hypnotic. Unlike opium, it does not constipate the bowels, lessen the appetite, create nausea, produce dryness of the tongue, check pulmonary secretions or produce headache. Used with success in hysteria, chorea, gout, neuralgia, acute and sub-acute rheumatism, tetanus, hydrophobia and the like.

The Tilden Company was the business of the Tilden family, which included New York Governor and 1876 Democratic nominee for President Samuel J. Tilden.

The American author Fitz Hugh Ludlow used Tilden's Extract quite often, and wrote the book The Hasheesh Eater (1857) about his experiences with the medication:

O.J. Kalant estimated the strength of Ludlow's doses as follows:

Ludlow consistently talked of "hasheesh" but in fact he took the solid extract of Cannabis Indica which was roughly twice as potent as the crude resin and ten times as potent as marijuana. A rough calculation shows that his intake was equivalent to about 6 or 7 marijuana cigarettes per dose, i.e. at the hallucinatory rather than at the euphoriant level prevalent in contemporary North American use.

Ludlow wrote of taking as much as a drachm of the extract (3.9 grams or 0.14 ounces) in his largest doses — if Kalant's figures are correct, this would equate to well over an ounce of smoked cannabis flower.
