= Fitz Hugh Ludlow Memorial Library =

- Established: 1970

Other information
- Website: Edit this at Wikidata

The Fitz Hugh Ludlow Memorial Library is a library of psychoactive drug-related literature created in 1970 by Michael D. Horowitz, Cynthia Palmer, William Dailey, and Robert Barker, who merged their private libraries. It was named for Fitz Hugh Ludlow, author of the first full-length work of drug literature written by an American, The Hasheesh Eater (1857). It was the largest such library in the world and was based in San Francisco, California. The Ludlow Library became part of the Ludlow Santo Domingo Library in Geneva, Switzerland, in 2003. After the death of its owner, Julio Mario Santo Domingo, Jr., his family loaned the book collection to the Houghton Library at Harvard University and the music collection to the Rock and Roll Hall of Fame and Museum in Cleveland, Ohio.

During the 1970s the library grew rapidly and operated out of San Francisco as an international resource for psychoactive drug research, and for the study of psychoactive drug use in contemporary and historical societies. The Ludlow Library flourished during a period of perhaps the most intense media interest ever focused on the personal, social, scientific and political aspects of drug experience. The Library helped hundreds of writers, filmmakers, and news media researchers collect accurate historical information on cannabis, the opiates, coca and cocaine, and psychedelics for their publications.

The library was curated by Michael R. Aldrich, holder of the first Ph.D. ever granted from an American university in the mythology and folklore of cannabis (SUNY-Buffalo, 1970), and he and his wife Michelle Aldrich joined the co-founders as members of the Board of Directors in 1974. The Library's advisory Board of Trustees included a number of eminent researchers and writers, including Chauncey Leake, Richard Evans Schultes, Albert Hofmann, Alexander Shulgin, Andrew Weil, Oscar Janiger, Ralph Metzner, Laura Huxley, Allen Ginsberg, Weston LaBarre, R. Gordon Wasson, Tod H. Mikuriya, and Lawrence Ferlinghetti.
