= Schodack Island State Park =

State park in the U.S. state of New York

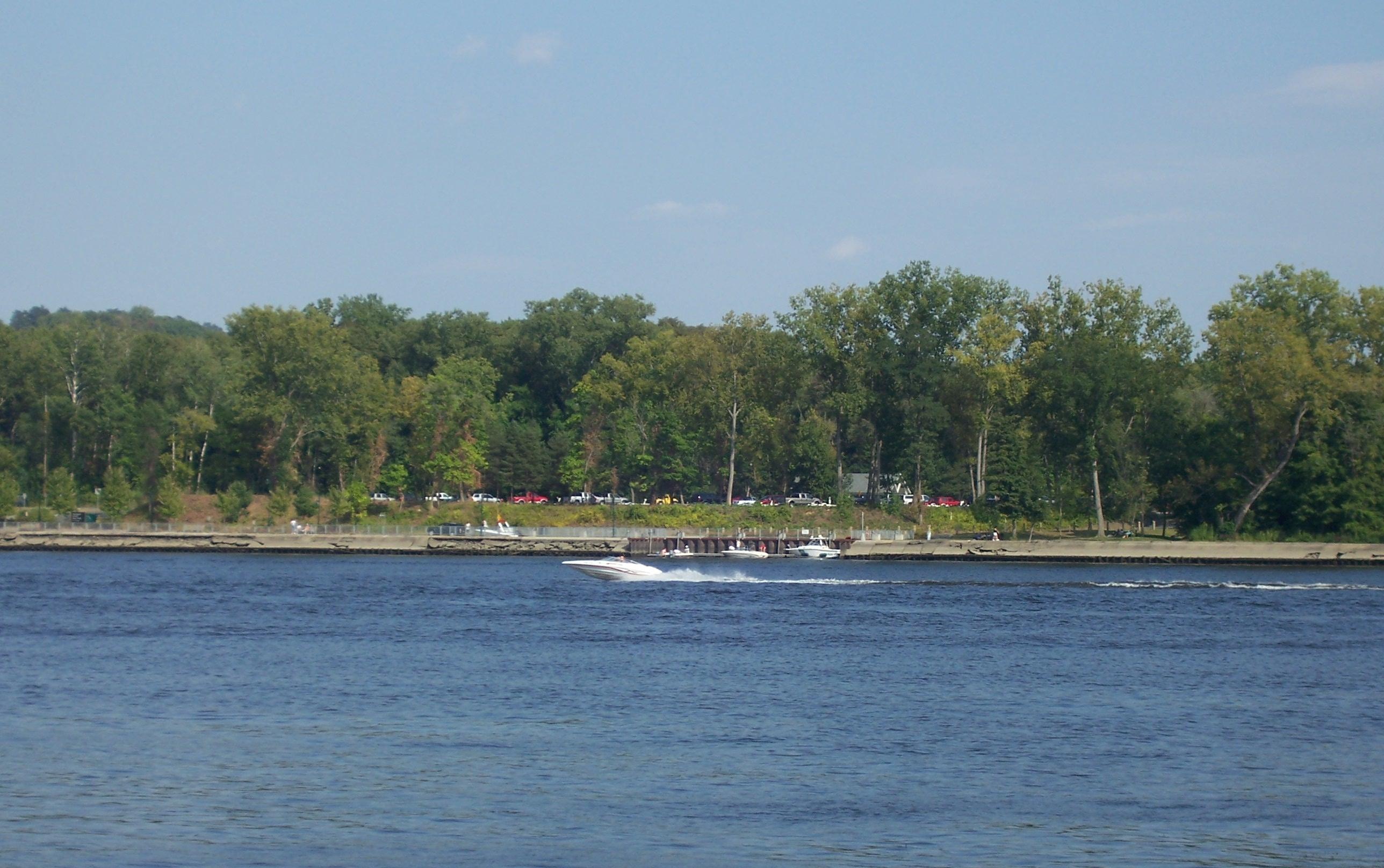
- Schodack Island State Park's boat launch area as viewed from the western shore of the Hudson River

- Location within New York
- Type: State park
- Location: 1 Schodack Island Way; Schodack Landing, New York
- Coordinates: 42°29′N 73°47′W
- Area: 1,052 acres (4.26 km^{2})
- Created: 2002
- Operator: New York State Office of Parks, Recreation and Historic Preservation
- Visitors: 125,466 (in 2014)
- Open: All year
- Camp sites: 66
- Website: Schodack Island State Park

Schodack Island State Park (formerly known as Castleton Island State Park) is a 1,052-acre (4.26 km^{2}) state park that spans portions of Rensselaer, Greene, and Columbia counties, New York. The park is located between the Hudson River and Schodack Creek, and was opened in 2002.

== History ==
The name "Schodack" is from the Mahican terms ishoda ("fire plain") and akee ("land"); the name refers to the area being the former home of the Mohicans' central council fire. During the time of the Mahicans, the area now occupied by the park was a group of six islands; it became a continuous peninsula in the early 1900s when a federal project to construct a deep-water navigation channel to Albany necessitated the construction of dikes and the deposition of dredged material along and between the islands.

What was to become Schodack Island State Park was first acquired by the New York State Office of Parks, Recreation and Historic Preservation in the 1970s, and was originally known as Castleton Island State Park. It remained undeveloped until the early 2000s.

Schodack Island State Park was opened in 2002, and was initially a day-use only park. In 2013, plans were proposed to add camping facilities to the park, representing the first new campground constructed by the New York State Office of Parks, Recreation and Historic Preservation in approximately 35 years. The campsites were made available to the public in 2016.

== Park facilities ==
Schodack Island State Park offers a campground with 66 campsites, picnic tables, eight miles (13 km) of trails, biking, birding, fishing, and hunting. Cross-country skiing and snowshoeing trails are maintained during the winter.

== Birds and Habitats ==
Schodack Island State Park is one of the best birding hotspots in the Capital/Saratoga Region of New York and a named Important Bird Area (often abbreviated as IBA) by the National Audubon Society and is known for its Eastern Bluebirds, Cerulean Warblers, Great Blue Herons and Bald Eagles. It maintains one of the highest counts of Bald Eagles in the state. Birding records show that it supported about 17 Cerulean Warblers in 1997 and the species has been spotted there since 1965. Other records show that Bald Eagles and Ospreys regularly use the canopy and general area, especially by the Hudson River and Boat Launching Area. The park offers many applicable bird habitats, including multiple trails such as the Soaring Eagle 5K trail and the Orange Trail. It offers multiple views of the Hudson River, often by a trail, harboring Bald Eagles, Ospreys and Great Blue Herons. The following chart shows bird species corresponding to each habitat.

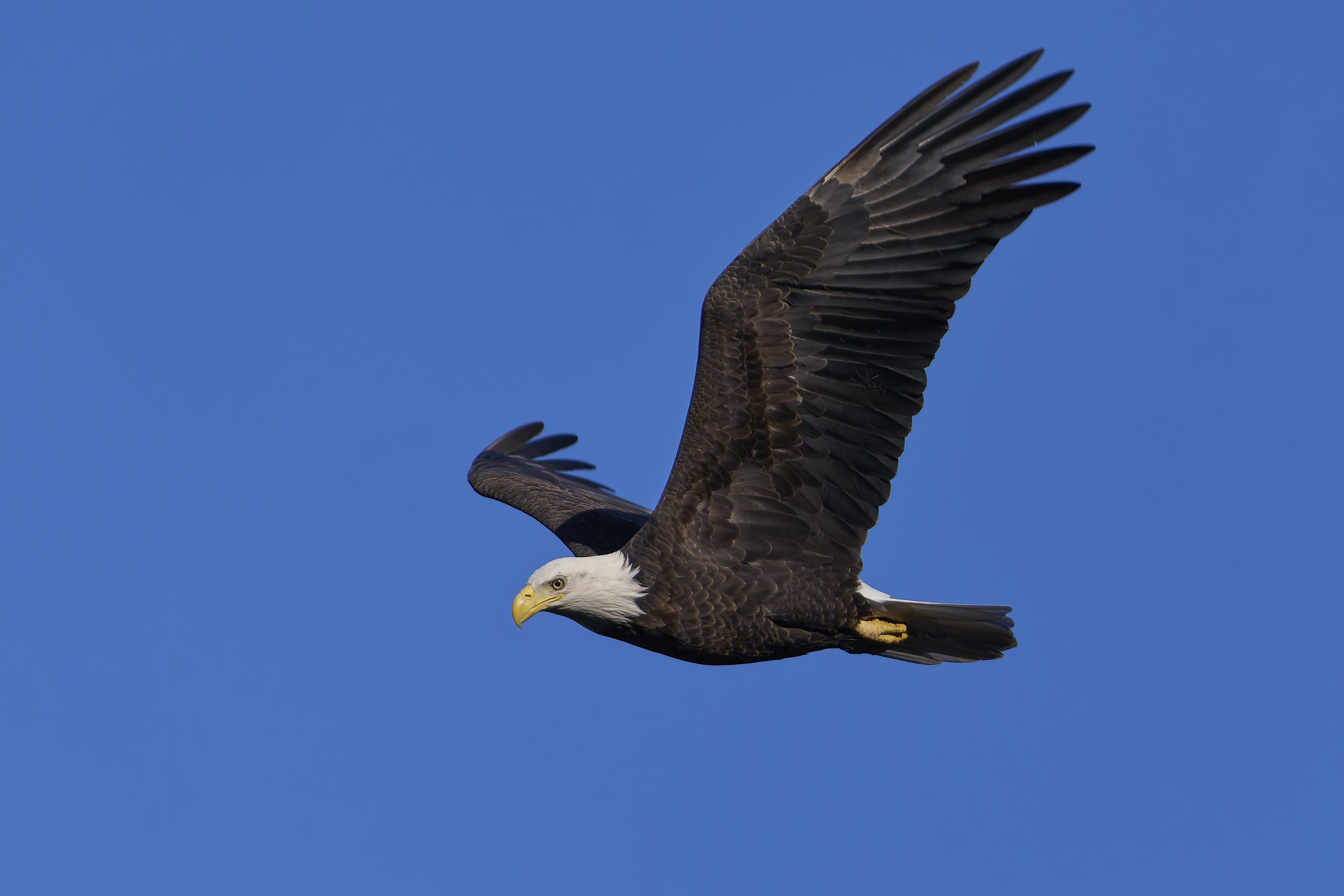
A Bald Eagle, one of the most commonly seen species at the Schodack Island State Park IBA.

Bird Species Corresponding to Habitats
Habitat	Birds	Why	Rarity
Walking Trails and Upland Forests	-Eastern Bluebird -Cerulean Warbler -American Robin -American Goldfinch -Various Warblers	Offers diverse terrain, canopy and sheltering and food/prey.	Ranges from common to somewhat rare.
Hudson River	-Bald Eagle -Osprey -Great Blue Heron	Offers fish, water for various uses and other resources.	Common
Marshes	-Red Winged Blackbird -Various Wrens -Sparrows	Offers various recources and unique habitats.	Common

== See also ==
- List of New York state parks
