= Samuel Ludlow (judge) =

American judge (1792–1882)

Samuel B. Ludlow (born 1791, New York State; died April 12, 1882, Oswego, New York) was an American jurist. He was one of the first lawyers in Nassau, New York, and was a corporation officer when Nassau was chartered, and was town clerk in 1835. He also played a role in the founding of the Nassau Academy.

From 1840 to 1845 he was a judge on the Oswego County Court of Common Pleas, and in 1841, he was named a First Judge on that court. He is listed as a retired lawyer in Oswego in the 1880 U.S. Census.

== See also ==
- Henry G. Ludlow was Samuel's brother.
- William Curtis Noyes got his legal training as a teenager in Samuel's Albany office.
