= William Curtis Noyes =

American politician (1805–1864)

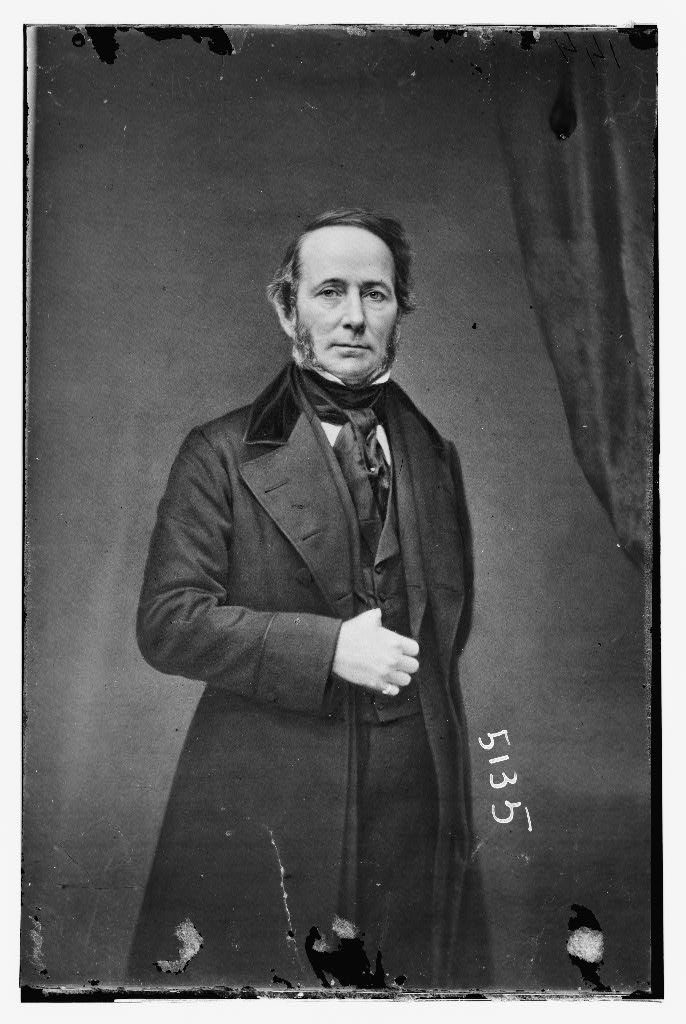
- Born: August 19, 1805; Schodack, New York, US
- Died: December 25, 1864 (aged 59)
- Occupation: Lawyer

William Curtis Noyes (August 19, 1805 – December 25, 1864) was an American lawyer from New York.

== Early life and education ==
Noyes was born in Schodack, Rensselaer County, New York on August 19, 1805 to George and Martha Noyes (née Curtis). At age 14, he began the study of law in the office of Samuel B. Ludlow of Albany. He continued his studies at the office of Henry Storrs, and was admitted to the bar in 1827.

== Career ==
He was appointed district attorney of Oneida County and soon rose to the front rank of the profession there. Later, he relocated to New York City. Though never a politician he took a deep interest in public affairs and was a man of extensive learning. His conversational powers were of the highest order. He cultivated an interest in beauty, art, and literature, and he possessed one of the finest law libraries in the U.S., which, upon his death, he gave to Hamilton College.

Noyes became one of the most powerful advocates at the New York bar. In 1857, he was appointed by the legislature a commissioner with Alexander W. Bradford and David Dudley Field to codify the laws of the state, and he was engaged in this work up to the time of his death. In the autumn of that year he was nominated as a Republican for attorney general of the state but was defeated by Lyman Tremain.

In 1861 the legislature appointed him a commissioner to the conference, where he steadily labored to preserve the integrity of the republic, and at the same time maintain the honor of the loyal states. When, in the winter of the same year, the legislature had to elect a United States senator, he was one of the chief candidates for the nomination.

Mr. Noyes was retained in some of the most celebrated cases of his day. His masterly analysis of moral insanity on the trial of Huntington, his argument in the court of appeals in the New Haven railroad case, his elaborate speech in the suit of the Delaware and Hudson Canal company vs. The Pennsylvania Coal Co. and his numerous arguments in some of the most important will cases were marked by learning, eloquence and close logic.

He was a firm advocate of temperance and devoted much time to addresses on this subject. His talents were always enlisted on the side of the people among whom he lived, and more than once fraudulent judgments against the city were vacated through his clear demonstration of their fallacy. As an equity lawyer he was without parallel, and in cross-examination he had no equal. Few witnesses that went on the stand before him with the determination to commit perjury ever left it without being exposed.

== Honorary degree ==
In 1856 he delivered an address before the graduating class of the law department of Hamilton College, and, although he had never received a college education, that institution conferred on him the degree of LL.D.

== Later years and death ==
True to his motto that it was "better that a man's brain should wear out than rust out," he continued to the last in the practice of his profession. His death was the result of apoplexy.
