= Henry G. Ludlow =

American minister and abolitionist (1797–1867)

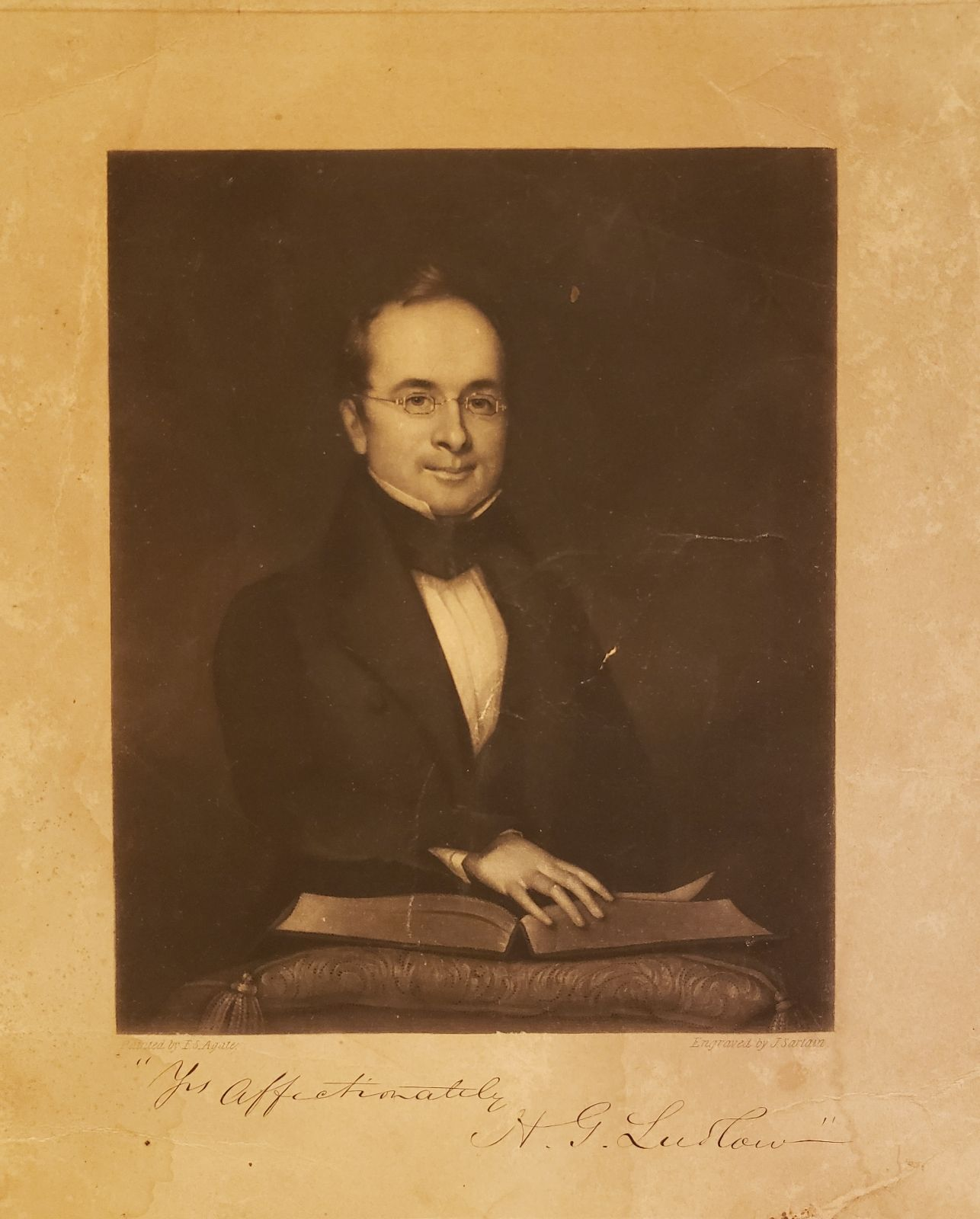
Henry Gilbert Ludlow, engraving by John Sartain after a portrait by Frederick Styles Agate

Henry G. Ludlow (1797–1867) was an American minister and abolitionist, and one of those who worked with the New York Amistad Committee.

He was a divinity student at Yale and then minister of the First Congregational Church in Oswego. From 1828 to 1837, he was the minister of the Spring Street Presbyterian Church in New York City. The church, and Ludlow's home, were partially demolished in July 1834 in one of several nights of anti-abolitionist rioting prompted in part by rumors that Ludlow had presided over a mixed-race marriage.

His son, the author Fitz Hugh Ludlow, later wrote:

my father, mother, and sister were driven from their house in New York by a furious mob. When they came cautiously back, their home was quiet as a fortress the day after it has been blown up. The front-parlor was full of paving-stones; the carpets were cut to pieces; the pictures, the furniture, and the chandelier lay in one common wreck; and the walls were covered with inscriptions of mingled insult and glory. Over the mantel-piece had been charcoaled 'Rascal'; over the pier-table, 'Abolitionist.'

Henry Ludlow wrote that on another occasion he was "mobbed and egged… in broad day light… in the presence of approving & assenting justices of the peace and other officers of the town…" Fitz Hugh also reports that his father was a "ticket-agency on the Underground Railroad".

Henry Ludlow's father was a pioneer temperance advocate, according to one source "adopting and advocating its principles before any general and organized effort for them." Henry himself, in one of his few preserved sermons, attacked Great Britain for "her cruel oppression of her East India subjects, often starving... and forced to cultivate opium on land they need to supply themselves with bread…" and defended China "for resisting a traffick which was sapping, by its terrible effects upon her citizens, the very foundation of her empire…"

== See also ==
- Grimké sisters — they stayed at Ludlow's home in the winter of 1836–1837, and Ludlow promoted their lectures
