= Nassau Lake =

- Location within New York
- Location: Rensselaer County, New York
- Coordinates: 42.538°N 73.604°W
- Type: reservoir

Nassau Lake is a reservoir located in Rensselaer County, New York.

Jonathan Hoag, who settled in Nassau in 1792, purchased of Patroon Stephen Van Rensselaer, several hundred acres of land on and adjoining the site of the village of Nassau. The body of water now known as Nassau Lake was then named Hoag's Pond. It was created by Hoag by constructing a dam which covered "the Vlaie" or "Beaver Meadow" with water.

Nassau Lake and its dam are owned and maintained by the Nassau Lake Park Improvement Association. Use of the lake and association properties are reserved for members of the association. The land surrounding the lake includes the hamlets of Morey Park (at the north end), Braeside (on the west side of the lake), and Rosecrans Park (at the south end). The entire land surrounding the lake is part of the Nassau Lake census-designated place.

There is currently a ban on fish consumption in Nassau Lake due to contamination from the Dewey Loeffel Landfill.
