= Dewey Loeffel Landfill =

EPA superfund site in New York

Coordinates: 42.559834°N 73.561167°W

Location of Dewey Loeffel Landfill in New York State
Boundary of Dewey Loeffel Landfill

The Dewey Loeffel Landfill is an EPA superfund site located in Rensselaer County, New York. In the 1950s and 1960s, several companies including General Electric, Bendix Corporation and Schenectady Chemicals used the site as a disposal facility for more than 46,000 tons of industrial hazardous wastes, including solvents, waste oils, polychlorinated biphenyls (PCBs), scrap materials, sludges and solids. Some hazardous substances, including volatile organic compounds (VOCs) and PCBs, have migrated from the facility to underlying aquifers and downstream surface water bodies, resulting in contamination of groundwater, surface water, sediments and several species of fish. There is currently a ban on fish consumption in Nassau Lake and the impacted tributaries. Following prior assessments and attempts at mitigating drainage from the site, the Environmental Protection Agency (EPA) has placed the site on its National Priority List. As of 2024, the EPA reports ongoing site investigations.

== Background ==
The Dewey Loeffel Landfill is an EPA superfund site located in Rensselaer County, New York. The Loeffel Waste Oil Removal and Service Company operated at the site during the 1950’s and 1960’s, where several companies including General Electric, Bendix Corporation and Schenectady Chemicals (now SI Group) utilized the site as a dump for hazardous waste. The site is a 19-acre waste disposal area in a lagoon and drum burial area, this area includes the landfill, its groundwater, soil, sediment, and surface water bodies. The New York State Department of Environmental Conservation (NYSDEC) estimates that over 46,000 tons of oil waste material were disposed of at the site.

=== Local cleanup efforts ===
In 1968, the State of New York ordered the operator of the site to cease all discharges from the facility and perform cleanup work, as the state had received several complaints from the community noting documented fish and cattle kills and uncontrolled fires near the site. NYSDEC initiated several investigations and clean-up initiatives under its Superfund program. Following this assessment, NYSDEC and parties deemed as potentially responsible for the presence of polychlorinated biphenyls (PCBs) initiated several programs set to monitor and limit the migration of contaminants from the landfill, and maintaining residential well systems.

In 1986, Schenectady Chemicals agreed that it would pay $496,500 toward the cleanup effort.

=== Declaration of Superfund ===
The EPA states that Superfund Remedial Investigations operate under the pretense of site characterization; assessing the nature of the waste and its risk to human and environmental health. Superfund risk assessments focus on ecological receptors to determine the nature of any adverse effects of contaminants, and then works to determine the desired condition of ecological status.

== EPA cleanup operations ==
Following several decades of cleanup initiatives and investigations, NYSDEC recommended the site to the EPA for potential superfund status. In 2009, EPA collected sediment samples indicating a continued presence of PCBs despite prior containment efforts. The EPA added the Dewey Loeffel Landfill to its National Priorities List (NPL) in March 2011, and in 2012 the EPA reached an agreement with General Electric and SI Group, requiring the construction and operation of a water treatment plant at the site and install additional groundwater extraction wells along the edge of the landfill. Under this directive, a system to monitor 1,4-dioxane was introduced to further address water contamination and its success in purification. The site's treatment system is in compliance with the state of New York's discharge limitations. Further agreements have been made between the EPA and General Electric and SI Group, requiring the responsible parties to perform risk analysis under the Superfund directive of both the groundwater and drainageways of the site. The research of this superfund directive is still underway.

=== Pilot programs ===
Following its 2009 preliminary investigation, the EPA began a Superfund Remedial Investigation/Feasibility Study of the site in 2010, collecting data on site conditions, the types of hazards present, and potentially viable treatment technologies. In December, 2023, the EPA reported a selection of five technologies to test, including In-situ Chemical Oxidation (ISCO), Enhanced In-situ Bioremediation (EISB), Bioventing, Soil Vapor Extraction (SVE), and Light Non-Aqueous Phase Liquid (LNAPL) Extractability. Most of these cleared laboratory testing in 2021, with ISCO and EISB beginning their first field tests in mid-2023. Other field tests are slated to begin throughout 2024, with a Treatability Testing Evaluation Report expected sometime in 2025.

=== Community involvement ===
Local residents have lodged complaints against the landfill for environmental disruptions since its operation began in the 1950s. Upon requests from residents, the EPA established the Dewey Loeffel Community Advisory Group (CAG) in 2019. The Advisory Group meets multiples times a year and serves as a connecting point between concerned local residents, local officials, state agencies, and the EPA. In these meetings, residents are provided updates on the state of cleanup operations for Dewey Landfill and any related impact sites. The CAG is focused on working with the EPA in ensuring a timely cleanup of impacted sites and that all contaminant sources are removed from the area to allow for full site reclamation.

An investigation at a nearby property beginning in 2019 was initiated in part due to local residents raising concerns and a tip being lodged with the EPA about possible hazards located on the property.

== Impact ==
The site has been leaking contaminants into local ground and surface water sources since it first began operations in the 1950s. Complaints lodged against the site during its operation include fish and cattle kills downstream and uncontrolled fires, leading to its closure in 1968. Since 1980, the State of New York has maintained a general population fish consumption ban for Nassau Lake and Valatie Kill, as well as a sensitive population warning for Kinderhook Lake, citing elevated levels of PCBs dangerous to humans. It is currently estimated that PCB groundwater contamination persists for a half-mile south of the superfund site, with five known residential well contaminations.

In 2019, EPA investigators discovered a 10,000-gallon chemical tank buried at a nearby property previously used by the landfill to hose out its trucks. Other discoveries at the site included leaking 55-gallon barrels, and unsafe levels of PCBs in the local surface water and groundwater. In 2021, the State of New York declared the property a state superfund site over concerns of groundwater contamination that could affect nearby residents and the Town of Nassau. The EPA has continued its water treatment of the groundwater immediately underneath and surrounding Dewey Landfill, with elevated VOC levels detected at 320 feet below ground level as recently as 2023.

The EPA estimates that a full risk assessment of the site and impacted areas will be available in 2026. In 2024, the EPA published a Performance Measure Update, reporting "insufficient data" to determine the full extent of contaminant exposure pathways to the immediate area.

== See also ==
- Environmental Protection Agency (EPA)
- EPA Superfund Site
- National Priority List
- New York State Department of Environmental Conservation
