= Appleton's =

Appleton's or Appletons' may refer to several publications published by D. Appleton & Company, New York, including:

- Appletons' Journal (1869–1881)
- Appletons' Cyclopædia of American Biography (1887–1889)
- Appleton's Magazine (1905–1909)
- Appletons' travel guides

== See also ==
- Appleton (surname)
